= Islamism in Kurdistan =

History of the Salafi Movement in Kurdistan

Islamism in Kurdistan dates back to as early as the 1920s. Islamism is a political movement which aims to implement Islam into political systems. The history of Islamism in Kurdistan is not contiguous and has a different history depending on which part of Kurdistan.

== Background ==
Islamism in Kurdistan has an early history. During dissolution of the Ottoman Empire, the overwhelming majority of Kurds had fought hard to save it. The Ottoman authorities viewed Kurds as a Muslim minority loyal to the empire and treated them equal to other Muslims. However, the Ottoman Empire was dissolved and was replaced by the Republic of Turkey. The new Turkish state, founded upon secularism and Turkish ethnic nationalism, instantly targeted its Kurdish population, going as far as denying its entire existence and killing those who resisted the Turkification. The Kurds were also persecuted in the newly made Syria and Iraq, both also ruled by secular nationalist regimes. The Islamist Kurds fought to separate from the newly made countries, and establish their own country which would return Islamic rule to the Middle East. Islam historically was the mainstay of the Kurdish independence movement, and it remained so until the Kurdish independence movement was later dominated by secular nationalists. This was evident during the Sheikh Said rebellion and Mahmud Barzanji revolts, and also the revolts led by Osman Abdulaziz, Mashouq al-Khaznawi, Sheikh Ubeydullah, and Simko Shikak.

== Iraqi Kurdistan ==
Political Islam in Iraqi Kurdistan was largely introduced by Osman Abdulaziz. He was loyal to the Muslim Brotherhood and was based in Halabja. Prior to Osman Abdulaziz, the religious Kurds were not as involved in politics. Muslim Brotherhood ideas were also first brought into Iraqi Kurdistan in the early 1940s by Kurds who studied in Baghdad. Despite some Kurds holding high positions in the Muslim Brotherhood, the Muslim Brotherhood remained unpopular with Kurds. Mustafa Barzani and Jalal Talabani both knew Osman Abdulaziz and highly respected him. During the First Iraqi–Kurdish War, Barzani allowed Osman Abdulaziz and his followers to freely operate in KDP territory, and in 1974, Osman Abdulaziz went on a diplomatic mission to Saudi Arabia on behalf of Barzani. During the 1970s and 1980s, the main Islamist groups in Iraqi Kurdistan were two independent Muslim Brotherhood factions, one for Sorani Kurds (Halabja, Sulaymaniyah, parts of Kirkuk and Erbil), and one for Kurmanji Kurds (Duhok, parts of Nineveh and Erbil).

During the Iraq-Iran war, many Kurdish Islamists from Iraq sought asylum in Iranian Kurdistan, where they were hosted by Iranian Kurdish Islamists. Iran attempted to convince the Iraqi Muslim Brotherhood to fight for Iran, as there had been moments in which the Muslim Brotherhood supported the Iranian Revolution and called for unity between Sunni and Shias, however their relations worsened when Iran accused the Muslim Brotherhood of supporting Saddam Hussein during the war.

Another instance was when Iran ignored the 1982 massacre by the Assad regime, in which Said Hawwa criticised Iran. During the Iran-Iraq war, the Muslim Brotherhood had an increase of Arab nationalism, causing its Kurdish members to split from the Arab members. After splitting, Osman Abdulaziz founded the Kurdistan Islamic Movement, which was the originator of many Kurdish Islamist movements. The IMK fought in the Iran-Iraq war, when Osman Abdulaziz famously declared a Jihad and had thousands of Islamist Kurds in his group, although the IMK only became a significant group when Osman Abdulaziz declared a second jihad during the 1991 Iraqi uprisings. Many Islamist Kurds who were living in exile in Iran, or fighting against the Soviets in Afghanistan, returned to Kurdistan and joined Osman Abdulaziz. Among them were Mullah Krekar returning from Afghanistan, and Ali Bapir returning from Iran. Many Kurdish Islamists had been in Afghanistan where they either fought the Soviets or received training from the Taliban or Al-Qaeda to utilise in Kurdistan. The IMK sent Kurds to Osama bin Laden, in which they told him about the atrocities that Saddam Hussein was committing in Iraqi Kurdistan. After al-Qaeda relocated to Khartoum, Sudan, in 1991, an al-Qaeda instructor visited Iraqi Kurdistan to train the IMK rebels in 1992. Kurdish Islamists would regularly send delegations to Osama bin Laden in Afghanistan, and Osama bin Laden had noticed the factionalism among Kurdish Islamists and advised them to solve their differences and reunite.

Unlike other Islamist Kurds, Salahaddin Bahaaddin, who remained in the Muslim Brotherhood, refused to rebel against Baathist Iraq and called for an Islamic nonviolent campaign instead. Salaheddin Bahaeddin was isolated from other Islamist Kurds, and in 1994 he formed the Kurdistan Islamic Union. Osman Abdulaziz was gaining popularity, and the IMK was rapidly gaining power. Eventually, a conflict erupted between the IMK and the Kurdistan Regional Government led by the PUK and KDP. Later, the conflict ended as part of the truce, the IMK was allowed to participate in the KRG and became its third significant party.

A significant amount of IMK members who viewed democracy as haram left the IMK and split into many different factions. Mullah Krekar later emerged as a leading figure for Kurdish Islamists. Unlike the mainstream Salafi Islamism which mostly advocated for a global caliphate, Mullah Krekar presented a form of Salafi Islamism where it was focused on Kurdish affairs. He was an avid supporter of Kurdish independence and he did not plan on expanding his control past Kurdistan. He held other nationalist views, however he abandoned the components of nationalism which conflicted with religion.

Mullah Krekar was joined by many other Salafi Kurds, including his own Islah group, the KJG, and Jund al-Islam (a merger of the Tawhid Islamic Front, the Islamic Resistance Movement, and the Second Soran Unit). They later captured land in 2001 in Hawraman and formed the Islamic Emirate of Kurdistan. In the Islamic Emirate, Islah and Jund al-Islam merged to form Ansar al-Islam. Ansar al-Islam grew very quickly and had big influence. Ansar al-Islam attacks were so effective that they led to the formation of CTG Kurdistan by the KRG. Ansar al-Islam maintained its control over the Islamic Emirate of Kurdistan until a US bombing campaign during Operation Viking Hammer ended the Islamic Emirate, and Ansar al-Islam dissolved. In 2005, Ali Bapir, known for his hatred of the KRG and democracy, took part in elections for the KRG parliament, and the KJG became the third Islamist party after IMK and KIU. The Kurdistan Brigades and Ansar al-Islam both sought to remove all non-Muslims and their influence from Kurdistan. Ansar al-Islam specifically targeted Franso Hariri, an Assyrian Christian, and killed him after 2 failed attempts on his life earlier.

After the fall of the Islamic Emirate, Abu Abdullah al-Shafi'i founded Jamaat Ansar al-Sunna, while Mullah Krekar left for Norway where he founded and led Rawti Shax until his arrest in 2015. Later, Jama'at Ansar al-Islam was founded, although it had no relation to Mullah Krekar. When the Islamic State in Kurdistan first emerged in 2014, Jama'at Ansar al-Islam and the Kurdistan Brigades both fought against the Islamic State. After months of fighting, the Islamic State won. Both the Kurdistan Brigades and Jama'at Ansar al-Islam drastically declined, and Jama'at Ansar al-Islam relocated to Jabal al-Akrad. In a 2010 interview, Mullah Krekar complained about Arab jihadists, claiming that when they asked for help, the Kurdish jihadists generously offered help in the Sunni Triangle, while when the Kurdish jihadists asked for help, the Arab jihadists only made excuses to avoid helping.

== Iranian Kurdistan ==
During his campaign in Iran, Simko Shikak was partially motivated by Islamism as well. Kurdish Islamists in Iran were historically strongly oriented towards the Kurdish Islamists in Iraq, as the Iranian Shia authorities had been very strict on Sunni Islamist activities. While most Kurdish Islamists adhered to a Salafi leaning form, Naser Sobhani attempted to spread a Naqshbandi form in Iranian Kurdistan. Ahmad Moftizade had established the Maktab-i Qur’an group in Iranian Kurdistan. Moftizade took from the ideas of Maududi and the Muslim Brotherhood. He also worked with Iranian reformist Muslim thinkers, including Mehdi Bazargan and Ali Shariati. As a known opponent of the Shah, Moftizade attempted to negotiate with the new Islamic Republic of Iran, and proposed a Kurdish autonomous region that would be ruled according to Islamic governance. He later was in conflict with the Iranian government again. The international Muslim Brotherhood attempted to intervene on behalf of Moftizade, however the Iranian government arrested him in 1982, and he died soon after his 1993 release. The Iranian government later arrested Sobhani who died in prison. Both of their movements declined and split into more factions with different ideologies. The Salafi Islamism of Mullah Krekar that spread in Iraqi Kurdistan later spread to Iranian Kurdistan and grew over there. Iranian Kurdish Islamists also smuggled goods across the Iran–Iraq border to the Islamic Emirate of Byara.

== Turkish Kurdistan ==
Secularism first arose in Anatolia during the later Ottoman Empire, and it was enforced during the Republic of Turkey, however, Kurds initially refused to secularise, and secularism only rose among Kurds much later than it did among Turks. The Kurdish region of Turkey was noted for being more religious and prone to radicalisation than the Turkish region. When nationalism also rose among Turks, Kurds also initially rejected it, however it would later rise among Kurds as well. Sheikh Said rebelled against Turkey in 1925, with the goal of reinstating Islamic law and resisting the Turkish government oppression and denial of Kurds. Necmettin Erbakan later became one of the pioneers of Islamism in Turkey. His Millî Görüş ideology was similar to the Muslim Brotherhood, but much more Turkish-centered. Erbakan's MSP was among the first to challenge the government's denial of Kurds, and had recruited many Kurds. When the MSP was part of the coalition government in 1974-1975, four of its seven politicians it assigned to the cabinet were Kurds. Nevertheless, the Kurds in the MSP most often hid their ethnicity and rarely spoke about it. Regardless of the Turkish government attempts at eliminating Islamism, during the 1960s and 1970s it tolerated and even promoted the Turkish–Islamic synthesis, which became the state ideology after the 1980 coup d'état. The ideology was Anti-Kurdish and would later contribute to the split between Kurdish and Turkish Islamists. While the fusion of Turkish nationalism and Islamism was popular at the time, there was no fusion of Islamism and nationalism among Kurds. This changed when the Kurdistan Islamic Party (PIK) was founded in 1979. It was the first Islamist group to directly speak about Kurdish identity. The PIK was mostly active in the diaspora but had a presence in Turkish Kurdistan. It recruited Kurds from other countries and campaigned in both Kurmanji and Sorani. PIK was considered the ideological originator of the Kurdish Hezbollah. The PIK never became a significant movement. The PIK was also active in Iraqi Kurdistan, and supported Osman Abdulaziz. The PIK avoided conflict with secular Kurdish parties and even collaborated with them. However, the PIK refused to take up arms, claiming that they wanted to achieve their goals through dawah rather than violence. The Kurdish Hezbollah was founded in 1993, and immediately fought against both the PKK and Turkish authorities. The Kurdish Hezbollah remained a violent organisation until intensive Turkish government operations defeated and ended the armed activities of Hezbollah. The Kurdish Hezbollah later rebranded into many civil organisations, including the Free Cause Party, and continued to operate through them.

== Syrian Kurdistan ==
In Syrian Kurdistan, the politicisation of Islam had socially been a taboo, even among the religious Syrian Kurds. Regardless, there have been Syrian Kurds participating in Islamist activities. Mashouq al-Khaznawi was the main advocate for Kurds in Syria until his killing. Later, the ruling PYD in the AANES began to enforce secularism. The Movement of Salah al-Din the Kurd and the Kurdish Islamic Front were founded in Syrian Kurdistan during the Syrian civil war. Despite both groups wanting to fight for Kurdish interests, the PYD refused to allow the groups to operate and they both were ineffective due to PYD pressure. The PYD continued its policies, and their alleged interfered with the practice of Islam in Syrian Kurdistan contributed to a rise of Islamism among Syrian Kurds. During the Siege of Kobanî, some Kurdish residents had helped the Islamic State with further advancements into the city.

== See also ==
- Kurdish Muslims
- Kurdish-Islamic synthesis
