= Iraqi Kurdistan conflict (2001–2003) =

Armed conflict in the Middle East

- Part of the Islamist insurgency in the Kurdistan Region and War on terror
- Iraqi Kurdistan in 2003
Date	September 2001 – March 2003 (1 year and 6 months)
Location	Kurdistan Region
Result	Kurdistan Region–United States victory: Kurdistan Regional Government regains control of the Islamic Emirate of Kurdistan

Belligerents
Islamic Emirate of Kurdistan; Ansar al-Islam; Kurdistan Islamic Group; Kurdistan Islamic Movement; Supported by: Iran (alleged by PUK); KDP (alleged by PUK)	Kurdistan Region; PUK; United States (armed involvement after Viking Hammer) Supported by: Ba'athist Iraq (claimed)

Commanders and leaders
Mullah Krekar; Mullah Ali Bapir; Abu Abdullah al-Shafi'i	Jalal Talabani (United States) Tommy Franks

Strength
700–1,000 fighters	70,000 PUK; ~40 U.S. Special Forces

Casualties and losses
200+ killed	Unknown, at least 45 killed and 93 wounded

From 2001 to 2003, a military conflict took place in Iraqi Kurdistan between the Kurdistan Region and the Islamic Emirate of Kurdistan. The conflict began in 2001 over the governance of Iraqi Kurdistan. In the first battle of the 2003 invasion of Iraq, Operation Viking Hammer was launched, and the Islamic Emirate of Kurdistan dissolved. After the offensive, most officials of the Islamic Emirate of Kurdistan were exiled to Iran. Ansar al-Islam moved southward to participate in the Iraqi insurgency and, after it was quelled, the Syrian civil war.

== Background ==
Ansar al-Islam was formed in September 2001 when Jund al-Islam merged with a splinter group from the Islamic Movement of Kurdistan, under the leadership of Mullah Krekar. According to the Patriotic Union of Kurdistan (PUK), the group consisted of Kurdish veterans of jihad who had gone to Afghanistan to fight alongside the Taliban against the Soviet invasion in the 1980s. They returned to Kurdistan after the defeat of the Taliban government in Afghanistan in 2001. Ansar al-Islam imposed Sharia in the villages they controlled around Byara, close to the border with Iran.

== Ansar al-Islam's rule ==
Human Rights Watch has accused Ansar al-Islam of committing atrocities against the civilian population in the territory they controlled. It has been alleged that Ansar al-Islam harshly persecuted the Yarsan religious minority and enforced strict Islamic law. Human Rights Watch also accused Ansar al-Islam fighters of torturing prisoners and summarily executing captured PUK soldiers. After the Battle of Kheli Hama, Ansar al-Islam was again accused of beheading and mutilating captured PUK prisoners.

== Assassination attempts ==
After two unsuccessful assassination attempts on Franso Hariri by Ansar al-Islam in Erbil in 1994 and 1997, a third attempt in 2001 succeeded. It happened on the exact same street as the previous two attempts.

An unsuccessful attempt was made on the life of Barham Salih in April 2002 by Ansar al-Islam. At the time, Saleh was the PUK's Regional Government Prime Minister. Later, in February 2003, Ansar al-Islam assassinated the prominent PUK commander Shawkat Haji Mushir, along with five other people.

In March 2004, the US State Department officially classified Ansar al-Islam as a terrorist organization.

== 2003 invasion of Iraq ==
In September 2002, Tariq Aziz claimed that the Iraqi government "gave Talibani weapons and ammunition, we helped as much as we could. We are not allowed of course to go into what is called the semi-autonomous region of Kurdistan physically, but the help we gave helped Talibani in his fight for it." During the 2003 invasion of Iraq, U.S. forces aided the PUK in attacking Ansar al-Islam. In late March 2003, PUK forces, supported by American special forces, captured Halabja after several days of heavy fighting. The surviving Ansar al-Islam forces fled to Iran.

American intelligence personnel inspected the suspected chemical weapons site in Sargat and discovered traces of ricin in the ruins, as well as potassium chloride. They also discovered chemical weapons suits, atropine nerve gas antidotes, and manuals on manufacturing chemical weapons, lending credence to the idea that the site was related to the manufacture of chemical weapons and poisons. Talabani declared victory on March 30.

== Aftermath ==
After their defeat in Iraqi Kurdistan, Ansar al-Islam joined the Iraqi insurgency. Several terrorist attacks in the Erbil area have been linked to Ansar al-Islam, including the assassination of Franso Hariri and the suicide bombing of the PUK and KDP headquarters in Erbil that killed 117 people. They also carried out the bombing of the Mount Lebanon Hotel in Baghdad on March 17, 2004.
