= Islamist insurgency in the Kurdistan Region =

Military conflict in Iraqi Kurdistan (1993-present)

Islamist Insurgency in the Kurdistan Region
- Part of War on terror
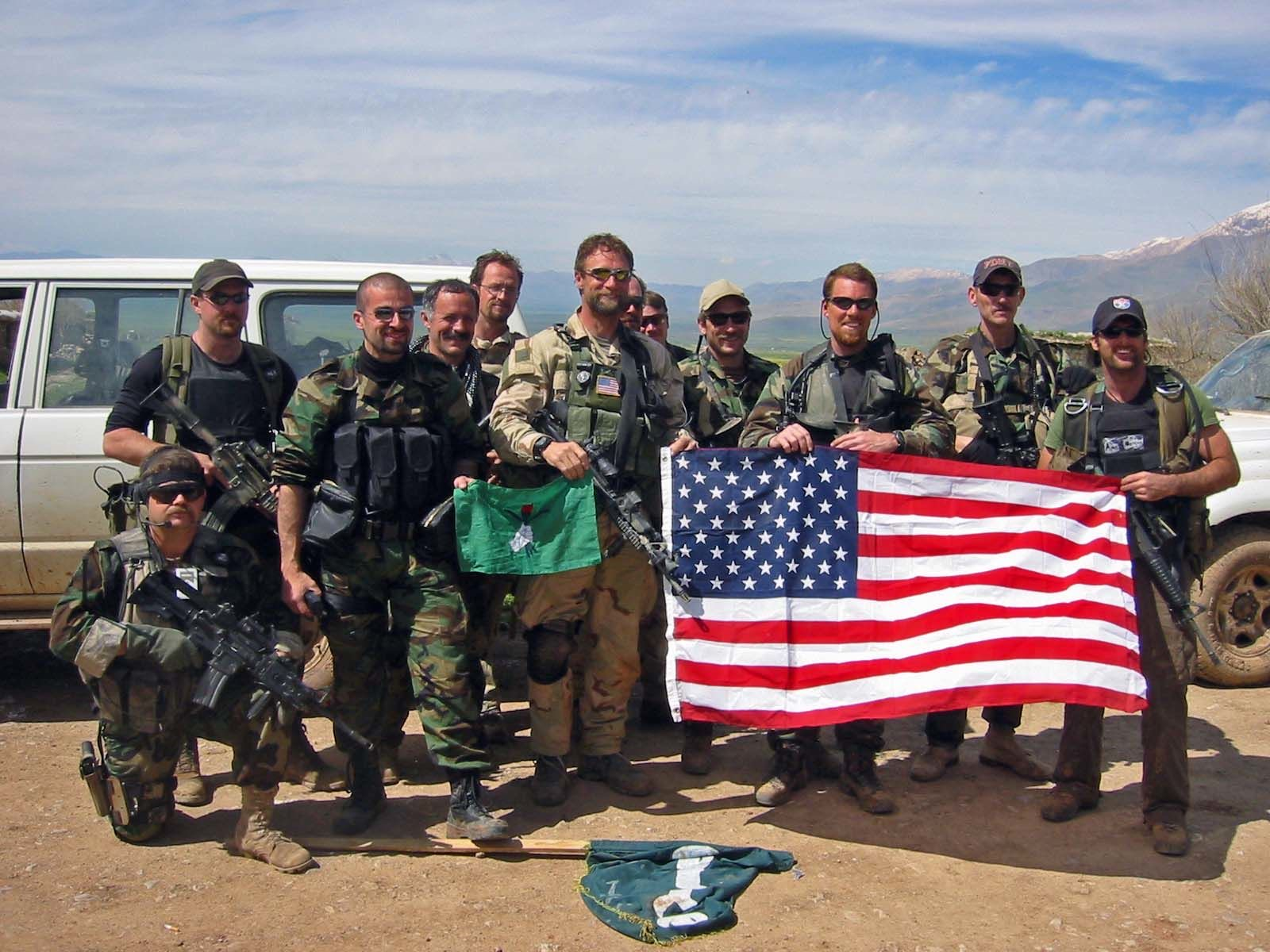
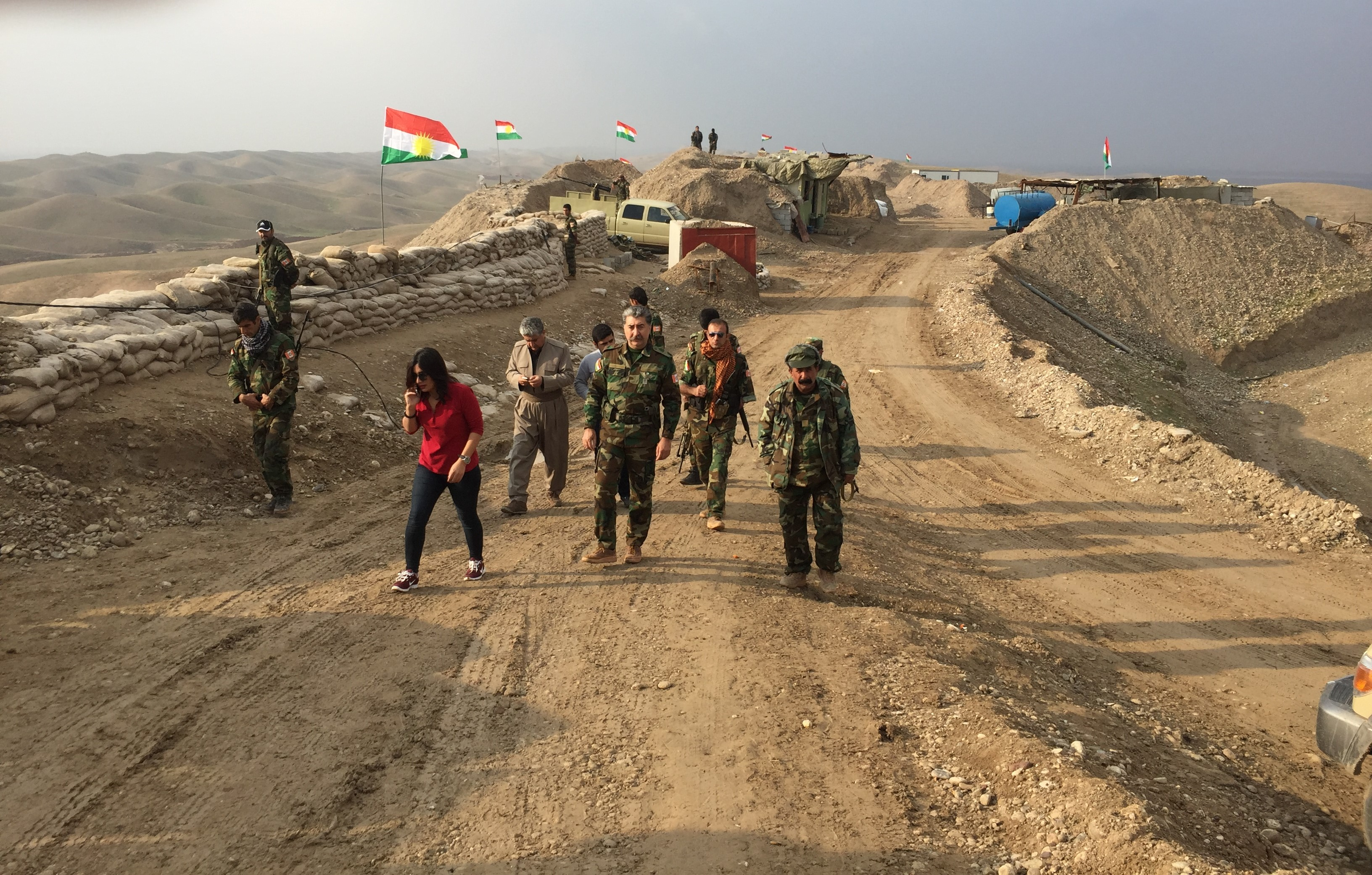
- Left to right: Peshmerga forces and CIA personnel after defeating Ansar al-Islam in Operation Viking Hammer; PAK outpost on the frontline with ISIS, Iraq, December 2015.
Date	1993-present
Location	Iraqi Kurdistan, Northern Iraq
Result	Ongoing: Defeat and dissolution of the Islamic Emirate of Kurdistan in 2003; Kurdish and allied forces defeat ISIS in 2017; Low scale insurgency (2017-present)

Belligerents
(Kurdistan Region) Kurdistan Regional Government; Kurdistan Democratic Party; Êzîdxan Protection Force (2014-present); Kurdistan Freedom Party; Patriotic Union of Kurdistan Kurdistan Workers' Party (2014-2017); Supported by: Iraq (against the Islamic State); CJTF–OIR	(Taliban) Islamic Emirate of Kurdistan (1993-2003); Ansar al-Islam (1997-2003); Kurdistan Islamic Group (until 2003); (Taliban) Kurdistan Islamic Movement (1993-1997) Al-Qaeda Islamic State (Ba'athist Iraq) Naqshbandi Army; GMCIR

Commanders and leaders
Main leaders: (Kurdistan Democratic Party) Nechirvan Barzani (Kurdistan Democratic Party) Masoud Barzani (Patriotic Union of Kurdistan) Jalal Talabani (Patriotic Union of Kurdistan) Nawshirwan Mustafa (Patriotic Union of Kurdistan) Kosrat Rasul Ali	Main leaders Mullah Krekar; Sheikh Zana (executed) (Islamic State) Abu Bakr al-Baghdadi (2014-2019) (Note: Until his assassination in 2019 by the United States airstrikes.)

Units involved
CTU; CTG; US Army Special Forces; CIA SAD	Second Soran Unit Islamic State – Kurdistan Province

Islamist insurgency in the Kurdistan Region refers to a series of armed conflicts and attacks involving Islamist militant's in the Kurdistan Region of Iraq including surrounding areas. The insurgency began with the clashes between the Islamic Movement in Kurdistan and the Patriotic Union of Kurdistan in 1993-1994 and the establishment of the Islamic Emirate of Kurdistan in 1994 which later evolved into the conflict between the Kurdish government and Ansar al-Islam from 2001 to 2003, which ended with the defeat and dissolution of the Islamic Emirate of Kurdistan. Following the 2003 invasion of Iraq, Islamist militants continued to carry out attacks in the region mostly against civilians and some government officials. From 2014 onwards, Kurdish forces fought the Islamic State in and around Iraqi Kurdistan, where it was defeated in 2017, followed by a low-scale ongoing insurgency after its territorial defeat.

== Background ==
The Kurdistan Region of Iraq is an autonomous region in northern Iraq. Kurdish self-rule developed after the 1991 uprising against the Iraqi government and the establishment of a no-fly zone over northern Iraq. Following parliamentary elections in 1992, Kurdish parties established a regional parliament and government. The region’s status as a federal entity within Iraq was formally recognized by the 2005 Iraqi Constitution.

Islamist political forces were mainly represented by the Islamic Movement in Kurdistan (IMK), founded in 1987. By the mid-1990s, the IMK had become the third-largest political and military force in the Kurdish region after the KDP and PUK. The movement operated largely outside the joint Kurdish administration and established its own political and military infrastructure in areas it controlled, particularly in Hawraman and Sharazur. A number of Iraqi Kurds affiliated with Ansar al-Islam, including key leaders, were veterans of the Soviet-Afghan war. They had spent time in Afghanistan, initially fighting against Soviet forces during the 1980s. Representatives of other Iraqi Kurdish Islamist groups with links to Ansar al-Islam told Human Rights Watch that a small number of Iraqi Kurds affiliated with the group had also fought alongside the Taliban before returning to Iraqi Kurdistan after its defeat.

== Insurgency ==
=== 1993–1994 clashes ===
From late October 1993 to early 1994, fighting took place across much of northern Iraq between the Islamic Movement in Kurdistan (IMK), led by Mullah Othman Abdul Aziz, and the Patriotic Union of Kurdistan (PUK). The fighting was extensive, with PUK forces reportedly capturing IMK military bases in Rawanduz, Shaqlawa, Harir, Diyana, Char-Quran, Hajiwa, and the IMK’s main military base, the Salahadin Garrison near Ranya, in late December 1993. The IMK headquarters at Betwata, near the Iranian border, was also captured. Fighting reportedly spread as far south as Halabja. The IMK was forced to withdraw toward the Iranian border. When the Kurdish civil war broke out between the KDP and PUK in May 1994, IMK forces fought alongside the KDP against the PUK. The IMK later returned to its strongholds in Hawraman and Sharazur, where it maintained its own political and military infrastructure. The war ended with a US-brokered peace agreement in 1998.

=== Ansar al-Islam ===
Following the fighting, Hamas emerged, an armed Islamist group around Khurmal and split from the IMK in 1997 after the latter agreed to participate in the PUK government. Hamas opposed cooperation with secular parties and was led by Umar Abdul Karim Abdul Aziz (Umar Barzani), who had fought in Afghanistan. Tawhid, led by Mullah Abdul Ghani Bazazi, emerged from mosques in Erbil but was banned by the KDP. In 2000, a faction known as the Tawhid Islamic Group carried out attacks including acid attacks against unveiled women, the KDP cracked down on this, forcing members to relocate to areas including Halabja and Hajji Umran. Hamas and Tawhid subsequently developed closer ties and united in July 2001 to form the Tawhid Islamic Front. On 19 February 2001, gunmen in Erbil assassinated Franso Hariri, the KDP majority leader in the Kurdistan Regional Government’s parliament and its highest-ranking Christian official. KDP officials traced the getaway car to PUK-controlled territory, while PUK forces traced it to Halabja and arrested a suspect who named five others. The attack was attributed to Tawhid and was reportedly carried out in retaliation for a 2000 incident near Hajji Umran in which KDP peshmerga opened fire on Tawhid militants infiltrating from Iran, killing 20. The IMK refused to hand the suspects over to the KDP in March 2001, prompting the KDP and PUK to close IMK offices, which reopened in April. Members of the Islamic Union claimed that the KDP arrested more than 2,000 Islamists. On 23 March, the Kurdistan Regional Government identified the assassins of Franso Hariri but no names were given. On 1 September 2001, the Tawhid Islamic Front and the Second Soran unit merged to form Jund al-Islam. The group declared jihad against secular and other Kurdish political parties and established strongholds around Biyara and Tawela near the Iranian border. Fighting soon broke out with the PUK. On 23 September, Jund al-Islam killed 37 PUK fighters at Kheli Hama on the Sulaymaniyah–Halabja road, 25 of them were reportedly killed after surrendering. By September 26, the PUK had reasserted its control over Halabja. Fighting continued into October in areas including Sharazur and Hawraman. In December 2001, following the clashes, Jund al-Islam was dissolved and renamed Ansar al-Islam, with Mullah Krekar becoming its leader. Its armed fighters remained in control of the villages of Biyara and Tawela and their vicinity near the Iranian border. Armed clashes between Ansar al-Islam and the Patriotic Union of Kurdistan (PUK) continued into November 2001, but in mid-December Ansar al-Islam announced a ceasefire. Peace talks between the two sides took place from December 2001 to March 2002, but were suspended in April following the attempted assassination of PUK Prime Minister Barham Salih. No major armed clashes followed, although relations between the two sides remained tense. On 4 May 2002, Ansar al-Islam leader Mullah Fateh Krekar issued an amnesty for PUK fighters. In areas under its control, however, Ansar al-Islam continued to carry out arbitrary arrests and detentions of suspected PUK sympathizers and others accused of violating the group’s strict Islamic code. Human Rights Watch reported that former detainees described beatings, burning of the skin with acid, and prolonged suspension from the limbs. By September 2002, at least forty families had fled Biyara and Tawela for nearby Halabja.

Escalation rose in December 2002 when two PUK outposts were overrun, the bodies of the soldiers mutilated, and videotapes of the heinous act distributed in Sulaymaniyah. In March 2003, the 3rd Battalion, 10th Special Forces Group, together with PUK Peshmerga forces, planned an operation to destroy Ansar al-Islam in northeastern Iraq near the Iranian border. On 21 March, more than 60 Tomahawk cruise missiles struck Ansar al-Islam targets. Operation Viking Hammer began on 28 March, when approximately 7,000 Peshmerga and U.S. Special Forces attacked Ansar al-Islam positions. The operation ended on 30 March. By then, all of Ansar al-Islam’s fighters had either been killed or had fled across the border into Iran. In November 2003, the surviving members of Ansar Al-Islam reunited and changed the name of the group to Ansar Al-Sunna in an attempt to reunite Iraqi-based extremists. Then, in December 2007, Ansar Al-Sunna returned to its name of Ansar Al-Islam, although some jihadists still occasionally use the name Ansar Al-Sunna. Ansar Islam/Ansar al-Sunna then operated primarily as part of the wider Iraqi insurgency, rather than returning to control territory in Iraqi Kurdistan. The U.S. State Department describes Ansar al-Islam/Ansar al-Sunna as carrying out attacks from 2003 onward against Iraqi government/security forces and coalition forces.

=== 2006 Halabja unrest ===
In March 2006, unrest broke out in Halabja during the 18th anniversary of the Halabja massacre. Some 2,000 angry protestors stormed the Halabja Martyrs monument. Kurdish authorities alleged that Islamic militants were responsible for the violence. They attacked and set fire to the Halabja memorial. Security forces opened fire as more demonstrators attempted to storm the site, resulting in the death of a protestor and injuries to several others. Kurda Ahmed, 17, was hit in the abdomen by a police rifle bullet, said eyewitnesses, who also alleged that a member of the security forces shot him again in the side, firing a pistol at close range. Ahmed died in Halabja hospital.

=== Sheikh Zana network ===
Before the Iraq War, Zana Nusrat Sheikh Abdul Karim al-Barzinji, known as Sheikh Zana, established a network in Erbil, according to confessions attributed to him. The network was linked first to Ansar al-Islam and later to Ansar al-Sunna, and the report said it assisted in bombings carried out in Erbil by the two groups from 2003 onward. On 1 February 2004, in Erbil, two suicide bombers carried out separate attacks, blowing themselves at the PUK and KDP headquarters, killing 101-105 officials and civilians, also injuring hundreds. (Note: 101 deaths, PDK claim 105 deaths, PUK claim) The Kurdistan Regional Government accused the network of assassinating prominent Kurdish figures and members of the Kurdistan Democratic Party and said it was preparing further attacks. Islamist figures in the Kurdistan Region disputed describing the network as an Islamist group, saying that some of its members had initially been involved in Islamist activity but later departed from it. In 2005 a court found him and 10 other members guilty of dozens of killings, rapes, and kidnappings over a several-year period. He was executed by hanging in Erbil in September 2006. Zana and his group were the first executed by the Kurdish government since it was established in 1992.

=== 2014 Northern Iraq offensive ===
In June 2014, the Islamic State captured Mosul and expanded its control across northern Iraq. In early August, Islamic State forces captured several areas near the Kurdistan Region, including Sinjar, Makhmur, Gwer, the Mosul Dam and Zummar, bringing the group to within about 50 kilometers of Erbil. Peshmerga forces initially withdrew from several positions but regrouped and began counterattacking. On 10 August, Peshmerga forces retook Makhmur and Gwer.

=== 2014 Kirkuk offensive ===
On 17 June 2014, ISIL forces started an offensive with intent to capture Kirkuk. Soon after, the group attacked the village of Bashir 15 km south of Kirkuk city, where they clashed with local gunmen and police forces, assisted by the Peshmerga. After an hour of fighting the militants captured the village, leaving a senior Kurdish police brigadier wounded and six of his bodyguards killed. After taking control of the village ISIL massacred 52 Shi’a Turkmens. With Bashir captured, ISIL moved forward and temporarily captured two sub-districts of the Kirkuk city: one in the west of it (Multaqa sub-district) and one in the south (Taza sub-district). Later that day, Peshmerga forces, with support of U.S.-led Coalition airstrikes, recaptured both sub-districts. In December, ISIS claimed responsibility for a suicide car bomb attack on Kirkuk that killed at least 17 people and injured more than 20. The attack, according to ISIS, was meant to send a message to the Kurdish people and Peshmerga fighters.

=== Sinjar massacre ===
On 3 August, the Islamic State attacked Sinjar and surrounding areas, forcing tens of thousands of Yazidis to flee toward Mount Sinjar. Those who remained on the mountain were surrounded by Islamic State forces and faced shortages of food, water and medical supplies. U.S. airstrikes and humanitarian airdrops began in August, while YPG forces opened a corridor from Syria to Mount Sinjar that allowed many of those trapped on the mountain to escape.

=== 2014 Sinjar offensive ===
On 17 December 2014, Kurdistan Region Peshmerga forces began an offensive to break the Islamic State’s siege of Mount Sinjar in Nineveh Governorate. Backed by international coalition airstrikes, the Peshmerga opened a corridor that allowed many civilians, mostly from the Yazidi community, who were trapped on the mountain to leave. On 20–21 December, Peshmerga and Syrian Kurdish forces from the People’s Protection Units (YPG) captured Sinjar town. In late December, Peshmerga forces launched a ground offensive to drive the Islamic State out of Gwer in Erbil Governorate, and several villages were liberated.

=== 2015 Kirkuk offensive ===
On the night of 29 January 2015, Islamic State fighters launched a series of attacks on the outskirts of Kirkuk from four directions. The fighters broke through Peshmerga positions at Mala Abdullah and Meryam Bag and captured Maktab Khalid and the nearby Khabaz oil field, taking around a dozen Peshmerga troops captive. Kurdish forces, supported by the US-led coalition, took nearly two days of fighting to drive the Islamic State from the areas it had occupied. Dozens of Kurdish troops were killed, including two senior generals. An Islamic State cell of 4 fighters also attacked an empty hotel in Kirkuk, but security forces repelled the assault. On 9 March 2015, Peshmerga forces, supported by coalition airstrikes, launched an operation west of Kirkuk against Islamic State positions. The Peshmerga seized a key ridgeline and parts of Route 80, pushing Islamic State forces 2 to 3 miles back and liberating about 30 square miles of territory. The operation also pushed the Islamic State farther away from the Kirkuk oilfields.

=== 2015 Sinjar offensive ===
On 12 November 2015, Iraqi Kurdish forces backed by US-led coalition warplanes launched an offensive to retake Sinjar from the Islamic State. About 7,500 Peshmerga fighters advanced toward the town from three fronts, while Yazidi militias also moved toward areas under Islamic State control. Coalition aircraft carried out 24 strikes on Islamic State targets in and around Sinjar. Peshmerga forces secured Gabara and a section of Highway 47 between Sinjar and Syria, cutting an Islamic State supply route between Mosul and Raqqa. The offensive also involved Kurdish Workers’ Party (PKK), People’s Protection Units (YPG), and Yazidi-led Sinjar Resistance forces that had been fighting the Islamic State around the town. On 13 November, President of the Kurdistan region, Masoud Barzani announced that Sinjar had been liberated, and Peshmerga forces said they were in control of the town.

=== October 2016 Kirkuk attacks ===
On 21 October 2016, Islamic State fighters attacked multiple targets in and around Kirkuk, including a power station and government buildings. The fighters also attacked a former police complex in central Kirkuk. According to the governor of Kirkuk, Islamic State members had divided into small groups and infiltrated five areas of the city. Security forces fought the attackers, while a Kurdish Peshmerga base west of Kirkuk also came under attack. At least six policemen and 12 Islamic State fighters were reported killed in the clashes. On 22 October 2016, fighting between security forces and Islamic State fighters continued for a second day in Kirkuk. Fighting was reportedly still taking place in some areas more than 24 hours after the attacks began, with intensive exchanges of gunfire. More Islamic State fighters had appeared in the city the following morning after a Peshmerga commander had said the situation was nearly under control the previous night. Peshmerga and Iraqi forces had been sent to Kirkuk as reinforcements after being pulled from other front lines. Military commanders believed the attack was intended to divert forces from the offensive against Mosul. On the same day, Iraqi police declared that ISIL's attack on Kirkuk had been repelled and that all the attackers had been killed or had blown themselves up.

Kurdish involvement in Mosul (2016-2017)

40,000 Peshmerga (including approximately 200 Iranian Kurdish female fighters from the Kurdistan Freedom Party (PAK), were deployed to the battle. In late May 2016, Peshmerga forces conducted an attack east of Mosul, clearing eight villages and advancing about 15 kilometres to control the Khazir River. The Coalition supported the operation with 22 airstrikes. On 14 August, Peshmerga forces launched another offensive in the area, capturing 11 villages and advancing toward Gwer. On 14 August, Peshmerga forces launched another offensive in the area, capturing 11 villages and advancing toward Gwer. The offensive to recapture Mosul began in October 2016, with Peshmerga forces initially advancing from the east before moving to positions on the city’s northeastern flank. On 23 October, Peshmerga forces seized eight villages on the northeastern flank and advanced to within 9 kilometres of Mosul. Masoud Barzani, president of the Kurdistan Region, told U.S. Defense Secretary Ash Carter that Peshmerga forces had also seized the strategic town of Bashiqa, about 24 kilometres northeast of Mosul.

=== Timeline of the low scale Insurgency (2017-present) ===
- On 23 July 2018, gunmen stormed the governorate building in Erbil and took hostages. The attackers entered through the main gate and a side entrance, armed with pistols, AK-47 rifles and hand grenades. They took control of the third floor and opened fire on security forces. After four hours of clashes, Kurdish security forces killed the gunmen. One government employee was killed and two policemen were wounded. Security officials suspected the attackers were from the Islamic State.
- In August 2018, a Peshmerga commander said coalition airstrikes on five ISIS hideouts around Makhmur had killed 11 ISIS militants.
- In December 2019, Kurdish villagers in Aliya Rash, near Makhmur, fought off an ISIS attack without casualties on either side.
- In February 2020, an ISIS attack on the Makhmur refugee camp killed one guard and wounded others.
- In April 2020, ISIS attacked Peshmerga positions in Kulajo in the Garmian region, killing two Peshmerga fighters. The president of the Kurdistan Region, Nechirvan Barzani, expressed his condolences to the victims families.
- In June 2020, Peshmerga Affairs Ministry chief Jabar Yawar said ISIS had carried out 85 attacks in four months, killing 70 people and wounding 161. Those casualties included Peshmerga, Iraqi Army, PMF and federal police personnel. During the same period they abudcted 41 other people for ransom.
- On 29 November 2021, ISIS attacked a Peshmerga checkpoint near Kifri, killing one Peshmerga and wounding three. According to the Kurdistan regional government, the Peshmerga successfully defended their position and thwarted the attack.
- On 19 October 2022 an ISIS-suspected IED struck a Peshmerga commando force conducting an anti-ISIS operation near Qum Palik. One Peshmerga was killed and eight wounded.
- On 8 April 2023, ISIS attacked a Peshmerga position at Ala village near Mount Qarachogh, about 50 km southwest of Erbil. The Peshmerga repelled the attack without casualties.
- in January 2026, Peshmerga repelled an attempted ISIS attack on a frontline position in Tuz Khurmatu. The Peshmerga commander said the forces had been monitoring ISIS movements in the area before the attempted assault.
