= Battle of Kheli Hama =

Battle between Ansar al-Islam and PUK

- Part of the Islamist insurgency in Iraqi Kurdistan
Date	September 24, 2001
Location	Kheli Hama, Halabja
Result	PUK victory: Ansar Al-Islam initially capture Kheli Hama; Kheli Hama recaptured by PUK 24 hours later

Belligerents
Kurdistan Region; PUK; Supported by: United States	Islamic Emirate of Kurdistan; Ansar al-Islam

Commanders and leaders
Jalal Talabani	Mullah Krekar

Casualties and losses
42 killed	15 killed

The Battle of Kheli Hama was an ambush on the PUK by Ansar al-Islam in the village of Kheli Hama in the Halabja Governorate. It took place 13 days after the September 11 attacks, although there was no connection between them.

== Attack ==
The attack happened at 3:00 in the afternoon. Ansar al-Islam fighters launched a surprise attack from 3 sides against the PUK forces stationed in the village. Because the PUK forces were off guard and not expecting any attacks by Ansar al-Islam, the Ansar fighters dealt one of their deadliest blows. The PUK were pushed out and the village of Kheli Hama briefly fell under Ansar control. After 24 hours of Ansar al-Islam occupying the village as part of their Islamic Emirate of Kurdistan, the PUK returned with more soldiers, backup soldiers, and United States support, and took the village back. A total of 15 Ansar al-Islam fighters and 42 PUK fighters were killed, and an additional 8 PUK held captive by Ansar al-Islam.

== Aftermath ==
In 2018, a monument dedicated to the PUK soldiers who died in the attack was built in Sharazoor, close to Kheli Hama. In February 2021, a local Kurdish man from Sharazoor was arrested by the Asayish for writing Ansar al-Islam graffiti on the wall of the monument. During the interrogation, he pleaded guilty instantly. Soran Omar would later go on trial for his alleged involvement.
