= Islamic State – Kurdistan Province =

Kurdish branch of the Islamic State

- Leaders: Abu Bakr al-Baghdadi (2014–2019) † (Leader of ISIL); Abu Ibrahim al-Hashimi al-Qurashi (2019–2022) † (Leader of ISIL); Abu al-Hasan al-Hashimi al-Qurashi (2022–2022) † (Leader of ISIL); Abu al-Hussein al-Husseini al-Qurashi (2022–2023) † (Leader of ISIL); Abu Hafs al-Hashimi al-Qurashi (2023–2024) (Leader of ISIL)
- Dates active: 2013–2024
- Group: Mostly Kurds
- Active regions: Kurdistan
- Ideology: Islamic Statism
- Part of: Islamic State

The Islamic State – Kurdistan Province (Note: Arabic: الدولة الإسلامية – ولاية كردستان, ad-Dawlah al-Islāmīyah – Wilāyat Kurdistān Sorani: دەوڵەتی ئیسلامی – وەلایەتی کوردستان, Dewłetî Îslamî – Welayetî Kurdistan Kurmanji: دەولەتا ئیسلامیێ – ولایەتا کوردستانێ, Dewleta Îslamiyê – Wilayeta Kurdistanê) was the regional branch of the Islamic State which operated in Kurdistan. Various organized clandestine cell systems operated in support of the group. It was among the earliest branches of the Islamic State, along with the Iraq Province and Levant Province. The Kurdistan Province was dissolved in 2024 after extensive Kurdish and Iraqi operations.

== History ==
In December 2013, there were reports of the Islamic State making a Kurdistan wilayah (province). The purported Kurdistan wilayah was to be under the rule of Kurdish senior militants, who reported directly to the Islamic State's top leaders. The alleged wilayah included Kurdish-majority areas in Iraq, Syria, Turkey, and Iran, and the proclamation of the wilayah was publicly announced by an Islamic State senior leader in Nineveh. Al-Qaeda, whose ideology is based on the thoughts of Osama bin Laden, had also included Kurdistan as a wilayah within their planned caliphate, which reportedly inspired the Islamic State to form a Kurdistan wilayah as well.

Following the Fall of Fallujah, and the Fall of Mosul, the Islamic State declared itself a caliphate on 29 June 2014, with Abu Bakr al-Baghdadi as the caliph.

During the Siege of Kobanî, an Islamic State fighter of Chechen background stated that the Islamic State planned to make Kurdistan into an official Wilayah (province) within its caliphate, although it was repeatedly delayed due to the Islamic State's failure to capture any significant land in Kurdistan. There were various organized cells in Kurdistan, which were connected through their mutual allegiance to the Islamic State. Later, the Kurdistan wilayah was established, and the Islamic State made an official administrative position called the "Wali of Kurdistan".

The Kurdistan Brigades was one of the top jihadist groups among Kurds, and it was allied with Jama'at Ansar al-Islam. Jama'at Ansar al-Islam was pro-Al-Qaeda, while the Kurdistan Brigades was an official faction of Al-Qaeda. They were both allied to the Islamic State of Iraq, which was an Al-Qaeda affiliate at the time. Later in 2010, the Kurdistan Brigades disbanded, and the Islamic State of Iraq also disbanded in April 2013. The Islamic State was founded on April 7, 2013, as a successor of the Islamic State of Iraq, and it became an enemy of Al-Qaeda and its affiliated groups. After the Islamic State was founded, Jama'at Ansar al-Islam fiercely fought against them, with both groups exchanging fire for months. The Islamic State had won the conflict. Later, in July 2014, in a surprising move which sparked many questions and controversies, many Jama'at Ansar al-Islam leaders pledged their allegiance to the Islamic State. On 29 August 2014, over 50 Jama'at Ansar al-Islam commanders, and high-ranking members, pledged their allegiance to Abu Bakr al-Baghdadi. Jama'at Ansar al-Islam, despite its significant losses, continued to operate and oppose the Islamic State. In April 2014, a spokesman of the Kurdistan Brigades released a statement in which he criticised the Kurds who joined the Islamic State.

On Newroz 2015, the Islamic State released a 24-minute propaganda video in Kurdish. The main speaker in the video was Abu Khattab al-Kurdi, who promised that the Islamic State was going to "bring the Caliphate to Kurdistan". The video ended with three Peshmerga soldiers each being beheaded by a different Kurdish militant.

The Islamic State in Kurdistan also claimed responsibility for two bombings in Hasakah, targeting Newroz celebrations, which resulted in as many as 45 people dying.

A Syrian Kurdish activist who lived under the Islamic State for a period of time, in an interview, said that many of the high-ranking Kurds in the Islamic State were Iraqi Kurds, with a significant amount of Iranian Kurds and Turkish Kurds, as well as many Syrian Kurds. He claimed that Syrian Kurds had much less communication with the Islamic State, and therefore were more likely to believe rumours about the Islamic State, but many still joined them. Although he opposed the Islamic State, he refuted claims that the Islamic State was anti-Kurdish, and claimed that they do not differentiate between Kurds and Arabs, and that they do not fight Kurds because they are Kurds, but they fight secular-nationalist Kurdish groups because they are against their religious doctrine. In early 2015, the number of Kurds in the Islamic State was estimated to be 3,000. They were dubbed the "Kurds of the Caliphate" due to their rejection of their Iraqi, Syrian, Turkish, or Iranian citizenships, as well as their rejection of loyalty to the Kurdish nationalist movement.

Abu Mohammad al-Adnani, in a statement released in September 2014, stated "we do not fight the Kurds because they are Kurds. Rather we fight the disbelievers amongst them, the allies of the crusaders and Jews in their war against the Muslims. As for the Muslim Kurds, they are our people and brothers wherever they may be. We spill our blood to save their blood. The Kurds in the ranks of the Islamic State are many, and they are the toughest of fighters against the disbelievers amongst their people."

Mullah Shwan Kurdi joined the Islamic State during its early stages and rose to be a senior member. Mullah Shwan appeared in a video in early 2015, in which he interviewed 20 Peshmerga fighters and 1 Iraqi soldier, who were locked in cages.

Another famous preacher named Ismail Susayi, based in Erbil, also pledged his allegiance to the Islamic State and was arrested in 2018 after he was involved in an attack on governmental offices in Erbil. Dastbar Othman, a Kurdish teen from Germany who frequently visited Susayi during his trips to Iraqi Kurdistan, was also arrested after he moved to Iraqi Kurdistan to be an informant for the Islamic State.

The Islamic State's influence increased quickly in Adıyaman and Bingöl, in Turkish Kurdistan, with many either leaving to join the Islamic State, or forming Islamic State cells in their cities. Adıyaman had the deadliest Islamic State cell in all of Turkey, and out of the 21-person cell, 18 were Kurdish natives of Adıyaman, which led to surprise due to how at that time Kurds were associated with the YPG in the media. Some Kurds in Turkey also preferred living under the Islamic State over living in Turkey, claiming that the Islamic State would not persecute them for being Kurds.

The Kurds who were loyal to the Islamic State were crucial during the Siege of Kobanî, in which both the Kurds of Kobanî as well as the Kurds who travelled there, had guided the Islamic State through the terrain and language barriers. While many of the Kurds of Kobanî welcomed the Islamic State out of genuine support, others welcomed them because they hated the PYD to the point they viewed the Islamic State as a better alternative. The Islamic State changed the official name of Kobani from "Ayn al-Arab" to "Ayn al-Islam".

In 2018, an Iranian Kurdish man named Saryas Sadeghi, who worked as an Islamic State recruiter, had blown himself up at the Shrine of Ruhollah Khomeini. The majority of Kurds in Iran who sympathised with the Islamic State had crossed to Iraqi Kurdistan or to Syria in order to join its Kurdish faction, although a small minority of them crossed into Afghanistan to join the Islamic State – Khorasan Province.

In 2017, a Kurdish group known as the White Flags emerged. American defence and military officials claimed that the White Flags were a union of Kurdish ISIS and Ansar al-Islam remnants, however it was just allegations, as the Kurds of the Islamic State had continued fighting for the Islamic State under sleeper cells. It was also alleged that the White Flags are allied with the Islamic State, however the allegations are baseless as the two groups never interacted. The White Flags have been inactive since 2018. The common consensus was that the White Flags were an Ansar al-Islam faction which attempted to rebrand and failed.

In January 2021, Abu Sadiq, the Wali of Kurdistan, was killed in an ISOF operation which also killed Abu Yasser al-Issawi.

In July 2021, Iraqi ICTS forces collaborated with Kurdish CTG to crackdown on Islamic State cells across the country. Later in December, Kurdish security forces disrupted dozens of Islamic State sleeper cells across Iraqi Kurdistan, and the Kurdistan Region Security Council (KRSC) confirmed that most Islamic State cell members which they arrested have been Kurds. The cell leader was arrested on December 13, in an operation 72 hours after the arrest of 25 Islamic State members from Halabja, Said Sadiq, Khurmal, Sirwan, and Erbil.

Two Kurdish sleeper cells of the Islamic State were disrupted in August 2022, and Kurdistan was referred to as a "fertile ground" for the Islamic State ideology.

In July 2023, an Islamic State commander who was involved in the Camp Speicher massacre was found and arrested in Sulaymaniyah.

In November 2024, in an Iraq-KRG operation, which included the CTG, Iraqi National Security Service, Iraqi warplanes, and Peshmerga commandos, large raids on the Islamic State were launched in Sulaymaniyah, Halabja, Kirkuk, and Ranya. The command structure of the Islamic State in Kurdistan was destroyed during the raids. The Asayish also proclaimed the "dissolution of the Kurdistan Province" as a result of the raids.

== See also ==
- Territory of the Islamic State
