= Jama'at Ansar al-Islam =

Salafi jihadist militant group

- Flag used by Jama'at Ansar al-Islam
- Leaders: Abu Abdullah al-Shafi'i (2007–2010); Abu Hashim al-Ibrahim (2010–2014)
- Dates active: 2007–2025
- Active regions: Iraq (until 2014); Syria
- Ideology: Salafi jihadism
- Size: Peak: 700+ 100 (2024)
- Part of: Rouse the Believers Operations Room (2018–2020); So Be Steadfast Operations Room (2020–2021)

Jama'at Ansar al-Islam (Arabic: جماعة أنصار الإسلام; Congregation of the Supporters of Islam; JAI) was a mostly Kurdish Salafi jihadist militant group active in Syria and Iraq. The group was founded in 2007 after Jamaat Ansar al-Sunna disbanded, and it was modeled after Ansar al-Islam, a group active from 2001 to 2003, although it was a separate group. After participating in the 2024 Syrian opposition offensives and the fall of the Assad regime, it was dissolved and formally incorporated into the Syrian Ministry of Defense under the transitional government.

== History ==
Ansar al-Islam, which was founded and led by Mullah Krekar in the Islamic Emirate of Kurdistan, and operated there until Operation Viking Hammer in March 2003, disbanding afterwards. Abu Abdullah al-Shafi'i escaped from the Kurdistan Region, and founded Jamaat Ansar al-Sunna, which was mostly Arab, but also included some Kurds. In 2007, Jamaat Ansar al-Sunna split into Ansar Ahl al-Sunna, and Jama'at Ansar al-Islam, modeled after the original Ansar al-Islam. In November 2008, an archbishop in Mosul received a threat from Jama'at Ansar al-Islam, warning all Christians to leave or be killed.

Jama'at Ansar al-Islam was active in the Iraqi insurgency. The group claimed attacks against Iraqi security forces, particularly around Mosul and Kirkuk. Jama'at Ansar al-Islam also established a presence in Syria to take part in the Syrian civil war, briefly under the name of "Ansar al-Sham" before reverting to its name. The group cooperated with the Ahfad al-Rasul Brigades to bomb Syrian military compounds in Damascus in August 2012. It also played a role in the Battle of Aleppo and collaborated with several other Salafist groups including al-Qaeda's al-Nusra Front and the Islamic Front. Jama'at Ansar al-Islam remained functioning when many high-ranking members joined ISIS.

While the group was mainly a revival of Ansar al-Islam, the two groups had significant differences. Jama'at Ansar al-Islam was the most popular jihadist group for Kurds, however it was not as uniquely Kurdish as Ansar al-Islam, and was not nationalist either. When Jama'at Ansar al-Islam was founded, Mullah Krekar claimed it had nothing to do with him or the original Ansar al-Islam.

On 29 August 2014, 50 members and commanders of Jama'at Ansar al-Islam announced that they were joining the Islamic State. However, they joined as individuals, and Jama'at Ansar al-Islam continued to oppose ISIS and functioned independently. On 15 December 2011, Jama'at Ansar al-Islam announced a new leader, Abu Hashim al Ibrahim. In November 2015, Abu al-Waleed al-Salafi stated that "a number of leaders of the group, including Abu Hashim Al Ibrahim, the emir of the group, were arrested in early 2014", and did not mention his successor.

In 2016, they fought alongside the Al-Nusra Front in Aleppo during a major offensive in the city. A military commander of the group, Abu Layth al-Tunisi, was reportedly killed in combat during this operation, likely in southwest Aleppo. By July 2018, the Syrian faction of Jama'at Ansar al-Islam was active in Idlib and Latakia Governorate, raiding local Syrian Army outposts. Following the Turkish-Russian agreement to demilitarize Idlib in September 2018, the Syrian branch of Jama'at Ansar al-Islam joined the Rouse the Believers Operations Room with other al-Qaeda-linked groups to oppose any attempts to demilitarize northwestern Syria. The group later joined the So Be Steadfast Operations Room. Jama'at Ansar al-Islam opposed Turkey after the Idlib demilitarization, and began to directly attack Turkish forces in Syria in March 2019.

On 30 October 2019, Jama'at Ansar al-Islam claimed responsibility for an IED attack on a Popular Mobilization Forces vehicle in the Diyala Governorate in northeastern Iraq. By 2021, it distanced itself from its alliances and became more independent.

The group had an estimated 100 fighters in 2024, and around 300 before 2020. It was composed primarily of Kurds, regardless of country. The group also had Syrian Kurdish members, being one of the very few jihadist groups which had a Syrian Kurdish presence. Other ethnicities and foreign jihadists were also prevalent. On 29 January 2025, at the Syrian Revolution Victory Conference, the group announced that it had dissolved along with many other groups and was incorporated into the Ministry of Defense.

On 7 October 2025, United States Central Command announced that their forces conducted a strike in Idlib, Syria on 2 October, killing Muhammad ‘Abd-al-Wahhab al-Ahmad, a senior Jama'at Ansar al-Islam attack planner.
