= Second Soran Unit =

Kurdish Salafi elite militant group

- یەکەی ٢ی سۆران
- Leader: Aso Hawleri
- Dates active: 1980s-2003
- Allegiance: • (Taliban) Kurdistan Islamic Movement (until 1995) • Independent (1995-2001) • Ansar al-Islam (2001-2003)
- Headquarters: Soran (until 1995), Hawraman (1995-2003)
- Size: ~ 400
- Part of: Ansar al-Islam

The Second Soran Unit (Kurdish: یەکەی دووەمی سۆران; SSU) was a Kurdish Salafi jihadist elite militant group active from the late 1980s until 2003.

== History ==
The Second Soran Unit was originally one of the military brigades of the IMK, which gained notoriety when its leader Osman Abdulaziz declared a religious war against the Ba'athist Iraqi government. After the 1991 Iraqi uprisings, when Iraqi Kurdistan gained autonomy, the IMK established many camps in different locations, of which the SSU was assigned to the camp in Soran. The IMK fought against the secular PUK and KDP, although later it reconciled with them and participated in the Kurdistan Regional Government, causing many IMK members to leave or form their own groups. The SSU left the IMK in 1995 and became an independent group led by Asad Muhammad Hasan, also known as Aso Hawleri. It was made up of Kurds and had around 400 fighters, and around 50 Afghan Arabs came to assist the SSU. Soon after its separation from IMK, the SSU relocated to Hawraman in Halabja Governorate, which was historically a stronghold of Kurdish Islamist groups. The SSU had modern and advanced weapons, including firearms and a very large arsenal of large munitions, as well as DShKs and 106mm artillery shells, and was one of the most powerful militant groups of its time. Its goal was to control all of Greater Kurdistan and rule it with Sharia, and it also supported the establishment of Sharia internationally.

The SSU had a presence in Afghanistan when Osama bin Laden was there. The SSU also sent many of its fighters to Afghanistan to receive training from Taliban and al-Qaeda seniors during the period of the First Islamic Emirate of Afghanistan. During the 2001 invasion of Afghanistan, a Kurdish ID card belonging to Aso Hawleri was found in a computer in an al-Qaeda safehouse in Kabul.

In September 2001, the SSU merged with the Tawhid Islamic Front and the Islamic Resistance Movement, two other groups who also left the IMK, and formed Jund al-Islam, which later merged with the Islah Group to form Ansar al-Islam. The Second Soran Unit became one of the eight military units of Ansar al-Islam, and Aso Hawleri became the military leader of Ansar al-Islam, and was considered the 3rd highest ranking Ansar al-Islam member after Mullah Krekar and Abu Abdullah al-Shafi'i. In 2003, US forces pushed Ansar al-Islam out of Iraqi Kurdistan during Operation Viking Hammer. The SSU trained a group of Iraqi and Syrian jihadists as well. On 10 October 2003, Aso Hawleri was captured in Mosul by the 101st Airborne Division. The SSU, and Ansar al-Islam in general, began to decline after 2003.
