= Mashouq al-Khaznawi =

Kurdish sheikh killed by the Syrian government

Sheikh of the Martyrs Mashouq al-Khaznawi
- Born: January 1st, 1958; Tel Marouf, Qamishli, Al-Hasakah Governorate, Syria
- Disappeared: May 10th, 2005; Damascus, Syria
- Died: May 30th, 2005 (aged 47)
- Cause of death: Torture
- Body discovered: June 1st, 2005
- Resting place: Qaddour Bey Cemetery, Qamishli
- Education: Various Islamic institutes and universities
- Children: 16
- Father: Izzeddin al-Khaznawi

Muhammad Mashouq Izzeddin al-Khaznawi (Arabic: معشوق الخزنوي; Kurdish: مەعشووقی خەزنەوی, Maşûqê Xeznewî) was a Syrian Kurdish sheikh who was killed by the Ba'athist Syrian government in 2005. His death was a cause of the Rojava conflict.

== Biography ==
He was the son of Izzeddin Al-Khaznawi, and belonged to the Khaznawi family, a very influential Kurdish clerical family which founded the Khaznawi tariqa, a branch of the Naqshbandi tariqa. The family originates from Khazna, a village in Al-Hasakah Governorate. Mashouq al-Khaznawi was born in Tel Marouf in Qamishli on January 1, 1958. He had 16 children. He studied under his father, as well as Mullah Abdullah Qartimini. He also graduated from the Institute of Sharia section of the Institute of Islamic Sciences, in Bab al-Jabiyah in Damascus. He then went to Medina and obtained a bachelor's degree in Islamic Sciences. He has a bachelors, masters, and a doctorate in Islamic Sciences from various universities. He participated in many Islamic conferences worldwide, including in Riyadh and Vienna, and has held many seminars in Europe and other parts of the world.

Before he began his Kurdish activism, the Syrian government tolerated and sometimes even promoted his sermons due to his moderate stance. During the 2004 Kurdish uprising, he began to speak on Kurdish activism and called for a Kurdish revolt against the oppressive Baathist government. Khaznawi was described as being the "center of the struggle" during the clashes in 2004, and the Syrian government considered him a "separatist threat". One of his most famous speeches was delivered on Newroz, as well as his fiery speech on the anniversary of the death of Farhad Muhammad Ali, on April 8, 2005. He stated that he knew he would be killed soon, and that it would not stop him. Khaznawi claimed that violence was necessary, and one of his famous quotes was "rights are not given as a charity, rights are achieved by force." He continued his activism until he was ambushed by the Syrian regime when he was returning home from his work at the Islamic Studies Center in Damascus, on May 10, 2005. His torture was allegedly a direct order by Maher al-Assad, who was worried because of Khaznawi's increasing influence amongst the Kurdish minority. Khaznawi died after 20 days of torture, and his body was dumped in Deir ez-Zor on June 1. Although he was a religious cleric, secular Kurds also saw him as their leader, earning him a similar legacy to Sheikh Said, Mahmud Barzanji, and Mustafa Barzani. Yazidis also accepted him.

On June 1, a man who claimed to be a government official approached Khaznawi's sons on the street and told them "you will hear happy news of your father." After a few days, state security agents took Khaznawi's sons to see Khaznawi. His dead body was nearly unrecognisable, his famous thick beard had been ripped off, his teeth were broken, and his skin was badly burnt by acid. He was also torn into 3 pieces. The Syrian government told the Khaznawi family that independent criminals, mostly from Deir ez-Zor, had confessed to killing Mashouq al-Khaznawi, although his family did not believe them. One of Khaznawi's sons, Morshed al-Khaznawi, stated that "the Syrian authorities fabricated an ugly play and gave us the corpse, in the end, the Syrian authorities have complete and total responsibility for what happened and for assassinating the sheikh." Another of Khaznawi's sons, Mohammed al-Khaznawi, stated that "my father was subjected to a lot of harassment before his death because of his stands backing the Kurdish cause."

His body returned to Qamishli in early June, and his sons wrapped his body with the Kurdish flag and buried him. He was buried in the Qaddour Bey Cemetery, and became known as "Sheikh of the Martyrs". Tens of thousands of Kurds attended the funeral, and many armed themselves and began an uprising against Syria, which escalated to the Rojava conflict. Kurdish political organisations, regardless of their different ideologies, all commemorated his death. A popular Anti-Assad activist, Riad Darar, was arrested for attending the funeral.
