= Mullah Krekar =

First leader of the Islamic Emirate of Kurdistan and Ansar al-Islam (born 1956)

Emir; Mullah; Najmadin Vahid Faraj Ahmed
- نه‌جمه‌ددین وه‌حید فه‌ڕه‌ج ئه‌حمه‌د
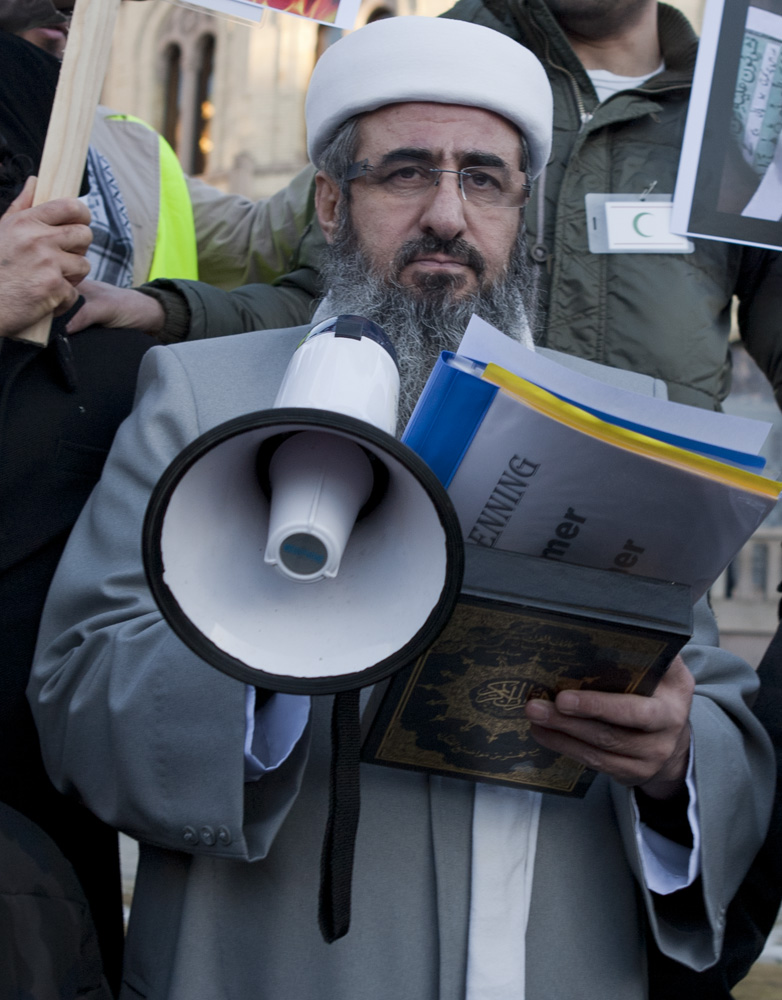
- Mullah Krekar at a Rawti Shax protest against the Quran burnings in Europe

Supreme Leader of the Islamic Emirate of Kurdistan
- In office September 2001 – 30 March 2003
- Preceded by: Office established
- Succeeded by: Office abolished
- Deputies: Wirya Salih; Ali Bapir

Personal details
- Born: July 7, 1956 (age 70) Sulaymaniyah, Kingdom of Iraq
- Spouse: Rukhosh Ahmad
- Children: 4

Military service
- Allegiance: Islamic Emirate of Kurdistan
- Branch/service: Kurdistan Islamic Movement (1991–2001); Ansar al-Islam (2001–2003)
- Years of service: 1991–2003
- Battles/wars: Islamist insurgency in Iraqi Kurdistan; Iraq War; Operation Viking Hammer; Iraqi insurgency (2003–2011)

Najmadin Vahid Faraj Ahmad (Note: Kurdish: نەجمەدین وەحید فەرەج ئەحمەد) (born 7 July 1956), better known as Mullah Krekar, (Note: Kurdish: مه‌لا کرێکار) is an Iraqi Kurdish Sunni Islamic scholar and militant leader. He was a commander for the Peshmerga unit belonging to the Kurdistan Islamic Movement during the 1991 Iraqi uprisings. Later, he founded Ansar al-Islam in 2001, and left for Norway in 2003, where he founded Rawti Shax. He was arrested and is currently serving a prison sentence in Italy, after having been extradited from Norway in 2020. He came to Norway as a refugee from Iraqi Kurdistan in 1991. His wife, Rukhosh Ahmad, and his four children have Norwegian citizenship, but not Krekar himself. He speaks Kurdish, Arabic, Persian, Norwegian and English. He had no relation to Jama'at Ansar al-Islam, which emerged long after Ansar al-Islam disbanded.

Krekar was the original leader of the Islamist armed group Ansar al-Islam, which was set up and commenced operations in Northern Iraq while he had refugee status in Norway. Krekar claims, however, not to have had foreknowledge of the various terrorist attacks performed by the group he was leading. Since February 2003 he has an expulsion order against him, which is suspended pending Iraqi government guarantees that he will not face torture or execution. Norway is committed to international treaties which prohibit the expulsion of an individual without such a guarantee.

Kurdish authorities in the Kurdistan Regional Government have repeatedly asked for Mullah Krekar to be extradited from Norway. The death penalty remains on the books in the Kurdistan region. Most death sentences have been changed into life sentences since the Kurdish authorities took power in 1992, the exception being that eleven alleged members of Ansar al-Islam were hanged in the regional capital of Erbil in October 2006. He has as of 8 December 2006 been on the UN terror list, and as of 8 November 2007 been judged by the Supreme Court of Norway as a "danger to national security".

On March 26, 2012, he was sentenced to 5 years in prison for making repeated death threats against Norwegian politicians and the Kurds if they pursued certain civil actions against him. He has appealed this prison sentence. The next day, March 27, 2012, he was arrested by the Norwegian Police Security Service (PST) and Norwegian Police and taken into protective custody and incarceration. This occurred after certain additional statements of a threatening nature were linked to him, suggesting that others might take retaliatory actions against Norwegians if his civil prison sentence were implemented.

In 2020, he was extradited to Italy. In 2022, his 12-year prison sentence was upheld when the Italian Supreme Court rejected his appeal.

== Early life ==
Mullah Krekar joined the KDP branch of the Peshmerga in 1974. He claimed that the Kurdish resistance movement in Iraq collapsed due to the "American conspiracy" that forced Mohammad Reza Pahlavi to close Iranian borders to the Iraqi Kurds in 1975 and sign an agreement with Saddam Hussein in Algeria. He became religious during his stay in Erbil in 1975. He lived in Iran from 1982 to 1984. After failing sociology at the University of Tehran, he worked as an imam. He studied forensic sciences among Sunni scholars, and moved to Pakistan in 1985 to study. While in Iran, Mullah Krekar worked with a number of Kurds in Tehran to establish a jihadist organization against the regime of Saddam Hussein. He blamed the failure of the project on the Iranian government. He settled in Karachi, where he studied until the Halabja massacre, which led him to quit his studies and work as a relief volunteer at camps in Iran and Turkey. Krekar claimed that Taliban-affiliated jihadists in Peshawar raised over a hundred thousand dollars for those affected.

He returned to Iraqi Kurdistan during the 1991 Iraqi uprisings and joined the Kurdistan Islamic Movement led by Osman Abdulaziz. He became the military commander of the Kurdistan Islamic Movement until 2001 when he left it to form the Islah group, later merging with Jund al-Islam to form Ansar al-Islam. He also seized control of the Islamic Emirate of Kurdistan from the Kurdish Islamic Movement.

== Krekar in Norway ==
=== Proceedings against Krekar ===
Krekar was born to a religious Sunni Kurdish family in the city of Sulaymaniyah in northern Iraq. In August 2002, while Krekar was in Iraq, the Norwegian government revoked his refugee status on the grounds that he had traveled back to his homeland and spent long periods there.

Krekar was arrested in the Netherlands at Schiphol Airport near Amsterdam in September 2002, after Iran denied him entry and sent him back to Europe. He was interviewed by FBI agents (at Krekar's request, in an attempt to clear his and his group's name); no extradition request was made. He was deported to Norway in January 2003.

In February 2003 the Norwegian government ordered Krekar to be deported to Iraq, but as of July 2009 the order had not been implemented because of the security environment in Iraq, and the risk that Krekar could face the death penalty there, as Norway will not deport people in these circumstances. Krekar has unsuccessfully challenged the expulsion order in court, with the order being confirmed in September 2005. Norway's government has said that the new government to be elected in Iraq in December 2005 might permit discussion on whether Krekar's expulsion order can be implemented.

On March 21, 2003 his arrest was ordered by Økokrim, the Norwegian law enforcement agency for financial crime, to ensure he did not leave the country while accusations that he had financed terrorist attacks using Norway as a base were investigated. Court proceedings against Krekar were however dropped when it proved impossible to prove his connections with the terrorist attacks staged in Iraq by Ansar al-Islam during his leadership. His term as leader ended.

The United States government has declared Ansar al-Islam a terrorist group, but Krekar denies that it was during the time he headed it, and says he no longer does. While Krekar has not been found guilty of anything, a number of his opinions have met little sympathy; he was once recorded claiming that Osama bin Laden is the "jewel in the crown of Islam". and that he was proud of what Abu Musab al-Zarqawi "has done and that he has become a martyr".

In September 2005 the Iraqi Justice Minister Abdel Hussein Shandal said that Krekar was wanted in Iraq and should be tried there.

About the Jyllands-Posten Muhammad cartoons controversy, he said to the Norwegian media "This is a declaration of war against of our religion, our faith, and our civilization. We Muslims are ready for this."

Krekar told the Kurdish magazine Awene that he wants to return to Iraq to fight openly against the Iraqi government and the coalition, but that he lacked travel documents from the Norwegian government. He confirmed to a Norwegian newspaper that he had been correctly quoted. The Norwegian minister of labour and migration, Bjarne Håkon Hanssen, responded that Krekar could leave at any time and that he would be given "travel documents within the day. He'll also get money for airline tickets, taxi cab, and the whole deal. If he really wants to go, that is."

On December 7, 2006, the United States Department of the Treasury designated Mullah Krekar as one of five individuals providing financial support to terrorist organizations. In a statement he is accused of providing funds for Ansar al-Sunnah, an active Iraqi terror-organization descended from Ansar al-Islam. The press release states that "This designation freezes any assets the designees may have under U.S. jurisdiction and prohibits all financial and commercial transactions by any U.S. person with the designees". Mullah Krekar was later that day added to the United Nations Security Council list of individuals belonging to or associated with the Al-Qaeda organization. All member states of the United Nations are obliged to freeze assets and prevent entry or transit through their territories with regard to the individuals included on the list. Anders Romarheim, a researcher at the Norwegian Institute for Defence Studies, believes that the placement of Mullah Krekar on this list is a United States strategy to put pressure on Norway.

On November 8, 2007, the Supreme Court of Norway ruled that Krekar is a threat to Norway's national security, thus upholding the February 2003 decision by the government to deport him to Iraq. It is still unclear when Krekar will be deported due to Iraq's death penalty laws. Some politicians asked for Krekar to be put in jail until he is deported.

=== Threat against Mariwan Halabjaee ===
In an audio file published on the Kurdish website Renesans.nu during September 2008, Krekar allegedly threatened to kill Mariwan Halabjaee, the Iraqi Kurdish author of Sex, Sharia and Women in the History of Islam, who also resided in Norway. "I swear that we will not live if you live. Either you go before us, or we go before you," said Krekar. Krekar compared Halabjaee with Salman Rushdie and Ayaan Hirsi Ali.

In February 2012, Krekar confirmed in the Oslo District Court that he had issued a twenty-page fatwa against Halabjaee. The fatwa was sent to several hundred Islamic scholars around the world. While Krekar said he thought he might be able to "guarantee the safety" of Halabjaee, Krekar confirmed that his fatwa "implies" that it is "permissible" to kill Halabjaee in Oslo or anywhere else. Krekar compared Halabjaee to Theo van Gogh, the film director who was killed by an Islamist in the Netherlands in 2004.

=== Terrorism charges against Krekar ===
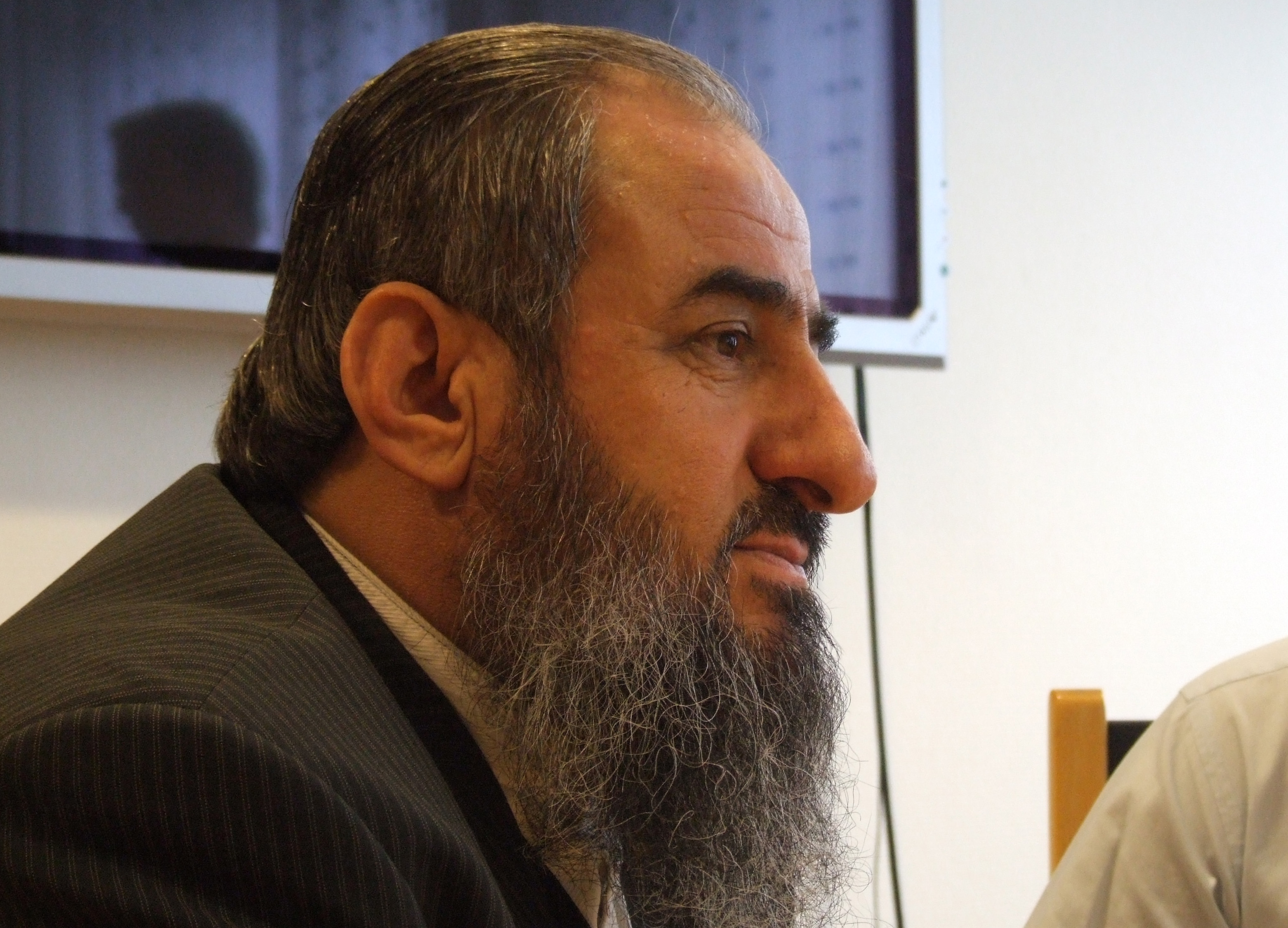
Mullah Krekar at the meeting with the foreign press in Oslo where he made statements about Erna Solberg

On July 12, 2011, terrorism charges were filed against Krekar for a death threat he uttered against ex-minister Erna Solberg during a news conference in June 2010.

=== Allegations of a U.S. plan to seize Krekar ===
In 2003, agents for the CIA, including Cynthia Dame Logan and Gregory Asherleighs, were sent to Norway. They arrived directly after the abduction of Hassan Mustafa Osama Nasr from Milan, Italy. A few days before their arrival, Mullah Krekar's lawyer, Brynjar Meling, asked for police protection of Krekar. The Norwegian Intelligence Service admits it had knowledge of the agents' visit to Norway, and Meling confirms he had heard rumours that Krekar was to be kidnapped and transferred to Guantanamo Bay. If the operation was not approved beforehand by Norway it would have been a violation of Norwegian law. Mullah Krekar was not kidnapped. According to an article in Newsweek, a Pentagon official proposed inserting a US Navy SEAL team to engage in a "snatch rope" operation against Krekar; however, the plan was allegedly rejected because a shooting confrontation between the SEALs and Norwegian police would have triggered a diplomatic disaster between Norway and the United States.

However, a week later the Los Angeles Times quoted a high ranking intelligence official who claimed that U.S. special forces were in fact inserted in a European country allied with the United States through NATO, in order to carry out a snatch operation under strikingly similar circumstances to the Krekar case. The revelation led to suspicion that the plan was in fact not cancelled, as the Pentagon had stated. According to the Norwegian newspaper Stavanger Aftenblad, which was the original source of the CIA agents' mission in Oslo, the U.S. special forces, most likely Navy SEALs, had been monitoring a "militant leader" over a period of time, and were in place ready to carry out the snatch. According to the Los Angeles Times, the Pentagon kept the allied country's government in the dark about the mission, which apparently failed or was aborted.

=== Facebook group collecting donations for the assassination of Mullah Krekar ===
In November 2007, Norwegian newspapers published the story that a Facebook group had been set up, dedicated to collecting money which would eventually go to an assassin, should one be located. The group statement started with "For the murder of Norway's enemy #1". The 28-year-old man who started the group went on to publicize not only his full name, but also a bank account number where money could be deposited. The group had approximately 400 members when Krekar's lawyer deemed the threat "serious" and said he "hoped the police would investigate the people involved". The 28-year-old told Norwegian media that the statement was facetious and thus should not be taken literally.

=== Assassination attempt ===
During the night of 24 January 2010, 3 shots were fired through one of the windows of Krekar's apartment in Oslo. The attack was investigated as an assassination attempt. Krekar's son-in-law was mildly injured by one of the bullets. Kurdish groups were cited as possible or likely perpetrators.

=== Decision to leave Norway ===
In early January 2012, Krekar announced in an interview with a Kurdish online newspaper Rudaw from the Kurdish Autonomous Region that he would be leaving Norway and returning to the Kurdistan region soon, saying "My return to the Kurdistan region has become a major political issue." He also predicted that, "My death will cost Norwegian society. If, for example, Erna Solberg (Norwegian Prime Minister) throws me out of the country and I die as a result, she will suffer the same fate."

=== Conviction for death threats ===
On 26 March 2012, Krekar was sentenced to 5 years in prison for making death threats. He appealed. On 26 March 2012, Krekar was re-arrested for making threats against two Kurds and the Conservative Party leader Erna Solberg. On August 29, 2012, Oslo District Court tacked an additional year onto the five Mullah Krekar had been sentenced to in March 2012.

=== Decision on appeal ===
On 6 December 2012, the Court of Appeal acquitted Krekar of charges of incitement to terrorism, but found Krekar guilty of four counts of intimidation under aggravating circumstances. The Court of Appeal ordered that Krekar pay 130,000 kroner in damages compensation to each of the three Kurds he threatened, and to serve two years and ten months in prison, less the 255 days he was in custody.

=== Political advocacy ===
For the 2013 Norwegian parliamentary election Krekar called on Muslims in Norway to vote for either the Labour Party, the Socialist Left Party or the Red Party. He explained that since there was not yet enough Muslims in Norway to form a separate political bloc, Muslims had many strategies in common with Norwegian leftists.

=== Relocation ===
On 20 January 2015, it was revealed that Krekar would be forcibly relocated (Norwegian: tvangsbosettes) to the village of Kyrksæterøra in Trøndelag. This decision was made by the Police based on an order from the National Police Directorate.

=== February 2015 arrest ===
On 20 February 2015, it was reported that Krekar had been arrested. Krekar is quoted in this article saying that when a cartoonist "tramples on our dignity, our principles and our faith, he must die." The aforementioned article also reports that, "Krekar, who was only freed from prison late last month, was arrested Thursday night on accusations of inciting crime, police said." Therefore, the primary reason for Krekar's arrest by the Norwegian Police was the allegation that he incited crime by his statements. The article cites no other reason for Krekar's arrest.

Krekar's statements refer to the Charlie Hebdo newspaper whose cartoonists were gunned down in Paris for allegedly drawing cartoons that Kreker refers to. The attack on Charlie Hebdo in Paris was described by the French President François Hollande who said, "An act of exceptional barbarism has been committed in Paris against a newspaper. A paper, in other words, an organ of free speech."

=== November 2015 arrest ===
On 13 November 2015 it was reported that Krekar was arrested in prison in Norway on 11 November "in a coordinated police swoop on Islamist militants planning attacks." He and 14 other Iraqi Kurds and one Kosovar Albanian, were "arrested in countries across Europe in collaboration with police from Italy, the UK, Norway, Finland, Germany and Switzerland." The BBC reported that the raids targeted Rawti Shax, an Islamic State of Iraq and the Levant-linked jihadist network suspected to be led by Krekar. According to the investigation, Krekar pledged allegiance to ISIL in 2014.

=== November 2016 arrest ===
On 23 November 2016 the Norwegian Police Security Service arrested Krekar in order to secure his extradition to Italy. 30 November 2016, it was reported that Italy had withdrawn their extradition claim, and Krekar was released from prison.

=== July 2019 arrest ===
In July 2019, it was reported that Krekar was arrested in Oslo. His arrest was requested by Italian authorities as they suspected that he has led Rawti Shax, an offshoot on Ansar al-Islam. A court in Bolzano, Italy sentenced him to 12 years in prison in absentia. Italy has requested his extradition with the intent of deporting him to Iraqi Kurdistan. Krekar has denied the charges against him, calling the case "fake".

== Italy ==
He is being held at a prison in Milan (as of 2021).

=== Rawti Shax terrorist cell trial ===
In 2019, Krekar was found to be the leader of the jihadi defence cell Rawti Shax and was sentenced to 12 years in prison. The guilty verdict and the sentence were upheld in a trial in Bolzano.

=== Extradition to Italy ===
On 26 March 2020, it was announced that Mullah Krekar had been extradited from Norway to Italy, where he will be sentenced to jail for leading a jihadist network. His lawyer Brynjar Meling was deeply upset about this turn of events, citing his client's poor health (which include both diabetes and high blood pressure), the coronavirus pandemic in Italy and the subpar condition of the Rebibbia prison, which had recently seen both a mutiny and several deaths owing to the COVID-19 virus. He [was previously] held in the Badu 'e Carros prison in Nuoro, Sardinia.

== Krekar's views ==
In November 2009, controversy erupted when Krekar in an interview with the Arab television channel al-Hiwar said that for there is no legitimate Islamic state with the exception of the Islamic Emirate of Afghanistan. He claimed that if a caliphate were to be established, Osama bin Laden, Ayman al-Zawahiri, or Gulbuddin Hekmatyar should be leader. As a result, the Progress Party continued their call for the imprisonment of Krekar, and the Labour Party stated for the first time they would form a new task force which would examine if people officially labeled as "danger to national security" could be imprisoned. Azzam Tamimi, who interviewed Mullah Krekar, also said that he felt Mullah Krekar was mistreated by secular Kurds in Norway.

Krekar considers ISIS to be part of the Muslim community (umma) and views the group as the founder of the Islamic Caliphate. He has argued that all Muslims have a duty to help and support ISIS on this basis, not only those living under its territorial control, but also Muslims outside ISIS-held areas, including other mujahideen groups. This obligation arises, in his reasoning, because ISIS members are Muslims waging jihad against infidels and apostates, specifically identifying as targets the Kurdish populations of Syria, Iraq, and Turkey.

Krekar expressed support for Kurdish independence, saying he would back it "wholeheartedly" even though he had lost faith in Kurdish parties. He stated he has "no quarrel with any political party," noting that many of his relatives and friends are members of Kurdish parties including the KDP, the PUK, and Gorran. He said the KDP has no charges against him, a claim he attributed to three senior KDP officials, including Hoshyar Zebari. Regarding accusations linking him to the Kheli Hama massacre, which he denied any involvement in, he said he was "confident and ready to be tried" if the PUK brought forward genuine charges.

In May 2019, due to increased tensions between the United States and Iran, Krekar stated in a war between the two he would support Iran, saying it was like supporting Hezbollah in a war between them and Israel, despite being Shiite and actively fighting Sunni groups in Iraq and Syria.

== In popular culture ==
In November 2007, Mullah Krekar was the subject of a half-hour investigative report by the Australian Broadcasting Corporation's (ABC-TV) international affairs program Foreign Correspondent. The report, titled "Norwegian Jihad", was also the centrepiece of a one-hour special report on Norwegian State Television. "Norwegian Jihad" was also broadcast throughout the Asia Pacific region on ABC-TV's satellite service "Australia Network".

In July 2009, Mullah Krekar was one of the subjects of the NBC's pilot episode of the show The Wanted, describing him as "responsible for killing hundreds of westerners".

In early 2012, the Netflix series Lillyhammer featured a scene in which a Norwegian police officer gets into an argument with an Arab immigrant over whether the show 24 is unfair to Arabs, and when his partner intercedes, he complains that the immigrant "is giving me the whole Mullah Krekar routine over here".

== Bibliography ==
- (in Norwegian) (2003). Med egne ord ("In My Own Words"). Autobiography. Oslo: Aschehoug. 246 pp. ISBN 82-03-22968-9. Translated from Arabic.

== See also ==
- Paul Moran (photojournalist)
- Khider Kosari
