= Kurdistan Brigades =

Militant Islamist organization

- کەتیبەکانی کوردستان
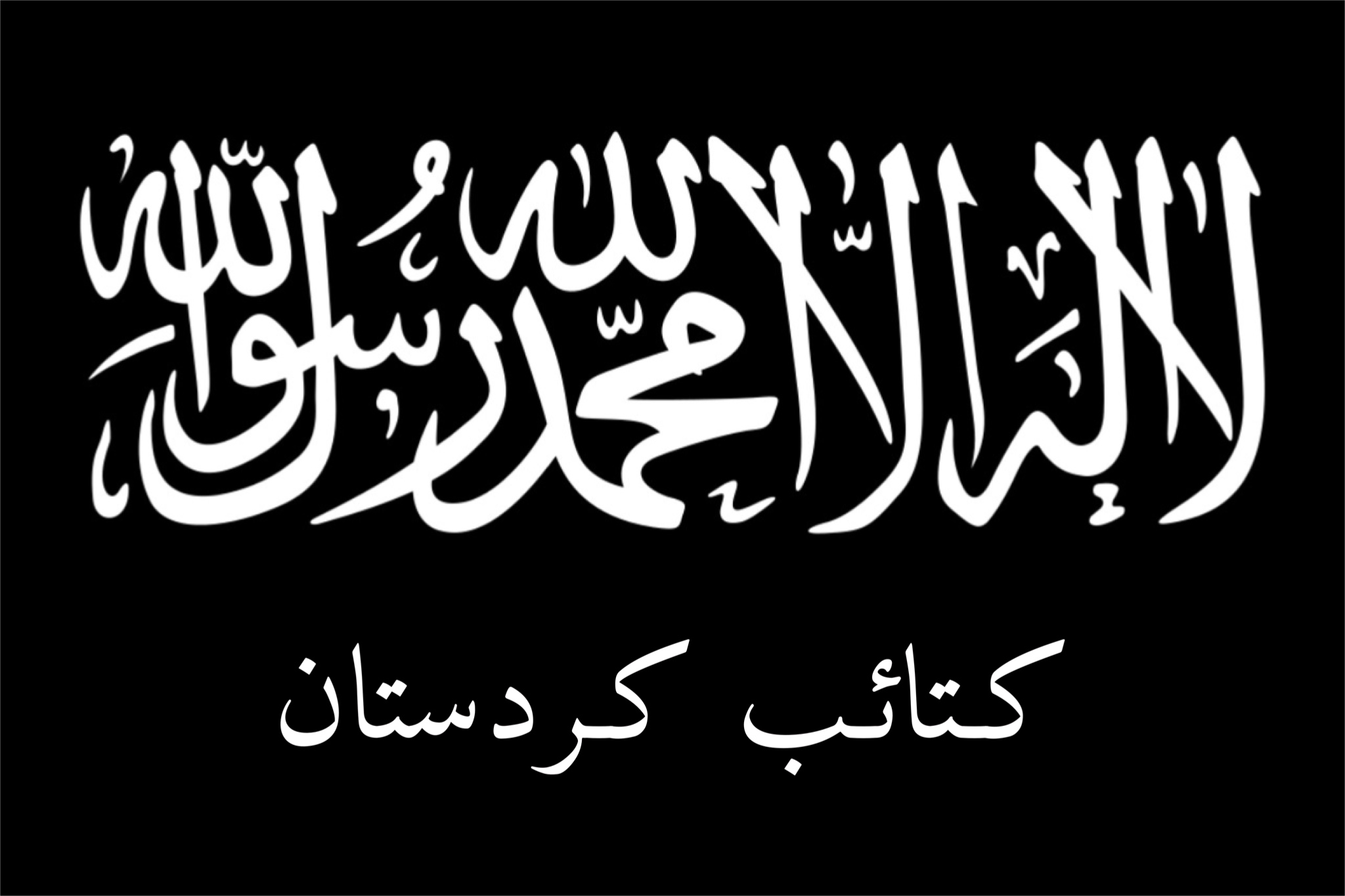
- The group's flag, which is a Shahada with "Kurdistan Brigades" written under it
- Leaders: Dilshad Kalari (unknown to unknown) Abdullah Hassan al-Sorani (2007 to unknown): al-Sorani has released public statements of behalf of AQKB and is believed to be the group’s official spokesman.
- Dates active: 2001–present, largely inactive after 2010
- Headquarters: Iraqi Kurdistan, Iranian Kurdistan
- Ideology: Islamic extremism Salafist Qutbism; Salafist Jihadism; Wahhabism; Anti-Zionism
- Part of: al-Qaeda
- Wars: War on terror: Iraq War; Islamic Army–Al-Qaeda conflict

The Kurdistan Brigades (Arabic: كتائب كردستان, Kurdish: کەتیبەکانی کوردستان) are a Kurdish militant Islamist organization, primarily active in the Kurdish regions of Iraq and Iran. It is the official Kurdish branch of al-Qaeda. It has also launched several attacks on the Kurdistan Regional Government in northern Iraq (Iraqi Kurdistan). The group has been overshadowed by other Islamist factions but remains active.

== Formation ==
The Kurdistan Brigades were founded in 2001 in the Hamrin Mountains, as an official Kurdish faction of Al-Qaeda. It was founded by former Ansar al-Islam militants.The creation of the Kurdistan Brigades was announced by Al-Qaeda in March 2007 through a video titled "Back to the Mountains." From 2007 to 2010, the group waged an insurgency against the Kurdistan Regional Government (KRG), carrying out numerous attacks targeting local authorities. In addition to their operations in Iraqi Kurdistan, they were also active in Iranian Kurdistan..

Its ranks also included Kurds who were frustrated by the cooperation of the Kurdistan Region with the central Iraqi government and the Peshmerga withdrawal from certain Kurdish regions such as Kirkuk.

The group is considered to be relatively small, but it has camps in the Iranian Kurdish towns of Mariwan and Sanandaj.

In April 2014, the Kurdistan Brigades released a statement in which they criticised the Islamic State and called on Kurds to not join it.

== Attacks ==
The group has launched several attacks, the largest being against KRG's Ministry of Interior in Erbil that killed 19 people in May 2007. AQKB killed seven border guards and one PUK security officer in Penjwan in July 2007. In September 2010, two police officers were hurt by a failed suicide attack in Sulaymaniyah.
