= Islamic Emirate of Kurdistan =

Former unrecognized Islamic state in Iraqi Kurdistan

Islamic Emirate of Kurdistan میرنشینی ئیسلامیی کوردستان Mîrnişîna Îslamiya Kurdistanê
- 1994–2003
- The flag used during the IMK period from 1994 to 2001 The flag used during the AAI period from 2001 to 2003 Flag

- Islamic Emirate of Kurdistan (dark grey)
- Status: Part of the Kurdistan Region (1994–2001); Unrecognized independent state (2001–2003)
- Capital: Byara
- Largest city: Halabja
- Official languages: Kurdish
- Religion: Sunni Islam
- Government: Islamic emirate
- Emir
  - 2001–2003: Mullah Krekar
- Deputies
  - 2001–2003: Abu Abdullah al-Shafi'i
  - 2001–2003: Ali Bapir
- History
  - Established: 1994
  - Disestablished: March 30, 2003
- Currency: Iranian rial, Iraqi dinar (de facto)
- Today part of: Kurdistan Region

The Islamic Emirate of Kurdistan (Kurdish: میرنشینی ئیسلامیی کوردستان) was an unrecognized and independent Kurdish state located in the Halabja Governorate, established in the aftermath of the Gulf War. It had been outside the control of the Iraqi government since 1991, and was a self-governing entity within the Kurdistan Region in 1994, and officially declared independence in 2001. It dissolved after Operation Viking Hammer in 2003.

== History ==
=== Background ===
The 1991 uprisings in Iraq included the Kurdistan Democratic Party (KDP), Patriotic Union of Kurdistan (PUK), and the Kurdistan Islamic Movement (IMK), which rebelled against the Iraqi government and established the autonomous Kurdistan Region. The IMK continued to have a significant presence in the Kurdistan Region. Later, the Iraqi Kurdish Civil War erupted between the KDP and PUK in May 1994. Osman Abdulaziz presented the IMK as an alternative to the corruption of the KDP and PUK. The IMK and the KDP were allies, although they clashed occasionally. As part of the agreements, control of the Kurdistan Region was divided into three sections. The KDP was given Duhok Governorate and Erbil Governorate, the PUK was given Sulaymaniyah Governorate, and the IMK was given Halabja Governorate. The emirate was a part of the Kurdistan Region, although not under the jurisdiction of the Kurdistan Regional Government. When the IMK was incorporated into the KRG, some left the IMK and formed their own groups, which continued to operate in the emirate.

Among the groups were the Islah Group led by Mullah Krekar, the Kurdistan Justice Group led by Ali Bapir, and Jund al-Islam (a merger of the Tawhid Islamic Front, the Islamic Resistance Movement, and the Second Soran Unit) led by Abu Abdullah al-Shafi'i. Secular and Islamist forces were united by Kurdish identity during the 1991 Iraqi uprisings. When the Kurdistan Region was established in 1992, IMK members claimed that God had supported the Kurdish forces in expelling the Iraqi Army. The IMK had influence throughout all of the Kurdistan Region, although it was centered in Halabja. Early during the 1991 Iraqi uprisings, IMK delegations visited Osama bin Laden and told him about the atrocities that Saddam Hussein was committing against Kurds. After al-Qaeda relocated to Sudan in 1991, a senior al-Qaeda instructor visited Iraqi Kurdistan to train the IMK in 1992. Mullah Krekar was the military commander of the IMK from 1991 until he left to form Islah in 2001. The IMK consisted of its political wing, which governed the emirate, and its military wing, the IMK-Peshmerga, which consisted of six units and had been an official branch of the Peshmerga since the establishment of the Kurdistan Region in 1991, while the KDP and PUK also had their own Peshmerga branches.

In 2001, Mullah Krekar seized control of the unstable emirate and declared independence, and stated his intentions of expanding the Islamic emirate to include all of Greater Kurdistan. Mullah Krekar presented the Islamic emirate as an independent Kurdish state and claimed that it would not expand past Kurdistan. In the Islamic emirate, Islah and Jund al-Islam merged to form Ansar al-Islam, which acted as the military of the Islamic emirate. When Ansar al-Islam was founded, Osama bin Laden donated $300,000 to the group.

Mullah Krekar, leader of Ansar al-Islam, was the Emir of the Emirate, while Abu Abdullah al-Shafi'i and Ali Bapir were his deputies. With the Islamic Emirate of Kurdistan under a de facto embargo from all sides, Kurdish jihadists from Iran gave crucial support and set up networks that illegally smuggled to the Islamic Emirate of Kurdistan.

=== Life under the Islamic Emirate ===
The emirate was described as a "Mini-Taliban state". Like Mullah Krekar, many Ansar al-Islam fighters and leaders also held nationalist views and treated the new emirate as a victory of the Kurdish independence movement. They were also traditionalists who promoted the Kurdish culture socially. However, elements of nationalism which contradicted Islam were abandoned. It was also reported that Ansar al-Islam enforced strict Sharia law, committed atrocities against the Yarsani minority, and harshly persecuted Sufis. The Islamic Emirate of Kurdistan had diplomatic relations with the Islamic Emirate of Afghanistan under Mullah Omar, and would send Kurds to Afghanistan to receive training from the Taliban or Al-Qaeda. They also sent delegations to Osama bin Laden in Afghanistan. The IRGC were accused of being reckless about what was happening at their borders. Mullah Krekar and Ansar al-Islam had both stressed the Kurdish character of the emirate.

After the September 11 attacks, al-Qaeda sought to use the Islamic Emirate of Kurdistan as a base for future operations. Abu Musab al-Zarqawi left Afghanistan and was smuggled into the emirate with the help of Kurds from Iran and Europe. He briefly stayed in the emirate, and eventually relocated to Al-Anbar, where he became much more notorious. The Islamic Emirate of Kurdistan attracted some Taliban veterans, consisting of Afghan Arabs as well as Pashtuns, who had more ethnic and linguistic similarities with the Kurds. The overwhelming majority of jihadists had always been local Kurds. At its peak in 2002, Ansar al-Islam had over 700 fighters, over 90% being Kurdish. The volunteers who came from Afghanistan, around 70 individuals, had primarily served as advisors, instructors, and ambassadors.

Saddam Hussein was aware of the Islamic Emirate, and considered Ansar al-Islam a separatist threat, and attempted to gather intelligence against them. This was confirmed by the Senate Report on Iraqi WMD Intelligence in 2004, and the Select Committee on Intelligence in September 2006. Mullah Krekar had threatened to personally kill Saddam Hussein if Iraq tried anything against the Islamic Emirate of Kurdistan.

=== Collapse ===
After launching the invasion of Iraq, the government of Bülent Ecevit denied the United States permission to enter Iraq from Turkish territory. The United States launched Operation Viking Hammer in 2003. After the loss of the Emirate, most of Ansar al-Islam gathered at the Iran–Iraq border, where they were smuggled into Iran by Iranian Kurds. The KDP and PUK disagreed on how to fight Ansar al-Islam, and some KDP officials even refused to intervene, claiming that the PUK had to face the consequences of allowing Ansar al-Islam to gain such power. The United States also pressured the Peshmerga into disbanding its IMK-Peshmerga branch in 2003.

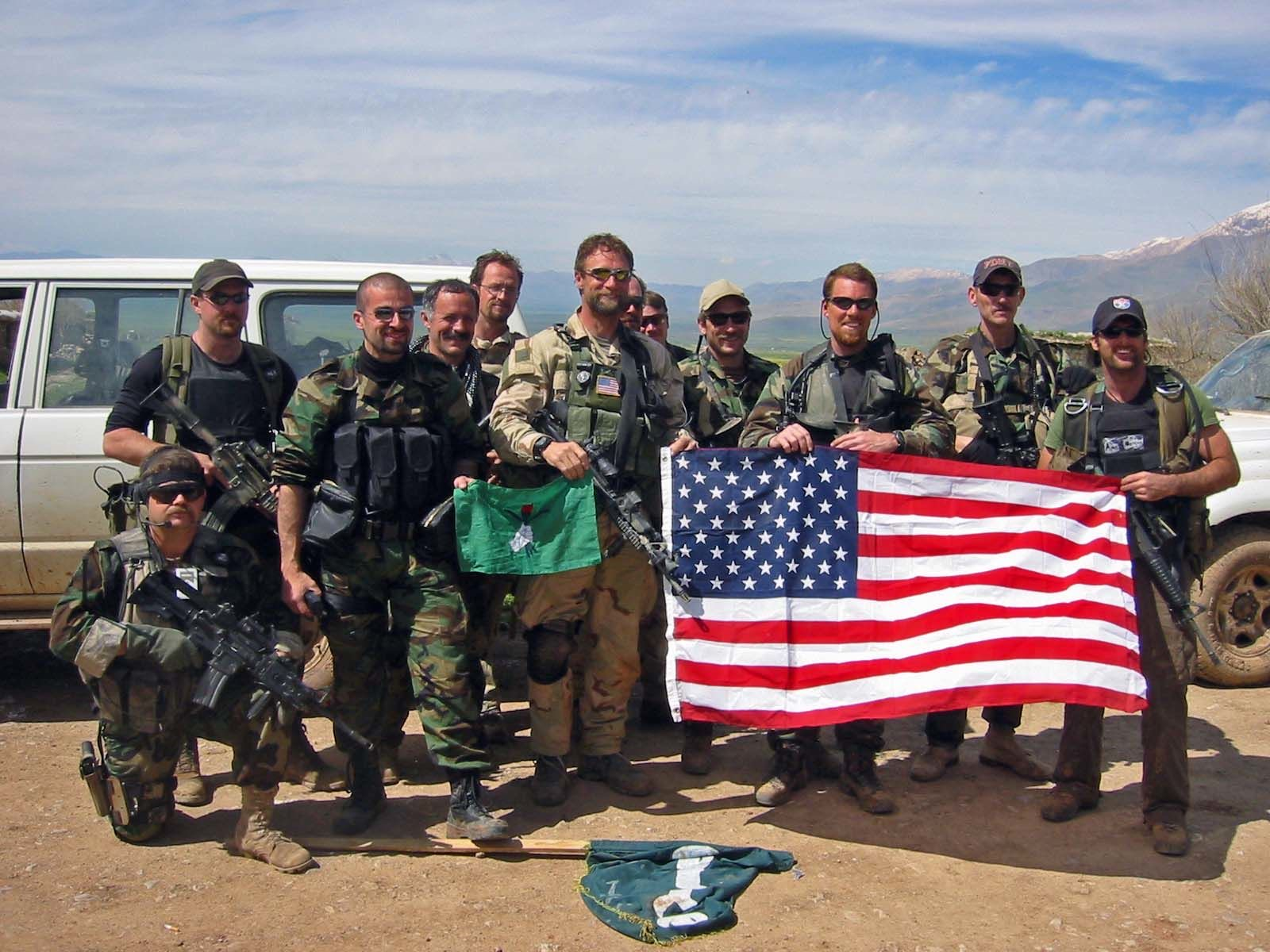
US Special Forces and PUK Peshmerga after defeating Ansar al-Islam

After the collapse of the emirate, Ansar al-Islam dissolved. Abu Abdullah al-Shafi'i escaped the Kurdistan Region and founded Jamaat Ansar al-Sunna and fought in the Iraqi insurgency, while Mullah Krekar left for Norway and founded Rawti Shax before his arrest in 2015. Ali Bapir reconciled with the Kurdistan Regional Government, and registered his group as a legal political party.

Mullah Krekar questioned the nationalism of the PUK, claiming that no Kurdish nationalist would invite the United States to defeat the only Kurdish state. Mullah Krekar also refused to join the Iraqi insurgency, since many Iraqi jihadists were former Ba'athist officers.

In late 2016, around the 15th anniversary of the emirate, Mullah Krekar said that "I hope we separate from Iraq as soon as possible. I would support it wholeheartedly. We were annexed to the Iraqi state under force in 1921, a state that is a failed state in every sense. The first time Iraq purchased aircraft, they bombed the Kingdom of Kurdistan and Sulaymaniyah. If a tiny part of Kurdistan is separated from Iraq and declares independence, I will endorse it fully. When Mauritania declared independence, they didn't even have a building to wave their flag upon, but still they declared independence." He also claimed that he no longer held resentment towards Kurdish government officials. Hoshyar Zebari confirmed that the Kurdish government made peace with Krekar.

== See also ==
- Ittihadul Ulema (Union of Islamic Scholars and Schools)
- Kurdistan independence movement
  - Kurdish separatism in Iran (1918–present)
    - Iran–PJAK conflict (2004–present)
  - Kurdish–Iraqi conflict (1918–present)
  - Kurdish–Syrian conflict (2012–present)
  - Kurdish–Turkish conflict (1921–present)
    - Human rights of Kurdish people in Turkey
    - Imprisonment of Abdullah Öcalan (1999–present)
    - Kurdistan Workers' Party insurgency (1978–2025)
    - Timeline of Kurdish uprisings
- List of Kurdish dynasties and countries
- Shia Islamism

=== Kurdish Islamism ===
- Great Eastern Islamic Raiders' Front (İBDA-C)
  - Salih Mirzabeyoğlu
  - State of Grandsublime
- Kurdish emirates
- Kurdish Hezbollah of Iran
- Kurdish Hezbollah of Turkey
- Kurdistan Islamic Movement (Turkey)

=== Other Islamist proto-states ===
- Islamic Emirate of Afghanistan (1996–2001) and Islamic Emirate of Afghanistan (2021–present)
- Islamic Emirate of Kunar (1989–1991)
- Islamic Emirate of Rafah (2009)
- Islamic Wilayat of Somalia (2008–present)
- Islamic Emirate of Yemen (2015–2020)
