= Operation Viking Hammer =

Military operation during the Iraq War

Coordinates: 35.1833°N 45.9833°E

- Part of Iraqi Kurdistan conflict (2001–2003) and 2003 invasion of Iraq
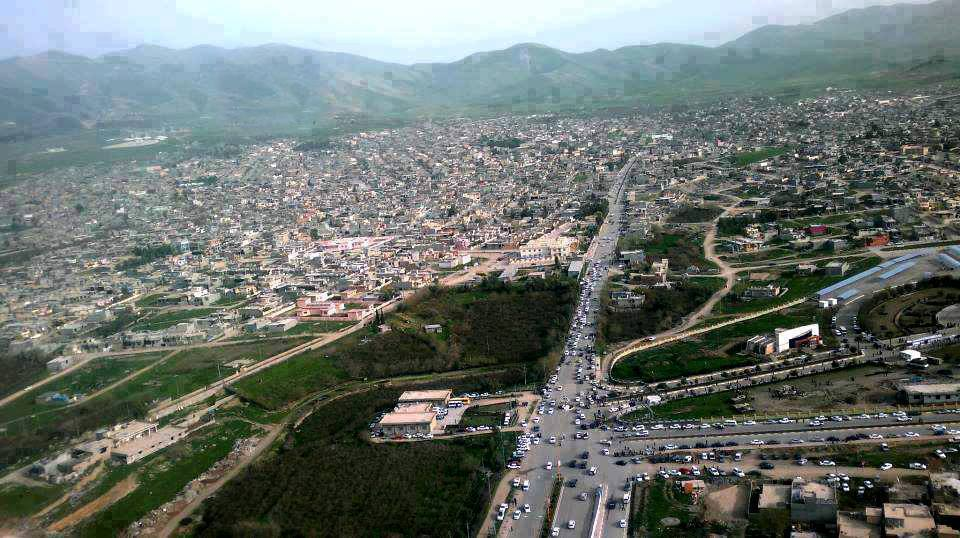
- Halabja city
Date	March 28–30, 2003
Location	Around Halabja, Iraq
Result	PUK Peshmerga-American victory
Territorial changes	Dissolution of the Islamic Emirate of Kurdistan

Belligerents
United States; Peshmerga: PUK	Islamic Emirate of Kurdistan; Supported by: Iran (alleged by Peshmerga)

Commanders and leaders
Kenneth E. Tovo; Jalal Talabani	Abu Abdullah al-Shafi'i; Ali Bapir

Units involved
US Army Special Forces; CIA SAD; CTG	Ansar al-Islam; Kurdistan Islamic Group

Strength
70 Americans (60 U.S. Army Special Forces members and 10 CIA SAD agents); 7,000 Peshmerga	600–800 fighters

Casualties and losses
3 killed, 23 wounded	150–200 killed, remainder captured or fled to Iran; 100 killed

Operation Viking Hammer was an unconventional warfare operation during the Iraq War which took place in northern Iraq, commonly known as Iraqi Kurdistan. The goal of the operation was to eliminate Ansar al-Islam and dismantle the Islamic Emirate of Kurdistan. Ansar al-Islam was established by former Al-Qaeda members in 2001 as a Kurdish Salafist movement that imposed a strict application of Sharia in villages it controlled.

== Background ==
Ansar al-Islam made its first appearance in Iraqi Kurdistan in December 2001. The group was founded by Mullah Krekar and made up of mostly Kurdish veterans of Jihad coming back from Afghanistan following the end of the Soviet–Afghan War. From 2001 to 2003, they fought against US-backed Peshmerga in northern Iraq, and carved out the Islamic Emirate of Kurdistan around the border town of Halabja. The CIA also suspected Ansar al-Islam of manufacturing chemical weapons and the poison Ricin in a factory in the town of Sargat. In addition, at least two other militant Kurdish Islamic groups, the Kurdistan Islamic Movement and Kurdistan Justice Group (which later rekindled with the Kurdistan Regional Government) were operating in the region, and these generally aligned themselves with Ansar al-Islam.

After Turkey had denied the U.S. 4th Infantry Division passage through their borders, the burden of carrying out the northern front of the war in Iraq fell on an ad hoc coalition of Americans to include CIA Special Activities Division (SAD) paramilitary operations officers, Special Forces soldiers from 10th SFG, U.S. Army 10th Mountain Division, 2nd Battalion, 14th Infantry Regiment and airborne units that parachuted into northern Iraq (however, the 173rd and 10th Mountain played no part in Operation Viking Hammer), and Kurdish Peshmerga forces of the Patriotic Union of Kurdistan and Kurdish Democratic Party. The American forces were designated the Northern Iraq Liaison Element. Before beginning the attack south, the coalition forces first needed to destroy Ansar al-Islam's enclave in order to secure the Kurdish rear areas and free Kurdish forces to take part in the advance southwards.

== Battle ==
Ansar al-Islam fighters held a series of mountaintop positions that offered them an advantage and a commanding view of the surrounding areas, but also left them vulnerable to airstrikes. Cruise missile strikes against Ansar al-Islam camp and surrounding positions were launched in the early hours of March 21, a total of 64 Tomahawk cruise missiles were fired as a preparatory barrage. The Americans originally planned to launch a ground attack immediately following the airstrikes, but most American forces were not in place. Once more American troops arrived, the date of the attack was set for March 28. The plan called for four lines of advance for the Peshmerga, with each force accompanied by U.S. Special Forces and CIA paramilitary officers. On the day before the battle, the Kurdistan Islamic Group, led by Ali Bapir, which had been allied with Ansar al-Islam, surrendered after having around 100 of their men killed in the March 21 strikes and being unable to move forward. The ground attack consisted of a six-pronged advance, with each prong was composed of several ODAs from 3rd battalion, 10th SFG and upwards of 1,000 Peshmerga.

The attack from the south on the morning of the 28th was met with heavy fire from the Ansar defenders. Airstrikes were called in and the defenders routed. The Peshmerga and U.S. advisors pursued them and captured the town of Gulp hours ahead of schedule. The majority of the Ansar fighters retreated to the town of Sargat where they made their final stand. Advancing on Sargat, the Peshmerga and Americans were pinned down for three hours by mortar and machine gunfire. Unable to call in airstrikes or contact friendly forces due to the deep valley blocking radio signals, the Special Forces soldiers used a Barrett M82 .50 caliber anti-material sniper rifle to take out Ansar al-Islam machine gun crews while the Peshmerga brought up artillery. The combination of artillery support and accurate long-range sniper fire drove the Ansar al-Islam forces from the town. Pursuing Ansar fighters into the hills, American and Peshmerga forces were again pinned down by machine-gun fire and had to call in more airstrikes before darkness put an end to the day's fighting.

During the night, four AC-130 gunships maintained the pressure on the retreating Ansar al-Islam militants as they pulled back toward the Iranian border. The next day, the Americans and Peshmerga pursued the Ansar al-Islam forces further into the mountains, towards the Iranian border. Many fighters attempted to flee across the border, only to be arrested by the Iranians. Many were sent back across the border and were later captured by Kurdish forces. However, Kurdish sources allege that Iran in fact harbored many Ansar al-Islam fighters.

== Aftermath ==
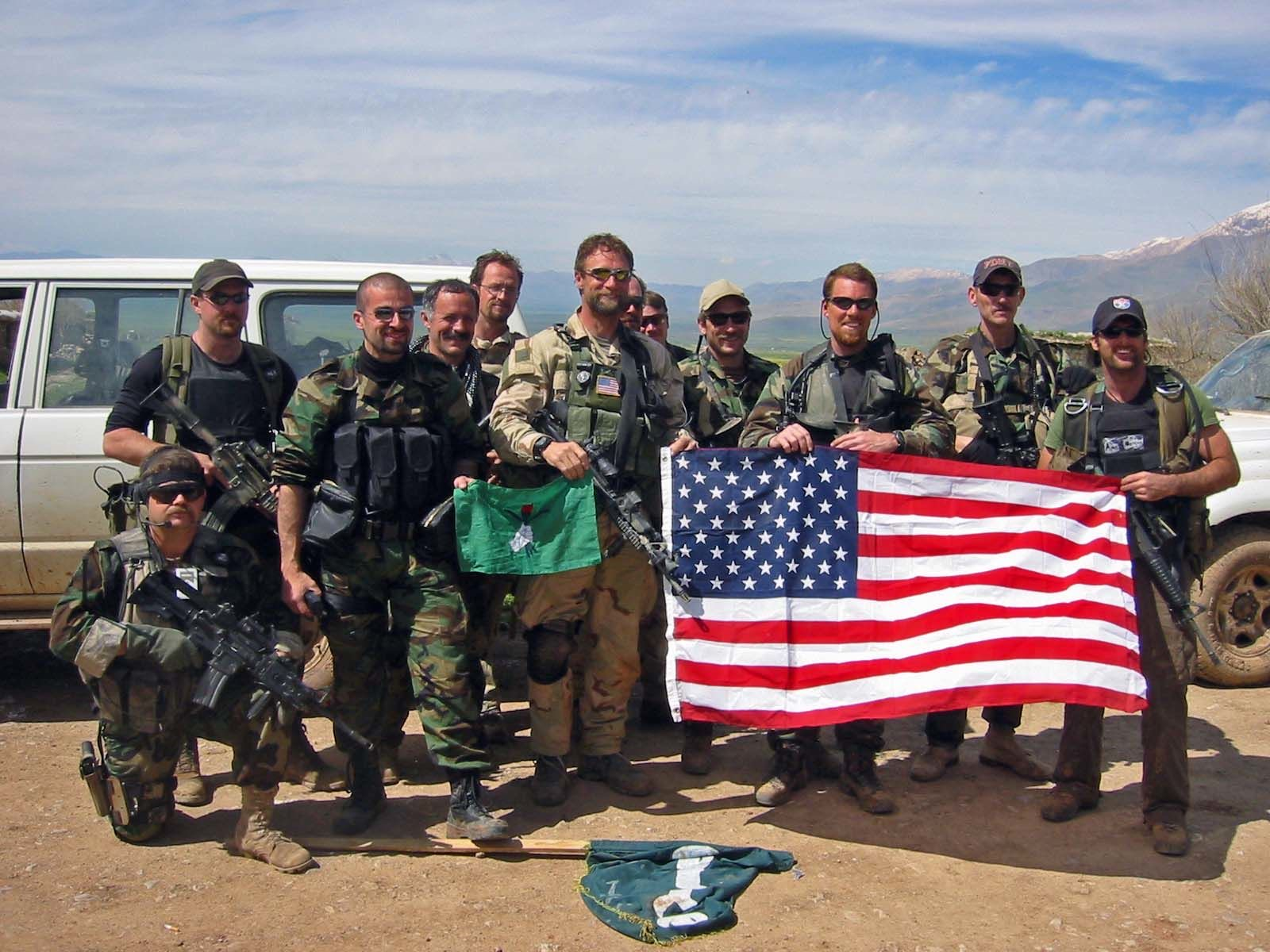
CTG, CIA, Special Forces

Operation Viking Hammer had eliminated Ansar al-Islam's presence in northern Iraq, and allowed Kurdish units to join the fight against Iraqi troops in northern Iraq. American intelligence personnel inspected the suspected chemical weapons site in Sargat and discovered traces of Ricin in the ruins, as well as potassium chloride. They also discovered chemical weapon suits, atropine nerve gas antidotes, and manuals on manufacturing chemical weapons, lending credence to the idea that the site was related to the manufacture of chemical weapons and poisons.

In a 2004 U.S. News & World Report article, "A firefight in the mountains", the author states:

"Viking Hammer would go down in the annals of Special Forces history—a battle fought on foot, under sustained fire from an enemy lodged in the mountains, and with minimal artillery and air support."

Seven U.S. Army Special Forces soldiers were awarded the Silver Star for their actions around Sargat and 52 soldiers received the Bronze Stars with valor. Four members of the SAD paramilitary team received CIA's rare Intelligence Star for "extraordinary heroism" in combat.
