= Jamaat Ansar al-Sunna =

Iraqi Sunni insurgent group

Jamaat Ansar al-Sunnah جماعة أنصار السنة
- Leaders: Abu Abdullah al-Shafi'i; Abu Wayil
- Dates active: September 2003 – December 2007 (Subsequently operated under name of Ansar al-Ahlu Sunnah)
- Active regions: Iraq (2003-2011)
- Ideology: Sunni Islamism
- Size: 1,000+
- Wars: Iraq War, Iraqi insurgency

Jamaat Ansar al-Sunnah (Arabic: جماعة أنصار السنه, romanized: Jama'at 'Anṣār as-Sunnah, lit. 'Assembly of the Helpers of Sunnah'), also known as Jaish Ansar al-Sunna ('Army of the Helpers of Sunnah'), Ali ibn Abi Talib Battalion or simply as Ansar al-Sunnah was an Iraqi Sunni insurgent group that fought against United States troops and their local allies during the Iraq War. The group was primarily based in northern and central Iraq, and included mainly Iraqi (mostly Arab but also Kurdish) fighters. In 2007, it split into Jama'at Ansar al-Islam and Ansar al-Sunnah Shariah Committee, which changed its name to Ansar al-Ahlu Sunnah in 2011.

The group has been a Proscribed Organisation in the United Kingdom under the Terrorism Act 2000 since 14 October 2005.

== History ==
The group was founded in September 2003, as an umbrella organization for guerrillas, with former members of Ansar al-Islam who had fled to Iran after a 2003 joint operation by Iraqi and US forces. Their goal was to expel U.S. occupation forces from Iraq.

Following the twin Sunni and Shiite uprisings of the spring and summer of 2004, and the subsequent decrease in U.S patrols and the creation of "no-go" areas in the Sunni Triangle, Ansar al-Sunna was believed to be part of a loose coalition of insurgent groups (also including guerrillas from al-Tawhid wal Jihad) controlling the Sunni cities of Fallujah, Ramadi, Samarra, and Baquba (U.S. offensives later largely wrested control from Baquba, Fallujah, and Samarra, although underground guerrilla resistance forces still had a strong presence in those cities).

The United States and Iraqi Interim governments linked Ansar al-Sunna with Abu Musab al-Zarqawi's, Jama'at al-Tawhid wal-Jihad (al-Qaeda in Iraq). In October 2004 Ansar al-Sunna released a video beheading of a Turkish truck driver on its website. The kidnappers on the video identified themselves as members of al-Tawhid wal Jihad (Source: MERIA). However a letter intercepted by the American military in January 2007 revealed the two groups had begun feuding.

In July 2007 representatives of the Jaish Ansar al-Sunna were instrumental in forming an alliance of Sunni militant groups to prepare for the withdrawal of American and allied forces. The new alliance was composed of seven groupings explicitly excluding al-Qaeda and the Baath-party. This delimitation revealed a split between al-Qaeda and Ansar al-Sunna over tactics, alleged attacks on Iraqi Shia civilians being a main point of difference.

In December 2007, the leader of the Ansar al-Sunnah, Abu Abdullah al-Shafi, issued a communique acknowledging that the group was simply another name for Ansar al-Islam. The communique went on to state that from that point on, they would return to operating under the name of Ansar al-Islam.

A small group still using the name "Jamaat Ansar al-Sunna" has been active in the surge of militant activity in 2014.

== Suicide bombings ==
Jaish Ansar al-Sunna claimed responsibility for several suicide bombings in Iraq, including the devastating attacks on the offices of two main Kurdish political parties, KDP and PUK, in Irbil on February 1, 2004, that killed at least 109 people. The strikes were one of the bloodiest attacks launched by insurgents since the start of the war.

It produced tapes and CDs that marked the "last testaments" of six bombers from previous attacks, three of whom appeared non-Iraqi. Its name also appeared with eleven other insurgent groups on leaflets passed out in the Sunni Triangle cities of Ramadi and Fallujah from January 31, 2004 to February 1, 2004. The leaflets detailed the insurgency's plan for seizing Iraqi cities following the departure of coalition forces.

It also had a strong presence in Mosul where it launched an offensive in November 2004 along with other foreign fighters and militant groups. After the Battle of Mosul (2004) the group maintained pockets of resistance in the western part of the city. It continued to clash with units such as the 1st Battalion, 25th Infantry Regiment and it claimed responsibility for a major suicide bombing of the dining hall at the US base in Mosul on December 21, 2004 that killed 22 people, including 14 American soldiers. The attacker was reportedly a suicide bomber wearing an explosive vest under the uniform of an Iraqi security officer. The suicide bomber's name was Abu Museli.

== See also ==
- List of armed groups in the Iraqi Civil War
- Ansar al-Islam
- Iraqi insurgency
