= Franso Hariri =

Assyrian KDP member assassinated by Ansar al-Islam (1937–2001)

Franso Toma Hariri
- ܦܪܢܣܘ ܚܪܝܪܝ
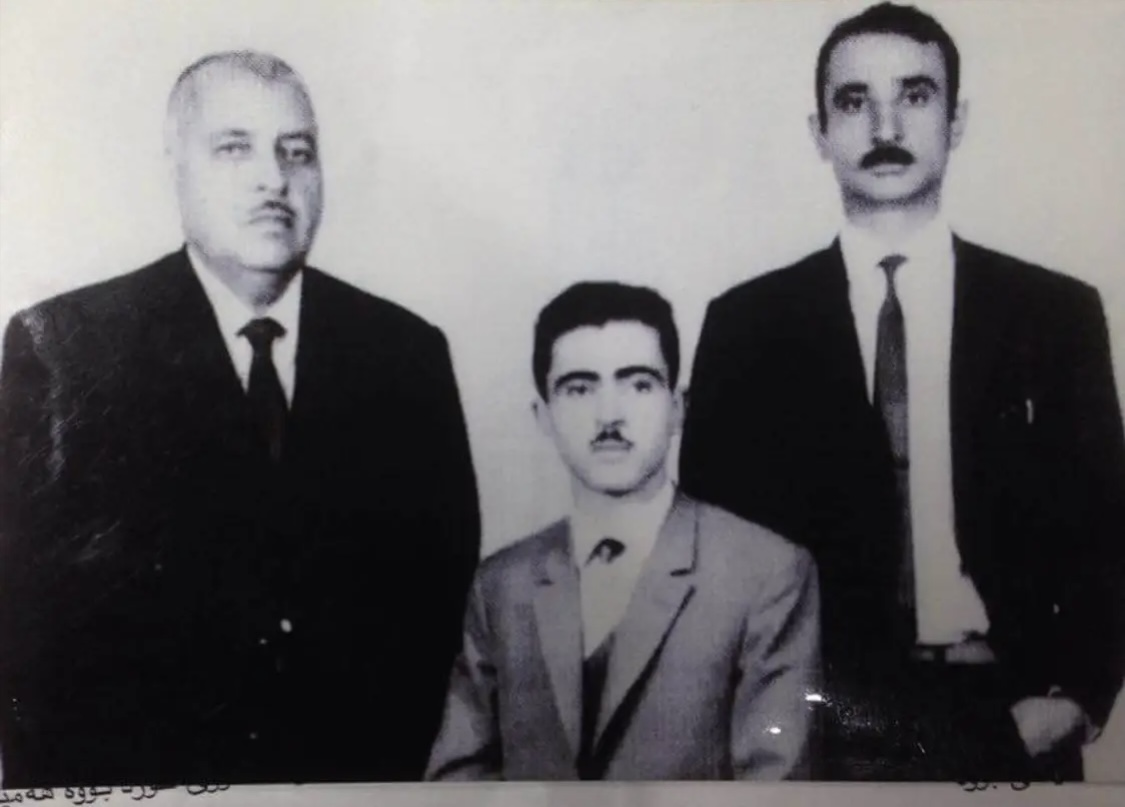
- Franso Hariri (right), Idris Barzani in the middle, and Kaka Ziad Koya to the left.
- Born: 1937; Harir, Iraq
- Died: February 18, 2001 (aged 63–64)
- Cause of death: Assassination by Ansar al-Islam
- Monuments: Franso Hariri Stadium
- Education: Erbil Teaching Institution
- Occupation: Politician
- Years active: 1960s–2001
- Employer: Kurdistan Democratic Party
- Organization: Kurdistan Democratic Party
- Known for: Member of the Kurdistan Democratic Party, head of KDP block in Kurdistan Region Parliament
- Title: Governor of Erbil
- Political party: Kurdistan Democratic Party
- Opponent: Ansar al-Islam
- Children: Fawzi Hariri
- Family: Nochiya Tribe

Franso Toma Hariri (Syriac: ܦܪܢܣܘ ܚܪܝܪܝ, Kurdish: فەڕەنسۆ هەریری; 1937 – February 18, 2001), was an Iraqi Assyrian politician, and a high-ranking and long-standing Kurdistan Democratic Party member and head of the KDP block of the Kurdistan Region Parliament.

== Personal life ==
Franso Hariri was born in the city of Harir (70 km from Erbil) in 1937, and graduated from the Erbil Teaching Institution in 1960. He worked for the Kurdistan Democratic Party in the early 1960s and was a close friend of the late Kurdish leader Mustafa Barzani. Franso held important positions in the KDP during the Kurdish Revolution. He was elected a member of the KDP Central Committee in 1979 and was the head of the KDP delegation in the Kurdistan regional parliament, the governor of Erbil, and a minister in the third Kurdistan Regional Government in Erbil.

He supported projects for the beautification and modernization of the city of Erbil. He was also well known as a strong supporter of education, health, and sport projects in the city.

His son Fawzi Hariri was a former Minister of Industry of Iraq.

== Death ==
Hariri was assassinated on his way to work on February 18, 2001 by four Kurdish Ansar al-Islam members. Two previous attempts had been made on his life in Erbil on 1994 and 1997 at the same place and the same street but he escaped from both.

In honor of Hariri, the Kurdistan Regional Government declared three days of mourning and renamed the Erbil football stadium the Franso Hariri Stadium.

== See also ==
- Franso Hariri Stadium
- List of ethnic Assyrians
- List of Nochiyaye
- Nochiya Tribe
