= Abu Abdullah al-Shafi'i =

Iraqi islamist militant

Wirya Rasoul Salih Hawleri
- ورێیا ڕەسووڵ ساڵح هەولێری
- Born: Zakho, Iraqi Kurdistan
- Other name: Abu Abdullah al-Shafi'i
- Children: Abdullah (son)
- Military career
- Allegiance: Ansar al-Islam; Jamaat Ansar al-Sunna
- Known for: Leader of Ansar al-Islam and Jamaat Ansar al-Sunna, Kurdish jihadist veteran. In 2010, he was arrested and imprisoned in Abu Ghraib prison.
- Conflicts: War on terror; War in Afghanistan (2001–2021); Iraq War; Iraqi insurgency (2003–2011); Iraqi conflict; Chechen–Russian conflict; Insurgency in the North Caucasus

Wirya Rasoul Salih Hawleri (Kurdish: وریا ڕەسووڵ ساڵح هەولێری), known as Abu Abdullah al-Shafi'i (Arabic: ابو عبدالله الشافعي; Father of Abdullah, the Shafi'i), is the former leader of Ansar al-Islam, Jamaat Ansar al-Sunna, and Jama'at Ansar al-Islam. Born in Zakho, Iraqi Kurdistan, he is a Kurdish veteran of jihad in Afghanistan and Chechnya. On 3 May 2010, he was captured by the Iraqi government along with seven others.
