= Ansar al-Islam in Kurdistan =

Kurdish Islamist militant group

- ئەنسارولئیسلام لە کوردستان
- Flag used by Ansar al-Islam
- Founders: Abu Abdullah al-Shafi'i, Mullah Krekar
- Leader: Mullah Krekar
- Founded: December 10, 2001
- Dates active: 2001-2003
- Dissolved: March 30, 2003
- Allegiance: Islamic Emirate of Kurdistan
- Active regions: Iraqi Kurdistan
- Ideology: Kurdish-Islamic nationalism Sunni Islamism; Salafi jihadism Anti-KDP; Anti-PUK

Ansar al-Islam in Kurdistan (Kurdish: ئەنسارولئیسلام له کوردستان; the Supporters of Islam in Kurdistan), better known as Ansar al-Islam (Kurdish: ئەنسارولئیسلام; AAI), was a Kurdish Sunni Islamist and separatist militant group. It was established in the Islamic Emirate of Kurdistan in 2001 by Mullah Krekar. Its motive was to incorporate all of Kurdistan into an Islamic state, and the protection of Kurds. The group dissolved in 2003 after Operation Viking Hammer. The group was a designated terrorist organization in the United Nations, Australia, Canada, Israel, the United Kingdom, and the United States, and a known affiliate of al-Qaeda. The group had no connection to Jama'at Ansar al-Islam, another Salafi jihadist group that emerged in 2007, and was modeled after Ansar al-Islam.

== Name ==
Their official name was "Ansar al-Islam in Kurdistan", meaning "Supporters of Islam in Kurdistan", but they were called "Ansar al-Islam" for short.

The group received the nickname "Kurdish Taliban" because it was made up of Kurds who fought for the Taliban in Afghanistan, and for their similarity with the Taliban, including how both of them established Islamic Emirates under Sharia, both of their fighters were Islamist but had some nationalism (Taliban with Pashtun, Ansar with Kurdish), and both of them harshly persecuted non-Muslims.

== History ==
=== Formation ===
Ansar al-Islam was formed in September 2001 in the Islamic Emirate of Kurdistan. It was a merger of Jund al-Islam, led by Abu Abdullah al-Shafi'i, and Islah, led by Mullah Krekar. Ansar al-Islam was led by Mullah Krekar, and seized the Islamic Emirate of Kurdistan from the Kurdistan Islamic Movement after it made an agreement with the Patriotic Union of Kurdistan and joined Kurdistan Regional Government. The group later made allegiance to al-Qaeda, and allegedly received direct funds from al-Qaeda.

In 2002, Ansar al-Islam had over 700 fighters at its peak. Over 90% of its militants were Kurds.

Iran was accused of giving logistical support to the group in the Islamic Emirate of Kurdistan near the Iranian border. Upon its founding, Ansar al-Islam declared a war on all secular political parties in Iraqi Kurdistan. Throughout 2002, the group carried out attacks against the KRG and particularly assassinated high-level politicians, as well as engaging in battles and skirmishes. Ansar al-Islam mainly opposed the PUK. In the Islamic Emirate of Kurdistan, Ansar al-Islam implemented Sharia. They also restricted women's rights, and targeted the Yarsani religious group as well as Sufis.

In late 2001 and early 2002, the group took advantage of some foreign jihadist volunteers fleeing Afghanistan following the 2001 invasion of Afghanistan. One of the foreign jihadists was Abu Musab al-Zarqawi, who briefly stayed with them before leaving.

Prior to the 2003 invasion of Iraq, paramilitary teams from the Special Activities Division (SAD) and the Army's 10th Special Forces Group entered Iraq and cooperated with the PUK to attack Ansar al-Islam. They launched Operation Viking Hammer in March 2003, and the PUK retook the lands of the Islamic Emirate of Kurdistan. Ansar al-Islam disbanded after the battle. Colin Powell claimed that there was a chemical weapons factory hidden in another location, and about fifteen reporters visited the location, but saw nothing except a studio which Ansar al-Islam planned to turn to a TV and radio station. They claimed that the studio was going to be used to make Ansar al-Islam propaganda.

=== Reported re-emergence in Iraq ===
After the defeat of ISIL and the recapture of Tuz Khurmatu by Turkmen and Shiite Popular Mobilization Forces during the 2017 Iraqi–Kurdish conflict, the town and its surroundings came under almost daily rocket attacks by a militant faction that used a white flag with the blackhead of a lion. These "White Flags", led by Assi al-Qawali, reportedly consisted of Kurdish Islamist militants, ex-ISIL fighters, and Kurdistan Democratic Party supporters who claimed to be fighting to "liberate the Kurdish lands occupied by the Iran-backed Shia militias". Iraqi security and intelligence officials said that intelligence reports made it likely that this new group was a front organization of Ansar al-Islam, which reportedly still had hundreds of fighters operating in the Hamrin Mountains. Kurds generally believed the Iraqi government had fabricated the group, or at least heavily exaggerated its significance.

== Alleged ties to Saddam Hussein's regime ==
In a "Special Analysis" report from 31 July 2002, the U.S. Defense Intelligence Agency accused Ansar al-Islam of being connected to Saddam Hussein, stating that "the Iraqi regime seeks to influence and manipulate political events in the Kurdish-controlled north and probably has some type of assets in contact with Ansar al-Islam, either through liaison or through penetration by an intelligence asset." In January 2003, the U.S. claimed that Ansar al-Islam was a possible mediator between Saddam Hussein and al-Qaeda, and claimed to have prepared evidence of it. Ansar al-Islam's leader, Mullah Krekar, in January 2003, denied all allegations of links of Ansar al-Islam with Saddam Hussein's government. Rohan Gunaratna, who specialized in global security, in January 2003, had agreed with Mullah Krekar, stating that there was no proof of links between Ansar al-Islam and Saddam Hussein. Mullah Krekar himself was a veteran of the 1991 Iraqi uprisings and claimed that if Iraq had done anything against the Islamic Emirate of Kurdistan, he would have personally killed Saddam Hussein. He refused to fight in the Iraqi insurgency, since many Iraqi jihadists were former Ba'athist officers.

In February 2003, Colin Powell, told the United Nations Security Council that "Baghdad has an agent in the most senior levels of the radical organization, Ansar al-Islam, that controls this corner of Iraq. In 2000, this agent offered al-Qaeda a safe haven in the region. After we swept al-Qaeda from Afghanistan, some of its members accepted this safe haven." In January 2004, Colin Powell claimed that he had no proof of the alleged ties between Ansar al-Islam and Saddam Hussein. He stated that "I have not seen smoking gun, concrete evidence about the connection, but I do believe the connections existed."

The Senate Report on Iraqi WMD Intelligence, issued in 2004, concluded that Saddam Hussein was aware of the presence of Ansar al-Islam in Iraqi Kurdistan, and that he considered the group a threat to his regime, and had attempted to gather intelligence against them. The Defense Intelligence Agency stated that senior Ansar al-Islam detainees denied any relationship with Saddam Hussein, claiming that he was an apostate. The U.S. Select Committee on Intelligence in September 2006 confirmed that "Post-war information reveals that Iraq viewed Ansar al-Islam as a threat to the regime and attempted to collect intelligence on the group".

After Powell had left office, in an interview, he told Barbara Walters that his allegations of ties between Saddam Hussein and Ansar al-Islam were false and had tarnished his reputation. He stated that "there were some people in the intelligence community who knew at that time that some of these sources were not good and shouldn't be relied upon, and they didn't speak up. That devastated me."

== Swedish fund-raising case ==
Ali Berzengi and Ferman Abdullah, from Iraqi Kurdistan residing in Stockholm, raised money for what they claimed was poor children and Muslims. The money was then transferred through Abdullah's food stand, using the hawala transfer system. The Swedish Security Service was informed in 2002 that people in Sweden had transferred money to Ansar al-Islam. On 19 April 2004, Berzengi and Abdullah were arrested along with Shaho Shahab, from Iraqi Kurdistan, and Bilal Ramadan, born in Lebanon. Ramadan was released in September after a court found that there was not enough incriminating evidence. Shahab was released in December after the government decided to deport him to Iraq. However, since Shahab risked the death penalty in Iraq, the deportation was not carried out. In Abdullah's apartment, the police found a letter from a man who claimed to have contact with Abu Musab al-Zarqawi, the leader of al-Qaeda in Iraq, as well as a detailed lesson on coded language.

On 12 May 2005, Abdullah and Berzengi were convicted of "planning of terrorist offences" (Swedish: förberedelse till terroristbrott) and "planning of public devastation" (Swedish: förberedelse till allmänfarlig ödeläggelse) by the Stockholm District Court. The Stockholm District Court said that Abdullah and Berzengi had transferred approximately one million SEK to Ansar al-Islam. According to the court there was strong evidence that the collected money had the specific purpose of financing terrorist attacks. Much of the evidence presented consisted of secret wire-tappings from U.S. and German intelligence sources. In the recordings, Abdullah and Berzengi used coded language to describe the attacks. Berzengi, who according to the court, was the mastermind, was sentenced to seven years of imprisonment, and Abdullah was sentenced to six years. The Svea Court of Appeal later reduced the sentences to five years for Berzengi, and four and a half years for Abdullah. The appeal to the Supreme Court was denied. They both are to be deported to Iraq after serving their sentences in Sweden. Abdullah is currently serving his sentence at the Norrköping Prison.

Berzengi and Abdullah's conviction was the first conviction since the new Swedish terrorism legislation was taken into effect on 1 July 2003. It was also the first ever conviction in Western Europe of people financing terrorism.

== Links to al-Qaeda ==
One of Ansar al-Islam's leaders, Abu Abdullah al-Shafi'i, was trained by al-Qaeda during his stay in Afghanistan. Another early leading figure of Ansar al-Islam, Abu Abd al-Rahman, who was killed in October 2001, was convicted by the U.S. of ties to al-Qaeda. In a report dated 31 July 2002, the U.S. Defense Intelligence Agency concluded that "Ansar al-Islam is an independent organization that receives assistance from al-Qaeda, but is not a branch of the group."

In early 2003, less than 10 percent of individuals in Ansar al-Islam were both Taliban and al-Qaeda members. This, and the information about Shafi'i and Abd al-Rahman, led Colin Powell in January 2003 to claim that ties between Ansar al-Islam and al-Qaeda exist, and that the U.S. was preparing to unveil new evidence of it.

Rohan Gunaratna stated that "Ansar al-Islam has links with al-Qaeda. In fact, it is an associate group of al-Qaeda". Mullah Krekar in January 2003 denied having links with al-Qaeda. In March–April 2003, Mullah Krekar again protested against such links, and said to newspaper Al-Hayat that he had ties with the United States government prior to the September 11 attacks, and that he had "irrefutable evidence against the Americans", which he was "prepared to release it" if the United States continued accusing him of being "linked to terrorism".

== Designation as a terrorist organization ==
Country	Date	References
Australia	March 2003	
Canada	17 May 2004	
Israel	2005	
United Kingdom	14 October 2005	
United States	22 March 2004	
United Arab Emirates	16 November 2014	
Iraq		
Japan		
Bahrain		

== Leadership ==
Ansar al-Islam's first leader was Abu Abdullah al-Shafi'i, until shortly after 11 September 2001. Mullah Krekar in 2001 replaced Shafi'i as leader of Ansar al-Islam, and Shafi'i became his deputy.

== Claimed and alleged attacks ==
On 18 February 2001, four Kurdish Ansar al-Islam members assassinated Franso Hariri while he was on his way to work. Two previous attempts had been made on his life in Erbil in 1994 and 1997 at the same place and the same street, but he escaped from both.

On 22 March 2003, Ansar al-Islam detonated a car bomb, killing Australian journalist Paul Moran and several others. The group was also accused of the attempted bombing of a United States Department of Defense office in Erbil, on 9 September 2003, which killed three people.

Another attack was the stabbing of a police officer in Berlin on 17 September 2015, by Ansar al-Islam veteran Rafik Yousef, who previously attempted to assassinate Ayad Allawi.

== See also ==
- Kurdistan Islamic Movement
- Kurdistan Islamic Union
- Kurdistan Justice Group
- Jamaat Ansar al-Sunna
- Second Soran Unit
