= Halabja (disambiguation) =

Halabja is a city in the Kurdistan Region of Iraq.

Halabja may also refer to:

- Halabja massacre, 1988 chemical attack done by Ba’athist Iraq
- Halabjay Taza, a town in Kurdistan Region, Iraq
- Halabja Governorate, a governorate in Kurdistan Region, Iraq
- Halabja District, a former district in Sulaymaniyah Governorate
- Halabja Martyrs Monument, a monument honoring the victims of the Halabja massacre
