= Halabja District =

Halabja District may refer to:

- Halabja, a district of the Halabja Governorate
- Halabja District, Sulaymaniyah Governorate, a former district

== See also ==
- Halabja Governorate
