= Nuxsha Nasih =

Iraqi Kurdish politician

- نوخشە ناسح ئەحمەد
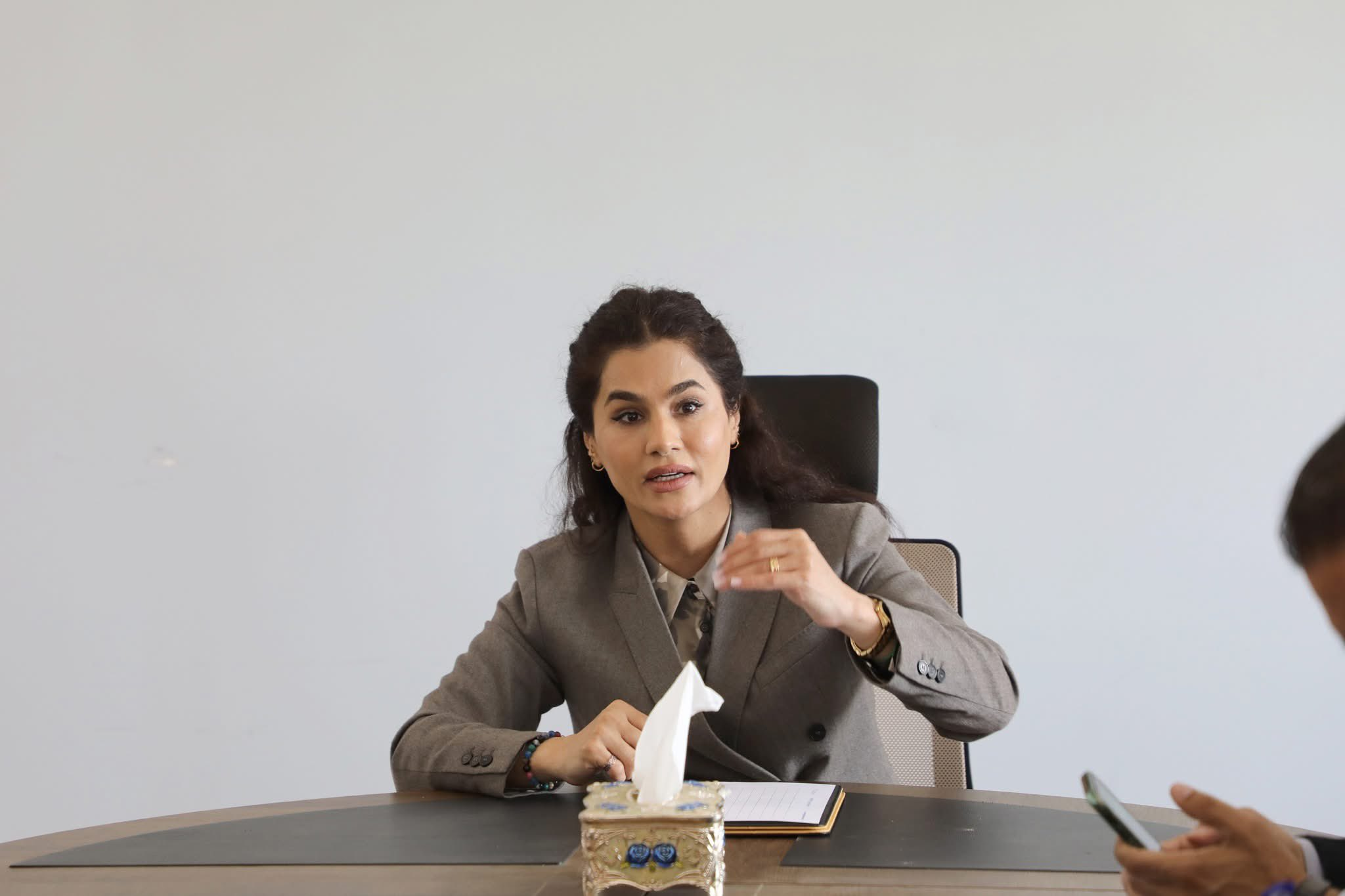
- Nuxsha Nasih in 2025, during the third day of the eighth session of the Provincial Council, discussing the mechanisms and methods of operation of the managements.

Acting Governor of Halabja
- Incumbent
- Assumed office March 20 2025
- President: Nechirvan Barzani
- Prime Minister: Masrour Barzani
- Preceded by: Azad Tofiq

Mayor (Qaimaqam) of Halabja
- In office March 27 2016 – March 2025
- President: Nechirvan Barzani
- Prime Minister: Masrour Barzani
- Preceded by: Goran Adham
- Succeeded by: Simko Salar

Personal details
- Born: 1978 Halabja, Iraqi Republic
- Citizenship: Iraq
- Party: Patriotic union of kurdistan
- Children: 2 daughters
- Occupation: Lawyer, politician
- Profession: Lawyer

Nuxsha Nasih Ahmed (also spelled Nukhsha in English; (Sorani Kurdish: نوخشە ناسح ئەحمەد) [ˈnʊxʃæ ˈnɑːsɪħ ˈæħmæd]; referred to as Nuxshe Nasih or Nuxshe Naseh, born 1978) is an Iraqi Kurdish politician who serves as the Acting Governor of Halabja since 2025. She previously served as Mayor of Halabja in Iraqi Kurdistan from 2016. She is the second woman to be appointed to the most prominent political office in Halabja after Lady Adela and the first woman to serve as governor in Iraq's history, following the elevation of Halabja to governorate status in 2025.

== Early life and education ==
Nuxsha Nasih was born in 1978 in Halabja, Iraqi Kurdistan, during the Ba'athist Iraq period. She received a law degree and trained as a lawyer before entering politics.

== Political career ==
=== Early positions ===
Prior to her appointment as Mayor, Nasih served as director of the Biyara sub-district on the border with Iran from 2008 to 2015. In this role, she gained experience in cross-border relations and administrative governance.

=== Mayor of Halabja ===
Nasih was appointed Mayor of Halabja on 27 March 2016 following the victory of the Patriotic Union of Kurdistan (PUK) in the 2014 local elections. The Kurdish news service Rudaw noted that she was the second woman to hold the top office in Halabja, the first being Lady Adela (Adela Khanum), who served as "the effective mayor of the town from 1909 until her death in 1924." Nasih keeps a portrait of Lady Adela in her office.

Commenting on her appointment, Nasih stated: "Appointing women to senior positions is nothing new in Halabja. The educated people of the city have always supported this idea."

Her appointment was supported by Hero Ibrahim Ahmad, the former First Lady of Iraq and wife of PUK leader Jalal Talabani.

=== Acting Governor of Halabja ===
On 19 March 2025, Nasih was appointed Acting Governor of Halabja, becoming the first woman to hold a governorate-level executive position in Iraq's history and marking a significant step toward gender inclusion in Iraqi provincial leadership.

Her appointment followed the retirement of the previous governor, Azad Tofiq, and she continued to serve concurrently as governor of Halabja Central District. Upon assuming office, Nasih stated the she would continue to serve in accordance with the Kurdistan Regional Government's work programme.

In April 2025, Nasih played a central public role following the Iraqi parliament’s vote to recognize Halabja as Iraq's 19th province. She described the decision as a "historic day for the people of Halabja" and attributed the outcome to political consensus amongst Kurdish parties.

== Policy initiatives ==
=== Cross-border relations ===
As mayor, Nasih worked with officials in the neighbouring Iranian Kurdish province of Kermanshah to officially recognize two border crossings connecting the regions. Iran aimed to export electricity to the Kurdistan region through Halabja during her tenure.

=== Environmental initiatives ===
Nasih launched the 'Green City Halabja' campaign to end the use of plastic bags in the city, demonstrating her commitment to environmental protection and sustainability.

=== International engagement ===
In July 2025, Nasih met with United States Consul General Steven Bitner during his visit to Halabja. The consul general congratulated her on Halabja's elevation to governorate status and reaffirmed continued U.S. support for the province. A month later in August Nasih met with the Chinese Ambassador to Iraq H.E. Cui Wei and Chinese Consul General to Erbil Mr. Liu Jun, during the meeting the delegations reportedly 'exchanged views on advancing practical cooperation.'

== International advocacy ==
In 2019, Nasih spoke at George Washington University in Washington DC about the legacy of the genocidal Al-Anfal Campaign and the Halabja massacre, in which Saddam Hussein killed thousands of civilians in Halabja using poison gas in 1988.

== Political affiliation ==
Nasih is a member of the Patriotic Union of Kurdistan (PUK), one of the major Kurdish political parties in Iraq, and serves on the party's Central Council.

== Legacy and significance ==
Nuxsha Nasih's career represents a significant advancement for women in Kurdish and Iraqi politics. As the second female mayor in Halabja's modern history and the first female governor in Iraq's history, she has broken important barriers and served as a role model for women's political participation in the region. Her work in environmental protection, cross-border diplomacy, and genocide remembrance has established her as a prominent figure in Iraqi Kurdish politics.

== Personal life ==
Nuxsha Nasih is married and has two daughters. Nasih lost more than 45 members of her family to chemical weapons attacks during the Halabja Massacre.
