= Sirwan =

Sirwan may refer to:

- Sirwan River / Diyala River
- Sirwan, Iran
- Sirwan, Yemen
- Sirwan, Iraq
- Sirwan District
