= Bamo District =

Bamo ناوچەی بامو Nawçey Bamo
- District of Bamo
- Country: Iraq
- Autonomous region: Kurdistan Region
- Governorate: Halabja Governorate

Bamo (Kurdish: بامو, romanized: Bemo) is a district in the Halabja Governorate, Kurdistan Region of Iraq. Formerly a sub-district (nahiyah) of Halabja District within Sulaymaniyah Governorate, it was elevated to full district status when Halabja was designated a province by the Kurdistan Regional Government (KRG) in 2014. Its status was further consolidated when the Iraqi Parliament officially recognized Halabja as Iraq's 19th province on April 14, 2025.

== Geography ==
Bamo takes its name from Bamo Mountain (Çiyayê Bamû), a prominent peak in the region. The mountain's base area known locally as Sartaki Bamo, lies east of Darbandikhan, in terrain shared between Halabja and Sulaymaniyah governorates. The area is described as naturally beautiful and is visited by tourists primarily in spring and summer owing to its cooler high-altitude climate. Historical sources note the ruins of an ancient settlement called Yazdan Kurd atop Bamo Mountain, believed to have once been inhabited by Yazidi Kurds communities.

== History ==
Like the rest of Halabja Governorate, Bamo's modern administrative history is intertwined with the tragic events of the late 20th century. During the Anfal campaign (1987–1989) Halabja and its surrounding townships, including Bamo, Sirwan, Khurmal, and Biyara, were devastated. The chemical attack on Halabja on March 16, 1988 killed over 5,000 civilians and resulted in the displacement of approximately 140,000 people from the city and surrounding areas. Entire villages were razed, and over 25,000 homes were destroyed across the district.

Following the establishment of the Kurdish safe haven in 1991 and the fall of Saddam Hussein's regime in 2003, the region began a gradual process of reconstruction under KRG administration.
