= Sirwan District =

Sirwan District قەزای سیروان
- District
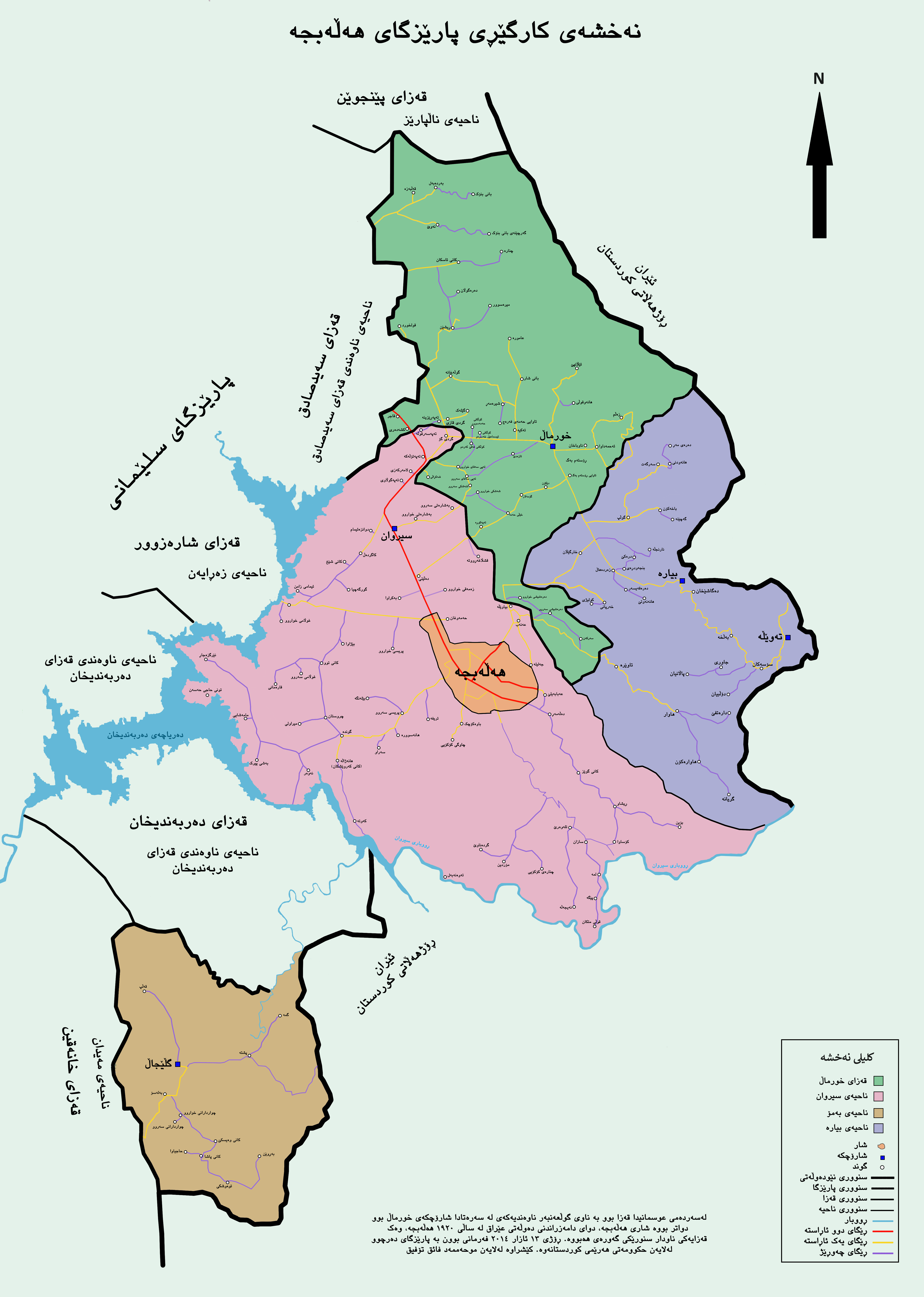
- the Halabja Governorate, Iraq
- Interactive map of Sirwan District
- Coordinates: 35.25°N 45.93°E
- Country: Iraq
- Region: Kurdistan Region
- Governorate: Halabja Governorate
- Time zone: UTC+3 (AST)

Sirwan District (Kurdish: قەزای سیروان, romanized: Qezay Sîrwan, Arabic: قضاء سيروان) is a district of the Halabja Governorate in Kurdistan Region, Iraq. Its center is the town of Sirwan, named after the Sirwan River that flows along its western edge, originating from Iranian territory and serving as one of the main tributaries of the Diyala River, while residents of the riverside areas rely on its waters to irrigate their farms and orchards.

== See also ==
- Bamo District
