= Byara =

Byara بیارە
- Town
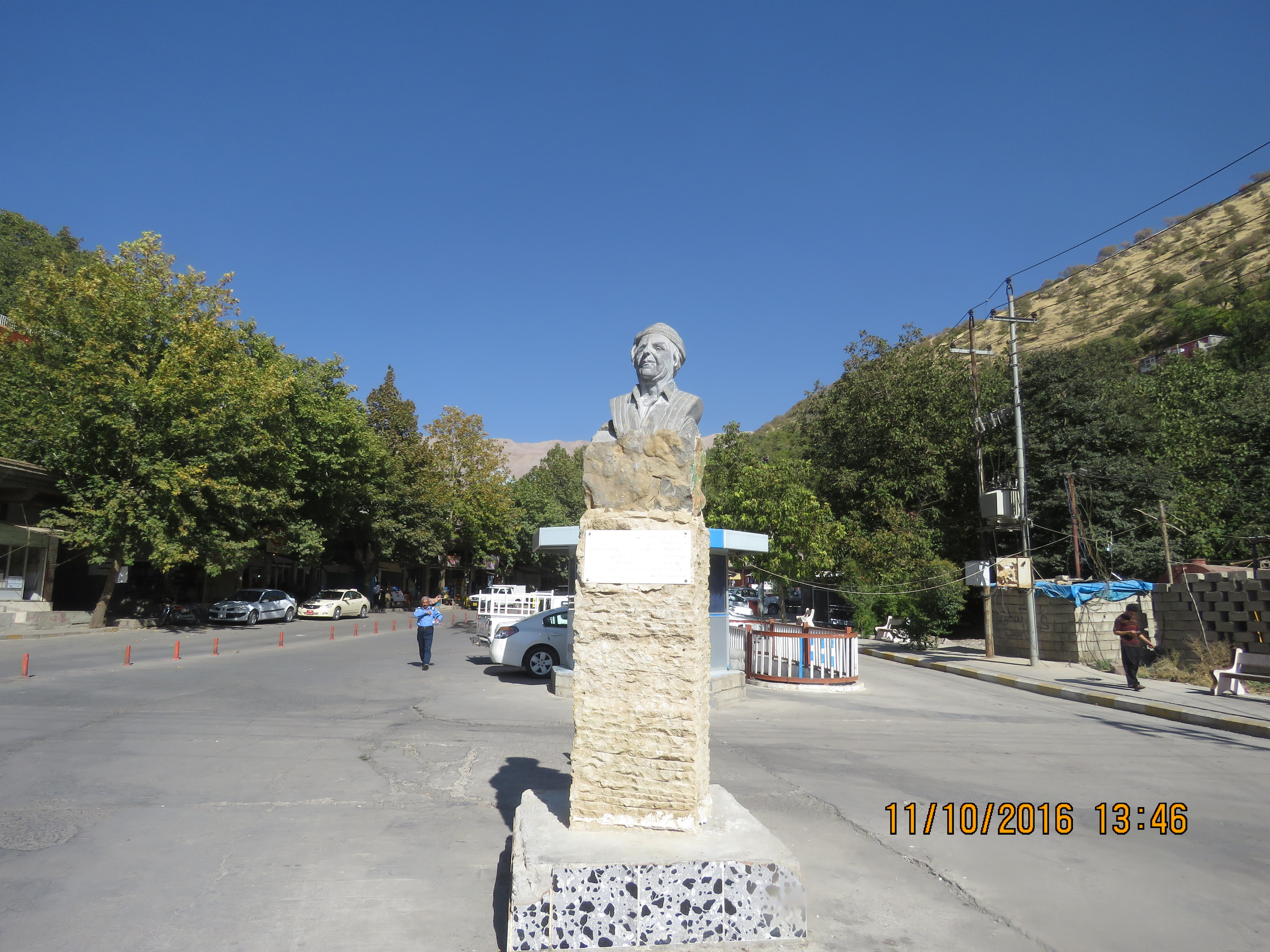
- Statue of Kurdish artist Othman Mumin Aziz in the city center of Byara
- Interactive map of Byara
- Location within Iraq
- Coordinates: 35.2298°N 46.1199°E
- Country: Iraq
- Region: Kurdistan Region
- Governorate: Halabja Governorate
- District: Byara District
- Time zone: UTC+3 (AST)

Byara (Kurdish: بیارە, romanized: Biyare) is a town located in the Halabja Governorate of the Kurdistan Region in Iraq. It is the main town of Byara District.

== Historical significance ==
Byara has a long history as a center of Kurdish culture and commerce. It was a key town in the historically significant Hawraman region. From 2001 to 2003, Byara was the center of the Islamic Emirate of Kurdistan, an unrecognized self-declared Kurdish Islamic state governed under Sharia law. The emirate controlled parts of the Halabja Governorate during this period. The Islamic Emirate was dissolved following the onset of the 2003 Iraq War, when a military operation led by U.S. forces and Kurdish Peshmerga forces of the Patriotic Union of Kurdistan and Kurdish Democratic Party.

== Economy ==
The economy of Byara is primarily agricultural. The fertile soil, combined with the local climate, allows for the cultivation of various crops, including cereals, vegetables, and fruits. Livestock farming, particularly sheep and goats, is also a significant part of the local economy. The town has a number of small markets where locals sell their produce and goods.
