= Vehicle registration plates of the Islamic State =

Islamic State
- Islamic State vehicle registration plate
- Country: Islamic State; Iraq Province; Syria Province

Current series
- Material: Metal

Availability
- Issued by: Traffic Department
- Manufactured by: Traffic Department
- Cost: In Syria: 1,000 Syrian pounds (800 for license plate; 200 for driving certificate); In Iraq: Unknown

History
- First issued: 2015
- Last issued: Unknown

The Islamic State (IS), a Salafi jihadist militant group and an unrecognized quasi-state, issued vehicle registration plates in territories under its control in Syria and Iraq, replacing government-issued plates. The plates, issued by the group's Traffic Department, typically bore the name "Islamic State", the relevant province, and a serial number. According to an IS official, the system was introduced to regulate vehicle ownership and traffic, and identify vehicles involved in accidents or violations.

In Syria, IS introduced registration plates for cars and motorcycles in Raqqa in 2015, requiring vehicle owners to obtain new plates and driving certificates, and pass an examination on driving and Islam. In Iraq, IS established traffic departments in Mosul and began issuing plates to replace existing Iraqi registration plates. The group enforced the system through fines, confiscation of vehicles, and restrictions on driving without authorized registration.

== Vehicle registration plates ==
IS replaced existing vehicle registration plates with new plates bearing the name “Islamic State,” the relevant Province, and a serial number. The measure had begun to be implemented and was described by Hatem Khalil, a professor at the University of Mosul, as an economic measure by the organization. The plates were issued by the group's Traffic Department.

Abu al-Farouq, an IS official, said that "like any other country, [IS] has the right to organize and manage the affairs of its subjects within its territory." The group introduced registration plates for cars and motorcycles in Raqqa following a series of traffic violations and accidents in which IS' authorities were unable to identify vehicle owners. He said the system was intended to improve traffic regulation, enforce traffic laws, and allow authorities to identify vehicle owners involved in accidents or other violations through registration records.

=== In Syria ===
In 2015, IS introduced vehicle registration plates for cars and motorcycles in Raqqa and required their owners to obtain new plates and driving certificates for vehicles operated in territory under its control. Applicants were required to submit three personal photos and a photo of their ID card, pay registration fees, and pass an oral exam before receiving their documentation.

According to a transport-vehicle owner in Raqqa, IS-affiliated Islamic Traffic Police instructed him to obtain an IS-issued license plate and driving certificate from the Traffic Department. Registrations costed 1,000 Syrian pounds, with 800 Syrian pounds allocated to the vehicle plate and 200 Syrian pounds to the driving certificate. Applicants were required to complete an oral examination covering aspects of driving and Islam. Those who failed the examination were required to retake it before receiving their plates and certificates.

=== In Iraq ===
An Islamic State vehicle registration plate held up in Mosul, Iraq

Following the removal of the former Nineveh traffic department's records and equipment, IS established a replacement traffic department in the Engineers Syndicate building in eastern Mosul. The department issued registration plates for cars and motorcycles. In Mosul, IS also began issuing plates to vehicles that lacked them, with the intention of eventually replacing existing Iraqi government plates.

In 2017, Iraqi security forces discovered a workshop in al-Dawasa, Mosul, belonging to IS' Traffic Department of Wilayat Nineveh. Officials said IS had used it to manufacture vehicle plates and registration documents, collect money from residents, and destroy original vehicle documents.

== Enforcement and laws ==
In Raqqa, vehicles without the required documentation could be confiscated and that their owners could be prohibited from driving vehicles without IS license plates. As it had done in Raqqa, IS prohibited vehicles in Mosul from operating without either an IS-issued license plate or a plate issued by the Iraqi government. Drivers without an official IS license plate could be fined US$43.

== See also ==
- Vehicle registration plates of Syria
- Vehicle registration plates of Iraq
