= Operation Zafar 7 =

1988 Iran–Iraq War operation

- Part of Iran–Iraq War
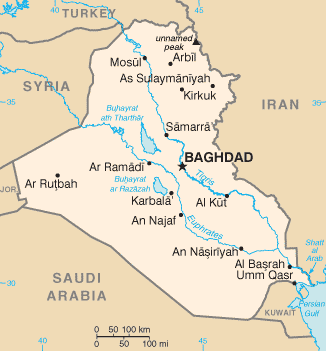
- Map of Iraq
| Date | Mid–March 1988 |
| Location | Southeast of Sulaymaniyah, Iraqi Kurdistan |
| Result | Limited Iranian victory: Tactical Iranian victory (Iran fails its main objective, only reaches the outskirts of the city); Iraqi forward defenses fails; Iraqi counter-attack fails; Successful Iraqi aerial and artillery strikes contains the Iranian offensive; Halabja chemical attack |
| Territorial changes | Iran reaches outskirts of Sulaymaniyah and the Darbandikhan reservoir but fails to capture it. |

Belligerents
| (Ba'athist Iraq) Iraq | Iran (Kurdistan Region) Peshmerga |

Commanders and leaders
| (Ba'athist Iraq) Saddam Hussein (Ba'athist Iraq) Ali Hasan al-Majid | (Iran) Ruhollah Khomeini (Iran) Hossein Hassani Sa'di (Kurdistan Region) Nawshirwan Mustafa |

Operation Zafar 7 (Persian: عملیات ظفر ۷) was an Iranian offensive during the Iran–Iraq War. The Iranian military operation was successfully led by Lieutenant General Hossein Hassani Sa'di where Iran won the battle and also repelled the ensuing Iraqi counterattack. However, Iran faced technical setbacks with massive economic and military sanctions in place against the country. As a result of those setbacks, Iran was unable to reach its objective of capturing Sulaymaniyah.

== Prelude ==
After Iran's failure to capture Basra during the sixth Battle of Basra (Operation Karbala-5), Iran's military entered a period of self-reflection, and possible decline. Iranian morale was decreasing, and many of their experienced infantry from the Revolutionary Guards (Pasdaran) became casualties. Consequently, the Iranians increasingly relied on their regular army to fight the war. In addition to the army being conscription based, the Iranians became increasingly war-weary. The front in the south of Iraq had become a stalemate. Iran was unable to penetrate the massive Iraqi defenses. Meanwhile, Iraq for the time being remained unable to drive the Iranians back, but they had begun to re-arm with the help of friendly nations and foreign allies, and were practicing maneuvers in preparation for the upcoming operations against the Iranians. By 1988, Iraq grossly outnumbered Iran in men and military hardware. Nevertheless, Iranian commanders remained skilled and adept. They focused on tactics that would negate superior Iraqi firepower. Nevertheless, they were unable to capture cities in central and southern Iraq due to a combination of poor logistics, shortages of armor, and Iraqi firepower. Iran's leadership also announced that they would arm and support opposition groups inside of Iraq. One of those opponents was the Peshmerga, the Kurdistan resistance force, which primarily launch limited offensives of their own.

While the war in the south had bogged down into a stalemate, Iran began focusing on Kurdistan, which was in a mountainous region in northern Iraq. Being mountainous and thus unsuitable for armored warfare, Iran had launched multiple attacks starting from late 1987 to early 1988. They were supported by the Peshmerga, which they helped and gave supplies to. While Iran would not capture any major cities, with the help of the Peshmerga's guerilla warfare, using area denial tactics, large swaths of Kurdistan were rendered outside of Iraqi government control. Saddam Hussein ordered the Al-Anfal Campaign, resulting in as many as 50,000 rebels and civilians murdered. The Al-Anfal campaign was led by Saddam's deputy Ali Hassan al-Majid, infamously known as "Chemical Ali" due to his use of poison gas. Nevertheless, with Iranian support, the Iraqi attempts were unsuccessful, and were a major headache for Saddam and his deputies.

== The battle ==
The Iranians struck south-east of Sulaymaniyah where they easily defeated most of the Iraqi defenders because Saddam Hussein left them to defend even the most exposed positions. After the Iranians had defeated the Iraqi forces at the front lines, they advanced quickly. However, the Iraqis launched a counter-attack during the Iranian advance. The Iraqi soldiers involved in the counter-attack were ambushed by the Iranians and most Iraqi troops were killed. Victory seemed to be in the hands of Iranians as they came close to Sulaymaniyah but they failed to capture it. The Iranians also came dangerously close to Iraq's Darbandikhan reservoir. The Iraqis responded by launching 720 chemical artillery rockets and 200 chemical artillery shells which resulted in the Iranian 55th parachute division taking heavy losses and wiping out of the 84th infantry division, forcing the Iranians to call off the offensive.

== Halabja ==
The Iraqi counter-attack was a disaster for the Kurds. Saddam responded with a chemical gas attack on Halabja. The Halabja poison gas attack occurred in the period 15–19 March 1988 during the Iran–Iraq War when chemical weapons were used by the Iraqi government forces on the Iraqi Kurdish town of Halabja (population 80,000). This was separate from the al-Anfal Campaign but both were considered acts of genocide. Halabja, which is located approximately 150 miles northeast of Baghdad and 8–10 miles from the Iranian border, was significantly damaged with 5,000 dead and a further 10,000 injured. The Iraqi government defended their use of poison gas, citing it as a way to “protect itself against invasion.”
