= Sirwan (town) =

- Interactive map of Sirwan
- Coordinates: 35°15′15″N 45°56′24″E

Sirwan is a town and the center of Sirwan District in of Halabja Governorate, Kurdistan Region of Iraq. It is located approximately 8 km northwest of Halabja city, at an elevation of 1,700 feet above sea level, and named after the Sirwan River.

== History ==
Sirwan originally consisted of two villages, In 1956, Sheikh Mahmud Barzanji visited the area and met with its residents at the Kani Wes site, where he promised to unite the two villages into an independent administrative unit. This was realized in 1957 when the district was officially declared. In 1979, the Iraqi government’s policy of demolishing border villages led to the displacement of their residents, who were subsequently resettled in the new Sirwan complex.

=== The Sirwan Massacre of 1986 ===
In the early hours of August 6, 1986, Iranian artillery began shelling the Sirwan area. Hundreds of families gathered for shelter in buildings that were still under construction, and the fires caused by the shelling claimed the lives of 200 Hewramî Kurds, the majority of whom were women and children. The victims were families who had been displaced to Sirwan by the former Iraqi regime under Saddam Hussein in the late 1970s, as the Iraqi government was clearing mountainous areas near the border to establish military positions for attacking Kurdish Peshmerga forces. The building in which the victims perished was later converted into a memorial commemorating the tragedy.

=== Sirwan in the Anfal Campaign ===
On March 16, 1988, during the final stages of the First Gulf War, the Iraqi Baathist regime under Saddam Hussein launched a chemical attack on the city of Halabja, deploying deadly agents including mustard gas, cyanide, sarin, and tabun. The attack resulted in a massacre that killed thousands, filling the streets with the bodies of men, women, and children, and forcing 140,000 people to flee. In this context, the Baathist regime razed Halabja and the surrounding areas to the ground, including Sirwan and neighboring towns, destroying more than 25,000 homes and wiping entire villages off the map.
