= Byara District =

Byara ناوچەی بیاره Nawçey Biyare
- Town
- District of Byara
- Location within Iraq
- Coordinates: 35.2298°N 46.1199°E
- Country: Iraq
- Autonomous region: Kurdistan
- Governorate: Halabja Governorate
- Established: 1889

Government
  - District Governor: Nokhasha Naseh Ahmed
- Time zone: UTC+3 (AST)

Byara District (Kurdish: ناوچەی بیاره, romanized: Nawçey Biyare) is a district in the Halabja Governorate, in the Kurdistan Region of Iraq. It spans the mountainous Hawraman region along Iraq's border with Iran. Its population is composed of predominantly Kurdish people following Islam. The district's economy is anchored in agriculture, supplemented by tourism. Its capital is the city of Byara.

== Geography ==
Byara District is located in the Halabja Governorate, in the Hawraman mountains in the Kurdistan Region along Iraq's border with Iran. The district is interspersed with various waterfalls, and mountains. Cold winters cause seasonal snowfall in the region, with people forced to travel to the town of Byara for essentials.

== Demographics and economy ==
Estimated population describe about 3,000 to 6,000 residents, including mixed communities across Byara and nearby villages. Most of them are Kurdish following Islam, who speak the Hawrami Kurdish dialect, and have strong cultural connections to Iran's Kurdistan across the border. Byara serves as a hub for cultural, natural, and religious tourism. The economy of Byara is dependent on agriculture and the district is known for its walnuts, pomegranates, and figs. Infrastructure improvements including new roads, health centers, and sewage systems have been built in the 2020s.

== See also ==
- Bamo District
