= Modern history of Iraq =

History of Iraq since World War I

After World War I, Iraq passed from the failing Ottoman Empire to British control. Kingdom of Iraq was established under the British Mandate in 1932. In the 14 July Revolution of 1958, the king was deposed and the Republic of Iraq was declared. In 1963, the Ba'ath Party staged a coup d'état and was in turn toppled by another coup in the same year, but managed to retake power in 1968. Saddam Hussein took power in 1979 and ruled Iraq for the remainder of the century, during the Iran–Iraq War of the 1980s, the Invasion of Kuwait and the Gulf War of 1990 to 1991 and the UN sanction during the 1990s. Saddam was removed from power in the 2003 invasion of Iraq.

== British Mandate ==
Ottoman rule over Iraq lasted until the First World War when the Ottomans sided with Germany and the Central Powers. In the Mesopotamian campaign against the Central Powers, British forces invaded the country and suffered a major defeat at the hands of the Turkish army during the Siege of Kut (1915–16). British forces regrouped and captured Baghdad in 1917. An armistice was signed in 1918.

Map of the Ottoman Iraq.

Modern Iraq was established from the former three Ottoman provinces, Baghdad Vilayet, Mosul Vilayet and Basra Vilayet, which were known as Al-'Iraq. The Sykes-Picot agreement was a secret agreement between UK and France with the assent of Imperial Russia, defining their respective sphere of influence and control in West Asia after the expected downfall of the Ottoman Empire during World War I. The Agreement was concluded on 16 May 1916. On 11 November 1920 it became a League of Nations mandate under British control with the name "State of Iraq".

Britain imposed a Hāshimite monarchy on Iraq and defined the territorial limits of Iraq without taking into account the politics of the different ethnic and religious groups in the country, in particular those of the Kurds and the Assyrians to the north. During the British occupation, the Shi'ites and Kurds fought for independence.

Faced with spiralling costs and influenced by the public protestations of T. E. Lawrence in The Times, Britain replaced Arnold Wilson in October 1920 with new Civil Commissioner Sir Percy Cox. Cox managed to quell the rebellion, yet was also responsible for implementing the fateful policy of close cooperation with Iraq's Sunni minority.

In the Mandate period and beyond, the British supported the traditional, Sunni leadership (such as the tribal shaykhs) over the growing, urban-based nationalist movement. The Land Settlement Act gave the tribal shaykhs the right to register the communal tribal lands in their own name. The Tribal Disputes Regulations gave them judiciary rights, whereas the Peasants' Rights and Duties Act of 1933 severely reduced the tenants', forbidding them to leave the land unless all their debts to the landlord had been settled. The British resorted to military force when their interests were threatened, as in the 1941 Rashīd `Alī al-Gaylānī coup. This coup led to a British invasion of Iraq using forces from the British Indian Army and the Arab Legion from Jordan.

== Kingdom of Iraq ==
Emir Faisal, leader of the Arab revolt against the Ottoman sultān during the Great War, and member of the Sunni Hashimite family from Mecca, became the first king of the new state. He obtained the throne partly by the influence of T. E. Lawrence. Although the monarch was legitimized and proclaimed King by a plebiscite in 1921, nominal independence was only achieved in 1932, when the British Mandate officially ended.

In 1927, huge oil fields were discovered near Kirkuk and brought economic improvement. Exploration rights were granted to the Iraqi Petroleum Company, which despite the name, was a British oil company. King Faisal I was succeeded by his son Ghazi in December 1933. King Ghazi's reign lasted five and a half years. He claimed Iraqi sovereignty over Kuwait. An avid amateur racer, the king drove his car into a lamppost and died 3 April 1939. His son Faisal followed him to the throne.

King Faisal II (1935–1958) was the only son of King Ghazi I and Queen `Aliyah. The new king was four when his father died. His uncle 'Abd al-Ilah became regent (April 1939 – May 1953). Abd al-llah's appointment changed the delicate balance between the palace, the officer corps, the civilian political elite and the British. Abd al-llah differed from his late brother-in-law in that he was more tolerant of the continued British presence in Iraq. Indeed, he was in some respect positively enthusiastic about the link with Great Britain, seeing it as one of the principal guarantors of the Hashemite dynasty. This meant that he had little in common with the Arab nationalist army officers whom he tended to regard as social upstarts, unworthy of his cultivation.

In 1945, Iraq joined the United Nations and became a founding member of the Arab League. At the same time, the Kurdish leader Mustafa Barzani led a rebellion against the central government in Baghdad. After the failure of the uprising Barzani and his followers fled to the Soviet Union.

In 1948, Iraq entered the 1948 Arab–Israeli War along with other members of the Arab League in order to defend Palestinian rights. Iraq was not a party to the cease-fire agreement signed in May 1949. The war had a negative impact on Iraq's economy. The government had to allocate 40 percent of available funds to the army and for the Palestinian refugees. Oil royalties paid to Iraq were halved when the pipeline to Haifa was cut.

Iraq signed the Baghdad Pact in 1956. It allied Iraq, Turkey, Iran, Pakistan, and the United Kingdom. Its headquarters were in Baghdad. The Pact constituted a direct challenge to Egyptian president Gamal Abdal Nasser. In response, Nasser launched a media campaign that challenged the legitimacy of the Iraqi monarchy.

In February 1958, King Hussein of Jordan and `Abd al-Ilāh proposed a union of Hāshimite monarchies to counter the recently formed Egyptian-Syrian union. The prime minister Nuri as-Said wanted Kuwait to be part of the proposed Arab-Hāshimite Union. Shaykh `Abd-Allāh as-Salīm, the ruler of Kuwait, was invited to Baghdad to discuss Kuwait's future. This policy brought the government of Iraq into direct conflict with Britain, which did not want to grant independence to Kuwait. At that point, the monarchy found itself completely isolated. Nuri as-Said was able to contain the rising discontent only by resorting to ever greater political oppression.

== Republic of Iraq ==
=== 1958 revolution ===
Inspired by Nasser, officers from the Nineteenth Brigade known as "Free Officers", under the leadership of Brigadier Abd al-Karīm Qāsim (known as "az-Za`īm", 'the leader') and Colonel Abdul Salam Arif overthrew the Hashimite monarchy on 14 July 1958. King Faisal II and `Abd al-Ilāh were executed in the gardens of ar-Rihāb Palace. Their bodies (and those of many others in the royal family) were displayed in public. Nuri as-Said evaded capture for one day, but after attempting to escape disguised as a veiled woman, he was caught and shot.

The new government proclaimed Iraq to be a republic and rejected the idea of a union with Jordan. Iraq's activity in the Baghdād Pact ceased.

When Qāsim distanced himself from `Abd an-Nāsir, he faced growing opposition from pro-Egypt officers in the Iraqi army. `Arif, who wanted closer cooperation with Egypt, was stripped of his responsibilities and thrown in prison.

When the garrison in Mosul rebelled against Qāsim's policies, he allowed the Kurdish leader Barzānī to return from exile in the Soviet Union to help suppress the pro-Nāsir rebels.

=== Early 1960s ===
In 1961, Kuwait gained independence from Britain and Iraq claimed sovereignty over Kuwait. As in the 1930s, Qasim based Iraq's claim on the assertion that Kuwait had been a district of the Ottoman province of Basra, unjustly severed by the British from the main body of Iraqi state when it had been created in the 1920s. Britain reacted strongly to Iraq's claim and sent troops to Kuwait to deter Iraq. Qāsim was forced to back down. After Qasim's death, the new government of Iraq recognized the sovereignty of Kuwait in October 1963.

A period of considerable instability followed.

=== 1963 Ba'ath coup ===
Qāsim was assassinated in February 1963, when the Ba'ath Party took power under the leadership of General Ahmed Hasan al-Bakr (prime minister) and Colonel Abdul Salam Arif (president). Nine months later `Abd as-Salam Muhammad `Arif led a successful coup against the Ba'ath government.

=== 1966 re-installation of Republic ===
On 13 April 1966, President Abdul Salam Arif died in a helicopter crash and was succeeded by his brother, General Abdul Rahman Arif. In 1967–1968 Iraqi communists launched an insurgency in southern Iraq.

== Ba'athist Iraq ==
=== 1968 Ba'ath return to power ===
Following the Six-Day War of 1967, the Ba'ath Party felt strong enough to retake power (17 July 1968). Ahmad Hasan al-Bakr became president and chairman of the Revolutionary Command Council (RCC).

Barzānī and the Kurds who had begun a rebellion in 1961 were still causing problems in 1969. The secretary-general of the Ba'ath Party, Saddam Hussein, was given responsibility to find a solution. It was clear that it was impossible to defeat the Kurds by military means and in 1970 a political agreement was reached between the rebels and the Iraqi government.

Iraq's economy recovered sharply after the 1968 revolution. The Arif brothers had spent close to 90% of the national budget on the army but the Ba'ath government gave priority to agriculture and industry. The British Iraq Petroleum Company monopoly was broken when a new contract was signed with ERAP, a major French oil company. Later the IPC was nationalized. As a result of these policies Iraq experienced rapid economic growth.

=== 1970s ===
During the 1970s, border disputes with Iraq and Kuwait caused many problems. Kuwait's refusal to allow Iraq to build a harbor in the Shatt al-Arab delta strengthened Iraq's belief that foreign powers in the region were trying to control the Persian Gulf. Iran's occupation of numerous islands in the Strait of Hormuz didn't help alter Iraq's fears. The border disputes between Iraq and Iran were temporarily resolved with the signing of the Algiers Accord on 6 March 1975.

In 1972 an Iraqi delegation visited Moscow. The same year diplomatic relations with the US were restored. Relations with Jordan and Syria were good. Iraqi troops were stationed in both countries. During the 1973 October War, Iraqi divisions engaged Israeli forces.

In retrospect, the 1970s can be seen as a high point in Iraq's modern history. A new, young, technocratic elite was governing the country and the fast-growing economy brought prosperity and stability. Many Arabs outside Iraq considered it an example. However, the following decades would not be as favorable for the fledgling country.

=== Rise to power of Saddam Hussein ===
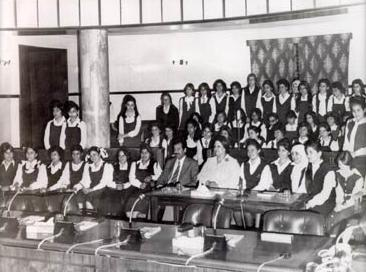
Promoting women's education in the 1970s.

In July 1979, President Ahmed Hassan al-Bakr resigned, and his chosen successor, Saddam Hussein, assumed the offices of both President and Chairman of the Revolutionary Command Council. He was the de facto ruler of Iraq for some years before he formally came to power. The Baath Party was now a country wide organisation, reaching down to the smallest village and most modest neighbourhood in an unprecedented way. In addition, the Popular army and the youth organisation brought ever larger numbers into the paramilitary formations established by the regime. Finally, Saddam Hussein established a National Assembly in March 1980, setting up the first parliament since the overthrow of the Monarchy in 1958. It was meant to create the impression of national unity and to give Saddam Hussain another forum for presenting himself as the national leader.

The new regime modernized the countryside and rural areas of Iraq, mechanizing agriculture and establishing farm cooperatives.

Saddam's organizational prowess was credited with Iraq's rapid pace of development in the 1970s; development went forward at such a fevered pitch that two million persons from other Arab countries and even Yugoslavia worked in Iraq to meet the growing demand for labor.

However, Hussein's ambition soon led him to be involved in various conflicts, with disastrous results to the infrastructure of Iraq.

=== Iran-Iraq war ===
Territorial disputes with Iran led to an inconclusive and costly eight-year war, the Iran–Iraq War (1980–1988, termed Qādisiyyat-Saddām – 'Saddam's Qādisiyyah'), which devastated the economy. Iraq declared victory in 1988 but actually achieved a weary return to the status quo ante bellum. The war left Iraq with the largest military establishment in the Persian Gulf region but with huge debts and an ongoing rebellion by Kurdish elements in the northern mountains. The government suppressed the rebellion. Eight years of war had taken a terrible toll of the Iraqi population: the war had cost Iraq an estimated quarter of those had been victims of the Iraqi Kurds; over 60,000 Iraqis remained prisoners of the Iranians; nearly one million Iraqis now served in the armed forces.

Between 1986 and 1989, Hussein's Al-Anfal Campaign is alleged to have killed an estimated 100,000 to 200,000 Kurdish civilians.

A mass chemical weapons attack on the city of Halabja in March 1988 during the Iran–Iraq War is usually attributed to Saddam's regime, although responsibility for the attack is a matter of some dispute. Saddam maintained his innocence in this matter up to his execution in December 2006. Almost all current accounts of the incident regard the Iraqi regime as the party responsible for the gas attack (as opposed to Iran), and the event has become iconic in depictions of Saddam's cruelty. Estimates of casualties range from several hundred to at least 7,000 people. The Iraqi government continued to be supported by a broad international community including most of the West, the Soviet Union, and the People's Republic of China, which continued sending arms shipments to combat Iran. Indeed, shipments from the US (though always a minority) increased after this date, and the UK awarded £400 million in trade credits to Iraq ten days after condemning the massacre .

In the late 1970s, Iraq purchased a French nuclear reactor, dubbed Osirak or Tammuz 1. Construction began in 1979. In 1980, the reactor site suffered minor damage due to an Iranian air strike, and in 1981, before the reactor could be completed, it was destroyed by the Israeli Air Force in Operation Opera.

=== 1990 Invasion of Kuwait and the Gulf War ===
A long-standing territorial dispute led to the invasion of Kuwait in 1990. Iraq accused Kuwait of violating the Iraqi border to secure oil resources, and demanded that its debt repayments should be waived. Direct negotiations began in July 1990, but they soon failed. Saddam Hussein had an emergency meeting with April Glaspie, the United States Ambassador to Iraq, on 25 July 1990, airing his concerns but stating his intention to continue talks. April Glaspie informed Saddām that the United States had no interest in border disputes between Iraq and Kuwait, as was the U.S. government's official tone on the subject at the time. Subsequent events would prove otherwise, however this was said to Saddam in hopes that it would prevent him from attacking.

Arab mediators convinced Iraq and Kuwait to negotiate their differences in Jiddah, Saudi Arabia, on 1 August 1990, but that session resulted only in charges and counter-charges. A second session was scheduled to take place in Baghdad, but Iraq invaded Kuwait the following day. Iraqi troops overran the country shortly after midnight on 2 August 1990. The United Nations Security Council and the Arab League immediately condemned the Iraqi invasion. Four days later, the Security Council imposed an economic embargo on Iraq that prohibited nearly all trade with Iraq.

Iraq responded to the sanctions by annexing Kuwait as the "19th Province" of Iraq on 8 August, prompting the exiled Sabah family to call for a stronger international response. Over the ensuing months, the United Nations Security Council passed a series of resolutions that condemned the Iraqi occupation of Kuwait and implemented total mandatory economic sanctions against Iraq. Other countries subsequently provided support for "Operation Desert Shield". Acting on the policy of the Carter Doctrine, and out of fear the Iraqi Army could launch an invasion of Saudi Arabia, U.S. President George H. W. Bush quickly announced that the U.S. would launch a "wholly defensive" mission to prevent Iraq from invading Saudi Arabia. Operation Desert Shield was when U.S. troops were moved into Saudi Arabia on 7 August 1990. In November 1990, the UN Security Council adopted Resolution 678, permitting member states to use all necessary means, authorizing military action against the Iraqi forces occupying Kuwait and demanded a complete withdrawal by 15 January 1991.

When Saddam Hussein failed to comply with this demand, the Gulf War (Operation "Desert Storm") ensued on 17 January 1991 (3am Iraqi time), with allied troops of 28 countries, led by the US launching an aerial bombardment on Baghdad. The war, which proved disastrous for Iraq, lasted only six weeks. One hundred and forty-thousand tons of munitions had showered down on the country, the equivalent of seven Hiroshima bombs. Probably as many as 30,000 Iraqi soldiers and a few thousand of civilians were killed.

Allied air raids destroyed roads, bridges, factories, and oil-industry facilities (shutting down the national refining and distribution system) and disrupted electric, telephone, and water service. On 13 February 1991, hundreds of Iraqis were killed in the attack on the Al-Amiriyah bomb shelter. Diseases spread through contaminated drinking water because water purification and sewage treatment facilities could not operate without electricity.

A cease-fire was announced by the US on 28 February 1991. UN Secretary-General Javier Pérez de Cuéllar met with Saddam Hussein to discuss the Security Council timetable for the withdraw of troops from Kuwait. Iraq agreed to UN terms for a permanent cease-fire in April 1991, and strict conditions were imposed, demanding the disclosure and destruction of all stockpiles of weapons.

In March 1991 revolts in the Shia-dominated southern Iraq started involving demoralized Iraqi Army troops and the anti-government Shia parties. Another wave of insurgency broke out shortly afterwards in the Kurdish populated northern Iraq (see 1991 uprisings in Iraq). Although they presented a serious threat to the Iraqi Ba'ath Party regime, Saddam Hussein managed to suppress the rebellions with massive and indiscriminate force and maintained power. They were ruthlessly crushed by the loyalist forces spearheaded by the Iraqi Republican Guard and the population was successfully terrorized. During the few weeks of unrest tens of thousands of people were killed. Many more died during the following months, while nearly two million Iraqis fled for their lives. In the aftermath, the government intensified the forced relocating of Marsh Arabs and the draining of the Iraqi marshlands, while the Allies established the Iraqi no-fly zones.

=== Iraq under UN Sanctions ===
On 6 August 1990, after the Iraqi invasion of Kuwait, the U.N. Security Council adopted Resolution 661 which imposed economic sanctions on Iraq, providing for a full trade embargo, excluding medical supplies, food and other items of humanitarian necessity, these to be determined by the Security Council sanctions committee. After the end of the Gulf War and after the Iraqi withdrawal from Kuwait, the sanctions were linked to removal of weapons of mass destruction by Resolution 687 . From 1991 until 2003 the effects of government policy and sanctions regime led to hyperinflation, widespread poverty and malnutrition. The historically generous state welfare provision that had been central to the regime's governing strategy disappeared overnight. The large and well-educated middle class that had grown in the years of plenty to form the bedrock of Iraqi society was impoverished. The story of Iraq from 1991 until 2003 is of a country suffering a profound macroeconomic shock.

The United States, citing a need to prevent the genocide of the Marsh Arabs in southern Iraq and the Kurds to the north, declared "air exclusion zones" north of the 36th parallel and south of the 32nd parallel. The Clinton administration judged an alleged assassination attempt on former President George H. W. Bush by Iraqi secret agents to be worthy of a military response on 27 June 1993. The Iraqi Intelligence Headquarters in Baghdad was targeted by Tomahawk cruise missiles.

During the time of the UN sanctions, internal and external opposition to the Ba'ath government was weak and divided. In May 1995, Saddam sacked his half-brother, Wathban, as Interior Minister and in July demoted his Defense Minister, Ali Hassan al-Majid. These personnel changes were the result of the growth in power of Saddām Hussein's two sons, Uday Hussein and Qusay Hussein, who were given effective vice-presidential authority in May 1995. In August Major General Husayn Kāmil Hasan al-Majīd, Minister of Military Industries and a political ally of Saddam, defected to Jordan, together with his wife (one of Saddam's daughters) and his brother, Saddam, who was married to another of the president's daughters; both called for the overthrow of the Iraqi government. After a few weeks in Jordan, being given promises for their safety, the two brothers returned to Iraq where they were killed.

The effects of the sanctions on the civilian population of Iraq have been disputed. Whereas it was widely believed that the sanctions caused a major rise in child mortality, recent research has shown that commonly cited data were fabricated by the Iraqi government and that "there was no major rise in child mortality in Iraq after 1990 and during the period of the sanctions."

Iraqi cooperation with UN weapons inspection teams was questioned on several occasions during the 1990s. UNSCOM chief weapons inspector Richard Butler withdrew his team from Iraq in November 1998 because of Iraq's lack of cooperation. The team returned in December. Butler prepared a report for the UN Security Council afterwards in which he expressed dissatisfaction with the level of compliance . The same month, US President Bill Clinton authorized air strikes on government targets and military facilities. Air strikes against military facilities and alleged WMD sites continued into 2002.
