= Vehicle registration plates of Iraq =

The Iraqi vehicle registration plate is a license plate used for official identification purposes for motor vehicles in Iraq.

== Design and format ==
The license plates are in Standard European size (520mm x 110 mm). With a bar on the left hand side, where the code IRQ, representing Iraq is shown in a vertical manner. In the 4 governorates of Kurdistan region, the bar on the left hand side features a smaller sized code KR, representing Kurdistan Region.

Current license plate design is the result of negotiations between Federal Government and Kurdistan Regional Government to unify the design of license plates across the country. The license plates are in Latin alphabet and western Arabic numerals, instead of the old plates in Arabic and Eastern Arabic numerals, and Governorates of Iraq are represented by a code, instead of their fully name written out.

The current format has been issued since April 2022 in the four governorates of Kurdistan Region. The rest of Iraq followed suit starting from June 2024.

License plates follow the following format: GG X ####, where GG is a two digit code indicating the Governorate. This format is the first time that Halabja Governorate gets its own representation.

Plates of size 335x155 mm are issued on shall issue basis for vehicles with license plate size restrictions.

Below are the codes for governorates of Iraq.

Code	Governorate
11	Baghdad Governorate
12	Nineveh Governorate
13	Maysan Governorate
14	Basra Governorate
15	Al Anbar Governorate
16	Al-Qādisiyyah Governorate
17	Muthanna Governorate
18	Babil Governorate
19	Karbala Governorate
20	Diyala Governorate
21	Sulaymaniyah Governorate
22	Erbil Governorate
23	Halabja Governorate
24	Duhok Governorate
25	Kirkuk Governorate
26	Saladin Governorate
27	Dhi Qar Governorate
28	Najaf Governorate
29	Wasit Governorate

Codes 21 to 24 are for governorates under the jurisdiction of Kurdistan Region. In these governorates a smaller sized code KR, representing Kurdistan Region is placed on the license plates as well.

Colour	Image (Rest of Iraq)	Image (Kurdistan)	Type
White			Private vehicle
Red			Vehicle for hire, bus, taxi
Blue			Governmental
Yellow			Trade, e.g. trucks, tractors, cranes
Green			Agricultural
Red on white			Temporary

For Kurdistan Region, as the letter-digit configuration has undergone a change, certain rules apply for the transition into new plates.

- If the existing plate consists of 5 or less digits, the letter A will be placed before the number, and zeros will be added so that the new number would end up being 5 digits.
- If it consists of the following 6 digit numbers: 100000, 200000, .... 900000, one of the zeros will be removed, and the letter M will be placed before the number
- If it consists of any other 6 digit number, and if the first digit is 0 the letter B, if 1 the letter C, if 2 the letter D, ..., and if 9 the letter L will be placed before the number.

For rest of Iraq, such issue does not exist, and the only change in the registration number of the plate would be the replacement of the governorate name with the corresponding code. The previous format already had Latin letter and numbers in small font, these are to be preserved through the transition.

=== Historical Formats ===
==== 1988-2001 ====
In 1988, Iraq adopted a new license plate format. This new format applied to all governorates of Iraq.

Up until 2001, the all Iraqi license plates were of this format, including those issued to Iraqi-occupied Kuwait for a duration of 6 months in 1990 and 1991. Whereas the de facto autonomous Kurdistan Region did not follow suit, rest of Iraq adopted a new license plate format in 2001.

The license plate was divided in half with a horizontal line. On the bottom right quarter, the name of the country "Al-Iraq" in Arabic is written. On the bottom left quarter, the name of the province in Arabic. On the top of the license plate, there's the registration number.

==== 2001-2008 ====
In 2001, the shape and dimensions of the license plates changed, while the general format remained the same. The length of the plate was increased, while its width was reduced. The font of the plate was also changed. The name of the country "Al-Iraq", and the name of the province were moved to the left hand side of the license plate, with the country name above the province name. The coloring and classifications of the new license plates remained unchanged.

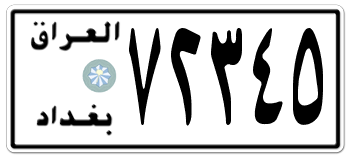
2001-2008 Format Private Vehicle Plate

2001-2008 Format with 335x155mm Dimensions

2001-2008 Format Commercial Truck Plate

==== 2008-2024 ====
This license plate format was adopted on 2008. The license plate was rectangular in shape and made of aluminum, with a dimension of 335x155 mm. On the left side, the word "Iraq" appeared in English, written vertically. There was a horizontal line that divided the license plate into two sections. In the narrower bottom section, the name of the Province was written, plus the classification of the license plate in Arabic. In the top, the registration code was written, large font in Arabic, and underneath it, smaller font in Latin. The license plate consisted of a letter, and a 5-digit number.

Colour	Image	Type	Type in Arabic
White		Private vehicle	خصوصي
White		Motorcycle	دراجة
White		Temporary	فحص مؤقت
Red		Vehicle for hire, bus, taxi	اجرة
Blue		Governmental; No Province name	حكومية
Yellow		Trade, e.g. trucks, tractors, cranes	حمل
Orange		Temporary awaiting Customs Clearance; No Province Name	ادخال كمرکي مؤقت
Green		Agricultural	زراعي
Green		Construction	إنشائية
Black		ICTS	جهاز مكافحة الارهاب

Letters used for Vehicle Registration
Letter (Arabic)	Letter (Latin)
ا	A
ب	B
ج	J
د	D
ر	R
س	S
ط	T
ف	F
ك	K
م	M
ن	N
هـ	H
ى	E
ق	Q
ل	L
و	W
ز	Z

==== Kurdistan Region ====
===== 1988-2022 =====
The format that was introduced in 1988, continued to be used in the Kurdistan Region . Since 1992, the Kurdistan Region has had de facto, and from the year 2005, also constitutionally-recognized autonomy, the license format changes that affected the rest of Iraq, were not enforced in the Kurdistan Region. This region still continued to use the old format from 1988 until 2022.

The license plate is divided in half with a horizontal line. On the bottom right quarter, the name of the country "Al-Iraq" in Arabic is written. On the bottom left quarter, the name of the province in Arabic. On the top of the license plate, there's the registration number. Currently, the provinces of Erbil, Sulaymaniyah and Dohuk use 6-digit numbers. No information exists as of yet on the province of Halabja

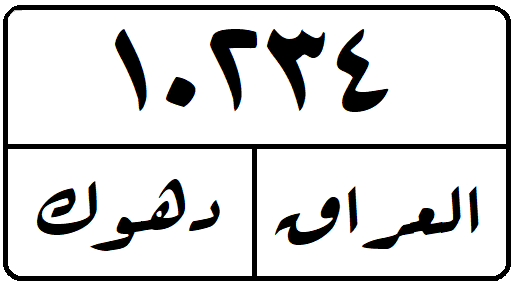
Dohuk Governorate

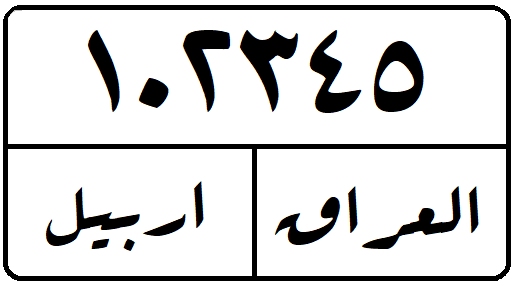
Erbil Governorate

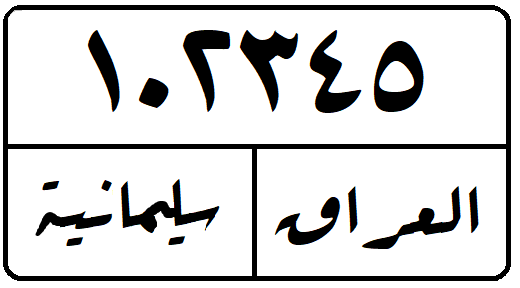
Sulaymaniyah Governorate

The different classes of the license plates are differentiated by the colour of their background. Besides that, there are no texts or different number or letter on each different class of each plate to differentiate them.

Colour	Image	Type
Black on White		Private vehicle
Black on White		Private vehicle, International plate
White on Red		Vehicle for hire, bus, taxi
Black on Yellow		Trade, e.g. trucks, tractors, cranes
White on Blue		Law Enforcement
Golden on Dark Green		Military
Red on White		Temporary

== Gallery ==
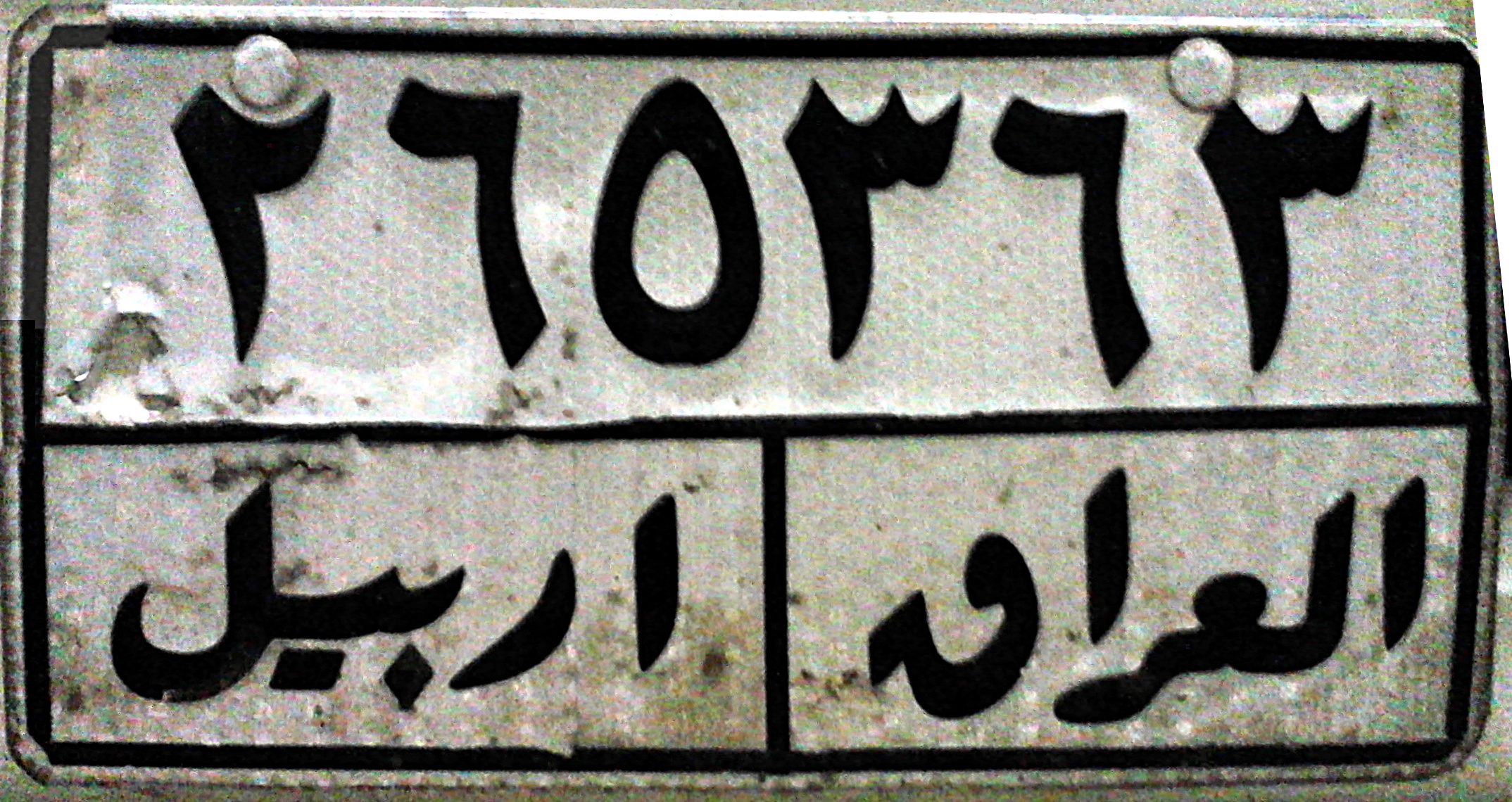
Iraqi private vehicle registration plate. (Erbil governorate)

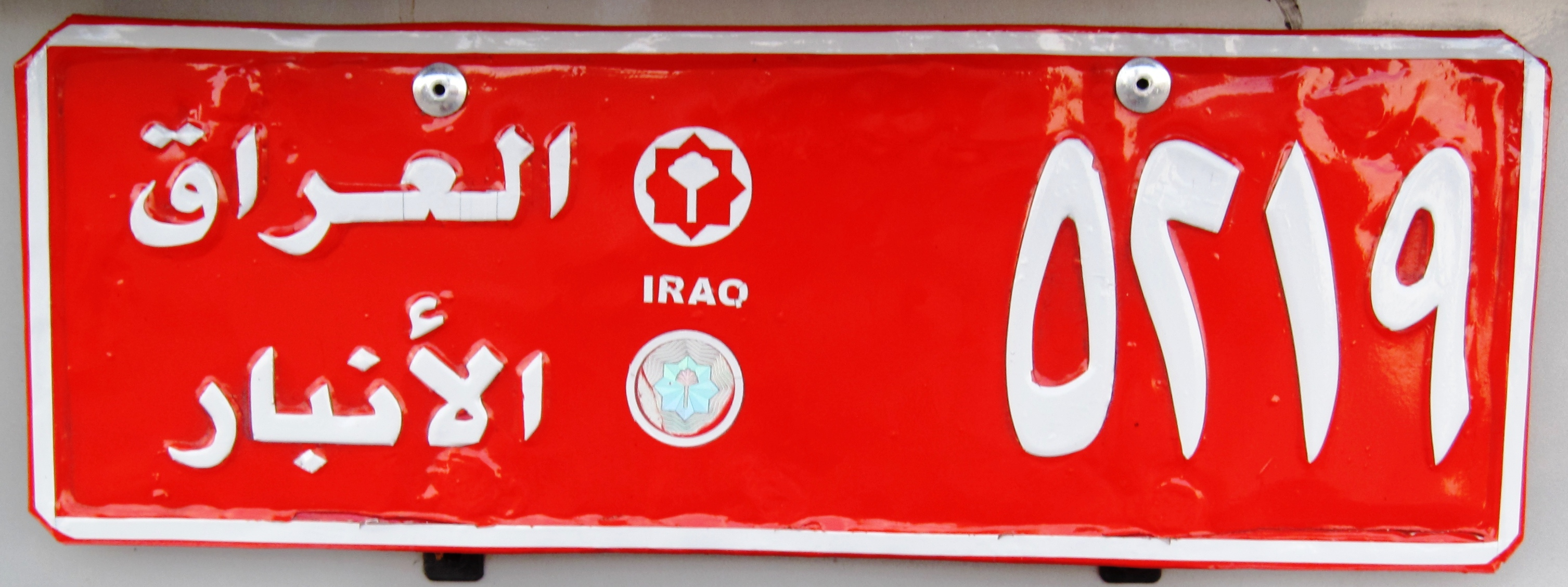
vehicle for hire. (Al Anbar Province)

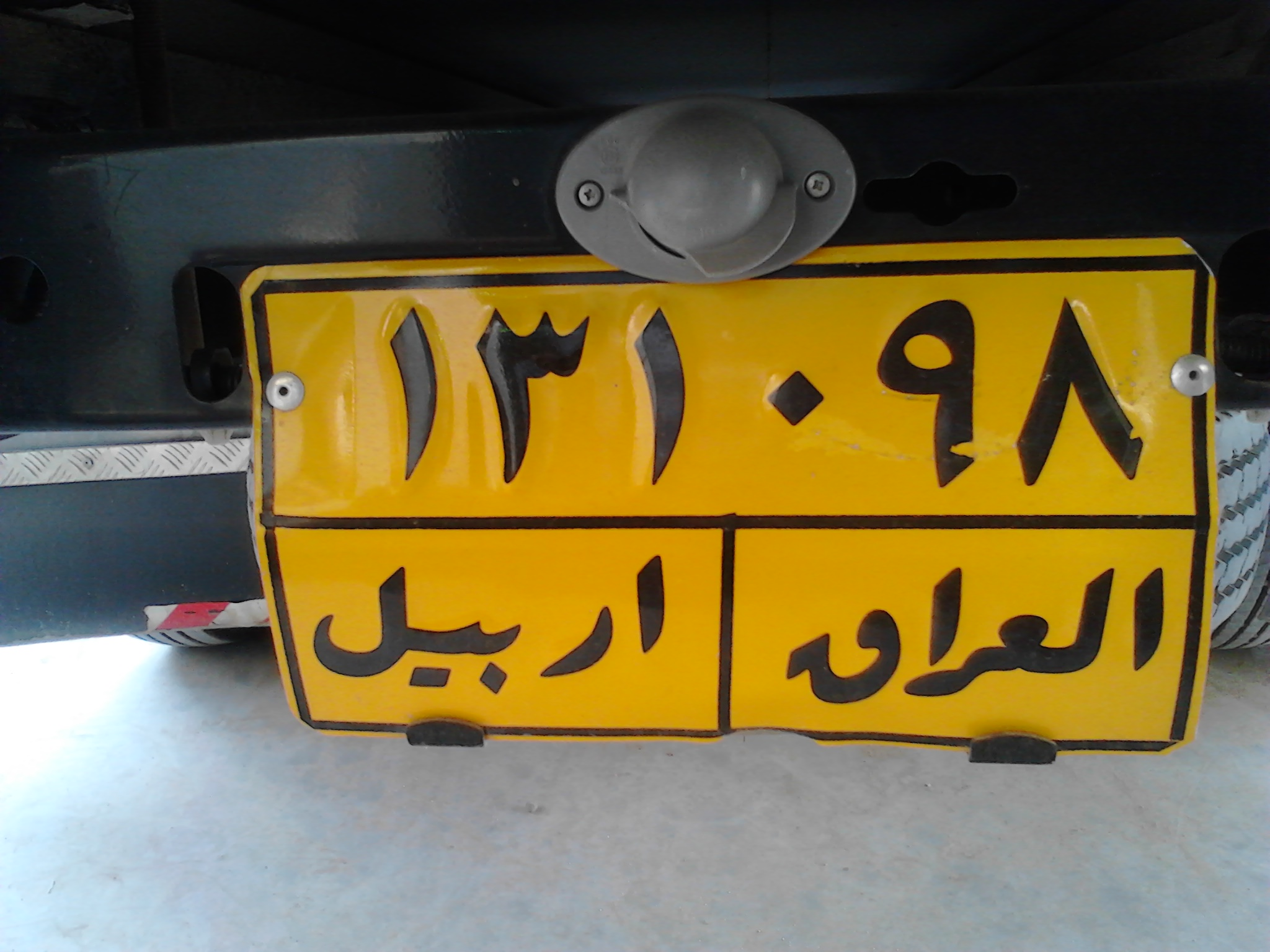
A yellow truck's plate. (Erbil governorate)

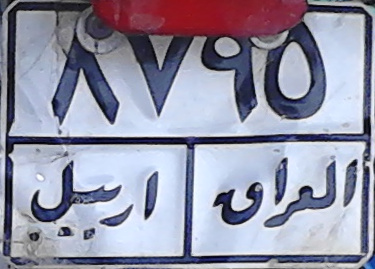
License plate for motorcycles (Erbil governorate)

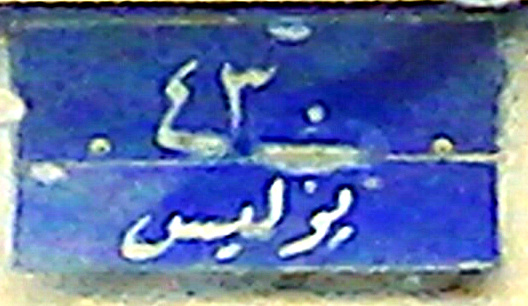
License plate used by police in Iraqi Kurdistan

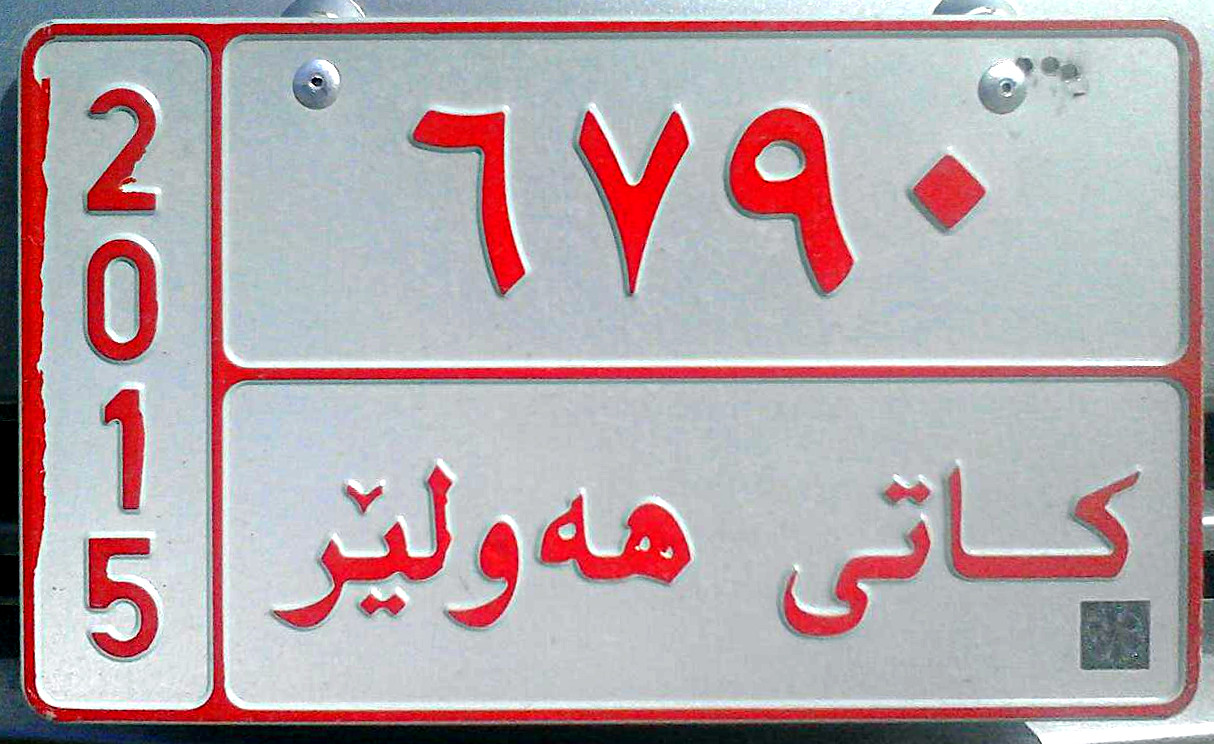
Temporary plates. (Erbil governorate)

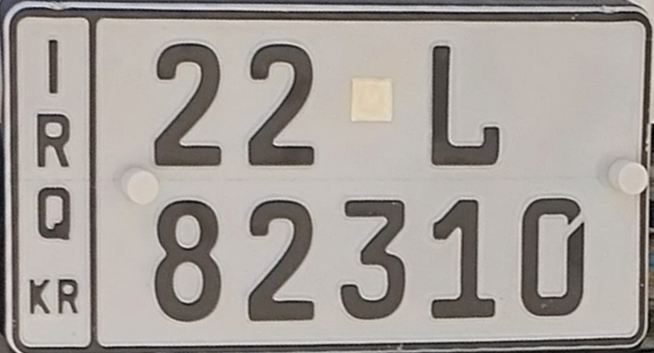
335x155mm sized license plate (Erbil governorate)

Temporary plates (Sulimaniyah governorate)
