= Halabja Martyrs Monument =

Martyrs Monument in Halabja, Kurdistan Region of Iraq

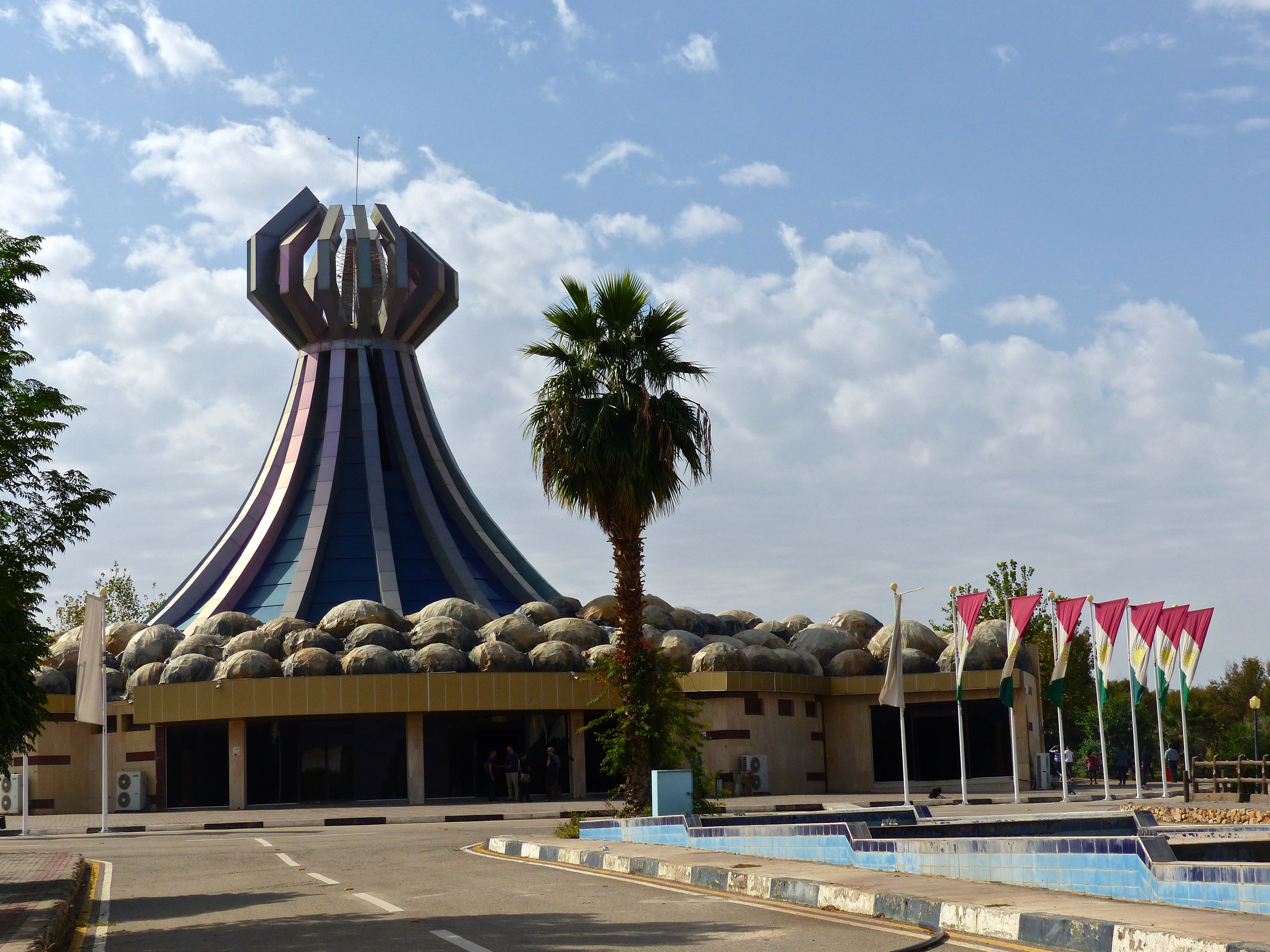
- The monument in 2018
- Type: Martyrs Memorial
- Location: Halabja, Kurdistan Region, Iraq
- Established: September 15, 2003

The Halabja Martyrs Monument is a commemorative site and museum located in Halabja, in the Kurdistan Region of Iraq. It was established on 15 September 2003 to honour the victims of the Halabja massacre, a chemical attack carried out on March 16, 1988 against Kurdish civilians.

== History ==
The memorial was constructed between 2002 and 2003. Opening in September 15, 2003, just six months after the U.S. invasion of Iraq in March 2003. U.S. Secretary of State Colin Powell attended the opening ceremony. The site is used for annual commemorations, especially on March 16, when residents and officials gather to remember the victims. Including people who lost family members the massacre.

=== 2006 unrest ===
In March 2006, unrest broke out in Halabja during the 18th anniversary of the massacre. Some 2,000 angry protestors stormed the monument. Angered by poor living conditions and lack of compensation for victims, they attacked and set fire to the Halabja memorial. Security forces opened fire as more demonstrators attempted to storm the site, resulting in the death of a protestor and injuries to several others. Kurda Ahmed, 17, was hit in the abdomen by a police rifle bullet, said eyewitnesses, who also alleged that a member of the security forces shot him again in the side, firing a pistol at close range. Ahmed died in Halabja hospital. Kurdish authorities alleged that Islamic militants were responsible for the violence.

In 2025, the Kurdistan Region’s Council of Ministers approved 600 million Iraqi dinars (around 400,000 USD) to renovate and expand the Monument. The project includes plans to update the existing structure, build an auditorium, and design a new monument on 47 dunams of land while preserving the site’s main features.

== Design ==

The museum inside displays artwork by Kurdish artists, along with photographs, artefacts, and poems expressing grief, as well as a list of the victims’ names. It also features life-sized models representing victims of the massacre.

== Other monuments ==
On April 19, 2014, a monument for the massacre was opened in the headquarters of the OPCW located in Netherlands, Hague. The ceremony was attended by the mayor of Hague, Jozias Johannes, Iraqi Kurdish officials and the head of the chemical weapons watchdog Ahmet Uzumcu. It is a replica version of the original version in Halabja.
