= Halabja District, Sulaymaniyah Governorate =

Halabja District
- District (formerly)
- Interactive map of Halabja District
- Country: Iraq
- Region: Kurdistan
- Governorate: Sulaymaniyah Governorate
- Time zone: UTC+3 (AST)

Halabja District was a district of the Sulaymaniyah Governorate, Kurdistan Region. In March 2014 the district was raised from district status to governorate status, becoming Halabja Governorate. Its nahiyahs (sub-districts) were elevated to become districts when the new governorate was formed.
