= Halabja Governorate =

Governorate of the Kurdistan Region, Iraq

- Governorate
- Kurdish: پارێزگای هەڵەبجە; Arabic: محافظة حلبجة
- Location of the Halabja Governorate (red) – in Iraq (red, beige & light grey) – in the Kurdistan Region (red & beige)

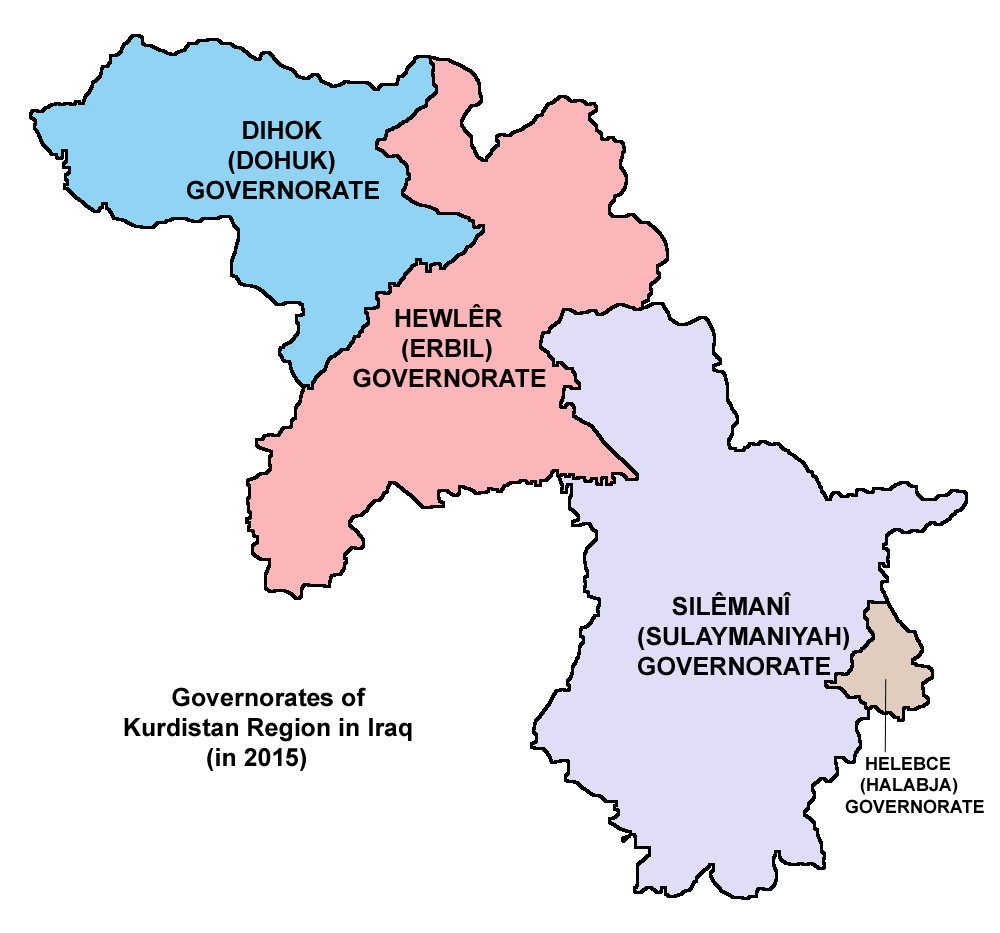
- Halabja Governorate within Kurdistan Region
- Coordinates: 35.2°N 46.0°E
- Country: Iraq
- Federal region: Kurdistan Region
- Capital: Halabja
- Established: 13 March 2014

Government
  - Governor: Nuxsha Nasih

Area
  - Total: 889 km^{2} (343 sq mi)

Population (2024 census)
  - Total: 113,926
  - Density: 128/km^{2} (332/sq mi)
- Time zone: UTC+3 (AST)

Halabja Governorate (Kurdish: پارێزگای ھەڵەبجە, romanized: Parêzgay Helebceyê, Arabic: محافظة حلبجة, romanized: Muḥāfaẓat Ḥalabja) is a governorate in the semi-autonomous region of Kurdistan Region in Iraq. The governorate was established in 2014, splitting off from Sulaymaniyah Governorate and becoming the fourth governorate in the Kurdistan Region of Iraq. Its capital is the city of Halabja. Halabja Governorate is the least populated governorate.

Although officially recognized by Kurdistan Regional Government, the Iraqi government had not officially recognized it until April 14th 2025 due to postponing of the hearing regarding its status multiple times by the Council of Representatives of Iraq, which is the only legislature in Iraq capable of declaring it as such.

On April 14, 2025, the Iraqi government officially recognized Halabja as its 19th province of Iraq. The Kurdistan Region has also recognized it as the 4th Governorate of the Kurdistan Region before.

== History ==
The Kurdish Parliament first agreed to turn Halabja District into a province in 1999, but it was not enacted at the time. The Kurdistan Region approved of it becoming a governorate in June 2013. Iraq's Council of Ministers approved a bill on 31 December 2013 to enable it. The Iraqi Parliament had to pass the bill but failed to do so. However, the Speaker of the house, Osama Nujaifi, advised that Kurdistan had the power to make Halabja a province. On 13 March 2014, Nechirvan Barzani, Prime Minister of Kurdistan, signed the decision of making Halabja district the fourth governorate of Kurdistan Region; that happened just three days before the remembrance of Halabja chemical attack, which happened on 16 March 1988. On March 16, 2014, Kurdistan Region President Masoud Barzani signed a regional directive to promote Halabja from district status to a province. The Kurdish Parliament passed a bill in February 2015 to establish the legal framework for selecting a provincial council and a governor. As of December 2015, the Iraqi Parliament had not yet officially recognised the province, apparently because of issues with budgeting finance for it. In August 2018, the then Iraqi Interior Minister, Qasim al-Araji, approved authorization for the opening of federal offices that would issue passports, national ID cards, and other civil documents under its own name. On the 13th of March 2023, the Iraqi council of ministers recognised Halabja as an official governorate of Iraq, but the council of representatives delayed hearing for this bill numerous times. The hearing for the bill was eventually passed on April 14th 2025, officially recognizing the province.

== Districts ==
Halabja comprises the central district, Halabja, and four other districts, Sîrwan, Xurmal, Biyare and Bamo. Three other districts of the Sulaymaniyah Governorate had the option of joining the province, but decided against it.
