= Halabja =

City in Kurdistan Region, Iraq

Halabja هەڵەبجە
- City
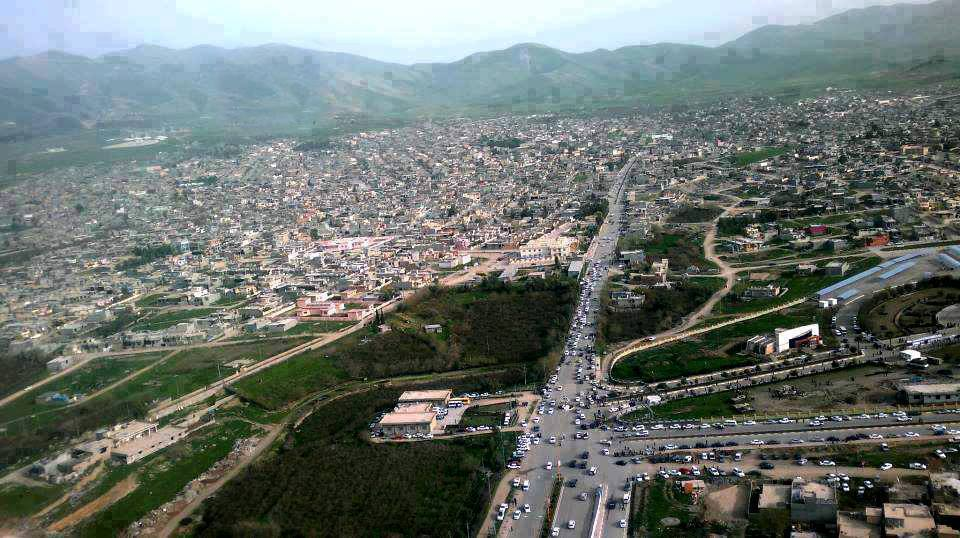
- Halabja city

- Halabja in Iraq Halabja (Iraq)
- Coordinates: 35°11′11″N 45°58′26″E
- Country: Iraq
- Autonomous region: Kurdistan Region
- Governorate: Halabja
- Established: 1650 BC

Government
  - Mayor: Nuxsha Nasih

Area
  - Total: 1,600 km^{2} (620 sq mi)
- Elevation: 900 m (3,000 ft)

Population (2018)
  - Total: 245,700
- Time zone: UTC+3

Halabja (هەڵەبجە) is a city in the Kurdistan Region of Iraq and the capital of Halabja Governorate, located about 240 km (150 mi) northeast of Baghdad and 14 km (9 mi) from the Iranian border.

The city lies at the base of what is often referred to as the greater Hewraman region stretching across the Iran–Iraq border. Halabja is surrounded by Hawraman and Shnrwe range in the northeast, Balambo range in the south and Sirwan river in the west. The Kurds in the city of Halabja generally speak only the Sorani dialect of Kurdish, but some residents of the surrounding villages speak the Hewrami dialect.

== History ==
=== Early history ===
Halabja has a long history, as proven by excavations at nearby archaeological sites like Bakr Awa. The cemetery includes the tombs of several historical figures, such as Ahmed Mukhtar Jaff, Tayar Bag Jaff and Adila Khanim. The ancient city-kingdom of Lullubi is thought to be located below or nearby. In August 2009, three 17th-century tombs were discovered in the Ababile district of the town.

This suggests that the town is somewhat older than indicated by some sources, which claim that it was built by the Ottoman Empire at about 1850. However, modern developments date from the early 20th century. The post office opened in 1924 and the first school opened the following year. The Qaysari Pasha and Hamid Bag bazaars were built-in 1932. Electricity did not reach the city until 1940.

At the beginning of the 20th century, there were many British soldiers stationed in Halabja. During World War I, Adela Khanum saved the lives of several British soldiers, resulting in the British honoring her with the title Khan Bahadur, Princess of the Brave. She was also responsible for the building of a new prison, setting up a court of justice, of which she was the first president and building a new bazaar.

Towards the end of Kurdish revolt of 1919, Halajba became the final rebel holdout. On 28 June 1919, British colonial troops occupied the city, defeating the rebellion and ending the Kurdish state.

During the Al-Anfal campaign of the Iraqi Government, which took place between March 1987 and May 1989, the neighborhoods Kani Ashqan and Mordana were erased in May 1987 as a reprisal for the support of the Peshmerga. But Halabja suffered much more during the Al-Anfal campaign, in which Saddam Hussein violently suppressed Kurdish revolts during the Iran–Iraq War.

=== Chemical attack ===
The Kurdish peshmerga guerrillas, supported by Iran, captured Halabja in the final phase of the Iran–Iraq War. At 11:00 AM, On March 16, 1988, after two days of conventional artillery attacks, Iraqi planes dropped gas canisters on the town. The town and surrounding district were attacked with bombs, artillery fire and chemical weapons, the last of which proved most devastating. At least 5,000 people died as an immediate result of the chemical attack and it is estimated that a further 7,000 people were injured or suffered long-term illness. Most of the victims of the attack on the town of Halabja were Kurdish civilians.

The attack is believed to have included the nerve agents Tabun, Sarin and VX, as well as mustard gas. However, according to former senior CIA analyst Stephen C. Pelletiere, Iraq did not have the nerve agent used in the attack but did have mustard gas which was used in the Iran–Iraq War. An interdisciplinary scientific study from 2019, after more than three decades, shows that the chemical attacks on Halabja have long-term biological, psychological and social effects on the survivors. The authors, Faraidoun Moradi, Mia Söderberg, Fazil Moradi and others conclude: "The post-exposure somatic and psychosocial effects such as respiratory symptoms of CWA are a plausible contributors to poor general health and quality of life among survivors. We conclude that multidisciplinary interventions are needed to tackle the biopsychosocial complications in survivors of SM exposure to minimize further health damage in the future, as well as to promote their health-related quality of life."

It is occasionally suggested that cyanide was also included among these chemical weapons, though this assertion has been cast into doubt, as cyanide is a natural byproduct of impure Tabun.

Before the war ended the Iraqis moved in on the ground and completely destroyed the town. In March 2010, the Iraqi High Criminal Court recognized the Halabja massacre as genocide; the decision was welcomed by the Kurdistan Regional Government.

=== Kurdish autonomy ===
In the mountains to the west of Halabja, a militant Islamist group, Ansar al-Islam, occupied a small enclave in the period of 2000–2003. The area was overrun by Peshmerga forces from the Patriotic Union of Kurdistan (PUK), with U.S. air support, at the beginning of the 2003 US invasion of Iraq. The town has remained a center of Islamism in the Kurdistan region, however.

Just before Kurds gained some autonomy over the Iraqi Kurdistan region in 1991, which included Halabja, a new town was set up where some former Kurdish refugees later relocated. The new town called Halabja Taza (or New Halabja) today has an estimated 9,000 homes.

The Kurdistan Regional Government made some concentrated reconstruction efforts after 2003 in the old town and began rebuilding some of the bombed-out homes in Halabja and paving new roads. A memorial was also constructed for the victims of the chemical attacks. However, residents of Halabja have complained about the continued lack of basic services and necessities.

On the 2006 anniversary of the gas attack, violent demonstrations erupted in Halabja. An estimated 7,000 demonstrators protested against priorities in reconstruction, claiming that officials were not sincerely addressing the problems of the gas attack victims. Roadblocks were set up and the Halabja Martyrs Monument was set afire. Police fired at protesters killing one 14-year-old boy and wounding many others.

=== Modern times ===
In 2008, plans were announced to construct an international airport for the city.

On 12 November 2017 at 21:18 local time, an earthquake struck approximately 32 kilometres (20 mi) south-southwest of Halabja.

== Climate ==
Halabja has a hot-summer Mediterranean climate (Csa) with very hot summers and cool wet winters.

Climate data for Halabja
Month	Jan	Feb	Mar	Apr	May	Jun	Jul	Aug	Sep	Oct	Nov	Dec	Year
Mean daily maximum °C (°F)	9.6 (49.3)	11.8 (53.2)	16.9 (62.4)	22.0 (71.6)	29.5 (85.1)	35.8 (96.4)	39.6 (103.3)	39.2 (102.6)	35.0 (95.0)	28.4 (83.1)	19.7 (67.5)	12.5 (54.5)	25.0 (77.0)
Daily mean °C (°F)	4.8 (40.6)	6.6 (43.9)	11.2 (52.2)	15.8 (60.4)	22.0 (71.6)	27.4 (81.3)	31.2 (88.2)	30.8 (87.4)	26.4 (79.5)	20.5 (68.9)	13.3 (55.9)	7.3 (45.1)	18.1 (64.6)
Mean daily minimum °C (°F)	0.1 (32.2)	1.4 (34.5)	5.6 (42.1)	9.7 (49.5)	14.5 (58.1)	19.0 (66.2)	22.8 (73.0)	22.5 (72.5)	17.9 (64.2)	12.7 (54.9)	7.0 (44.6)	2.2 (36.0)	11.3 (52.3)
Average precipitation mm (inches)	144 (5.7)	146 (5.7)	132 (5.2)	85 (3.3)	35 (1.4)	0 (0)	0 (0)	0 (0)	0 (0)	28 (1.1)	79 (3.1)	124 (4.9)	773 (30.4)

== See also ==
- Halabja Martyrs Monument
- Dujail
- Human rights in Saddam Hussein's Iraq
- Operation Red Dawn
- Trial of Saddam Hussein
