= Halabja massacre =

1988 chemical attack in Iraqi Kurdistan

- Part of the Anfal campaign of the Iraqi–Kurdish conflict and Iran–Iraq War
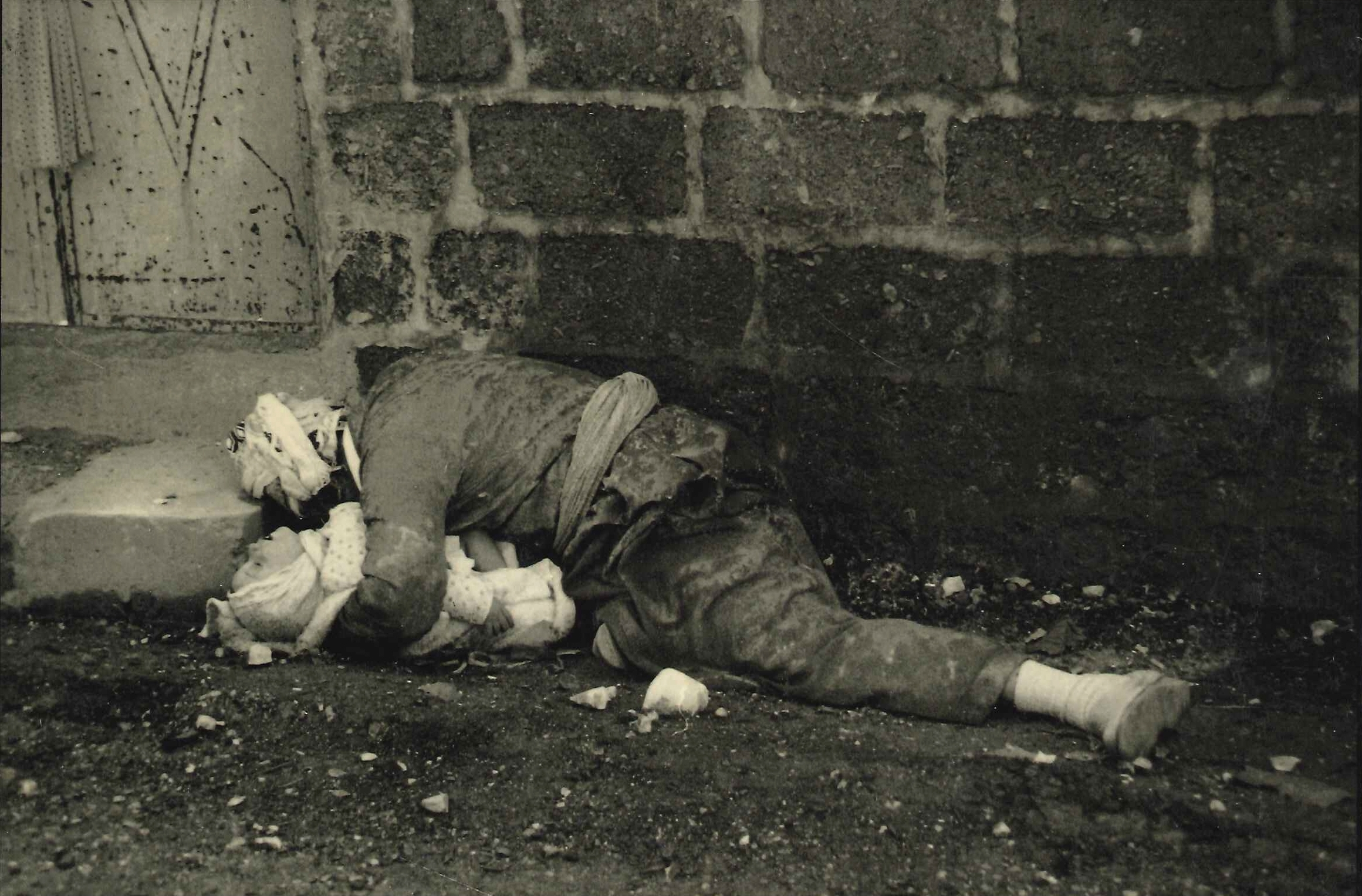
- Photograph of the corpses of Omer Khawar and his infant by Mehdi Jamshidi, one of the most well-known photographs of the massacre

- Location within Iraq
- Native name: کیمیابارانی ھەڵەبجە
- Location: Halabja, Iraq
- Date: 16 March 1988
- Target: Kurdish civilians, Peshmerga, and Iranian Armed Forces
- Attack type: Chemical attack, genocidal massacre, war crime
- Weapons: Mustard gas, tabun, sarin, VX
- Deaths: 3,200–5,000
- Injuries: 7,000–10,000
- Perpetrator: Iraqi government
- Motive: Anti-Kurdish sentiment
- Convicted: Ali Hassan al-Majid

The Halabja massacre (Kurdish: کیمیابارانی ھەڵەبجە, romanized: Kêmyabarana Helebce) took place in Iraqi Kurdistan on 16 March 1988, when thousands of Kurds were killed by a large-scale Iraqi chemical attack. A targeted attack in Halabja, it was carried out during the Anfal campaign, which was led by Iraqi military officer Ali Hassan al-Majid. Two days before the attack, the city had been captured by Iran as part of Operation Zafar 7 of the Iran–Iraq War. Following the incident, the United Nations launched an investigation and concluded that mustard gas as well as unidentified nerve agents had been used against Kurdish civilians. The BBC later reported that a mixture of mustard, tabun, sarin, and VX, was used. The United States Defense Intelligence Agency initially blamed Iran for the attack, though the majority of evidence later revealed that Iraq had used the chemical weapons to bolster an ongoing military offensive against Iran, pro-Iranian Kurdish fighters, and ordinary Halabja residents.

To date, the Halabja massacre remains the largest chemical weapons attack directed against a civilian-populated region in human history, killing between 3,200 and 5,000 people and injuring 7,000 to 10,000 more. Preliminary results from surveys of the affected areas showed increased rates of cancer and birth defects in the years since the attack took place.

In 2010, the Supreme Iraqi Criminal Tribunal officially defined the Halabja chemical attack as a genocidal massacre against the Kurdish people during the time of Iraqi president Saddam Hussein. That same year, it was also formally condemned by the Parliament of Canada, which classified it as a crime against humanity. Al-Majid, who was captured during the 2003 invasion of Iraq, was put on trial and found guilty of ordering the attack; he was sentenced to death in June 2007 and executed by hanging in January 2010.

== Background ==
Northern Iraq was an area of general unrest during the early stage of the Iran–Iraq War, with the Kurdistan Democratic Party (KDP) and Patriotic Union of Kurdistan (PUK) militias joining forces, with Iranian support, in 1982 and 1983, respectively. From 1985, the Iraqi Ba'athist government under Saddam Hussein decided to eradicate pockets of Kurdish insurgents in the north and strike down the peshmerga rebels by all means possible, including large-scale punishment of civilians and the use of chemical weapons. The Halabja event was also part of Iraqi efforts to counter-attack Kurdish and Iranian forces in the final stages of Operation Zafar 7.

== Chemical attack ==
The five-hour attack began in the evening of 16 March 1988. Following a series of indiscriminate conventional (rocket and napalm) attacks, Iraqi Mig and Mirage aircraft began dropping chemical bombs on Halabja's residential areas, far from the besieged Iraqi army base on the outskirts of the town. According to regional Kurdish rebel commanders, Iraqi aircraft, coordinated by helicopters, conducted up to 14 bombings in sorties of seven to eight planes each. Eyewitnesses told of clouds of white, black and then yellow smoke billowing upward and rising as a column about 150 feet (50 m) in the air.

It was a beautiful spring day. As the clock approached 11:00 in the morning, I felt a strange sensation; my heart convulsed as if it were telling me that we were on the verge of a major calamity. Within minutes, artillery rounds began to explode in Halabja and planes began dropping bombs on the town. The bombing was concentrated on the northern neighborhoods, so we ran and hid in our basement. At 2 o'clock in the afternoon, as the intensity of the bombing wound down, I carefully sneaked out of the basement to the kitchen and carried food to my family. When the bombing stopped, we began to hear noises that sounded like metal pieces falling on the ground. But I didn’t find an explanation.

I saw things that I won't forget for as long as I live. It started with a loud strange noise that sounded like bombs exploding, and a man came running into our house, shouting, 'Gas! Gas!' We hurried into our car and closed its windows. I think the car was rolling over the bodies of innocent people. I saw people lying on the ground, vomiting a green-colored liquid, while others became hysterical and began laughing loudly before falling motionless onto the ground. Later, I smelled an aroma that reminded me of apples and I lost consciousness. When I awoke, there were hundreds of bodies scattered around me. After that I took shelter again in a nearby basement and the area was engulfed by an ugly smell. It was similar to rotting garbage, but then it changed to a sweet smell similar to that of apples. Then I smelled something that was like eggs.

When you hear people shouting the words 'gas' or 'chemicals'—and you hear those shouts spreading among the people—that is when terror begins to take hold, especially among the children and the women. Your loved ones, your friends, you see them walking and then falling like leaves to the ground. It is a situation that cannot be described—birds began falling from their nests; then other animals, then humans. It was total annihilation. Whoever was able to walk out of the town, left on foot. Whoever had a car, left by car. But whoever had too many children to carry on their shoulders, they stayed in the town and succumbed to the gas.

Survivors said the gas at first smelled of sweet apples and reported that people "died in a number of ways, suggesting a combination of toxic chemicals." Citing an interview with a university student who survived the attack, the international NGO, Human Rights Watch, reported that "some [victims] 'just dropped dead'. Others 'died of laughing.' Others took a few minutes to die, first 'burning and blistering' or 'coughing up green vomit'". "Those who were in the thick of the 'death cloud' died in suspended animation" according to Dlawer Ala'Aldeen of Nottingham University, who collected detailed data between 1987 and 1988, including numbers, places and types of chemical weapon attacks across Iraqi Kurdistan. Many were injured or perished in the panic that followed the attack, especially those who were blinded by the chemicals.

"Iranian physicians reported that victims of the chemical attacks on Halabja showed characteristic symptoms of cyanide poisoning," while other reports indicated substantial quantities of mustard gas and other chemical weapons were used. Most of the wounded taken to hospitals in the Iranian capital Tehran were suffering from mustard gas exposure. A United Nations (UN) medical investigation concluded that mustard gas was used in the attack, along with unidentified nerve agents; the UN's investigator was "unable to obtain any definitive information about the [reported] use of hydrocyanic gas as an aggressive chemical." It is generally accepted that "a lethal cocktail of mustard gas and the nerve agents Tabun, Sarin and VX" was used, as reported by the BBC. Prior to the Halabja incident there were at least 21 documented smaller-scale chemical attacks against Iraqi Kurds, none of which prompted any serious response from the international community.

== Aftermath ==
=== Discovery and response ===
The first images after the attack were taken by Iranian journalists who later spread the pictures in Iranian newspapers. Footage taken by a British ITN camera crew, airlifted by the Iranians, was also shown worldwide via news programmes. Some of those first pictures were taken by Iranian photographer Kaveh Golestan, who described the scene to Guy Dinmore of the Financial Times. He was about 8 kilometres (5.0 mi) outside Halabja with a military helicopter when the Iraqi MiG-23 fighter-bombers flew in. He said "it was not as big as a nuclear mushroom cloud, but several smaller ones: thick smoke." Golestan was shocked by the scenes on his arrival in the town, though he had seen gas attacks before at the front lines:

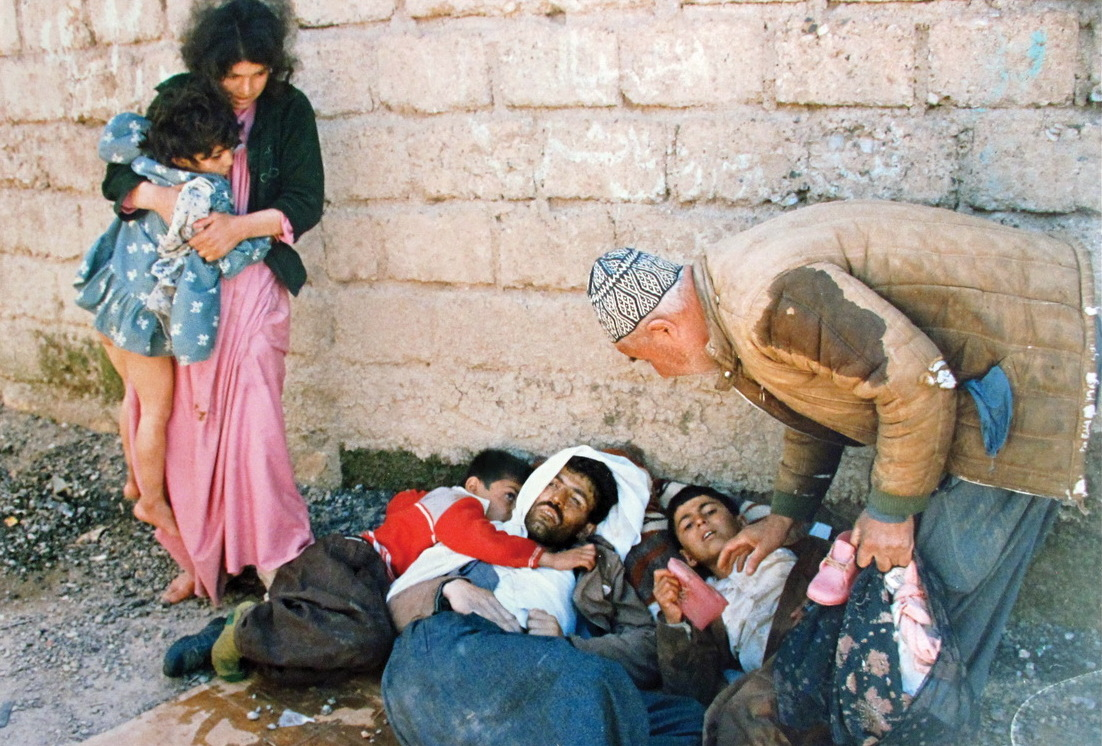
Victims of the attack

It was life frozen. Life had stopped, like watching a film and suddenly it hangs on one frame. It was a new kind of death to me. (…) The aftermath was worse. Victims were still being brought in. Some villagers came to our chopper. They had 15 or 16 beautiful children, begging us to take them to hospital. So all the press sat there and we were each handed a child to carry. As we took off, fluid came out of my little girl's mouth and she died in my arms.

The Iraqi government did not publicly comment on the use of chemical weapons at Halabja until 23 March, and early statements by Iraqi officials on the matter were inconsistent. Although Iraq ultimately denied responsibility for the attack and blamed it on Iran, its initial silence, as well as the fact that Halabja was never a major part of Iraq's wartime propaganda campaign against Iran, raises questions about the sincerity of this deflection.

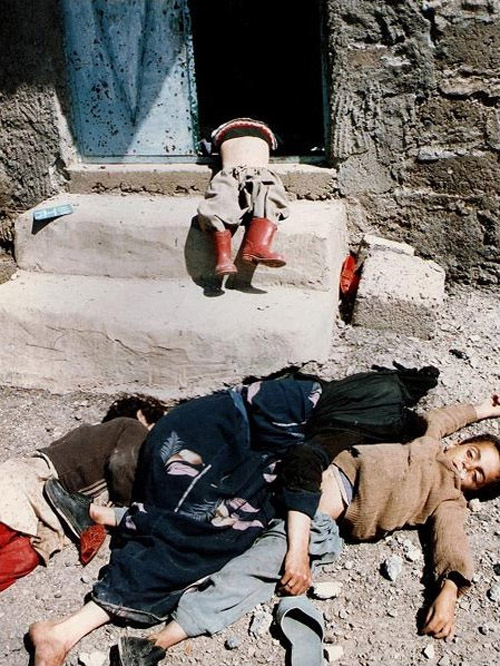
Bodies of a woman and children

International response at the time was muted. The United States (U.S.) government and its intelligence agencies suggested that Kurdish civilians had not been deliberately targeted, and attempted to place responsibility for the attack on Iran. The U.S. Defense Intelligence Agency and Central Intelligence Agency analyst Stephen C. Pelletiere claimed at the time that Iran was responsible for the gassing, an allegation which Pelletiere repeated in a 2003 op-ed in The New York Times. However, these claims were subsequently discredited. A briefing paper produced by the British Foreign and Commonwealth Office about how the British government should respond to the massacre, and whether or not economic sanctions should be imposed, came to the following conclusion: "We believe it better to maintain a dialogue with others if we want to influence their actions. Punitive measures such as unilateral sanctions would not be effective in changing Iraq's behaviour over chemical weapons, and would damage British interests to no avail." According to Tony Benn, the issue was raised in Parliament, but he was told that "Saddam was an ally". Joost Hiltermann states that Iraq took the U.S. "disinformation" about Halabja as "another green light ... to gather up and methodically kill tens of thousands of Kurds" over the course of the ensuing Anfal campaign, which continued until September 1988. In Hiltermann's analysis, the Anfal campaign "surely was not a US policy objective; nevertheless, it resulted directly from failing to call the Iraqis to a halt [after Halabja]."

In response to further Iraqi chemical attacks on Kurdish civilians after the August 1988 ceasefire with Iran, U.S. senators Claiborne Pell and Jesse Helms called for comprehensive economic sanctions against Iraq, including an oil embargo and severe limitations on the export of dual-use technology. Although the ensuing legislation passed in the U.S. Senate, it faced strong opposition within the House of Representatives and did not become law. In a rare rebuke, United States Secretary of State George Shultz condemned Iraq's "unjustified and abhorrent" attacks, which Shultz's assistant Charles E. Redman characterized as "unacceptable to the civilized world." Even after these pronouncements, however, the State Department advised against sanctions.

Iraqi government documents dating from 16 March 1988 to several weeks later refer to "a firm escalation of military might and cruelty [in Halabja]," "the bombing by our planes and our artillery on the area of Halabja and Khurmal, [killing] approximately 2,000 enemy forces of the Persians and Iranian agents [the PUK]," the "recent attack on Halabja with special ammunition," and, in one case, explicitly refer to "the Iraqi chemical attack on Halabja." A 20 March 1988 Iraqi memorandum "placed the casualty figures 'as a result of the chemical attack' as 900–1,000 'killed and a large number wounded' near Halabjah and some 2,500 in the city itself. These numbers included 'Khomeini guard, saboteurs, and the rest were civilians.'" An Iraqi pilot explained in 2003 that the attack was motivated, in part, by the Iraqi perception that Kurdish collaboration with invading Iranian soldiers constituted "high treason."

=== Legal framework of Iraqi chemical warfare ===
Iraq was a signatory of the 1925 Geneva Protocol, which prohibits "the use in war of asphyxiating, poisonous or other gases, and of all analogous liquids materials or devices". However, legal experts stated that such use was only applicable between signatory states and not against its own nationals, noting the Protocol's sentence "That the High Contracting Parties...agree to be bound as between themselves according to the terms of this declaration." In other words, the Iraqi chemical attacks against Iran was a war crime, but not against its own population.

Such legality was reinforced when the United Nations Security Council condemned Iraq's use of chemical weapons against Iran in Resolutions 612 and 620, while leaving out any reference of the same use against its own nationals. The Council was also at the time preoccupied with trying to get Iraq and Iran to accept Resolution 598 (which called for a ceasefire between the two nations), and restrained by concerns about Iraq's sovereignty in what was regarded as an 'internal affair'.

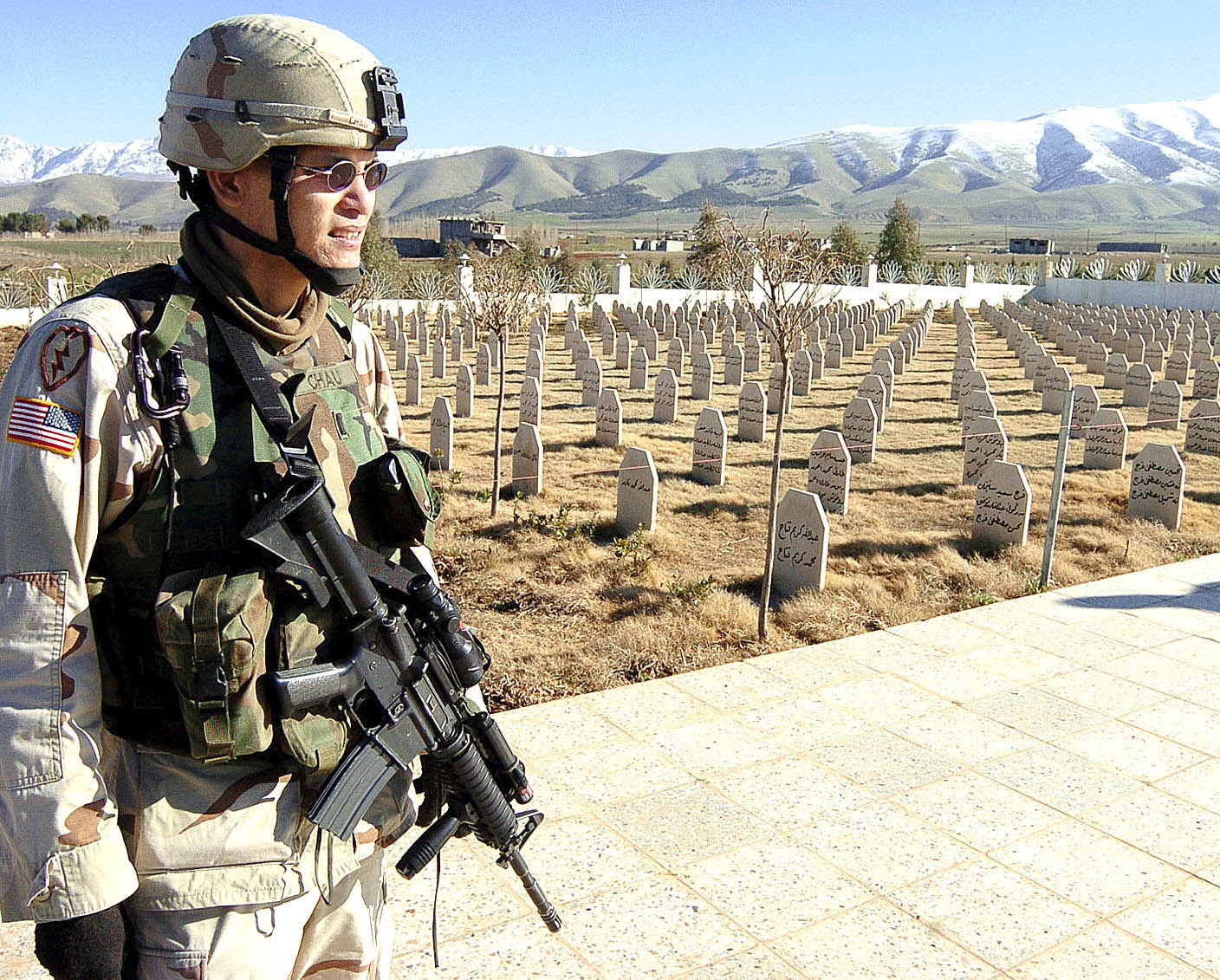
A First Lieutenant of the U.S. 25th Infantry Division patrolling a local cemetery for some 1,500 victims in February 2005

=== Destruction and partial restoration of Halabja ===
Survivors assisted by peshmerga and Iranians hastily buried most of the dead in makeshift mass graves. After Halabja was retaken from Iranian and Kurdish rebel forces, Iraqi troops in NBC suits came to Halabja to study the effectiveness of their weapons and attacks. The town, still littered with unburied dead, was then systematically razed by Iraqi forces using bulldozers and explosives. The Japanese government financed a $70 million project to provide access to safe drinking water in response to this. In the meanwhile, an Iraqi high-ranking authority officially confessed in a meeting with Javier Pérez de Cuéllar, the Secretary-General of the United Nations for the utilization of chemical weapons by Iraq.

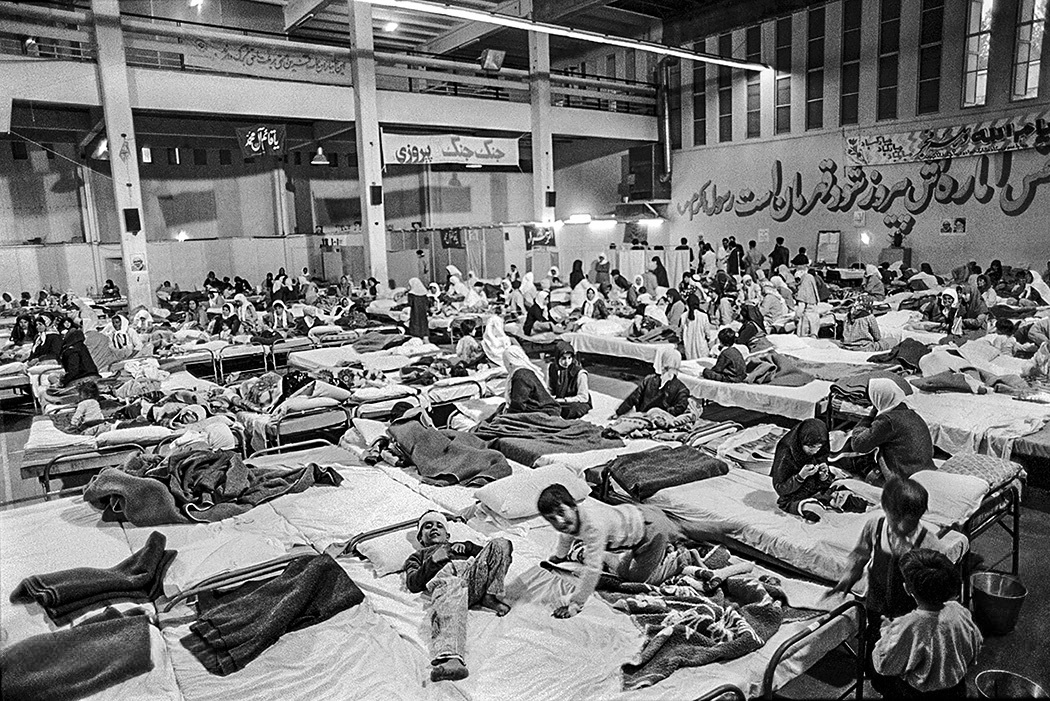
Treatment of survivors at the Iran Khodro Stadium in Karaj, April 1988.

=== Medical and genetic consequences ===
Ten years later, in 1998, at least 700 people were still being treated for the severe after effects of the attack and 500 of them were judged to be critically ill, even as "the most severe cases may already have died." In surveys by local doctors, a higher percentage of medical disorders, miscarriages (outnumbering live births and 14 times higher than normal), colon cancer (10 times higher than normal), and heart diseases (quadrupled between 1990 and 1996) were found in Halabja compared to Chamchamal. Additionally, "other cancers, respiratory ailments, skin and eye problems, fertility and reproductive disorders are measurably higher in Halabja and other areas caught in chemical attacks." Some of those who survived the attack or were apparently injured only lightly at the time later developed medical problems doctors believe stemmed from the chemicals, and there are concerns that the attack may be having a lasting genetic impact on the Kurdish population, as preliminary surveys showed increased rates of birth defects.

Some reports indicated that "survivors of this particular attack have permanent injuries, including burns, and some exhibit symptoms of neurological damage, although this cannot yet be adequately confirmed."

In addition to human casualties and loss of life, animals, plants, wild life and the entire environment were severely affected and took years to recover

=== Trials of Saddam and 'Chemical Ali' ===
Saddam Hussein was not charged by the Iraqi Special Tribunal for crimes against humanity based on the events at Halabja. However, Iraqi prosecutors had "500 documented baskets of crimes during the Hussein regime" and Hussein was condemned to death based on just one case, the 1982 Dujail Massacre. Among several documents revealed during the trial of Saddam Hussein, one was a 1987 memo from Iraq's military intelligence seeking permission from the president's office to use mustard gas and the nerve agents sarin and tabun against Kurds. A second document said in reply that Saddam had ordered military intelligence to study the possibility of a "sudden strike" using such weapons against Iranian and Kurdish forces. An internal memo written by military intelligence confirmed it had received approval from the president's office for a strike using "special ammunition" and emphasized that no strike would be launched without first informing the president. Saddam himself told the court: "In relation to Iran, if any military or civil official claims that Saddam gave orders to use either conventional or special ammunition, which as explained is chemical, I will take responsibility with honor. But I will discuss any act committed against our people and any Iraqi citizen, whether Arab or Kurdish. I don't accept any insult to my principles or to me personally." Kurdish survivors had no doubt Saddam was personally responsible and were disappointed he was being tried only over the killings in Dujail. Saddam was executed by hanging on 30 December 2006.

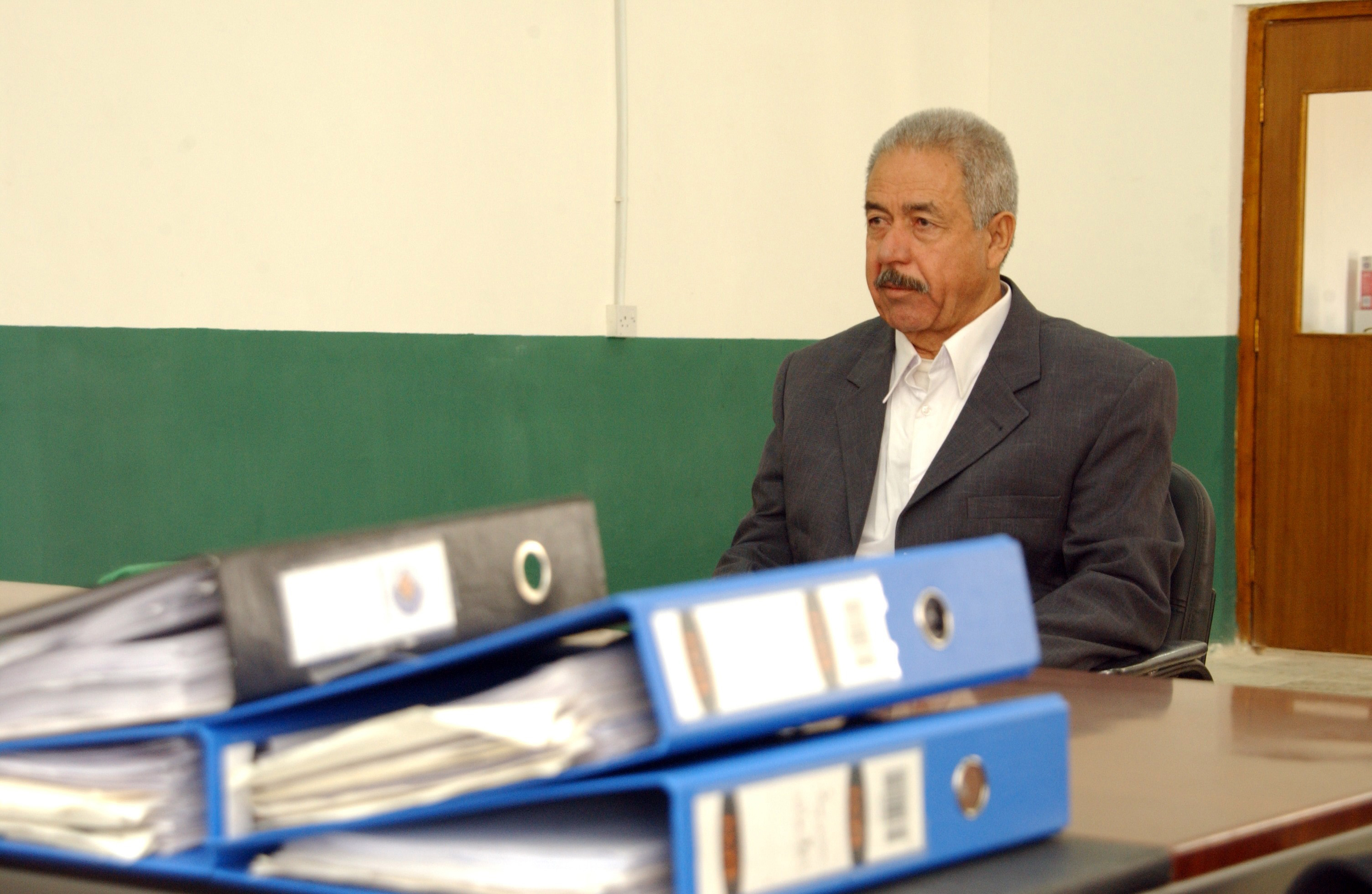
Ali Hassan al-Majid "Chemical Ali" during an investigative hearing in 2004

Saddam's cousin Ali Hassan al-Majid (who commanded Iraqi forces in northern Iraq during that period, which earned him a nickname of 'Chemical Ali') was condemned to death by hanging by an Iraqi court in January 2010, after being found guilty of orchestrating the Halabja massacre. Al-Majid was first sentenced to hang in 2007 for his role in a 1988 military campaign against ethnic Kurds, codenamed Anfal, and in 2008 he also twice received a death sentence for his crimes against the Iraqi Shia Muslims, in particular for his role in crushing the 1991 uprisings in southern Iraq and his involvement in the 1999 killings in the Sadr City district of Baghdad (then called Saddam City). Al-Majid did not express remorse at his trials, stating his actions were in the interests of Iraqi security. He was executed by hanging on 25 January 2010. Among many other captured Iraqi government documents proving Iraqi responsibility for the attack, there is a recording of al-Majid boasting about the Kurds: "I will kill them all with chemical weapons. Who is going to say anything? The international community? Fuck the international community and those who listen to them!"

In 2019, the Kurdistan Regional Government opened a special hospital in Halabja dedicated to victims of the 1988 chemical attack. The facility was funded with over 12 million US dollars and staffed by 275 medical workers trained to treat patients suffering long-term effects of exposure to chemical weapons. In 2026, the Kurdistan Regional Government announced funding of nearly 500 million Iraqi dinars for healthcare services in Halabja, most of which will fund the facility built to treat victims.

== International sources for technology and chemical precursors ==
The know-how and material for developing chemical weapons were obtained by Saddam's regime from foreign sources. Most precursors for chemical weapons production came from Singapore (4,515 tons), the Netherlands (4,261 tons), Egypt (2,400 tons), India (2,343 tons), and West Germany (1,027 tons). One Indian company, Exomet Plastics, sent 2,292 tons of precursor chemicals to Iraq. Singapore-based firm Kim Al-Khaleej, affiliated to the United Arab Emirates, supplied more than 4,500 tons of VX, sarin and mustard gas precursors and production equipment to Iraq. Dieter Backfisch, managing director of West German company Karl Kolb GmbH, was quoted by saying in 1989 that "for people in Germany poison gas is something quite terrible, but this does not worry customers abroad."

The 2002 International Crisis Group (ICG) no. 136 "Arming Saddam: The Yugoslav Connection" concludes it was "tacit approval" by many world governments that led to the Iraqi regime being armed with weapons of mass destruction, despite sanctions, because of the ongoing Iranian conflict. Among the dual-use exports provided to Iraq from American companies such as Alcolac International and Phillips was thiodiglycol, a substance which can also be used to manufacture mustard gas, according to leaked portions of Iraq's "full, final and complete" disclosure of the sources for its weapons programs. The dual-use exports from U.S. companies to Iraq was enabled by a Reagan administration policy that removed Iraq from the State Department's list of State Sponsors of Terrorism. Alcolac was named as a defendant in the Aziz v. Iraq case, but the case was eventually dismissed (Case No. 1:09-cv-00869-MJG). Both companies have since undergone reorganization. Phillips, once a subsidiary of Phillips Petroleum is now part of ConocoPhillips, an American oil and discount fossil fuel company. Alcolac International has since dissolved and reformed as Alcolac Inc.

On 23 December 2005, a Dutch court sentenced Frans van Anraat, a businessman who bought chemicals on the world market and sold them to Saddam's regime, to 15 years in prison. The court ruled that the chemical attack on Halabja constituted genocide, but van Anraat was found guilty only of complicity in war crimes. In March 2008, the government of Iraq announced plans to take legal action against the suppliers of chemicals used in the attack.

In 2013, 20 Iraqi Kurds who were victims of the attack requested a judicial investigation into two unnamed French companies, saying that they were among 20 or more companies that helped Saddam Hussein construct a chemical weapons arsenal. The Kurds sought for an investigating judge to open a case.

== Controversies ==
=== Allegations of Iranian involvement ===
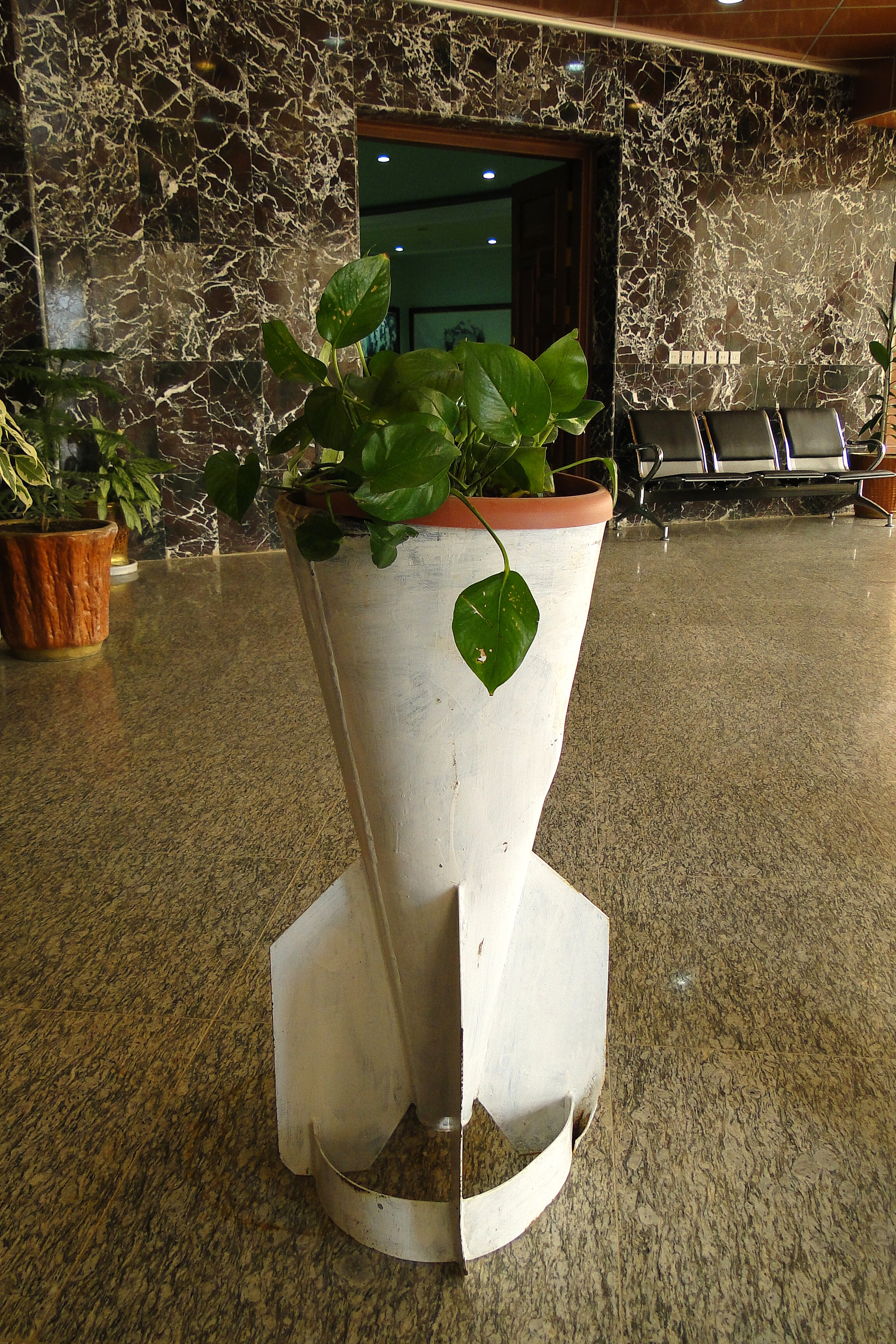
An original bomb casing used as flower pot at the Halabja Memorial Monument in 2011

The U.S. State Department, in the immediate aftermath of the incident, took the official position that Iran was partly to blame. A preliminary Defense Intelligence Agency (DIA) study at the time reported that Iran was responsible for the attack, an assessment which was used subsequently by the Central Intelligence Agency (CIA) for much of the early 1990s. The CIA's senior political analyst for the Iran-Iraq war, Stephen C. Pelletiere, co-authored an unclassified analysis of the war which contained a brief summary of the DIA study's key points. Pelletiere claimed that blue discolorations around the mouths of the victims and in their extremities suggested that a blood agent using cyanide was used in the attack at Halabja, and that only Iran was known to have used blood agents during the war. No proof that Iran had previously used hydrocyanic gas, as asserted by the DIA, was ever presented.

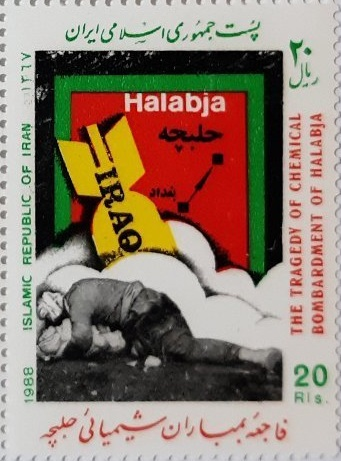
Iranian stamp, issued 1988, commemorating the victims of Halabja, including the previously shown image of Omer Khawar.

Joost Hiltermann, who was the principal researcher for Human Rights Watch between 1992 and 1994, conducted a two-year study of the massacre, including a field investigation in northern Iraq. Hiltermann writes: "Analysis of thousands of captured Iraqi secret police documents and declassified U.S. government documents, as well as interviews with scores of Kurdish survivors, senior Iraqi defectors and retired U.S. intelligence officers, show (1) that Iraq carried out the attack on Halabja, and (2) that the United States, fully aware it was Iraq, accused Iran, Iraq's enemy in a fierce war, of being partly responsible for the attack." This research concluded there were numerous other gas attacks, unquestionably perpetrated against the Kurds by the Iraqi armed forces. In 2001, Jean Pascal Zanders of the Stockholm International Peace Research Institute (SIPRI)'s Chemical and Biological Warfare Project also dismissed the allegations, arguing that "The coloring of the victims is more suggestive of sarin, which was in Iraq's arsenal." Leo Casey, writing in Dissent Magazine in 2003, observed that Pelletiere's analysis was based solely on images and testimony of blue discolorations and ignored all other evidence—including the recollections of hundreds of Kurdish witnesses; academic studies based on medical examinations, soil samples, and autopsies; and captured Iraqi government documents—proving Iraqi culpability.

Hiltermann noted that although cyanosis (the medical term for the blue discolorations in question) is etymologically related to cyanide, the former condition indicates only a blood supply deprived of oxygen, and is in no way sufficient to diagnose cyanide poisoning; in fact, "it could just as easily suggest the use of a nerve agent." Furthermore, "Even the proven presence of cyanide gas at Halabja would not necessarily implicate Iran," for two reasons outlined by Hiltermann. Prior to Halabja, Iranian forces made widespread use of amyl nitrite to counter what they repeatedly alleged was Iraqi cyanide gas. If those Iranian claims are accepted, then "By that logic, Iraq could also be implicated in any Halabja deaths by cyanide." However, cyanide evaporates rapidly and tabun—a major part of Iraq's chemical arsenal at the time—contains cyanide as an essential ingredient, factors that rendered it impossible for the UN to confirm any Iraqi use of cyanide gas during the Iran–Iraq war: "Because of its connection to tabun, if hydrocyanide is found in a given environment, it could be either the residual effect of poorly manufactured tabun or a breakdown element when tabun decomposes."

According to Hiltermann, the literature on the Iran–Iraq war reflects a number of allegations of chemical weapons use by Iran, but these are "marred by a lack of specificity as to time and place, and the failure to provide any sort of evidence." Hiltermann called these allegations "mere assertions" and added that "no persuasive evidence of the claim that Iran was the primary culprit was ever presented." Many sources state that Iran's chemical weapons capability at the time was extremely limited to non-existent, although it is possible that Iran could have captured chemical munitions from Iraqi troops; for example, military analyst Ahmed Hashim recounted that "The Iranians only had tear gas. No cyanide." In fact, far from having a meaningful chemical warfare capability, Iran's effectiveness merely in protecting its own soldiers from chemical attacks is open to question as the low-quality protective equipment that it belatedly received from East Germany and North Korea was intended for use against paint fumes; the unwillingness of many Iranians to shave their beards also limited the efficacy of the masks. A 1987 UN report conducted at the behest of both belligerents discovered weapon fragments that established Iraqi responsibility for chemical attacks on Iranian soldiers and civilians, but could not substantiate Iraq's allegations of Iranian chemical weapons use: "Iraqi forces have been affected by mustard gas and a pulmonary element, possibly phosgene. In the absence of conclusive evidence of the weapons used, it could not be determined how the injuries were caused." Evidence suggests that these Iraqi chemical casualties were likely the result of "blowback," whereas the evidence that Iraq submitted to the UN—such as two Iranian 130 mm shells that UN specialists found had "no internal chemical-resistant coating" and were "normally used for filling with high explosives"—did not withstand scrutiny; UN official Iqbal Riza later acknowledged that Iraq's evidence was "clearly fabricated." However, the report's phrasing—"chemical weapons were again used against Iranian forces by Iraqi forces ... now also Iraqi forces have sustained injuries from chemical warfare"—contributed to an erroneous perception that Iran and Iraq were equally at fault.

Documents uncovered after the 2003 invasion of Iraq show that Iraqi military intelligence was not aware of any large-scale chemical attacks by Iranian forces, although a March 1987 document describes five small-scale chemical attacks perpetrated by the Iranians (four involving mustard gas and one involving phosgene, with the likely source being captured Iraqi munitions), and there are also reports of Iranian use of tear gas and white phosphorus. As recounted by Williamson Murray and Kevin M. Woods: "Despite rumors of Iranian chemical threats and occasional battlefield use (mostly [tear gas] and captured Iraqi chemical rounds), by 1988, the Iraqis were satisfied that there was no near-term threat. An intelligence report [dated 27 June 1988] discussing North Korea's help to the Iranians to develop an indigenous mustard gas capability, however, pointed toward a future where Iraqi troops might need to worry about chemical attacks."

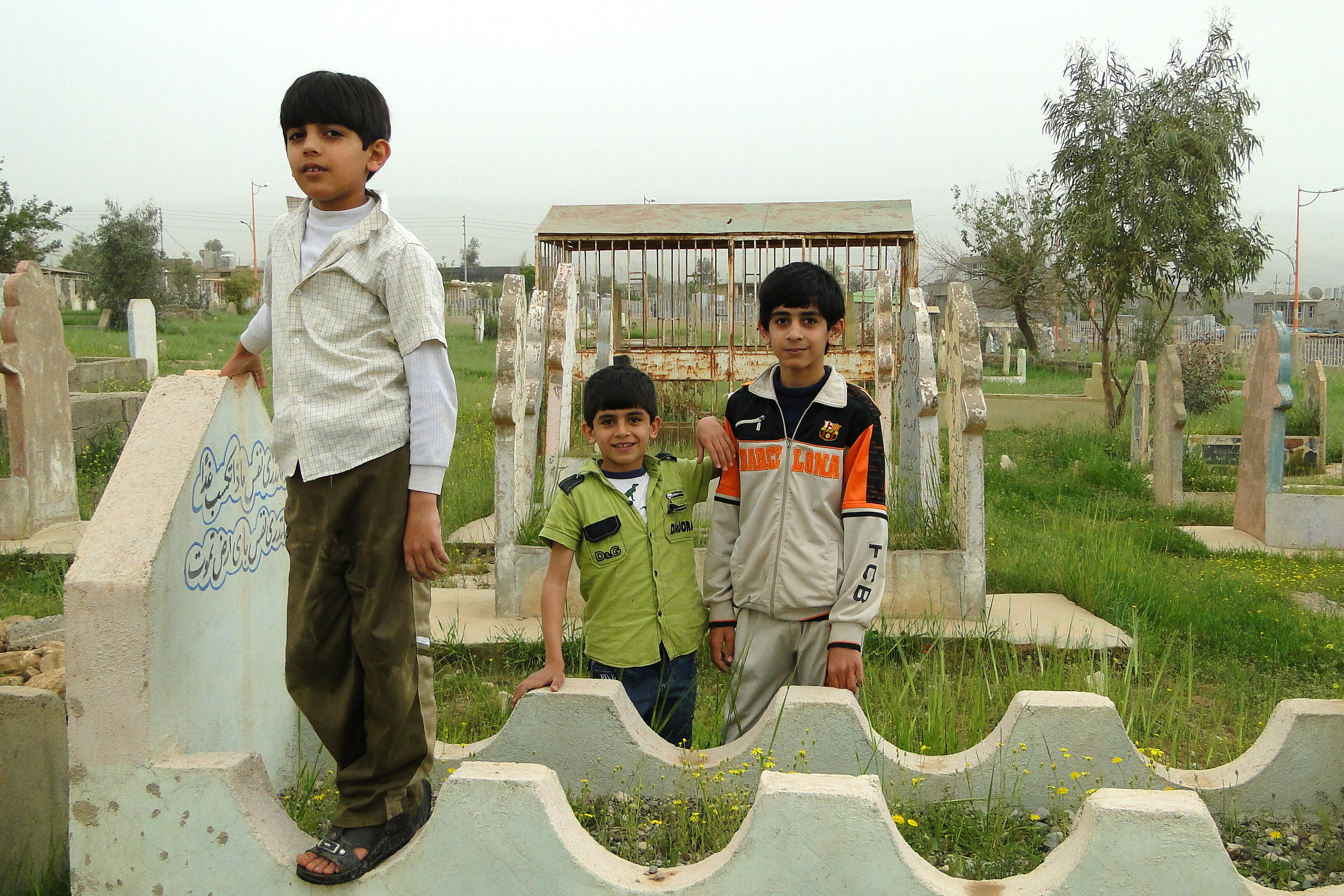
Children playing in the Halabja cemetery, 2011

=== 2006 Halabja memorial protest ===
In March 2003, the Halabja Martyrs Monument was built in the still largely ruined city. On 16 March 2006, a few thousand residents, many of them students in high school or university, demonstrated at the site in protest of what they perceived as the neglect of living Halabjans and the Kurdish leadership's commodification of the tragedy. The memorial was set on fire, destroying most of its archives; student protestor Kurda Ahmed was shot dead by the police and dozens of people were injured. Kurdish authorities alleged that Islamic militants were responsible for the violence. It was later rebuilt as the Halabja Memorial Monument, also known as Halabja Monument and Peace Museum.

== In popular culture ==
- In 2008, Kayhan Kalhor and Brooklyn Rider released the album Silent City in memory of the Halabja Massacre. As Kalhor writes on the back cover, "The piece commemorates the Kurdish village of Halabja in Iraqi Kurdistan. It is based on an altered A-minor scale and uses Kurdish themes to remember the Kurdish people." In 2011, Kayhan Kalhor, Yo-Yo Ma and The Silk Road Ensemble performed Silent City at Sanders Theater. Silk Road Project released video of the last part of the performance on YouTube.
- Canadian industrial-electronic band Skinny Puppy comments upon the Halabja chemical attacks in their song "VX Gas Attack" on their 1988 album VIVIsectVI.
- In 2001, the movie Jiyan about the Halabja attack was released. This movie was directed by Jano Rosebiani.

== See also ==
- Halabja Martyrs Monument
- Anti-Kurdish sentiment
- Anti-Shi'ism
- History of the Kurds
- Modern history of Iraq
- Human rights in Saddam Hussein's Iraq
- Iraq chemical attacks against Iran
- Dujail Massacre (1982)
- Chemical attack on Behbahan battalion (1986)
- Anfal campaign
- Chemical bombing of Sardasht (1987)
- 1991 Iraqi uprisings
- 2013 Ghouta attacks
- List of massacres in Iraq

== Literature ==
- Joost R. Hiltermann, A Poisonous Affair: America, Iraq, and the Gassing of Halabja (2007) ISBN 0-521-87686-9
- Michael J. Kelly, Ghosts of Halabja: Saddam Hussein & the Kurdish Genocide (2008) ISBN 0-275-99210-1
- Samantha Power, A Problem from Hell: America and the Age of Genocide (2003) ISBN 0-06-054164-4
- Lawrence Potter, Gary Sick, Iran, Iraq, and the Legacies of War (2004) ISBN 1-4039-6450-5
