= Kurdish-Islamic nationalism =

Ideology involving Kurdish nationalism and Islamism

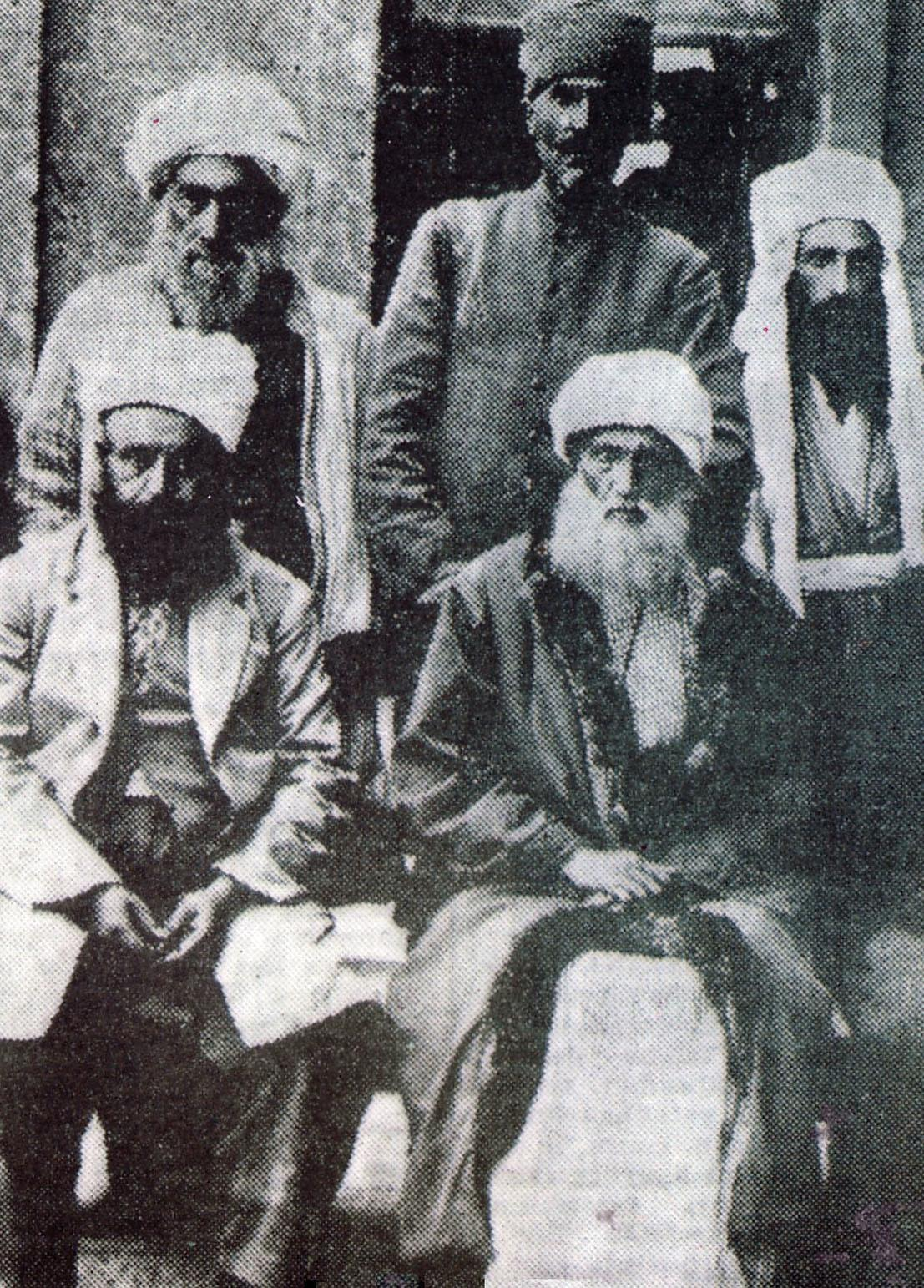
Front row, left to right: Shiekh Sherif, Sheikh Said, back row: Sheikh Hamid, Major Kasim (Kasım Ataç), Sheikh Abdullah.

Kurdish-Islamic synthesis, or Kurdish-Islamic nationalism (Sorani: کوردایەتیی ئیسلامی; Kurmanji: Kurdayetîya Îslamî), is a form of Kurdish nationalism which is Islamist in nature, unlike mainstream Kurdish nationalism, which is secularist in nature.

== History ==
The ideology emerged after the abolition of the Caliphate and the creation of Turkey, which angered many Kurds, who felt that their culture, religion, language, and people were endangered because of Atatürk's reforms. The ideology was also a response to the Turkish–Islamic synthesis which emerged during the late Ottoman Empire, as "the Kurdish religious leaders became aware that the Turks had used Islamic symbols and sentiments in favour of their nationalist aims, so they tried to do the same".

The ideology was mainly associated with Sheikh Said. Another ideologue is Mullah Krekar. In some videos, Mullah Krekar speaks about Kurdish issues and supporting Kurdish independence. He was described as "publishing political and nationalistic statements one day, and Jihadi statements on the next". Mullah Krekar is also a populist, and his popularity in Iraqi Kurdistan rose between 2017 and 2019, mainly among the youth who were against the Kurdish government. Mullah Krekar also added that secularism "has destroyed Kurdish values". He rejected parts of nationalism which conflicted with Islam.

During the Iran–Iraq War, Kurdish Islamists broke ties with the Muslim Brotherhood, accusing them of holding Arab nationalist views and being supportive of Saddam Hussein.

The Shafi'i school was praised for its role in the preservation of Kurdish culture, especially language. The KTTC claimed that if Kurds stopped speaking Kurdish, they would then leave the Shafi'i school, and eventually stop identifying as Kurds. In addition to official status for the Kurdish language, official status for the Shafi'i school was a popular demand of the early Kurdish nationalists during the Ottoman Empire. The Hanafi school was the official sect of the Ottoman Empire and was publicly encouraged by the government. The Shafi'i school became an outward sign for Kurds to assert their identity in the region. In Kurdish society, adherence to the Shafi'i school was seen as essential to being a Kurd. The Kurds were essentially a Shafi'i exclave surrounded by Hanafi Turks, Hanafi-Hanbali Arabs, Shia Persians, Lurs, Azerbaijanis, and Arabs, and Christian Armenians and Assyrians. When Turkish nationalists knew the role of the Shafi'i school in Kurdish society, they attempted to spread the Hanafi school to Kurds in hopes that it leads them into adopting a Turkish identity as well. Not all Sunni Kurds were Shafi'i, as many in Turkey were Hanafi. Some Shafi'i Kurds who urbanized and integrated into the political system became Hanafi. Many of the Hanafi Kurds descended from Yazidis and Alevi Kurds who were Islamized under Abdul Hamid II, as opposed to the Shafi'i Kurds who were Islamized centuries before. During the 2010s, it was noted that Shafi'i Kurds were more devout, while Hanafi Kurds were more secular. However, Shafi'i Kurds were more likely to vote for BDP, while Hanafi Kurds were more likely to vote for AKP. Shafi'i Kurds had a higher tendency to be nationalist, while Hanafi Kurds were more pro-Turkey. Most Shafi'i Kurds believed there was discrimination against Kurds in Turkey, while most Hanafi Kurds did not. Historically, Hanafi Kurds were generally urban and integrated into the political system, while the Shafi'i Kurds were generally tribal, rural, and disregarded state authority, whether Ottoman or Republic. The case of the Hanafi and Shafi'i Kurds was also linked to the fact that the Hanafi school traditionally emphasized loyalty to state authority, while the Shafi'i school was indifferent to it. In the early 20th century, before the Talabani family was associated with the PUK that they later founded, the Talabani family was led by Sheikh Hamid, the highest Shafi'i authority in Kurdistan who was extremely anti-Turkish and rejected Ottoman requests for assistance, instead siding with the British.

In the 1980s, many Kurdish students at İmam Hatip schools "increasingly emphasised their Kurdish identity in opposition to the Turkish military operations". The relations between secular Kurds and Islamist Kurds quickly went from extremely tense to "quite cordial". Many Islamist Kurds began adopting nationalism, while many secular Kurds, including the PKK, had "given up their earlier arrogant attitude toward Islam" after the newfound unity with the Islamists.

The synthesis grew during the split between Kurdish and Turkish Islamists, as the Kurds accused the Turks continuing the nationalist and assimilationist policies of the state even during Islamist discourse, and using the topic of Islamic fraternity while simultaneously attempting to assimilate Kurds by using religion. Kurdish Islamists increasingly left Turkish Islamist circles.

Kurdish-Islamic nationalism is often hostile to other nationalisms in the region, and is also against Secularism, Kemalism, and Ba'athism.

== Criticism ==
Many of the Kurdistan Islamic Union's politicians, including their leader Salahaddin Bahaaddin, have criticized the ideology, saying that "This is a huge heresy", "Islam can not be nationalized", and that "There is only one Islam, the Islam of Allah."

In 2013, Altan Tan claimed that the "Kurdish-Islamic synthesis" was an excuse made by Turkish–Islamic synthesists to justify them "using Islam to paint their own empire and hegemony."

== Organizations ==
=== Iran ===
- Salvation Force
- Organization of Iranian Kurdistan Struggle (later secularised)

=== Iraq ===
- Ansar al-Islam in Kurdistan
- Rawti Shax
- Kurdistan Islamic Movement
- Kurdistan Justice Group
- White Flags
- Iraqi Feyli Islamic Council

=== Syria ===
- Kurdish Islamic Front
- Movement of Salah al-Din the Kurd

=== Turkey ===
- Free Cause Party
- Islamic Party of Kurdistan
- Kurdish Hezbollah
- Kurdistan Islamic Movement (Turkey)
- Azadi Party of TADK

== Notable figures ==
- Sheikh Ubeydullah
- Abdulkadir Ubeydullah
- Sheikh Said
- Mahmud Barzanji
- Muhammad Uthman Siraj al-Din
- Osman Abdulaziz
- Ali Abdulaziz Halabji
- Ali Bapir
- Mullah Krekar
- Adham Barzani
- Hüseyin Velioğlu
- Abdullah Beğik
- Mashouq al-Khaznawi
- Zekeriya Yapıcıoğlu
- Assi al-Qawali
- Khider Kosari
- Ezaddin Husseini (formerly)
- Said Nursi - while not a Kurdish nationalist, he was a Kurdish Islamic scholar and a sharp critic of nationalism in general, particularly Kemalism. His ideas are highly influential within modern political Islam.

== See also ==
- Kurdish Muslims
- Islamokemalism
- Islamism
- Kurdish nationalism
- List of Kurdish organisations
- Turkish-Islamic synthesis
- Arab-Islamic nationalism
