= Kurdish mujahideen =

Kurdish Islamist rebels

- Leaders: Osman Abdulaziz; Mullah Krekar; Ali Bapir; Adham Barzani; Mohammad Khalid Barzani; Khider Kosari
- Active regions: Kurdistan
- Ideology: Kurdish nationalism; Islamism; Anti-Ba'athism; Separatism
- Size: over 10,000

The Kurdish mujahideen (Kurdish: Mucahidîn Kurd) is a term used for Kurdish Islamists who fought the Ba'athist Iraqi government.

== History ==
During the Iran–Iraq War, Sheikh Osman Abdulaziz, leader of the IMK, called for an independent Kurdish nation, as well as declaring a holy war against Iraq and against Ba'athism, which led independent Kurdish Islamists, Kurdish Islamist organizations, and even Peshmerga soldiers who had Islamist leanings, to form a type of united front. Many Kurdish Islamists set up training camps in the mountains of Kurdistan, recruited people, and began rebelling against Iraq.

The IMK also sent delegations of Kurds to visit Osama bin Laden, in which they told him about the atrocities that Saddam Hussein was committing in Iraqi Kurdistan. After al-Qaeda relocated to Khartoum, Sudan, in 1991, an al-Qaeda instructor visited Iraqi Kurdistan to train the IMK rebels in 1992.

Shortly before the Halabja massacre, Saddam Hussein cracked down on Kurdish Islamic scholars, which led them to flee Halabja and go to Iran, where they had strong support. That was when the Kurdish mujahideen became active in Halabja, which would later become their stronghold. Many Kurds from Halabja concluded that Jihad was the best way to Iraq. The mujahideen received many Kurdish volunteers from Iran.

The mujahideen participated in the Iran–Iraq War, but at the end of the war in 1988, they mostly halted their operations, but maintained a low-level insurgency against Iraq. In the 1991 Iraqi uprisings during the Gulf War, the mujahideen heavily increased their activities, and towards the end of the war, they slowed down again. They had over 10,000 fighters at their peak. In 1991, the Kurdish rebels established the Kurdistan Region, and the Kurdish mujahideen established the Islamic Emirate of Kurdistan within the autonomous Kurdistan Region.

The Islamic Emirate of Kurdistan was later seized by more radical elements within the Kurdish mujahideen, and the Islamist insurgency in Iraqi Kurdistan began. The united mujahideen ended after the overthrow of Saddam Hussein, although the groups remained.

Osman Abdulaziz and Adham Barzani had hosted Hüseyin Velioğlu and his soldiers in Iraqi Kurdistan to train for an offensive against Turkey.

== Groups ==
- IMK; led by Osman Abdulaziz
- KJG; led by Ali Bapir
- KRH; led by Adham Barzani
- KHI; led by Mohammad Khalid Barzani
- Islah (short-lived); led by Mullah Krekar
- Independent Mujahideen; no centralized leadership
- Peshmerga soldiers with Islamist leanings; no centralized leadership
- AAI; led by Mullah Krekar, and later Abu Abdullah al-Shafi'i

== See also ==
- Iraqi Kurdish Civil War
- KDPI–Komala conflict
- Islamist insurgency in Iraqi Kurdistan
- Rojava-Islamist conflict

Other mujahideen groups:

- Chechen Mujahideen
- Indian Mujahideen
- Kuwaiti mujahideen
- Afghan mujahideen
- Bosnian mujahideen
