= Muhammed Ala-ad-din al-Tavili =

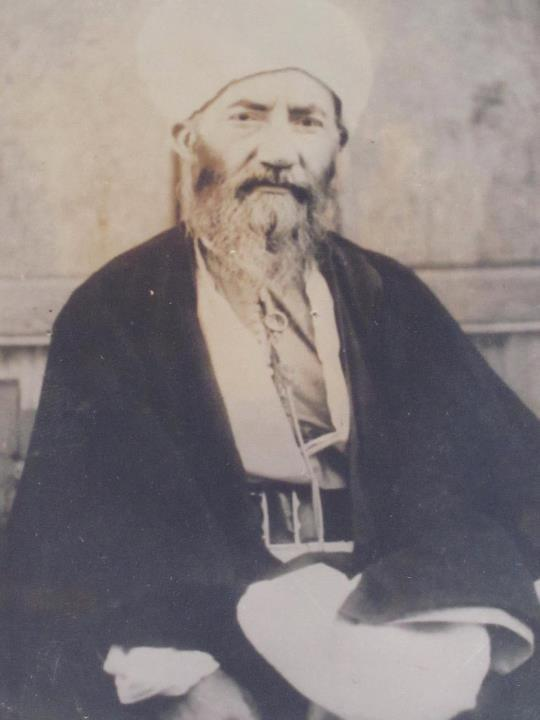
- Born: 1863; Tawella, Iraq
- Died: 1953 (aged 89–90); Biyara, Iraq
- Title: Sheikh; Beg; Effendi
- Father: Omar Diya-ud-Din al-Tavili
- Relatives: Sheikh Ali Hisam-ad-Din Naqshbandi; Uthman Sirâj-ud-Dîn Naqshbandi; Muhammad Uthman Siraj al-Din; Muhammed Bahaeddin al-Tavili
- Family: House of Tavil

Sheikh Muhammed Ala-ad-din al-Tavili (Arabic: الشَّيخ مُحَمَّدْ عَلاءُ الدّين نَقشبَندي), also known as Ala-ad-din al-Tavili or Muhammed Ala-ad-din al-Biyârî (1863–1953), was a scholar and Sufi. Born in 1863 in the village of Tavila, which was part of the Ottoman Empire at the time, Muhammed Ala-ad-din was the son of Omar Diya-ud-Din al-Tavili.

He belonged to one of the most influential noble households of the Middle East and Ottoman Empire, the House of Tavil.

== Life ==
Upon his father's death, when his brother Muhammed Najm-ad-Din assumed the leadership of the Biyara Lodge, he went to the village of Dereşiş, located between Halabja and Biyara, and established a lodge there. However, he could not stay in Dereşiş for long. A year later, he moved to the village of Servabad in the Hawraman region of Iran, where his relatives resided, and lived there for two years.

In 1901, Muhammed Ala-ad-din went to the village of Durud, where the local administrators of Iran’s Hawraman region constructed the Durud Lodge for him. Along with the lodge, additional accommodations were built and gifted to him. After settling in Durud village and establishing a lodge and madrasa, he attracted a large number of students and scholars.

In 1917, during the continuation of World War I, a famine and scarcity left the people in dire straits. Muhammed Ala-ad-din used all the material resources at his disposal to alleviate the hardships of the people and assist the poor.

In 1919, Muhammed Ala-ad-din returned to Biyara from Iran and assumed the leadership of the Biyara Lodge after the passing of his brother, Muhammed Najm-ad-Din, continuing his spiritual guidance there. He later trained many students in cities and towns such as Baneh, Saqqez, Marivan, Javanrud, and Sanandaj. Known for his calm, quiet, compassionate, and generous nature, he devoted significant effort to repairing villages and schools and placed great importance on planting trees and developing the areas where he lived.

== Relationship with the Ottoman Sultan ==
Muhammed Ala-ad-Din, who had good relations with the Yıldız Palace in Istanbul, is known to have had a friendship with Sultan Abdulhamid II. Sultan Abdulhamid II gifted him a large library, which included many valuable handwritten works. These books were preserved by Muhammed Ala-ad-Din in a specially built library building.

== Death ==
Muhammed Alâeddîn, who continued his scholarly and spiritual guidance activities regularly, died in 1373/1953 at the age of 90. He was buried next to his father, Ömer Ziyâeddîn, and his brother, Muhammed Necmeddin, at the Biyara Lodge. The following lines were written on the graves of Ömer Ziyâeddîn et-Tavilî and his family in Biyara:

"This is where the lions of the order rest."

== His works ==
- Mektupları
- Tıbbu’l-Kulûb
