= 1992 Kurdistan Region general election =

- 19 May 1992
- Presidential election
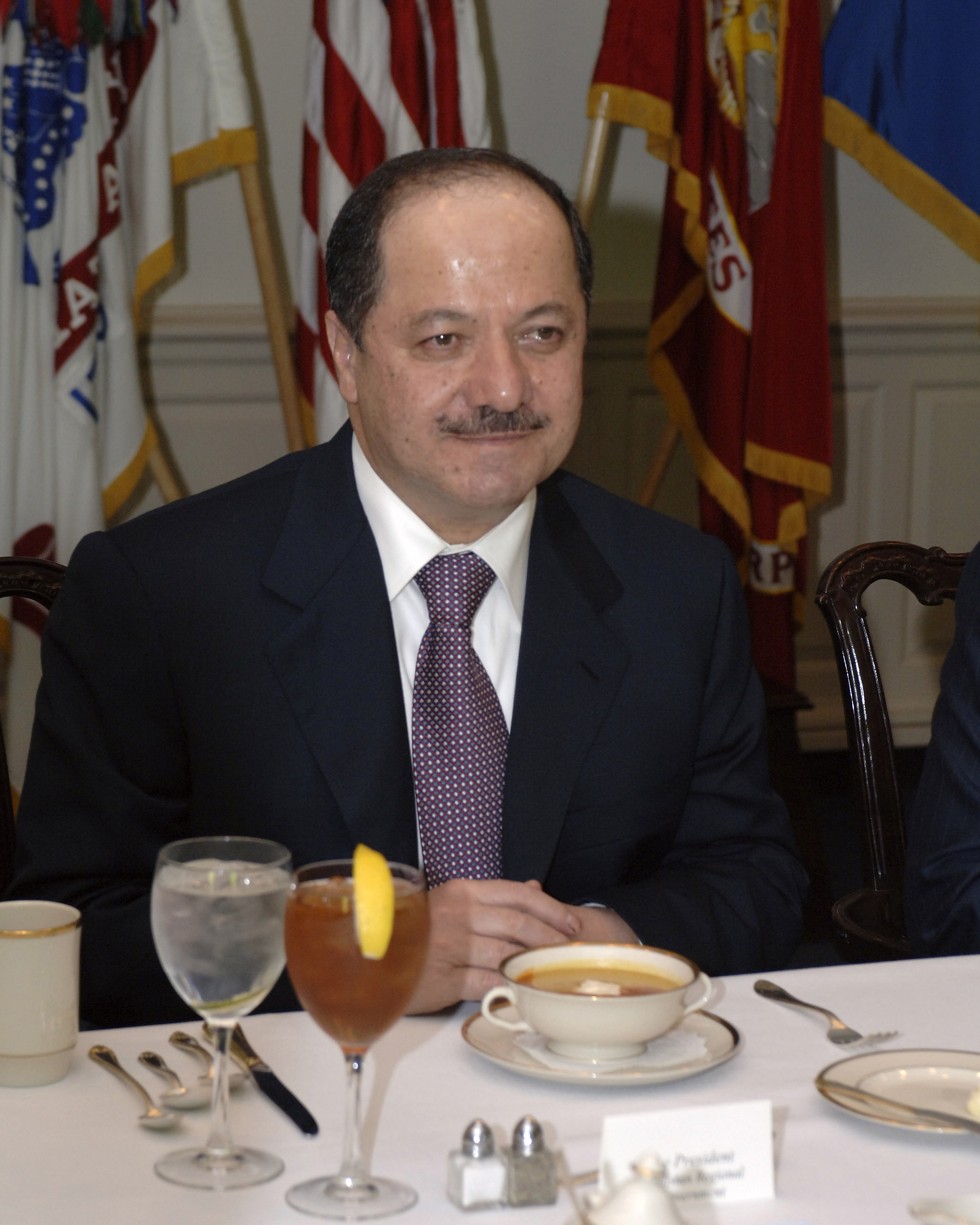

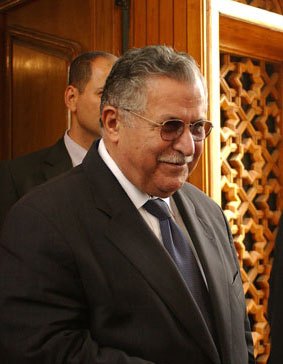
Candidate	Massoud Barzani	Jalal Talabani
Party	KDP	PUK
Popular vote	466,819	423,833
Percentage	48.09%	43.82%
Elected President
None
Position abolished
- National Assembly election
- All 105 seats in the Kurdistan National Assembly; 53 seats needed for a majority
Party	Leader	Vote %	Seats
KDP	Massoud Barzani	45.27	51
PUK	Jalal Talabani	43.82	49
Assyrian seats
ADM	Ninos Pithyou	54.66	4
KCU	Sarkis Aghajan	23.03	1
This lists parties that won seats. See the complete results below.
Results by governorate
Prime Minister after
Fuad Masum; PUK

The 1992 Kurdistan Region general election was held in the Kurdistan Region of Iraq on 19 May 1992 to elect the president and the 105 members of the Kurdistan National Assembly. It was the first free and fair election in the history of the Kurdistan Region, held just one year after the 1991 Kurdish uprisings against the Ba’ath regime. The elections had initially been planned for 16 May, but were delayed due to concerns about ink smudging, which could have led to voter fraud.

The elections took place under the protection of a no-fly zone established by many countries, including the US, UK, and France.

== Presidential election ==
In the first round of the presidential election, Kurdistan Democratic Party (KDP) leader Massoud Barzani received slightly more votes than his main rival, Jalal Talabani, the leader of the Patriotic Union of Kurdistan (PUK). With neither candidate receiving an absolute majority of the vote, a second round was scheduled to be held. However, both leaders feared they might lose in a run-off, so the second round was never held, and the Kurdistan Regional Government decided to proceed without a president. Instead they established an eight-member Presidency Council consisting of four members from each party.

== Parliamentary election ==
The Kurdistan National Assembly election resulted in a narrow victory for the KDP, which won 51 seats, while the PUK-led alliance won 49 seats. However, due to fraud allegations, the KDP gave up one seat to the PUK so that each party would hold 50 seats. The two parties then proceeded to form a unity government.

On 4 June 1992, KDP Secretary General Jawhar Namiq Salim was elected Speaker of the Kurdistan National Assembly and prominent PUK member Fuad Masum was elected Prime Minister of Kurdistan Region.

The Kurdistan National Assembly convened for the first time on 15 July 1992 and passed Law No. 1, which established the Assembly as the region’s legislature.

== Aftermath ==
The government lasted until May 1994, when the Kurdish Civil War broke out. The war lasted until 1998, after which the Kurdistan Region was divided into a PUK-controlled zone in the southeast and a KDP-controlled zone in the northwest.

Due to the civil war in the region, no new elections were held until 2005. The first term of parliament, which was supposed to last three years, ended up lasting 10 years, from 1992 to 2002. The next election was held in 2005, alongside the Iraqi parliamentary election.

== Electoral system ==
The president was elected using the two-round system; if no candidate received a majority of the vote, a second round would be held.

Of the 105 seats in the National Assembly, 100 were general seats elected by proportional representation with a 7% electoral threshold. Five seats were reserved for the Assyrian minority. There were 178 polling stations.

== Conduct ==
The elections were described as free and fair by international observers. Amnesty International reports that some smaller parties alleged irregularities.

== Results ==
=== President ===
Candidate	Party	Votes	%
Masoud Barzani	Kurdistan Democratic Party	466,819	48.12
Jalal Talabani	Patriotic Union of Kurdistan	441,057	45.47
Osman Abdulaziz	Kurdistan Islamic Movement	38,865	4.01
Mahmoud Othman	Kurdistan Socialist Party	23,309	2.40
Total		970,050	100.00
Valid votes		970,050	98.72
Invalid/blank votes		12,599	1.28
Total votes		982,649	100.00
Source: Wanche, Dahlman

=== National Assembly ===
Party	Votes	%	Seats
Kurdistan Democratic Party	437,879	45.27	51
Patriotic Union of Kurdistan (Note: Including the Struggle Party and the Kurdistan Toilers' Party, which won four seats)	423,833	43.82	49
Kurdistan Islamic Movement	49,108	5.08	0
Kurdistan Socialist Party	24,882	2.57	0
Iraqi Communist Party	21,123	2.18	0
Kurdistan Popular Democratic Party	9,903	1.02	0
Independent Democrats	501	0.05	0
Total	967,229	100.00	100
Valid votes	967,229	99.51	
Invalid/blank votes	4,724	0.49	
Total votes	971,953	100.00	
Assyrian seats
Assyrian Democratic Movement	6,543	54.66	4
Kurdistan Christian Unity	2,757	23.03	1
Khaldu-Ashur Communist Party	2,134	17.83	0
Democratic Christians	537	4.49	0
Total	11,971	100.00	5
Source: Dahlman

==== By governorate ====
===== Dahuk Governorate =====
Party	Votes	%
Kurdistan Democratic Party	168,683	85.47
Patriotic Union of Kurdistan	15,184	7.69
Kurdistan Popular Democratic Party	6,051	3.07
Kurdistan Islamic Movement	3,874	1.96
Kurdistan Socialist Party	1,983	1.00
Iraqi Communist Party	1,546	0.78
Independent Democrats	49	0.02
Total	197,370	100.00

Note: Dahuk included the Aqrah and Shekhan Districts which were officially part of Nineveh Governorate.

===== Erbil Governorate =====
Party	Votes	%
Kurdistan Democratic Party	152,143	45.58
Patriotic Union of Kurdistan	148,352	44.44
Kurdistan Islamic Movement	11,092	3.32
Iraqi Communist Party	11,047	3.31
Kurdistan Socialist Party	8,883	2.66
Kurdistan Popular Democratic Party	2,101	0.63
Independent Democrats	184	0.06
Total	333,802	100.00

Note: The Makhmour district was at this time still under control of the Iraqi government, no elections were held there.

===== As Sulaymaniya Governorate =====
Party	Votes	%
Patriotic Union of Kurdistan	207,168	59.54
Kurdistan Democratic Party	92,449	26.57
Kurdistan Islamic Movement	29,334	8.43
Kurdistan Socialist Party	11,978	3.44
Iraqi Communist Party	5,693	1.64
Kurdistan Popular Democratic Party	1,118	0.32
Independent Democrats	213	0.06
Total	347,953	100.00

===== Diyala Governorate =====
Party	Votes	%
Patriotic Union of Kurdistan	53,129	60.28
Kurdistan Democratic Party	24,604	27.92
Kurdistan Islamic Movement	4,808	5.46
Iraqi Communist Party	2,837	3.22
Kurdistan Socialist Party	2,038	2.31
Kurdistan Popular Democratic Party	663	0.75
Independent Democrats	55	0.06
Total	88,134	100.00

Only two areas in the Diyala Governorate were under Kurdish control: Darbandikhan and Khanaqin.
