= Kuwaiti mujahideen =

Salafi jihadist group proposed by Osama bin Laden

- Leader: Osama bin Laden
- Dates active: 1990
- Ideology: Salafi jihadism
- Status: Proposed by Osama bin Laden in 1990, rejected by Saudi Arabia
- Size: 100,000

The Kuwaiti mujahideen were a group of 100,000 Al-Qaeda militants proposed by Osama bin Laden to fight Iraqi troops in Kuwait during the Gulf War. The Saudi government rejected the Kuwaiti mujahideen and opted instead for American troops, marking a turning point in their relations with Osama bin Laden, who began opposing the Saudi monarchy and directing attacks on the United States.

== History ==
Following the Iraqi invasion of Kuwait, the United States prepared to deploy troops to Saudi Arabia to fight in Kuwait. Osama bin Laden told the Saudi government that it was not necessary to invite "infidel" troops to Saudi Arabia, claiming that he was able to offer 100,000 mujahideen instead. The Saudi government was initially open to the idea, although quickly rejected the offer after American pressure.

Osama bin Laden had always opposed Saddam Hussein, and claimed that the mujahideen were not only able to expel Iraqi troops from Kuwait, but also enter Iraq and overthrow the Ba'athist government. Osama bin Laden also did not consider Saddam Hussein a Muslim. Later, Khalid Batarfi claimed that Osama bin Laden had predicted the Iraqi invasion of Kuwait much earlier than when it happened. In his interview with Hamid Mir, Osama bin Laden insulted Saddam Hussein as a "socialist motherfucker", adding that "the land of the Arab world, the land is like a mother and Saddam Hussein is fucking his mother", also accusing him of discouraging Iraqis from going to Afghanistan.

Prince Sultan rejected the offer and considered the American troops more effective and reliable. When around 250,000 American troops were deployed in early 1991, Osama bin Laden felt humiliated and cut ties with the Saudi monarchy. Many jihadists also claimed that the Saudi monarchy had shown their true "infidel" nature. American troops being permanently stationed in Saudi Arabia had marked a turning point, in which Osama bin Laden began opposing the Saudi monarchy and referred to the Saudi government as occupiers. Prince Sultan defended the Saudi rejection of the offer, claiming that Kuwaiti terrain was nothing like Afghan terrain, and that the Al-Qaeda militants could not survive Iraqi chemical weapons. However, Osama bin Laden remained insistent that the mujahideen could fight the Iraqi army with their faith, and had even offered services of his family construction firm to build defenses in Kuwait like they had in Afghanistan. Osama bin Laden claimed that American troops being stationed in Saudi Arabia was the biggest shock of his life.

Following the Saudi rejection of the offer, Osama bin Laden relocated to Khartoum, Sudan. Al-Qaeda became strictly devoted to Anti-Americanism and attacked the World Trade Center shortly after in 1993. Early during the 1991 Iraqi uprisings, delegations from the Kurdistan Islamic Movement of Osman Abdulaziz had visited Osama bin Laden and told him about the atrocities that Saddam Hussein was committing against Kurds, and after al-Qaeda relocated to Sudan in 1991, a senior al-Qaeda instructor was sent to Iraqi Kurdistan in 1992 to train the rebels.
