= Al-Jama'a al-Islamiyya (disambiguation) =

Al-Jama'a al-Islamiyya (Arabic: الجماعة الإسلامية), "Islamic Group", may refer to:

- Al-Jama'a al-Islamiyya, the Egyptian Sunni Islamist movement
- Al-Jamā'ah al-Islāmiyyah al-Aḥmadiyyah, alternative name for the Ahmadiyya movement
- Jemaah Islamiyah, a Southeast Asian organization
- al-Jama'ah al-Islamiyah al-Musallaha, Islamist insurgent group in Algeria
- Al-Jama'a al-Islamiyya (Lebanon), Sunni Islamist political party in Lebanon
- Al-Jama’a al-Islamiyyah al-Muqatilah bi-Libya, the armed Islamist group in Libya
- Al-Jama'a al-Islamiyya al-Kurdistaniya

== See also ==
- Jamaat-e-Islami (disambiguation)
