= Uthman Sirâj-ud-Dîn Naqshbandi =

Uthman Sirâj-ud-Dîn Al-Naqshbandi
- Born: 1781; Tawella, Ottoman Empire
- Died: February 10, 1867 (aged 85–86) / 6 Shawwal 1284 AH; Tawella, Ottoman Empire
- Title: Sheikh; Beg; Effendi
- Children: Muhammed Bahaeddin al-Tavili Omar Diya-ud-Din al-Tavili
- Father: Khaled Beg
- Family: House of Tavil

Sheikh ‘Uthman Sirâj-ud-Dîn Al-Naqshbandi (Arabic: الشيخ عثمان الطويلي النقشبندي; Turkish: Osman Sirâceddîn Nakşibendi) known as Uthman Siraj-ud-Din at-Tavili or Uthman Siraj-ud-Din al-Awal (b. 1781 AD/c. 1195 AH Tawella, Iraq - d. 1867 AD/c. 1284 AH Tawella, Iraq) was an 18th-century Kurdish sufi, saint and Islamic scholar. He was a descendant of Sayyid Battal Gazi. He belonged to one of the most influential noble households of the Middle East and Ottoman Empire, the Sheikhs of Tavil.

== Family lineage ==
The family of Uthman Sirâj-ud-Dîn, can be traced back to the 7th century.

He is Uthman ibn Khâlid ibn Abdullah ibn Sayyid Muhammad ibn Sayyid Darwish ibn Sayyid Mashraf ibn Sayyid Jumu'ah ibn Sayyid Zahir (which is one of the blessed Sayyids), the son of Al-Hussain ibn Ali Ibn Abi Talib. The mother of Sheikh Uthman is Hamilah bint Abu Bakr. Her father's name indicates that she comes from a family of deep faith in Islam. Abu Bakr's lineage reaches to the jurist Ahmed Ghazai which reaches back to Al-Hassan ibn Ali ibn Abi Talib. The lineage of Sirâj-ud-Dîn links to Muhammad, his family and his companions. (The phrase al-Hasani wal-Hussaini affirms his lineal descent from both Hasan ibn Ali and Hussein ibn Ali, the grandsons of Muhammad)

== Biography ==
Uthman Sirâj-ud-Dîn was born in Tawella, a village in the Ottoman Empire, into the House of Tavil, a Kurdish noble family. He was known for his habitual recitation of the Quran and memorization of the Quran and other religious knowledge. He journeyed to the plantation of Khurmal (Iraq) and the Kharabani School, where he frequented with students from all directions.

Thereafter he went to Baghdad by the way of Sulaymaniyah for the religious schools and the safety of the precincts of the Ottoman Empire. He studied various Islamic sciences there in the Madrasa of Abd al-Qadir al-Jilani. Sheikh Uthman Sirâj-ud-Dîn was the most important figure among Mavlana Halid's disciples even while Mevlana Khalid was still living in Baghdad. The two men knew each other as students of Islamic sciences, and they met once again in Baghdad in 1811 during Mevlana Khalid's five-month stay in the mosque complex of Abd al-Qadir al-Jilani, shortly after his return from India. It was then that Faqīh Uthman, who afterwards was known as Sirâj-ud-Dîn, was initiated to the path by Mawlana. After two years of spiritual training, at the age of 33, he was the first person to become a caliph of Mawlana. Sheikh Uthman began to seek the designation of jurists by seeking sacred knowledge, this was beloved term given by his spiritual guide Mawlana Khalid-i Baghdâdî.

Mawlana Khalid-i Baghdâdî said:

"I bore separation and calamity then arrived to various ranks, then it was taken from me by Uthman Sirâj-ud-Dîn," and added, "I planted and Uthman sowed."

He returned to Tawella and began to establish a strong base for the order, which became one of the most important centres for the Khalidi suborder in the whole Middle East and continued to be such until the 1950s. This centre not only contributed greatly in spreading the sufi teachings of the Naqshbandi order, but also produced a number of Sufi poets.

The usually laconic Haydari writes:

"He had many dazzling miracles and visible amazing supernatural deeds. The elite and common people testified to his sainthood. He became famous among the people, and many distinguished religious scholars and the most respected virtuous and pious followed the path under his hand. Many Jews and Christians were converted to Islam through his attentionand heed, followed the path in his lodge, and attained mystical states. The condition of this saint was mostly intoxication and majesty."

His fame spread throughout the Ottoman and Iranian Empires at the time. He had a great number of caliphs, deputies and affiliates from different regions.

== Death ==
‘Uthman Sirâj-ud-Dîn died on 6 Shawwal in the Islamic year 1283 (1867). He was 88 years old and was buried in a garden next to his house in Tawella.

== See also ==
- Muhammed Osman Sirajeddin
- Sheikh Ali Hisam-ad-Din Naqshbandi
