= House of Tavil =

- Parent family: Nu'aym
- Founded: 1291; 734 years ago
- Founder: Sheikh Uthman Sirâj-ud-Dîn
- Titles: Sheikh; Beg; Effendi
- Style: His Excellency
- Members: Uthman Sirâj-ud-Dîn Naqshbandi; Sheikh Ali Hisam-ad-Din Naqshbandi; Muhammed Bahaeddin al-Tavili; Muhammad Uthman Siraj al-Din; Omar Diya-ud-Din al-Tavili; Ahmed Shams-ud-Din al-Tavili; Muhammed Ala-ad-din al-Tavili

The House of Tavil, is a noble Kurdish household, which can be traced back to the 7th century. They were given the title “Sheikh”, in this case used when denoting a leader of a community. The prominent male members of the family use the title to this day.

== Name ==
The name of the family comes from the Ottoman Sultans name for the village of Tawella. The Tavil Sheikhs became the ruling sheikhs of their region and to this day carry the right to use the title of Sheikh. They are also called the Sheikhs of Tavil, Siraj-ud-Din family, Siraj-ud-din Sheikhs, or the Sheikhs of Hawraman.

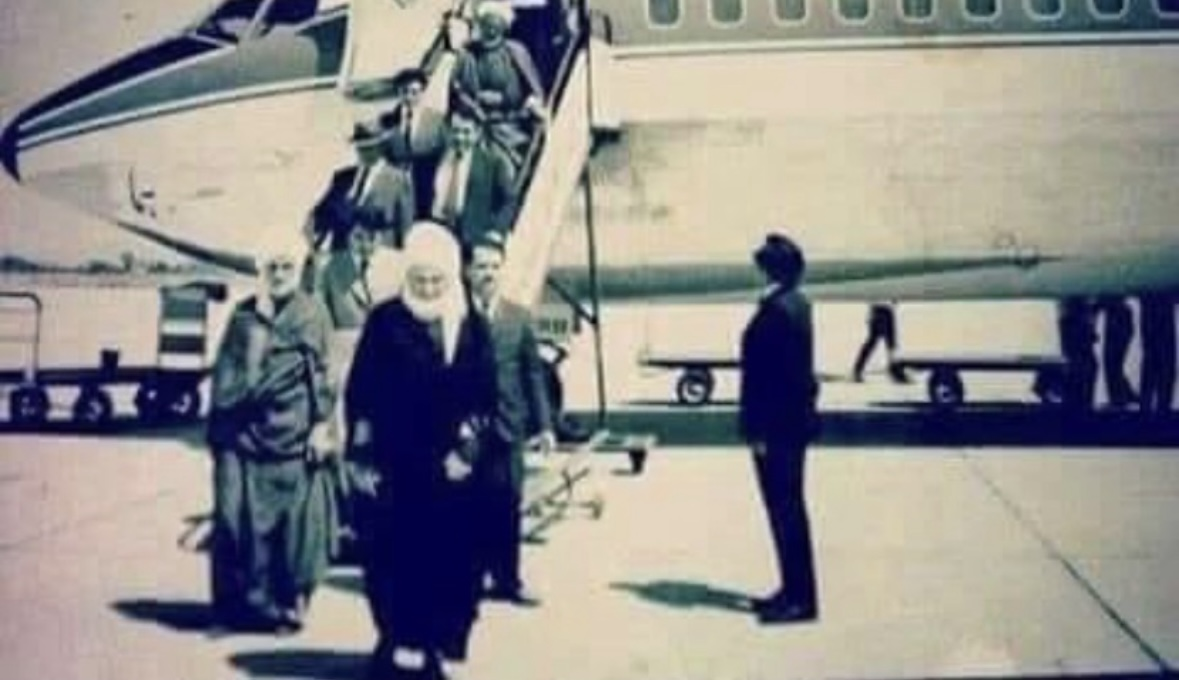
Sheikh arriving in Istanbul

== Lineage ==
=== Hissami Branch ===
* Khaled Beg (1756-1821)
  - Sheikh Uthman Sirâj-ud-Dîn Naqshbandi (1781-1867)
    - Sheikh Muhammad Baha-ad-Dín (1836-1881)
      - Sheikh Ali Hisam-ad-Din Naqshbandi (1861–1939)
        - Sheikh Jafar Muhammad Uthman (1863-1927)
          - Sheikh Sahib Hissami Naqshbandi (1888-1930)
            - Sheikh Jawad Hissami (1936-2015)
              - Sheikh Armand Hissami (b.1973)
                - Rodrigo Hissami (b.1998)

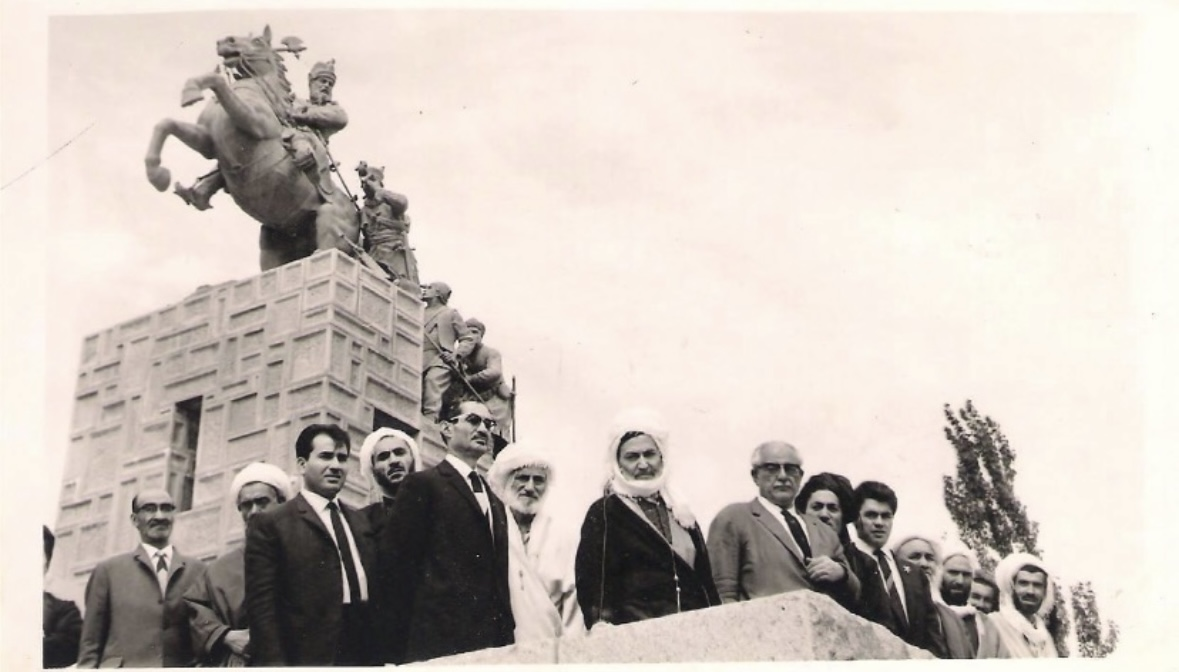
Sheikh Uthman with the ministers of the Turkish Government

== Social status and political ties ==
The sheikhs of Tavil established relationships with the Sultans of the Ottoman Empire. Because of their influence in Kurdistan, they had a vast number of followers. They provided military support for the Ottoman sultans. An example of this was during the ongoing war between Ottoman-Russia, where the Sheikhs of Tavil has sent thousands of people.

The Sheikhs of Tavil gained recognition through the Ottoman Empire and Qajar Empire (present day Iran). They supported and promoted moral excellence, planted hundreds of trees, cultivated gardens, and banned the cutting of trees across their lands.

Cecil John Edmonds, with the British intelligence at the time, explains in his book:

For the former, I conceived great respect, for their moral authority was invariably exercised actively in the interests of law and order. They were respected for their vast knowledge and high ethical principles ... showed how wide the influence of these Siraj-ud-Din sheikhs, who had the position of the Dukes and Popes in Europe; It was not uncommon for the disciple to travel 650 kilometers to gain the privilege of kissing the hand of their guide.

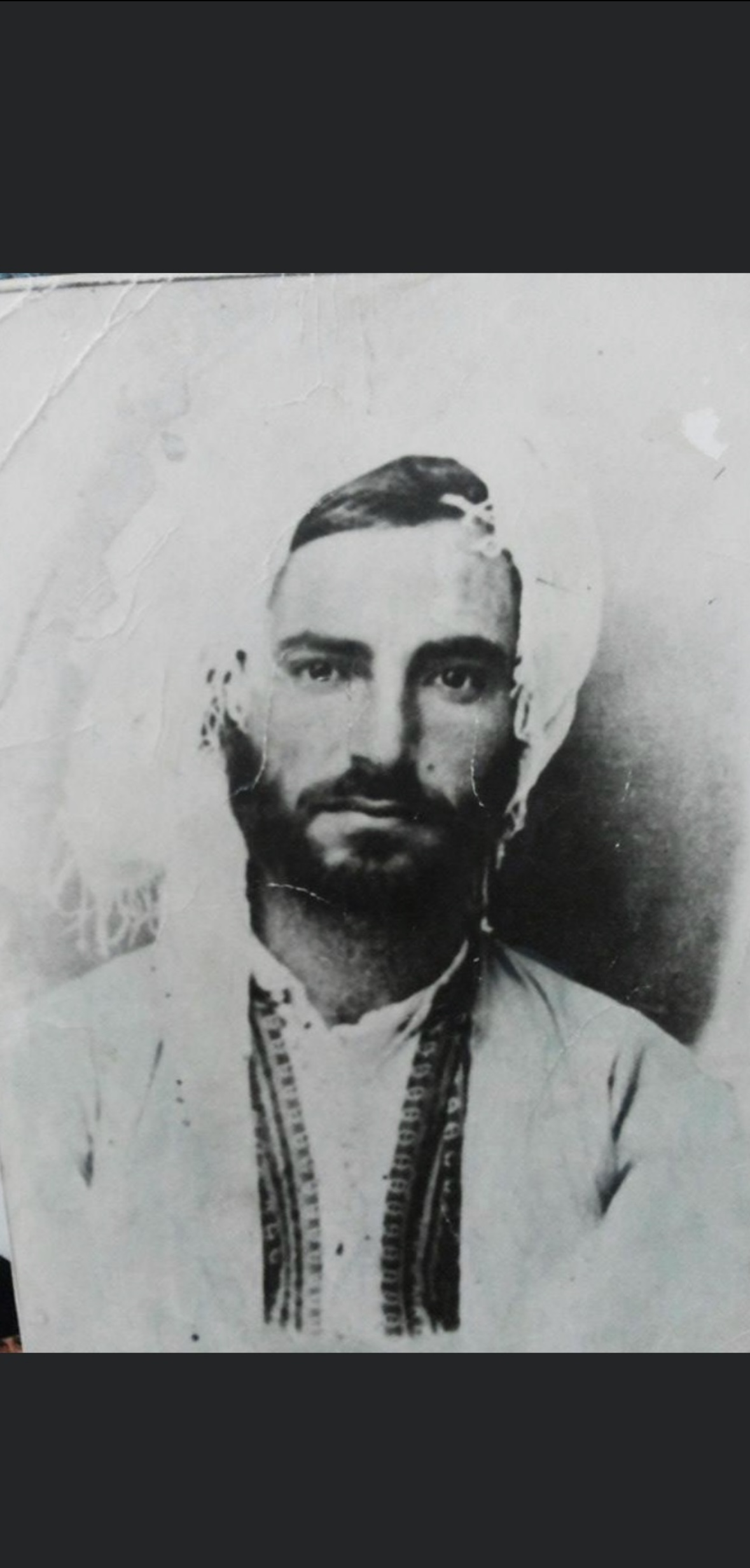
Sheikh Uthman (Young)

== Notable family members ==
Some of the most prominent family members include:

- Uthman Sirâj-ud-Dîn Naqshbandi
- Sheikh Ali Hisam-ad-Din Naqshbandi
- Muhammed Bahaeddin al-Tavili
- Muhammad Uthman Siraj al-Din
- Omar Diya-ud-Din al-Tavili
- Ahmed Shams-ud-Din al-Tavili
- Muhammed Ala-ad-din al-Tavili
- Sheikh Jawad Hissami

== Villages ==
The Tavil family established villages:

- Bahakon (Sheikh Ali Hisam-ad-Din Naqshbandi established this village, and it became known for his place of peace. Now the location of his shrine).
- Tebekel (This lodge is near to Zalam River in Tebekel village).
- Gulp (Established by Muhammed Bahâ-ad-Dîn. After his death, Sheikh Ali Hisam-ad-Din Naqshbandi has expanded it).

== Family Tree ==
The family tree of the Tavil Sheikhs

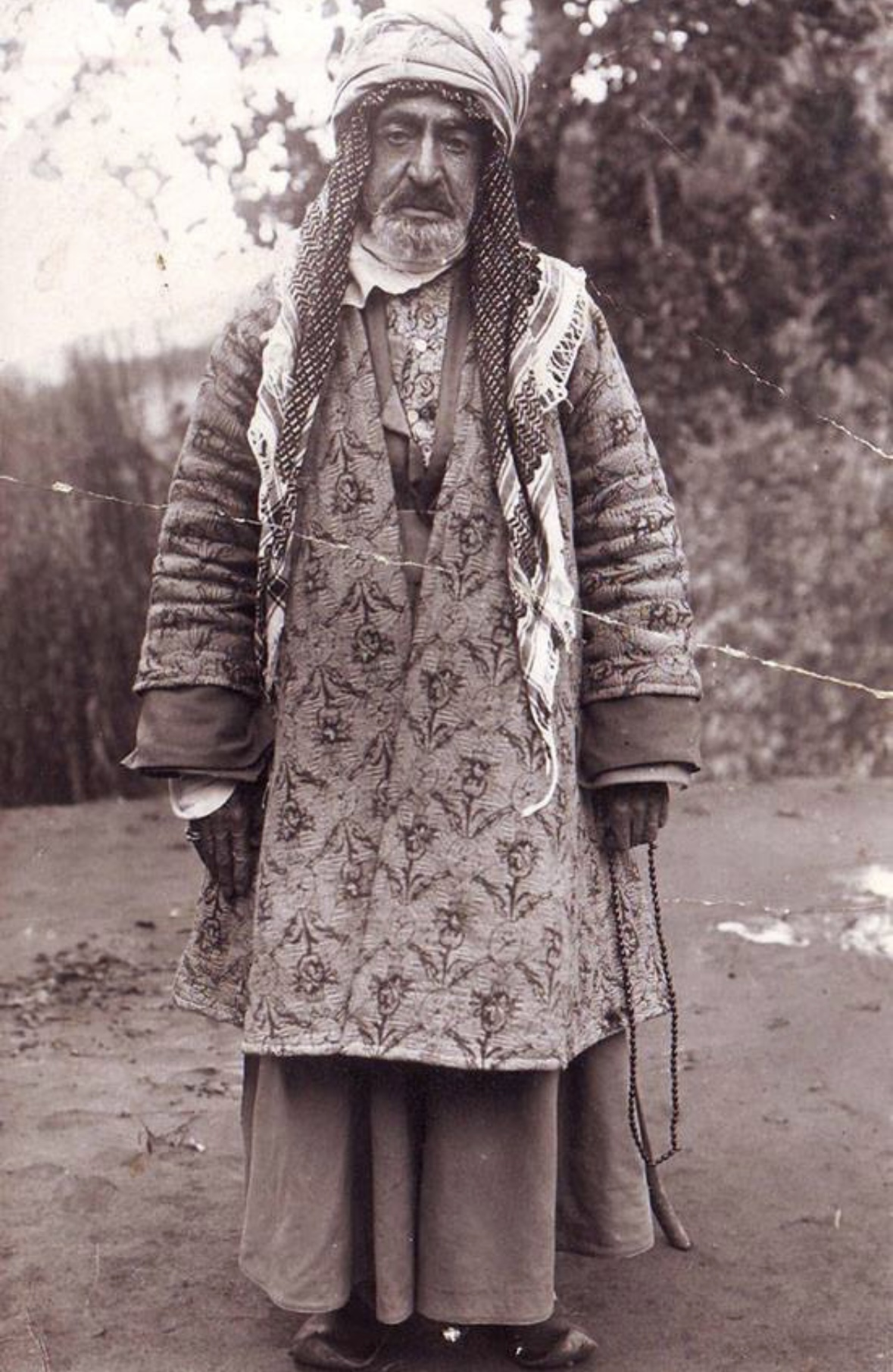
Sheikh Ali Hissami in Bahakon Village

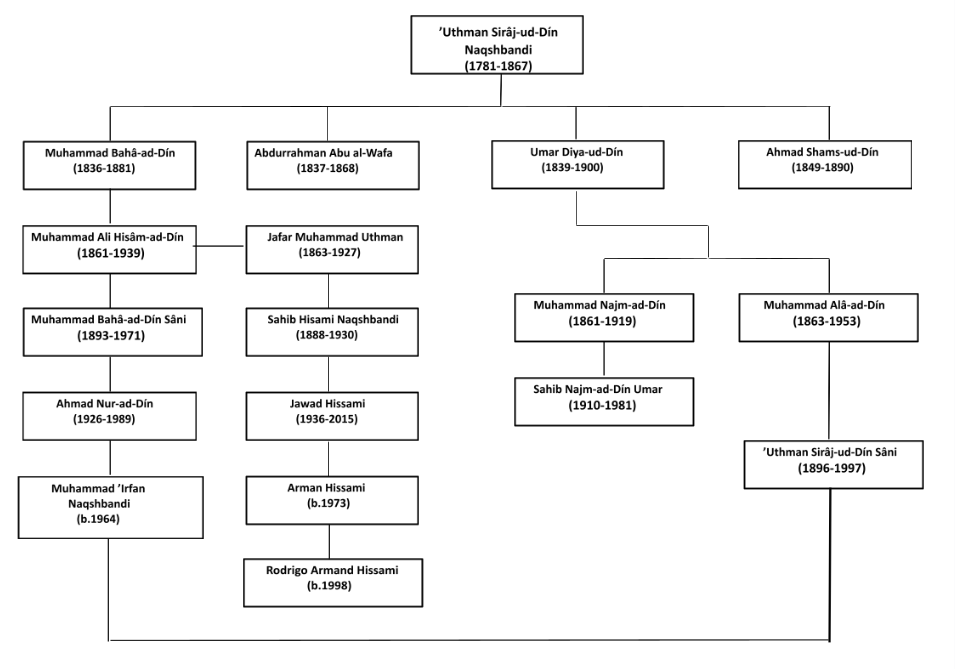
Family tree - of the Sheikhs of Tavil

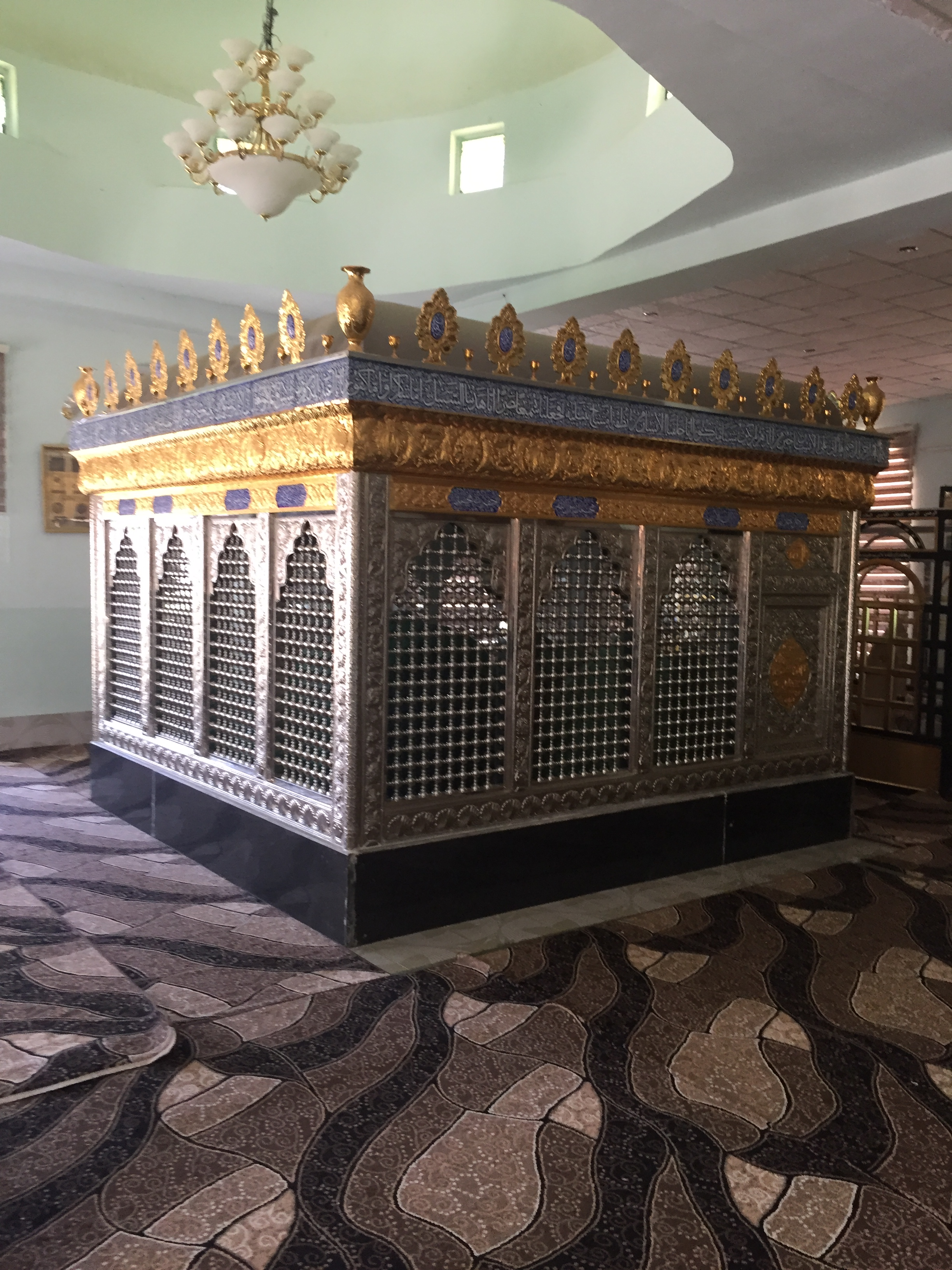
The Shrine of Sheikh Ali Hisam-ad-Din, in Bahakon Village
