= Jamaat-e-Islami (disambiguation) =

Jamaat-e-Islami may refer to:

- Jamaat-e-Islami, an Islamist movement
  - Jamaat-e-Islami Pakistan, a political party of Pakistan
  - Bangladesh Jamaat-e-Islami, a political party based in Bangladesh
  - Jamaat-e-Islami Hind, an Islamist organisation based in India
  - Jamaat-e-Islami Kashmir, an Islamist organisation based in Jammu and Kashmir, India
- Jamiat-e Islami, an Islamic political party of Afghanistan

== See also ==
- Al-Jama'a al-Islamiyya (disambiguation)
