= Muhammad Uthman Siraj al-Din =

Islamic scholar and Naqshbandi mystic

Muhammad Uthman Siraj al-Din]
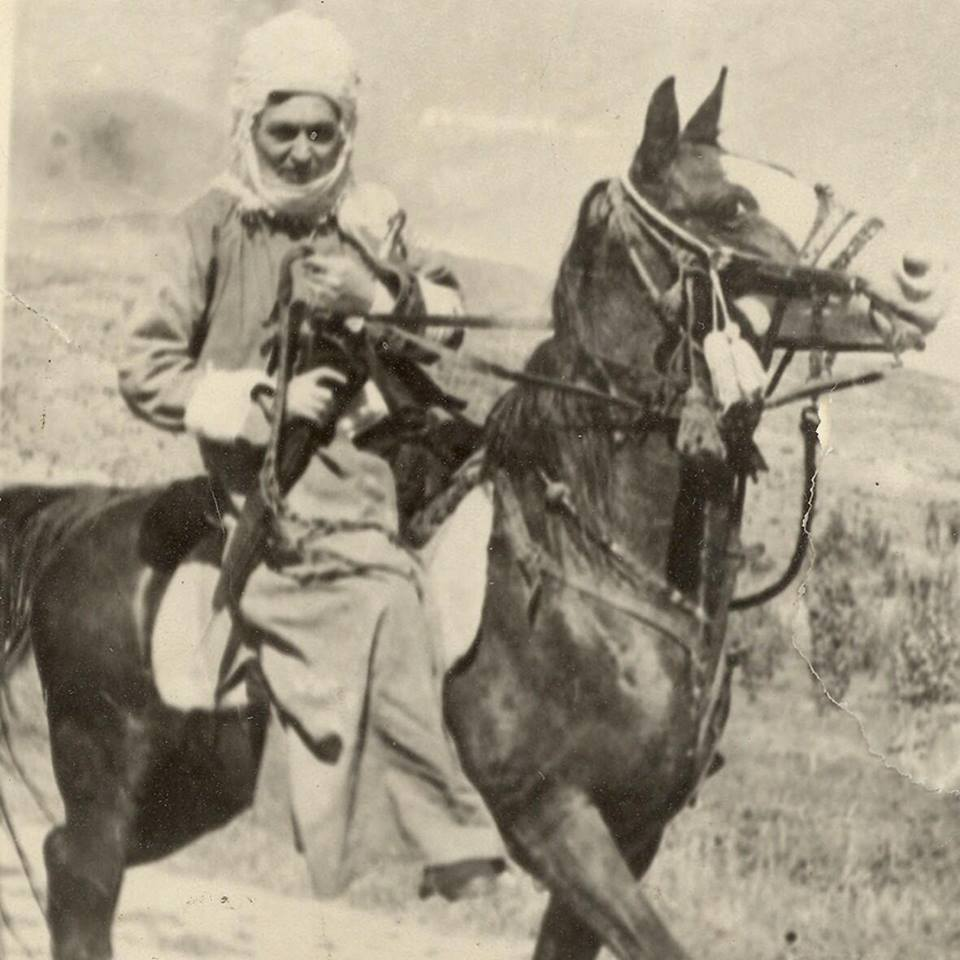
- Born: 1896; Biyara, Ottoman Empire
- Died: 30 January 1997 (aged 100–101); Istanbul, Turkey
- Title: Sheikh; Beg; Effendi
- Father: Muhammed Ala-ad-din al-Tavili
- Relatives: Sheikh Ali Hisam-ad-Din Naqshbandi; Muhammed Bahaeddin al-Tavili; Uthman Sirâj-ud-Dîn Naqshbandi
- Family: House of Tavil

Sheikh Muhammad Uthman Siraj al-Din Naqshbandi (Note: Arabic: محمد عثمان سراج الدين النقشبندي, romanized: Muḩammad ‘Uthmān Sirāj ad Dīn an Naqshbandī; Ottoman Turkish: محمد عثمان سراج الدین نقشبندی, romanized: Muḥammed ‘Os̱mân Sirâceddîn Naḳşibendî; Sorani Kurdish: محەمەد عوسمان سیراجەدین نەقشبەندی, romanized: Miḧemed ‘Usman Sîracedîn Neqşbendî; Persian: محمدعثمان سراج‌الدین نقشبندی, ALA-LC: Muḥammad ’Us̱mān Sirāj al-Dīn Naqshbandī, BGN/PCGN: Moḩammad ‘Os̄mān Serāj od Dīn Naqshbandī; Turkish: Muhammed Osman Siraceddin Nakşibendi) (1896 in Biyara, ￶ – 1997 in Istanbul, Turkey), known as Siraj al-Din al-Thani, (Note: Arabic: سراج الدين الثاني, romanized: Sirāj ad Dīn ath Thānī; Ottoman Turkish: سراج الدین ثانی, romanized: Sirâceddîn-i S̱ânî; Sorani Kurdish: سیراجەدینی دووەم, romanized: Sîracedînî Duwem; Persian: سراج‌الدین ثانی, romanized: Sirāj al-Dīn-i S̱āni, or سراج‌الدین دوم, Sirāj al-Dīn-i Duvvum; Turkish: Siraceddin-i Sani) was a Kurdish Islamic scholar, mystic of the Naqshbandi order, and leader of the Sipay Rizgari militant group. He belonged to one of the most influential noble households of the Middle East and Ottoman Empire, the Sheikhs of Tavil.

== Biography ==
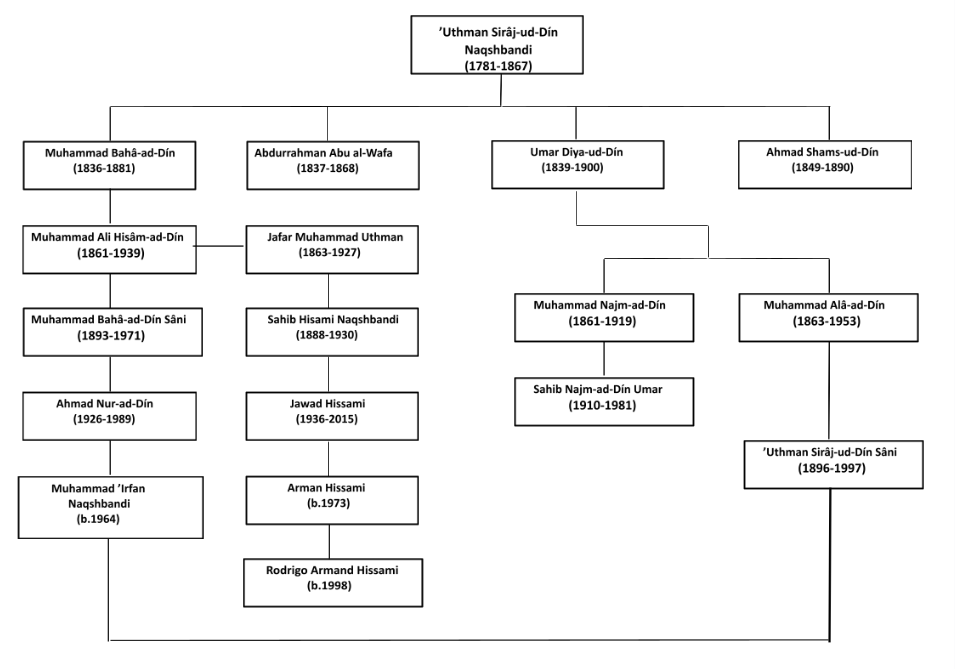
Family tree of the Sheikhs of Tavil, showing Muhammad Uthman Siraj al-Din in the bottom right corner

=== Early life ===
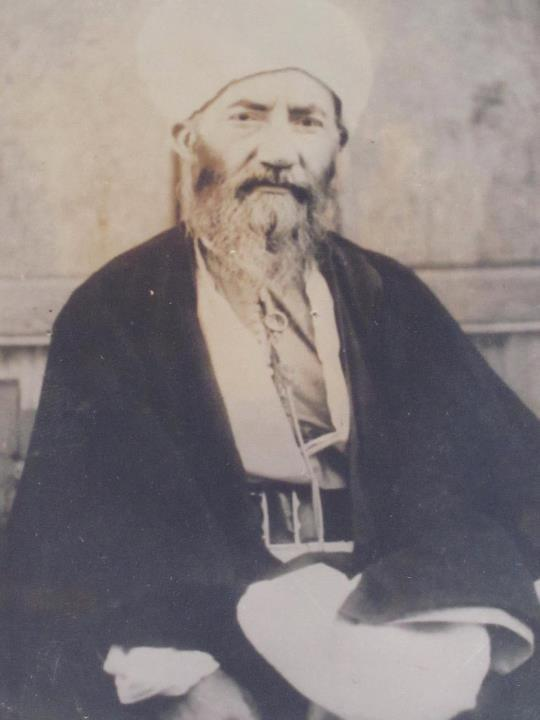
Muhammad Ala al-Din Naqshbandi, the father of Muhammad Uthman Siraj al-Din Naqshbandi

Muhammad Uthman Siraj al-Din, grandson of Umar Diya al-Din and son of Muhammad Ala al-Din, was descended from Muhammad ibn Abdullah through Husayn ibn Ali, making him a sayyid. As he was named Uthman in honor of his great-grandfather Uthman Siraj al-Din Naqshbandi, he was given the nickname "al-Thani", which means the second in Arabic. Muhammad Uthman Siraj al-Din was born in 1896 in the village of Biyara, to the Sheikhs of Tavil household, which claimed descent from the Arab Nu'aym tribe, although he was considered the highest Kurdish Naqshbandi leader. After studying religious sciences under the supervision and training of his father at a young age, he completed his education in the Arabic and Persian languages at the Duru and Biyara madrasas. Following the death of his father, he settled in the Biyara takiyya. He fled to Iran in 1959 after getting into conflict with the Iraqi government of Abd al-Karim Qasim. The Iranian government gave him asylum due to their strained relations with the Iraqi authorities, with SAVAK documents showing that the Iranian Pahlavi government viewed him as an ally and paid his pension.

=== Time in Iran ===
Muhammad Uthman Siraj al-Din brought back to life the Duru takiyya founded by his father in Iranian Kurdistan. As a result of his travels to different parts of Iran, he established a strong bond between the members of the Khalidi Naqshbandis in the Sunni Kurdish regions and the Talish region of Iran. He had a school built for 450 students providing education in the field of Islamic sciences. At the same time, more than 100 schools were built in the region under his leadership. There was an increase in the number and activities of Naqshbandi members during the twenty-year period he was in Iran. His sons also took up positions within the Iranian government during this time.

Strawberry farming was introduced to Iranian Kurdistan by Muhammad Uthman Siraj al-Din Naqshbandi in the 1960s.

=== Time in Turkey ===
Muhammad Uthman Siraj al-Din settled in Turkey in 1990 and held religious conversations with his domestic and foreign visitors in his guesthouse in the Hadımköy neighborhood of Istanbul. He sought remedies for the material and spiritual ailments of the people who came to him. He asked people to work hard to earn a halal livelihood and advised young people to learn useful knowledge and sciences. People came to him for important life decisions and he would guide them with divine inspiration. He was also an expert in herbal medicine and left a written record of it.

== Death ==
Muhammad Uthman Siraj al-Din died on 30 January 1997 and was buried in the garden of his takiyya in the Hadımköy neighborhood of Istanbul.

== Works ==
- Sirâcu'l Kulûb (Translation: Selahattin Alpay) ISBN 9789751625472
- Tafsīr Sūra Wa-t-Tīn
- Risāla al-Shihāb al-Thāqib
- Al-'Itiqād al-Rasīn wal-Yaqīn Billah

== See also ==
- Khalid al-Baghdadi

== Bibliography ==
- Osman Sirâceddîn-i Tavilî (en-nakşibendî, el-evvel) ve Ailesi (Osman Muhammed, 2017) ISBN 9786059261760
