= Rawti Shax =

Kurdish Salafi cyberterrorist group

- ڕەوتی شاخ
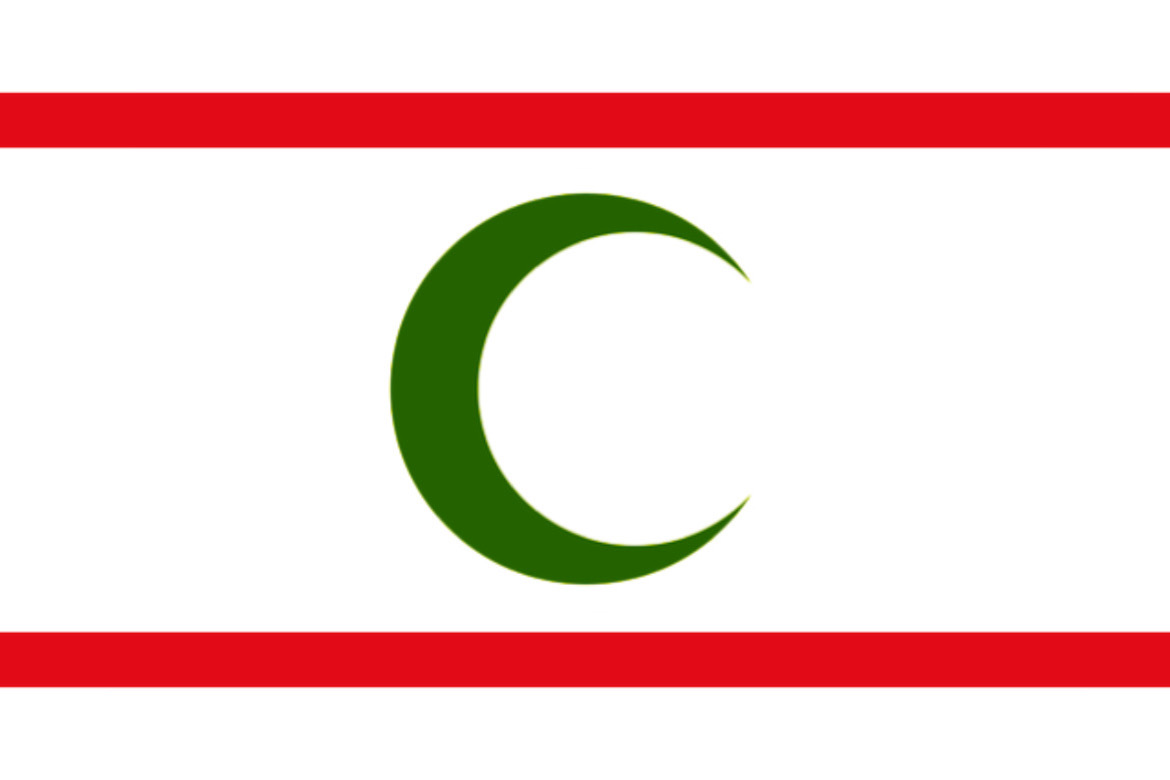
- Flag of Rawti Shax
- Leader: Mullah Krekar
- Dissolved: 2015
- Ideology: Qutbism; Salafi Jihadism; Wahhabism; Kurdish-Islamic nationalism Anti-Zionism
- Political position: Far-Right

Rawti Shax (Kurdish: ڕەوتی شاخ; "towards the mountain") was a Kurdish cyberterrorist offshoot of the jihadist group Ansar al-Islam.

== Dissolution ==
In October 2015, seventeen members, including the suspected leader, Norway-based Mullah Krekar, were arrested. All members were Kurds except for one Kosovar Albanian affiliate, and they were all arrested by an Italy-led, multi-nation sweep by police across Europe. The operation dismantled an integrated cell in Italy, Norway, the United Kingdom, Germany, Finland and Switzerland.

The network was accused of radicalising and recruiting fighters for the Islamic State, plotting attacks targeting Norwegian and British diplomats in the Middle East, and getting prepared to establish a second caliphate in Iraqi Kurdistan, after the Islamic Emirate of Kurdistan. It was also suspected of operating its own military training camps. The Italian counterterrorism chief Giuseppe Governale said that the operation was "the most important international police operation in Europe in 20 years".

== Arrests and warrants ==
A total of seventeen people, all but one of whom were Iraqi Kurds, were arrested or indicted in the raids; seven in Italy, four in the United Kingdom, three in Norway, two in Finland and one in Switzerland. 26 properties were searched in total, including in Germany, where officials seized electronic devices and documents.

Arrested in Italy:

- Abdulrahman Newroz, 36, Merano, Iraqi Kurd, suspected operative leader of the network, arrested in prison, trained at least five jihadists who travelled to Syria and Iraq
- Elvir Hoxhaj, 26, Merano, Kosovar Albanian, trained with jihadists in Syria financed by Italian ringleader in 2014
- Auch Mohamed Goran Fatah, 29, Merano, Iraqi Kurd, admitted contact with other indicted, allegedly in leadership circle
- Hama Mahmood Kamal, 30, Merano, Iraqi Kurd, driver for a transport company, ISIL-sympathiser
- Ali Salih Abdullah, 38, Bolzano, Iraqi Kurd, communications with Italian ringleader
- Ibrahim Jamal, 31, Bolzano, Iraqi Kurd, nicknamed "Hitler", fought with ISIL in 2012, previously lived in England, spread jihadist propaganda and talked about the need for terrorist attacks in Europe or against European interests as well as to free Mullah Krekar from prison
- Hasan Samal Jalal, 36, Bolzano, Iraqi Kurd, suspected to be ready to commit terrorist acts

Arrested in Norway:

- Mullah Krekar, suspected leader of the network, arrested in prison, original leader of Ansar al-Islam, allegedly pledged support to ISIL in 2014
- Karim Rahim Twana, 38, Fredrikstad, Kurdish Norwegian citizen, open supporter and close associate of Krekar
- Kamil Jalal Fatah, 42, Drammen, Iraqi Kurd, visits to Krekar in prison, communications with Italian ringleader

Arrest warrants in Finland:

- Male, joined ISIL, presumed killed in battle in March 2014

Arrest warrant in Switzerland:

- Male, joined the Al-Nusra Front in Syria in June 2014

The network was in addition believed to have cells in Sweden, Greece, Syria, Iran and Iraq.

In March 2016 4 suspects previously arrested in the United Kingdom were released without charges, after winning a court case against their extradition to Italy.

== Extraditions to Italy ==
Several people have been extradited to Italy:

- Mullah Krekar was extradited in March 2020. He is serving a prison sentence as of 2020.
- A 43-year old man was extradited from Norway in October 2020; he is Kurdish but has a Norwegian citizenship. However, media claimed in 2019 that his Norwegian citizenship had been recalled and he currently remains stateless.

== See also ==
- White Flags
