= Omar Gulpi =

Member of Kurdistan Parliament

Omar Abdullah Fatah
- عمر عبدالله فتاح

Member of the Kurdistan Region Parliament
- In office 2019–2023

Personal details
- Born: 1977 (age 48–49) Avroman, Halabja Governorate, Iraq
- Party: Kurdistan Justice Group
- Occupation: Politician
- Profession: Educator, politician
- Committees: Finance and Economic Affairs Committee

Omar Abdullah Fatah (Kurdish: عومەر عەبدوڵڵا فەتاح, Arabic: عمر عبدالله فتاح), most commonly known as Omar Gulpi, is a Kurdish politician and member of the Kurdistan Justice Group (KJG). He was born in 1977 in Hawraman, Halabja Governorate, Iraq.

Gulpi holds a Bachelor's degree in Statistics and an MBA specializing in Human Resources Management.

As a member of the Kurdistan Region Parliament's Fifth Term (2019–2023)

== Early life ==
Omar Gulpi, born in 1977 in the city of Halabja, Kurdistan, was raised in a family deeply affected by the sociopolitical struggles of the Kurdish people. He grew up amidst the tragic history of Kurdish oppression, including the brutal Halabja chemical attack in 1988, which had a lasting impact on his family and his worldview. In 1989, Omar experienced a personal loss with the execution of two of his brothers by the Baathist regime, an event that shaped his early resolve to fight for the Kurdish cause.

== Education ==
- BA in Statistics, college of Administration and economy (2003).
- MBA in management, specialized in human resources management (2014).

== Career ==
Omar’s career has been marked by a combination of academic, political, and social activism roles. He initially embarked on a teaching career, becoming an influential academic and lecturer in several Kurdish universities, including the University of Human Development (UHD) and the University of Sulaymaniyah (UOS).

He later transitioned into journalism and political activism. Omar Gulpi held key political positions in the Kurdistan Region’s government. One of his most notable roles was his appointment as the chairman of the General Directorate of Social Care in Sulaimani from 2015 to 2020. During this time, he worked extensively to improve social services for vulnerable populations, including orphans, the elderly, and individuals with disabilities.

In recent years, Omar Gulpi was elected as a member of the Kurdistan Parliament, where he has continued to advocate for the Kurdish people’s rights, focusing on social care, human development, and political reforms in the Kurdistan region.

- 2015 - 2020, chairman of General directorate of social care & development, Slemani Governorate
- 2008 - 2009, Kurdistan Students Organization
- 2003 - 2014, high school teacher
- 2014 - 2015, trainer at Slemani Directorate of Teacher Training, lecturer at UHD, UOS and Polytechnic University
- Member of International and Kurdistan Journalists Union
- 2019 - 2023, Member of Kurdistan parliament
- 2024–Present, Head of List within Sulaymaniyah Governorate for KJG

== Political Views and Activism ==
Omar Gulpi is the head of Social Development in Suleimaniyah, Kurdistan Region. On December 3, in honor of the International Day for Persons with Disabilities, he issued a message congratulating people with disabilities across the Kurdistan Region. Gulpi expressed regret that their needs could not be fully met, citing the region's financial challenges as a barrier to providing comprehensive support. He pledged to continue his work in serving people with disabilities and expressed hope for improved conditions in the coming year.

=== Anti-LGBT views ===
Gulpi is recognized in the Kurdistan Region for promoting homophobia and supporting actions against the local LGBT community. He has publicly advocated for legislation imposing penalties, including imprisonment and fines, against LGBT+ individuals, presenting this as part of his stance on cultural values. This approach contrasts with the humanitarian image he seeks to project. In 2021, he was a prominent figure in an anti-LGBT campaign led by the Kurdistan Justice Group (KJG), during which he disseminated misinformation and negative rhetoric about the LGBT+ community. This campaign contributed to increased incidents of violence and further setbacks in LGBT+ human rights in the region. This lobbying led to the closure of the only openly LGBT+ organization operating on the ground, Rasan.

== Published Works ==
- Corruption (گەندەڵی) - Published in 2014
- Kaywaan (کەیوان) - Published in 2024
