= Khider Kosari =

Kurdish Islamist rebel and poet

Shaheed Khider Kosari
- خدر کۆساری
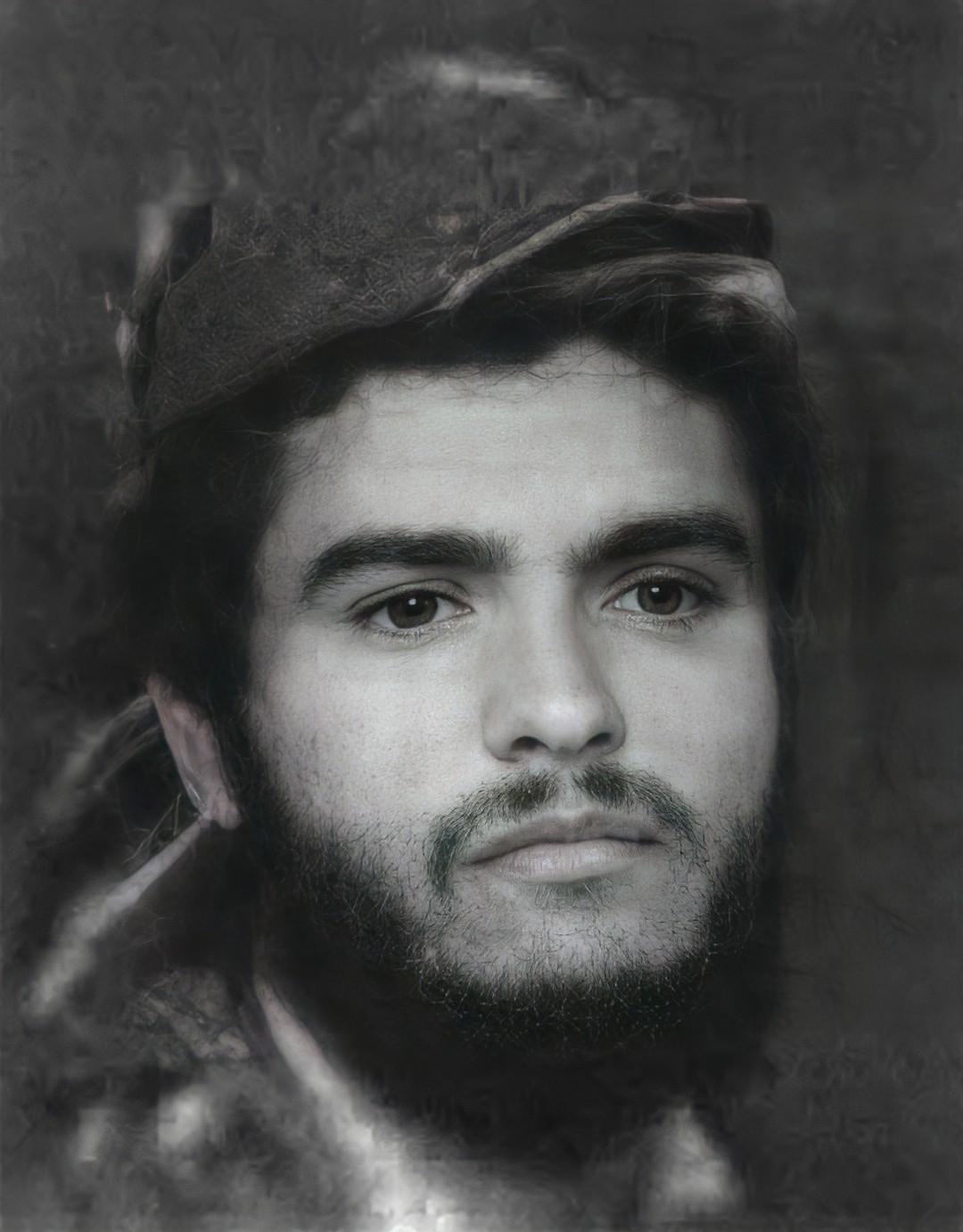
- Born: 1969; Ranya, Ba'athist Iraq
- Died: December 27, 1993 (aged 23–24); Ranya, Iraq
- Burial place: Mountainside of Ranya
- Military career
- Allegiance: Kurdish mujahideen
- Known for: Poetry
- Conflicts: Iran–Iraq War; 1991 Iraqi uprisings

Khider Mohammad Rasheed, better known as Khider Kosari (Kurdish: خدر کۆساری; 1969–1993) was a Kurdish Islamist rebel and poet.

== Early life ==
Kosari was born in 1969 in Ranya, Kurdistan Region and was not nationalistic or religious during his upbringing, but during the Iran–Iraq War he was recruited by Ali Bapir's faction of the Kurdistan Islamic Movement, which was affiliated with the larger Kurdish mujahideen movement, to fight against Saddam Hussein, and he turned into a Kurdish nationalist and radical Muslim, where he later became known as their poet. He got married in 1986 and had a daughter and a son. In late 1987, he wrote his first poem called "Nigari Khudan", and he used poetry to recruit people. He played a major role in the 1991 Iraqi uprisings, and he read his poems from the loudspeaker of the Great Mosque of Ranya. He recorded videos of his poetry in Sorani Kurdish, most of the time on mountains during the war, which the videos can be found online.

== Assassination ==
On, December 27, 1993, 2 years after the 1991 Iraqi uprisings, Kosari was assassinated by the PUK after their crackdown on the Kurdistan Islamic Movement's leadership. Kosari and two friends, including Ali Bapir's brother Wahid Bapir, fled to a nearby village in the mountains. After a day spent hiding in a villager's house, Wahid and Kosari chose to leave. Shortly after leaving the village, Kosari changed his mind and returned by himself. As PUK-Peshmerga entered the house where he was hiding during a raid, he attempted to escape, but was shot. The PUK Peshmerga soldiers found him bleeding on the ground but still alive, they fired a kill shot and left, but Kosari still survived. After hearing about the raid, Wahid Bapir returned to check on him. On his deathbed, Kosari begged Wahid, "Bring the recorder, I have more poems left in my chest." The next day, the villager who helped hide Kosari loaded his dead body in a tractor to be returned to his family in Ranya. His family buried him that same day, in the mountains, where they held an Islamic funeral for him.

== See also ==
- Kurdish mujahideen
- Iraqi Kurdish Civil War
