= Ali Abdulaziz Halabji =

Kurdish Islamic scholar and politician

Personal details
- Born: December 28, 1929 Prisi Saroo, Halabja, Mandatory Iraq (present-day Iraq)
- Died: March 17, 2007 (aged 77) United Kingdom
- Resting place: Halabja
- Children: 4; including Tahsin
- Parent: Mullah Abdulaziz Halabji
- Occupation: Religious leader, politician, militant leader

Military service
- Allegiance: Kurdish mujahideen
- Branch/service: Kurdistan Islamic Movement
- Rank: Co–leader
- Battles/wars: 1983–1986 Kurdish rebellions in Iraq

Ali Abdulaziz Halabji (December 28, 1929 – March 17, 2007) was an Iraqi Kurdish Islamic scholar and rebel militant leader and co-founder as well as second leader of the Kurdistan Islamic Movement.

== Life ==
He was born on December 28, 1929, in the village of Prisi Saroo in Halabja to a religious family. At the age of seven, he studied the Qur'an and Sharia law. He studied with his father, Abdulaziz. In 1953, he became an Islamic teacher at his local Mosque alongside his brother Osman Abdulaziz. In 1959 he became the Imam of the Azabani Mosque in Sulaymaniyah, and in 1961 he became the Imam of the Mohammed Pasha Mosque in Halabja. In 1962, he became the director of the Islamic Institute in Halabja. He was later exiled by the Ba'athist Iraqi government to Anbar, Fallujah, Ziqar, and Baghdad for leading the Kurdish mujahideen during the 1983–1986 Kurdish rebellions in Iraq on the Kurdish rebel side. He later returned to Halabja.

== Political career ==
In 1987, after his exile, he participated in the establishment of the Kurdistan Islamic Movement and became its deputy leader and head of the military wing. In 1999, he became the leader of the Kurdistan Islamic Movement. On August 8, 2003, he and his brother Mullah Omar Abdulaziz and several bodyguards were arrested by a large US force at his home in Halabja and spent several months in prison for their involvement in the creation of the Islamic Emirate of Kurdistan. After his release, he went to the UK for treatment due to deteriorating health, and he died in the UK on 17 March 2007, and was brought back to Halabja and buried there.
