= White Flags =

Kurdish Salafi insurgent group formed in 2017

- Kurdish: ئاڵا سپییەکان
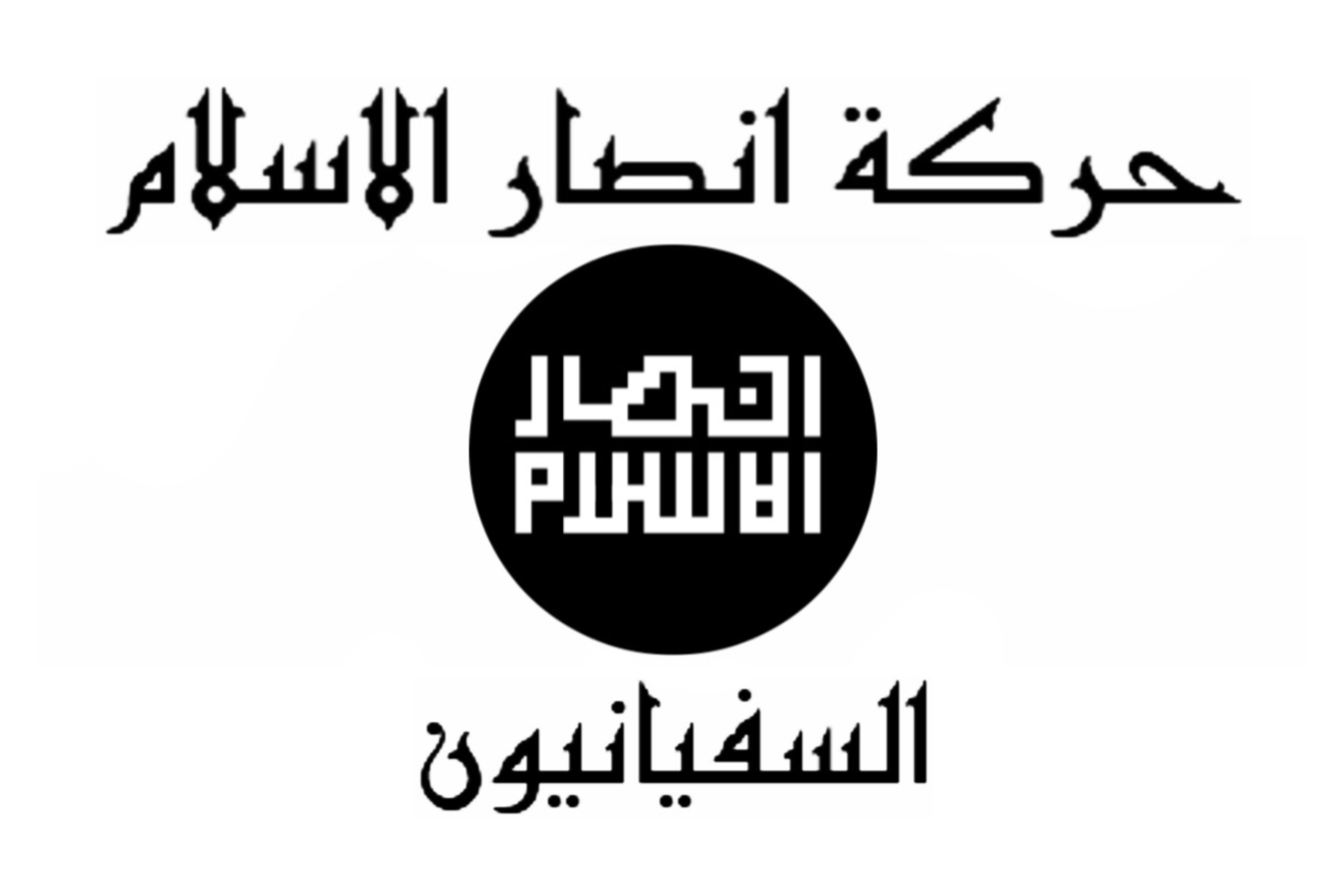
- Variant flag of the White Flags
- Leaders: Hiwa Chor; Khaled al-Moradi; Ahmed Hokoma; Assi al-Qawali (POW)
- Dates active: 2017–2019
- Headquarters: Tuz Khurmatu
- Active regions: Northern Iraq: Kirkuk Governorate; Saladin Governorate; Diyala Governorate
- Size: 500–1,000
- Part of: Ansar al-Islam (Iraqi gov. claim)
- Wars: the War in Iraq (2013–2017) and the Islamic State insurgency in Iraq (2017–present)

The White Flags (Kurdish: ئاڵا سپییەکان, romanized: Alên Spî), also known as Sufyaniyyun (Kurdish: سوفیانیون, romanized: Sufyanîyûn), was an alleged Kurdish militant group in Iraq, and an offshoot of Ansar al-Islam, based in the disputed territories of northern Iraq. Their first purported appearance was during the Battle of Kirkuk in October 2017, when the federal government regained control of disputed territories which were taken by the Kurdistan Regional Government.

== Ideology ==
Iraqi civil and military officials as well as regional experts, claim that the White Flags are a Kurdish nationalist or separatist faction which was founded in response to the Iraqi takeover of Kirkuk, with its members referring to themselves as "the Kurdish resistance". American defense and military officials also said that it "appears to be a union of Kurdish terrorists and former ISIS fighters", or a union of Kurdish ISIS and Ansar al-Islam remnants. Iraqi intelligence, and Bill Roggio, said that the group appeared to be an attempt at rebranding by a faction of Ansar al-Islam, or even a local Kurdish movement to oppose the Iraqi government. The Iraqi government said that the White Flags are a front organization of Ansar al-Islam.

All those claims was supported by the fact that the White Flags leader and founder, Assi al-Qawali, was a religious figure and a staunch KDP supporter. He also had close ties to Mullah Krekar. The variant flag of the White Flags had "Ansar al-Islam movement" written on top of it.

== Organisation and tactics ==
The White Flags are considered to be a terrorist organization by Iraqi officials. In late 2017, an Iraqi Turkmen MP accused Kurdish leaders of supporting the group. This was denied by the Kurdistan Regional Government. The group's leader Hiwa Chor, a one-eyed militant, was a former member of al-Qaeda in Iraq but disagreed with their international Caliphate plans so he left the organization. The group uses various guerilla tactics such as ambushes and utilizes IEDs. It also uses mortars and rockets. The group operates in and around Tuz Khurmatu and has launched frequent attacks on oil fields and routes in the area. The White Flags usually target establishments affiliated with Turkmen or Shia Arab political parties.

Kurds generally believed that the Iraqi government had entirely fabricated the existence of the White Flags, or at least heavily exaggerated it. Whether or not the group actually existed, the group disappeared in 2018 when the situation in the disputed territories stabilised.

== See also ==
- Ansar al-Islam
- Kurdistan Brigades
- Rawti Shax
