= İbrahim Parlak =

Kurdish immigrant to the United States of America

- Born: 1962 (age 63–64); Gaziantep, Turkey
- Years active: 1978–1991
- Political party: Kurdistan Workers' Party

İbrahim Parlak (born 1962 in Gaziantep) is a Kurdish politician who has been accused by the United States Department of Homeland Security of being a former member and high official of the Kurdistan Workers' Party (PKK).

== Early life and education ==
Parlak grew up into a Kurdish family and had nine siblings. His father was a farmer. During first grade in school, he was punished by the teacher for having spoken Kurdish at home. He attended high school in Gaziantep where he campaigned for the Kurdish rights movement. After having been imprisoned during a rally at the age of sixteen, he migrated to Germany where he lived for seven years.

== Europe and the PKK ==
It was in Europe where Parlak then joined the political wing of the PKK and organized festivals in their support. Aiming to join his family in Turkey, he travelled to Lebanon to get training in a camp of the PKK. After eight months, he led a team of five militants over Syria to Turkey where they were stopped by a border patrol. A skirmish in which three of his colleagues were injured and two Turkish soldiers died ensued and he managed to flee. A few months later he was captured and imprisoned for 1 year and 4 months after which was released. He then left Turkey for the United States where he applied for political asylum in 1991.

== United States ==
He learned English and opened a restaurant in Harbert, Michigan. However, under pressure on the Clinton Administration from Turkey to support American anti-terrorism efforts, U.S. State Department retroactively labeled the PKK a "terrorist organization" in 1997. The charges against him were for lying about not being affiliated with a terrorist group on his asylum application. Despite applying 5 years prior when the PKK was not declared a terrorist organization. Post 9/11, he was taken into custody by the U.S. Department of Homeland Security on July 29, 2004. He served 10 months in a Michigan County jail. Parlak subsequently won a writ of habeas corpus and was released from prison on June 3, 2005. The court had originally decided to deport him based on the government's case.

On July 17, 2018, an immigration judge ruled that Parlak could retain his American residency per the United Nations Convention against Torture. The decision was reaffirmed in 2024.
