= Assi al-Qawali =

Iraqi-Kurdish insurgent leader

Assi al-Qawali ئاسی قەوالی
- Born: Tuz Khurmatu, Iraq
- Allegiance: Peshmerga; Kurdistan Democratic Party; White Flags
- Service years: 2015–2017
- Conflicts: War in Iraq (2013–17); 2017 Iraqi–Kurdish conflict; ISIL insurgency (2017–present)

Assi al-Qawali is an Iraqi-Kurdish insurgent leader and a former Peshmerga volunteer that is allegedly the leader of the White Flags which is believed to be a splinter group of Ansar al-Islam by the government of Iraq and some observers.

== Biography ==
=== Background ===
Qawali was born to a Sunni Kurdish family from Tuz Khurmatu, Saladin Governorate. He came from a poor background, and lived by a river which he would draw water from and transport with his tractor to other areas to earn an income. He was described as a calm individual, and reportedly held ties to Mullah Krekar an Islamist cleric and founder of Ansar al-Islam. Qawali was also a member the Kurdistan Democratic Party and a supporter of Masoud Barzani as well as a volunteer of its armed branch Peshmerga, and carried out attacks with his supporters against Iraqi government forces and allied paramilitary groups by riding horses, motorcycles and 4-wheel drive vehicles and launching the attacks from the Hamrin Mountains. Between 2015 and 2016 he participated in riots in his hometown Tuz Khurmatu and allegedly burned down houses belonging to the Shia Iraqi Turkmen.

=== Militant activity ===
In April 2016 he took part in clashes against Iraqi Security Forces, and Kurdish media outlets showed photos of him removing the flag of Kata'ib Hezbollah afterwards. During the break out of fighting between Iraq's government and Kurdish forces in October 2017, he attacked the Popular Mobilization Forces headquarters in Tuz Khurmato after the arrival of the Iraqi Army in the town. In December 2017, he reportedly established the White Flags, and led the group in firing mortars and rockets at Turkmen PMF positions in Tuz Khurmato which Iraqi security forces claim to have resulted in the death of two civilians and the injury of several others.

In an interview with the Saudi-based Arab News, an associate of Qawali, a Peshmerga commander, said regarding him "Sheikh Mujahid Assi is leading an armed group in Tuz Khurmatu as a part of the Kurdish popular resistance against the Shiite terrorist militias", and attributed rocket attacks in the town to Qawali. He and the White Flags had also been accused of executing truck drivers on a road between Baghdad and Kirkuk, by Iraqi media.

In response to the attacks attributed to Qawali, the mayor of Tuz Khurmato said regarding him and the group he reportedly leads, “These are extremist groups who were oppressed and prevented (by the Kurdish authorities) from working before,” adding “They are Kurdish militants (and are) joined by Daesh (ISIL) militants who fled the neighboring areas,” and “They are sleeper cells that were waiting for the right time and place to resume their activities.”

On 28 December 2017, he was reportedly arrested by Iraqi security forces along with several other members of the White Flags for firing rockets and mortars at Turkmen Popular Mobilization Forces command centers in Kirkuk.

== See also ==
- Iraqi-Kurdish conflict
- Iran–PJAK conflict
- SDF insurgency in Northern Aleppo
