= Ali Hisam-ad-Din Naqshbandi =

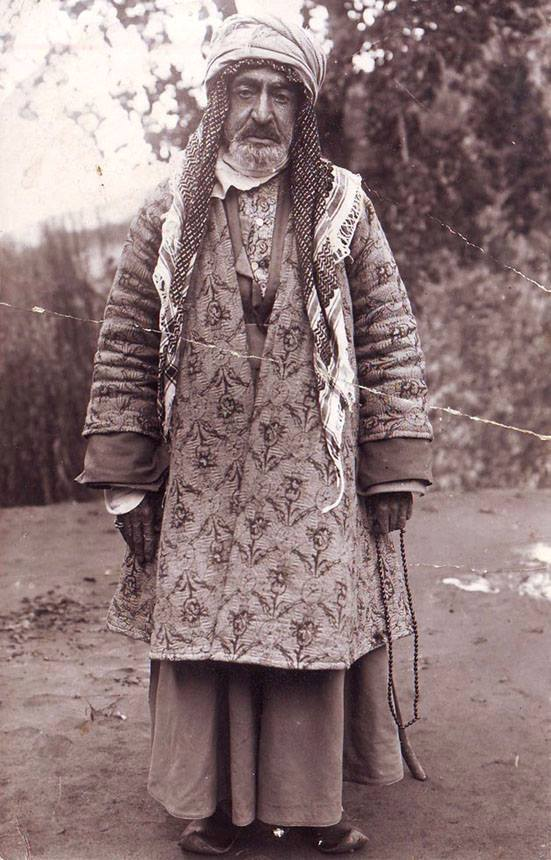
- Born: 1861; Tawella, Ottoman Empire
- Died: 1939 (aged 77–78); Bahakon
- Title: Shah; Sheikh; Beg; Effendi
- Father: Muhammed Bahaeddin al-Tavili
- Family: House of Tavil

Shah Ali Hisâm-ad-Dîn Naqshbandî (Arabic: حسام الدين نقشبندي, Persian: علي حسام الدین نقشبند, Turkish: Şâh Ali Hüsâmeddîn) also known as Hâzrat-i Shâh and Bâbâ Ali (b. 1861 Tawella, Iraq / d. 1939 Bahakon, Iraq) was a 19th-century sufi, awliya' and Islamic scholar born in Tawella village which was part of Ottoman Empire lands at that time. He is sayyid and sherif also a descendant of Sayyid Battal Gazi. Muhammad Ali Hisâm-ad-Dîn is the grandson of Uthman Sirâj-ud-Dîn Naqshbandi of Tawella who is the first caliph of Mawlânâ Khâlid al-Baghdadî in Sulaymaniyah. He belonged to one of the most influential noble households of the Middle East and Ottoman Empire, the Sheikhs of Tavil.

== Biography ==
Muhammad Ali Hisâm-ad-Dîn was raised into a home with an environment of `ilm, piety and `ibāda. He studied the various Islamic Sciences in Arabic and Persian language. His grandfather Uthman Sirâj-ud-Dîn testified when he was young that a very great power would appear in him.

In 1867, he lost his grandfather when was 6 years old. After losing his father Muhammed Bahâ-ad-Dîn in 1881, at the age of 20 he took over his duties started to engage in advising and guiding the people. Muhammad Ali Hisâm-ad-Dîn Naqshbandi considered to be the greatest scholar of his time, had immerse knowledge in the fields of hadith, tafsir, fiqh. He was able to speak Turkish, Arabic, Persian, Hawrami, Zazaki and also some provincial languages and regional dialects.

Shah Hisâm-ad-Dîn was the one having the largest successors among the Naqshbandî Sheikhs in Iraq. Tawella Madrasah, he was the Sheikh of it, placed in Tawella township of Halabja today and it had been one of the most effective Naqshbandî centers in Iraq. With Tawella Madrasah and new lodges opening depending on it, the spread of Naqshbandî was provided on the both borders of Iraq-Iran and some region of Anatolia and Middle East.

Afterwards, he moved to Bahakon village and established a new lodge, settled there for a while and continued teaching. Shah Ali Hisâm-ad-Dîn had approximately 24.000 men at his command, approximately 9000 of his own dervishes, and his Murids. His influence transcends national borders as well as ethnic divisions: Iranians, Turkish, Arabs, British, Egyptian, central Muslims, middle east, other nations. He was also the caliphate of those 9 tariqahs; Naqshbandiyyah, Qadiriyyah, Rifa'iyya, Suhrawardiyya, Kubrawiyya, Badawiyyah, Shadhili, Chishtiya

(The family of Uthman Sirâj-ud-Dîn Naqshbandi has sent thousands of people to Ottoman Empire for protecting lands against Russia while during the war ongoing between Ottoman-Russia)

=== Tawella ===
Tawella is located about 100 km to the east of Sulaymaniyah. It is known as the heart of Hawraman. It is surrounded by mountains on all sides, which ensure perfect climatic conditions. It is covered by snow during autumn and winter. It is also home to the shrines of Uthman Sirâj-ud-Dîn Naqshbandi who lived and died there between 1781-1867 and his grandson Shah Muhammad Ali Hisâm-ad-Dîn Naqshbandi.

=== Lodges ===
- Bahakon Lodge (He established this lodge in Bahakon village, meanwhile he was also staying at Tawella lodge)
- Tebekel Lodge (This lodge is near to Zalam River in Tebekel village)
- Gulp Lodge (This lodge had established by his father Muhammed Bahâ-ad-Dîn. After his death, Shah Ali Hisâm-ad-Dîn has expanded it)

== Character ==
He was well known as a person with great character, acted in a manner, honorable, courageous, compassionate and ethical. He supported and promoted moral excellence, has planted hundreds of trees, cultivated gardens and banned cutting of trees across the country.

"For the former I conceived great respect, for his moral authority was invariably exercised actively in the interests of law and order." - Cecil J. Edmonds, 1921

== Death ==
Shah Muhammad Ali Hisâm-ad-Dîn died in 1939 and was buried in Bahakon village.
