= Kurdistan Justice Group =

Political party in Iraqi Kurdistan

Kurdistan Justice Group Komelî Dadgerî Kurdistan کۆمەڵی دادگەری كوردستان
- Leader: Ali Bapir
- Founded: 31 May 2001; 25 years ago
- Split from: Kurdistan Islamic Movement
- Headquarters: Erbil, Iraqi Kurdistan
- Ideology: Kurdish-Islamism; Social conservatism
- Political position: Right-wing
- Religion: Sunni Islam
- Colours: Orange
- Seats in the Council of Representatives of Iraq: 1 / 329
- Seats in the Kurdistan Region Parliament: 3 / 100

Party flag

Website
- komalnews.org

The Kurdistan Justice Group (Kurdish: کۆمه‌ڵی دادگەری کوردستان, romanized: Komellî Dadgerî Kurdistan), colloquially called Komell, formerly the Kurdistan Islamic Group (Kurdish: گرووپی ئیسلامی کورد, romanized: Koma Îslamî ya Kurd), is a movement in Iraqi Kurdistan established in May 2001 by Ali Bapir, a former leader of the Kurdistan Islamic Movement and a former deputy of the Islamic Emirate of Kurdistan.

== Policy ==
Regarding their position in relation to other political parties, in a January 2003 interview Ali Bapir stated:

"Our policy is that we enter into fraternity and cooperation with all Islamic groups. We seek such fraternal relations with Islamic parties and organizations, Islamist figures, and groups that follow a Salafi tradition or a Sufi or a scientific tradition. In the Komala Islami, we believe that the group must be open-minded and seek fraternity with all those who call or act for Islam. If we see a mistake, we will try to correct it through dialogue and by creating a fraternal atmosphere."

The Kurdistan Justice Group and Kurdistan Islamic Movement were among the first to congratulate the Taliban when they took control of Afghanistan. MPs of the group said that they are "sending them congratulations and prayers".

In terms of its relationship with other Kurdish political groups, the KJG has generally maintained a cooperative approach, but has also been involved in some political disputes and rivalries. The party has often emphasized the importance of unity among the Kurdish people, and has advocated for dialogue and peaceful resolution of conflicts.

=== Anti-LGBTQ rhetoric ===
On February 22, 2021, it was announced that a lawsuit was filed against Rasan by an MP of an Islamist political faction called Kurdistan Justice Group, Omar Gulpi, because the organization advocated for LGBTQ+ rights locally, and according to him, this was a "against the values of the Kurdish culture." Kurdistan Justice Group is linked to an anti-LGBTQ+ and conservative organization called Astane. The organization works on publishing anti-LGBTQ, SRHR, and gender propaganda.

== Election results ==
=== Council of Representatives elections ===
Election	Leader	Votes	%	Seats	+/–	Position	Government
2014	Mohammad Najib Hassan Ali	137,504	1.06%	3 / 329	New	▲16th	Opposition
2018	Ali Bapir	96,876	0.93%	2 / 329	▼1	▼18th	Opposition
2021	Ali Bapir	64,025	0.72%	1 / 329	▼1	▲17th	Opposition
2025	Ali Bapir	49,756	0.44%	1 / 329	0	▼38th	TBA
