= Ali Bapir =

Kurdish Islamic intellectual and politician in Iraqi Kurdistan

Mamosta Ali Bapir
- عه‌لی باپیر
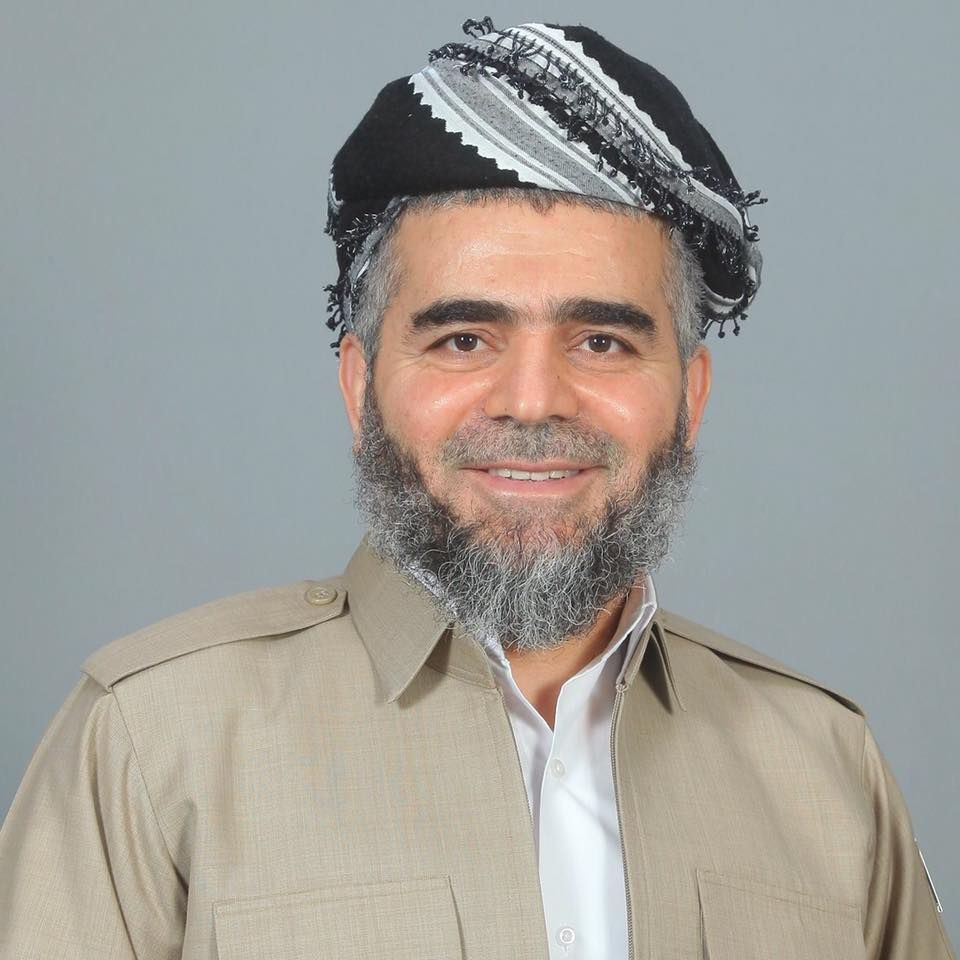
- Ali Bapir - Islamic Kurdish Politician

Founder and Leader of Kurdistan Justice Group
- Incumbent
- Assumed office 2001

Iraq Council of Representatives
- In office 2009–2013

member of political bureau of Kurdistan Islamic Movement
- In office 1991–2001

Personal details
- Born: 1961 (age 64–65) Pshdar District, Sulaymaniyah, Kurdistan Region
- Party: Kurdistan Justice Group
- Children: Sharif Ali Bapir
- Occupation: Political leader
- Profession: Author, Politician, and Islamic Scholar
- Website: http://alibapir.net http://alibapir.com

Ali Bapir, also known as Mamosta Ali Bapir, (Kurdish: عه‌لی باپیر) is a Kurdish Islamic scholar and politician in Iraqi Kurdistan. He is the founder and current president of the Kurdistan Justice Group (formerly known as the Islamic Group of Kurdistan). He was born in 1961 in the Pshdar district, Iraqi Kurdistan. He has written over 150 books on politics, Islam, society, Kurds, and Kurdistan. He is the most popular politician with the Kurdish Islamism ideology.

In the 2009 Iraqi general elections for the Council of Representatives, he was one of the 10 candidates with the most votes in the country.

Bapir fought against Saddam Hussein's regime in the 1980s as a Peshmerga fighter. Bapir also notoriously killed his own brother, who worked with Saddam Hussein's regime to kill an IMK member. After splitting from Islamic Movement of Kurdistan (IMK) in 2000 and establishing the Kurdistan Justice Group, he stayed in the Halabja area adjacent to the Iranian border where extremists had established an Islamic emirate.

When the Americans attacked extremists of the Ansar al-Islam group in March 2003, approximately two dozen soldiers loyal to Bapir were killed as well.

Ali Bapir is one of the first Kurdish politicians from Iraqi Kurdistan to speak against Turkey’s treatment of its Kurdish citizens while on an official visit to Turkey. In 2016, Bapir participated in a discussion panel in Turkey and stated that “Turkey must stop oppressing the Kurds in the North” and that “the issue of the Muslim world is that they have let go of Islam and tradition to play by the rules of the Sykes Picot agreement in 1916 which has divided the nations along illegitimate borders.”

Shortly after the emergence of ISIS, Bapir released a series of books named "Denunciation of Extremism and Refutation of Extremist Ideas" in which he wrote that the teachings of Quran encourage tolerance and coexistence.

When ISIS attacked the Kurdistan in 2015, Ali Bapir released a statement urging the people to defend the region, saying “Defending religious life, people, and land, is a religious obligation, for that reason I urge all of you to be completely prepared and to do whatever it takes to protect the [Kurdistan] region,”

On April 5, 2014, the Garmian Center for Referendum awarded Bapir a medal for his efforts in promoting reform and re-conciliation between the political parties in the Kurdistan Region of Iraq.

A debate with the title “Kurdistan between Democracy and Secularism” was held on April 10, 2016 in Tawar Hall in the Kurdish city of Sulaymaniyah between Ali Bapir and Mala Bakhtiyar, the Chief of the Executive Body of the Patriotic Union of Kurdistan, under the supervision of the Department of Humanities of a French university. The debate was later printed as a book of the same title in 2016. It was translated and published in Arabic and English.

== Literary career ==
In his initial writings Bapir has inspired the poet Khider Kosari.

== Criticism ==
In 2015, after the Islamic State of Iraq and the Levant (ISIL) made advances into the Kurdistan region, Bapir called for the defense of Kurdistan and urged ISIL to not attack. Bapir released the statement that were against these ISIS advances on his personal social media after his polity, the Kurdistan Justice Group, was reluctant to release the same statement and voice their opposition against the terrorist group. Regardless of this public statement, in 2016, Mala Khidir Mustafa Younis, Chairman of the Fatwa Committee of the Union of Islamic Religious Scholars of Kurdistan, said that Ali Bapir had engaged in radicalizing numerous youth to join ISIS and fight against the Peshmerga. He said that ISIS and him ultimately had the same goal.

Ali Bapir and his polity, Kurdistan Justice Group and Kurdistan Islamic Movement were among the first to congratulate the Taliban when they retook control of Afghanistan in August 2021. MPs of the group said that they are "sending them congratulations and prayers".

Ali Bapir and some of the members of Kurdistan Justice Group have refused to stand to the Kurdish national anthem on numerous occasions, which caused fierce debate and criticism against him and the political faction he represents. While defending himself, he said in a statement that "nobody has the right to criticize us for not standing for the anthem, because we cannot respect an anthem which disrespects our religion", referring to part of the anthem which states: "our only religion is our nation." This controversy led to a lawsuit against Ali Bapir's son-in-law, who was also a member of Kurdistan Justice Group.
