= Kurdistan Islamic Movement =

Kurdistan Islamic Movement بزووتنەوەی ئیسلامی لە کوردستان Bizûtineweyî Îslamî le Kurdistan
- Leader: Erfan Ali Abdulaziz
- Founder: Osman Abdulaziz
- Founded: 1987; 39 years ago
- Headquarters: Halabja
- Ideology: Islamism; Social conservatism Kurdish nationalism
- Political position: Right-wing
- Religion: Sunni Islam
- International affiliation: Muslim Brotherhood
- Colours: Black
- Seats in the Kurdistan Parliament: 0 / 111

Party flag

Website
- basknet.net

The Kurdistan Islamic Movement (Note: (Kurdish: بزووتنه‌وی ئيسلامی له‌ كوردستان, romanized: Bizûtineweyî Îslamî le Kurdistan, Tevgera Îslamî ya Kurdistanê in the Kurmanji dialect)) is a Kurdish Islamist party founded in 1987 by mufti Osman Abdulaziz and several other Kurdish Islamic scholars who were part of the non-political "Union of Religious Scholars" group. The party's main support comes from in and around the town of Halabja.

== History ==
In the 1992 Kurdistan Region parliamentary election, the party received 5.1% of the vote, the third largest after the Patriotic Union of Kurdistan (PUK) and Kurdistan Democratic Party (KDP). In 1993, the PUK ceded control of territory around Halabja, Tawella, and Panjwin to the party after heavy fighting, and the party controlled Halabja from 1998 to 2000. In 1998, Osman Abdulaziz moved to Erbil with a number of supporters. After his death in 1999, the leadership of the party passed to his brother, Ali Abdulaziz Halabji, who has his office in Halabja.

There were reported clashes, which resulted in deaths between the PUK, Islamic Groups, Kurdistan Workers' Party (PKK), and the KDP. The heaviest fighting began in September 2001, when a newly created Islamist group, Ansar al-Islam (AAI), seized control of some villages near the Iranian border and created the Islamic Emirate of Kurdistan.

In 1994, KIM carried out a series of bombings in Istanbul, which resulted in the deaths of 20 people and injured more than 120 others. The Turkish government responded by launching a major crackdown on the group, arresting hundreds of its members and supporters. KIM was designated as a terrorist organization by the Turkish government in 2005.

According to press and opposition reporting, the AAI attacked PUK fighters near Halabja, killing dozens of people. Intermittent fighting between the PUK, AAI, and other Islamic groups continued until late November, when the Iranian government imposed a ceasefire agreement between those involved.

As of 2005, the Kurdistan Islamic Movement holds two ministerial posts in the PUK-dominated government. This cooperation appears to be principally a temporary coalition dictated by pragmatic considerations. The Kurdistan Islamic Movement is receiving aid from Iran and is also said to receive money from other Islamic countries. The Kurdistan Islamic Movement has offices in various cities in Northern Iraq, including Sulaymaniyah and Erbil.

During the 2010 Iraqi elections, the party won some 40,000 votes.

A 2015 Saudi cable leak from WikiLeaks revealed that Saudi Arabia donated over half a million dollars to the party.

In late 2025, the party was reported to have moved away from electoral participation to focus on consolidating its territorial control over the rugged Iranian–Iraqi borderlands around Halabja, thus "positioning [itself] for post-state influence should central authority weaken".

== Splits ==
In May 2001, Ali Bapir, a former leader of the Kurdistan Islamic Movement and a former deputy of the Islamic Emirate of Kurdistan left the party with his followers and founded a new party. This party, initially called Kurdistan Islamic Group was later renamed to Kurdistan Justice Group. Bapir's party has since surpassed KIM in terms of political influence.

On 16 March 2024, another faction led by Kamîlî Hacî Elî founded the Kurdistan Islamic Relations Movement, after having left the party following the party's congress in October 2023. On the foundational congress in Silêmanî, where about 1,100 people were present, the new party decided to prepare to participate in the upcoming 2024 Kurdistan Region parliamentary election.

== See also ==
- Ali Bapir
