= Tawella =

Tawella طويلة تەوێڵە تەۋێڵێ
- city
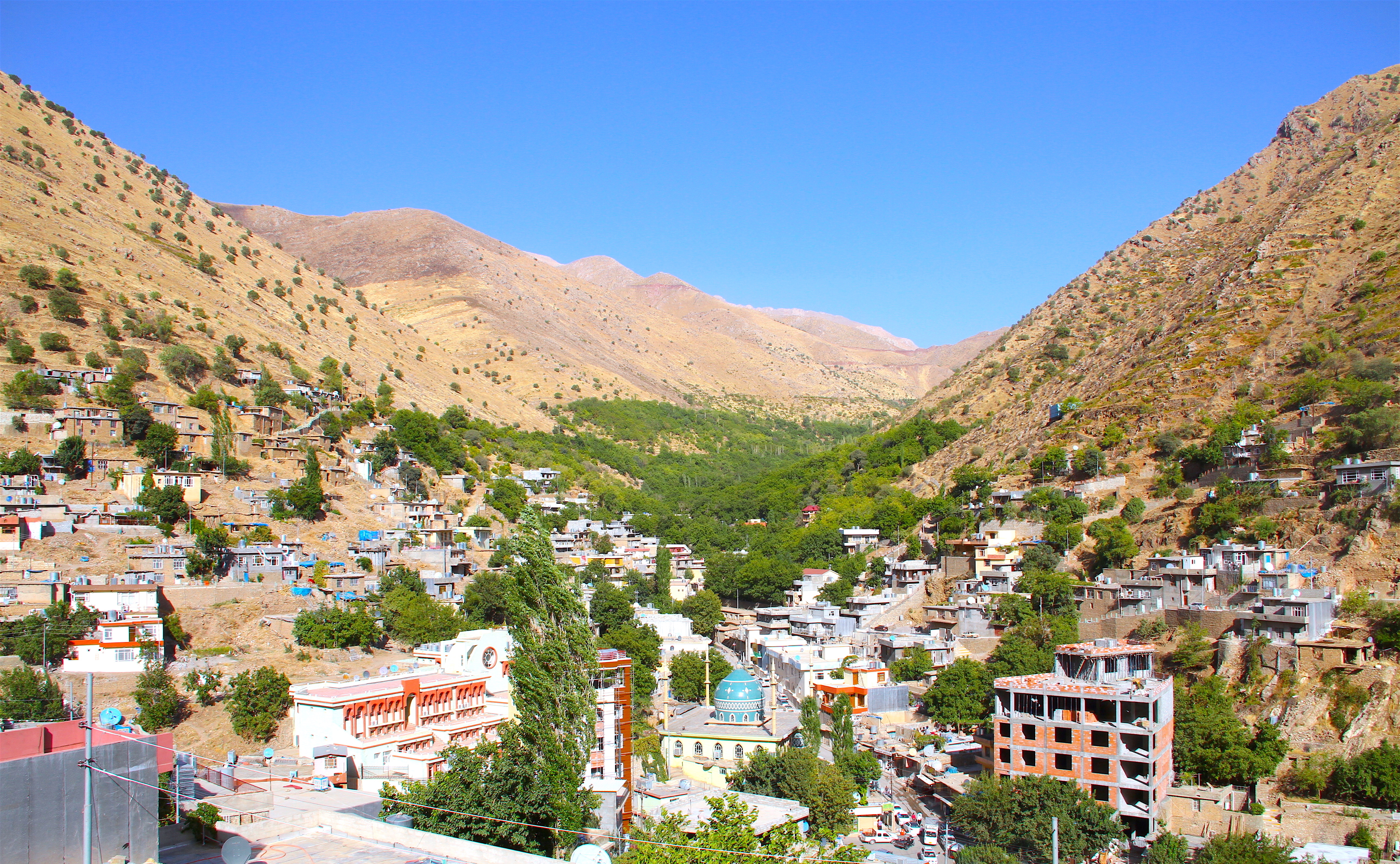

- Location within Iraq
- Coordinates: 35°11′29″N 46°10′52″E
- Country: Iraq
- Governorate: Halabja
- Time zone: UTC+3 (AST)
- Area code: +(964)

Tawella (Arabic: طويلة; Kurdish: تەوێڵە, romanized: Tewêle); is a small town in Halabja Governorate, Kurdistan Region, Iraq, about 34 km east of Halabja. It is the home of the Sheikhs of Tavil.
