= Osman Abdulaziz =

Kurdish Islamic scholar and politician

Personal details
- Born: 1922 Prisi Saroo, Halabja
- Died: May 12, 1999 (aged 76–77) Damascus, Syria
- Resting place: Halabja
- Children: Zubair Abdulaziz
- Parent: Mullah Abdulaziz Halabji (father)
- Occupation: Religious leader, politician, militant leader

Military service
- Allegiance: Kurdish mujahideen
- Branch/service: Kurdistan Islamic Movement
- Rank: Leader

Mullah Osman Abdulaziz (Kurdish: عوسمان عەبدولعەزیز, romanized: Osman Abdulazîz) was a Kurdish Islamic scholar and politician in Iraqi Kurdistan. He created the Kurdistan Islamic Movement. He was famous for declaring jihad against Saddam Hussein's government.

== Life ==
Osman Abdulaziz was born in 1922 in the village of Prisi Saroo close to Halabja to a religious Sunni Kurd family. His father, Abdulaziz, was the Imam of the mosque of Prisi Saroo village. Osman studied the Qur'an, Persian, Arabic, and many other subjects such as grammar and literature. He then went from his village to Trifa village and studied all the basic sciences with Mullah Salih Abdulkarim, a well-known Kurdish Islamic scholar who was his cousin. Osman completed all his religious and linguistic studies when he was 18. In 1935, he succeeded his father in becoming the Imam of the local Mosque. Osman taught at and served Kurdish mosques for more than 50 years. He died on May 12, 1999, in Damascus, Syria, and his body was brought back to Halabja and buried with his wife Atiya and his son Zubair.
