= Timeline of Erbil =

The following is a timeline of the history of the city of Erbil, Kurdistan Region.

== Prior to 20th century ==
- 1232 - The Mudhafaria Minaret was built. The minaret was built by the Turcoman prince Gökböri during the reign of Saladin.
- 1870 - Mustafa Agha became the first Director Municipality of Erbil.
- 1883 - The Sheikh Choli Mosque was built.

== 20th century ==
- 1918 - Erbil was occupied by British forces on November. The British Army captured the city ten days after the Armistice of Mudros was signed.
- 1923 - Ahmed Othman became first Governor of Erbil. He continued being the governor of Erbil until 1927.
- 1930 - Erbil al-Aulla School was established.
- 1943 - The Library of Erbil was established.
- 1966 - 7 September: Erbil Chamber of Commerce was founded.
- 1968
  - Gilkand Park was established.
  - 3 November: Erbil’s main football club, Erbil SC, was formed.
- 1981 - Salahaddin University was relocated to Erbil from Sulaymaniyah.
- 1991 - 11 March: The residents of Erbil attacked Iraqi military bases and stormed government buildings, taking control of the city and inflicting heavy damage on government forces.
- 1992 - Erbil becomes the capital of the Kurdistan Region.
- 1996
  - The Erbil Polytechnic University was founded.
  - 31 August: The city was occupied by forces of the Iraqi Republican Guard.

== 21st century ==
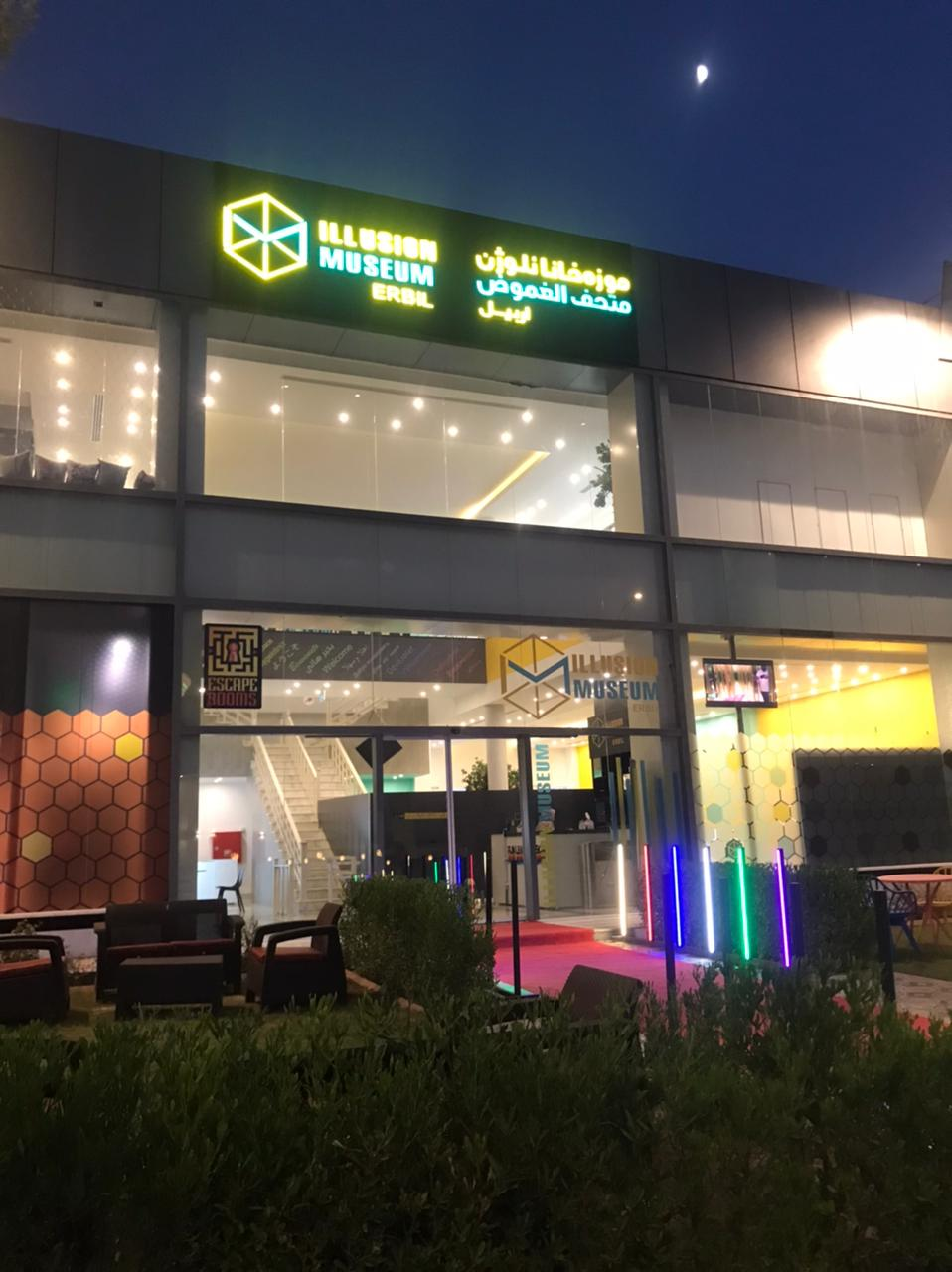
Illusion Museum Erbil

- 2001 - The politician and the governor of Erbil at the time, Franso Hariri, was assassinated by Ansar al-Islam.
- 2004
  - 1 February: The 2004 Erbil bombings occurred, when the governor of Erbil, Akram Mantik, deputy prime minister, Sami Abdul Rahman, and many other people were killed.
  - The Kurdish Textile Museum was established.
- 2005
  - Hawler Medical University was founded.
  - 4 May: The 2005 Erbil bombing occurred, killing many people.
  - 7 July: Erbil International Airport officially opened.
- 2006 - The University of Kurdistan Hewler was established.
- 2007
  - 11 January: The United States conduct a raid on the Iranian Liaison Office in Erbil.
  - 19 January: The Jalil Khayat Mosque was inaugurated.
  - 9 May: A truck bombing kills 19 people and wounds 70 others.
- 2013 - 29 September: The 2013 Erbil bombings had occurred, which killed and wounded many people. The perpetrators are unknown.
- 2014 - 19 November: A bombing occurs near the governor’s office.
- 2015 - 17 April: A car bomb explodes outside the U.S. consulate.
- 2017 - 29 October: Protesters storm the Iraqi Kurdistan parliament after Masoud Barzani announces his resignation.
- 2018
  - 23 July: Unknown gunmen attack the Erbil Governorate building.
  - 4 August: A fire destroys much of the Qaysari Bazaar.
  - 25 October: A fire destroys much of the second-hand shops in the city’s commercial district.
- 2020 - 30 September: Rocket attacks target Erbil International Airport.
- 2021
  - The Erbil Illusion Museum was established
  - 15 February: Multiple rocket attacks strike Erbil. The claimed perpetrator is Saraya Awliya Al-Dam.
  - 24 February: The Armenian Cultural Center opens.
  - 14 April: Erbil International Airport gets attacked by drones.
  - 25 June: A fire destroys Hawler Mall.
  - 6 July: Explosive-laden drones attack the airport of Erbil.
- 2022
  - 28 June: Two university professors are killed in a shooting in the Salahaddin University of Erbil.
- 2024
  - 8 April: A fire destroys second-hand shops in the Langa Bazaar.
  - 5 May: A fire destroys much of the shops of Qaysari Bazaar.
