= Salahaddin University-Erbil shooting =

2022 university shooting in Iraq

2022 Salahaddin University shooting
- Date: June 28, 2022
- Venue: Salahaddin University
- Location: Erbil, Iraq; 36.1435°N 44.0279°E
- Type: Shooting, murder
- Target: University professors
- Perpetrator: Aras Mahdi Qassim
- Deaths: 2
- Injuries: 1

On the morning of June 28, 2022, two university professors in Salahaddin University-Erbil were killed in an armed attack by a former student. In two separate shooting incidents, the suspect killed the dean of Salahadin College of Law, Karwan Ismail, and Engineering College teacher Irdis Ezzat. Erbil Governor Omed Khoshnaw later said that Ismail died of his injuries in the hospital. Idris Izzat was alone in his house when the killer intruded to his home and killed him. The killer was a former student of Soran University. The person had been dismissed earlier.

== Incident ==
A disgruntled former student, Aras Mahdi Qassim, obtained a pistol through Facebook and travelled to the home of a lecturer at Soran University. Armed with the weapon, he chased and killed the lecturer’s husband. Qassim subsequently drove to Salaheddin University, where he opened fire on a university security guard, injuring him, before killing the dean of the Faculty of Law. He was reportedly motivated by resentment over his expulsion from Soran University for poor academic performance and his unsuccessful attempt to transfer to Salaheddin University.

== Aftermath ==
In 2023 a Erbil court sentenced the perpetrator, Aras Mahdi Qassim to death. Brzo Saeed, the lawyer of the victims families added that two death sentences were issued and that “carrying out of the execution awaits the signature of the KurdistanRegion’s president.”
