= 2025 Iraq drone attacks =

2025 attacks in Iraq

2025 Iranian militia attacks in Iraq
- Part of the Iran–Israel proxy conflict and Middle Eastern crisis
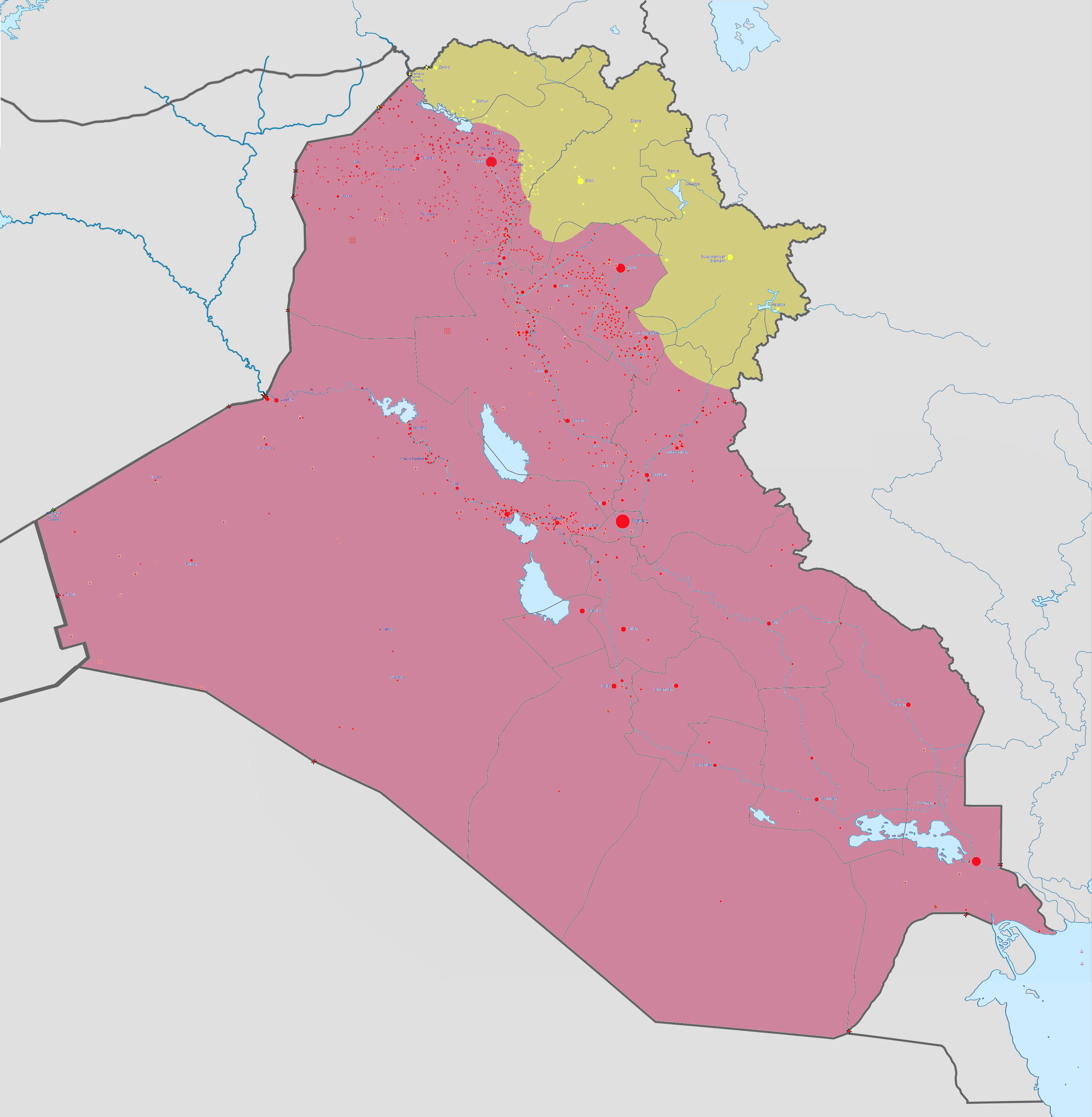
Date	2 February 2025 – December 2025
Location	Iraq
Result	Several oilfields across Kurdistan hit by drones; Several military bases and airports hit by drones

Belligerents
Iraq (Kurdistan Region) Kurdistan; United States	Popular Mobilization Forces; Iran

Casualties and losses
(Kurdistan Region) East Kurdistan Defense Forces: 1 fighter killed, 1 injured	Unknown
- 1 Yazidi child injured

The 2025 Iraq drone attacks were a series of drone attacks throughout Iraq, likely carried out by the Iranian aligned Iraqi militias. The targets of the drone attacks include mostly the Iraqi and foreign military facilities and oil refineries.

== Background ==
The attacks on the oilfields marked significant escalation in regional tensions and imposed substantial threat to Iraqi energy infrastructure. The assaults hit multiple facilities including those operated by international companies and lead to the suspension of production and considerable production losses. No definite group took responsibility of the attacks, however the Kurdistan regional Government accuses the Iranian backed militias in Iraq for the repeated assaults.

== Events ==
=== February ===
On 2 February 2025, a kamikaze drone hit the Khor Mor gasfield in the Kurdistan region amid negotiations between the Kurdistan Government and the Iraqi government on energy issues. The attack also coincided with the rising call in the parliament for the disarmament of Iranian backed militias in Iraq.

=== June ===
On 23 June, Iraqi state media reported drone attacks at Iraq's Taji military base, quoting a military official but claimed no casualties. Iran's Tasnim news agency reported drone hits at the US Victory Base Complex, near the Baghdad International Airport. The Balad military base in Iraq also reportedly came under attack. Iran's Tasnim news agency claimed that two explosions were heard inside the base. The Al Sumaria TV network reported an attack on the radar systems at Imam Ali base in Iraq. According to a spokesman for the Iraqi Prime Minister, the drones caused significant damage to the radar systems of the Taji and Imam Ali bases. The Iraqi government condemned the attacks as a "cowardly and treacherous" assault. On 24 June 2025, the Associated Press reported that the United States intercepted drones that targeted Ain al Asad Airbase and another base near Baghdad Airport on the night of 23 and 24 June with one drone crashing near the site. There were no casualties. A third drone crashed in al Radwaniyah, about seven kilometers from the Baghdad airport. The Iraqi government stated that the drone attacks targeting Camp Taji and Imam Ali Air Base severely damaged Iraqi radars.

On 24 June, the United States forces shot down five drones launched to attack the military bases as well as the Baghdad airport and western Iraq. No casualties were reported.

=== July ===
On 1 July, at 00:30, an explosive laden drone crashed into the Darkar camp, which shelters displaced Yazidis who fled the 2014 Sinjar massacre, located in Zakho. One Yazidi child was injured. The Attack was condemned by the United Nations Assistance Mission for Iraq (UNAMI). Three projectiles struck the Kirkuk airport damaging a gate which was adjacent to the military zone. Two drones fell in the military zone and one in the civilian zone of the airport with two civilians being wounded.

On 3 July, a drone attack targeted the Erbil International Airport hosting American forces. Kurdistan Regional Government's Counter-Terrorism Group reported its interception. The attack was alleged by Kurdish authorities to have been carried out by Popular Mobilization Forces.

Iranian-backed Iraqi militants launched a drone attack targeting the Erbil International Airport, but the drone was intercepted. Two unidentified drones hit the Khurmala oilfield in Erbil Governorate, resulting in damages to a water pipeline.

On 15 July, a drone hit the Sarsang oilfield hours before its operator, the American private company HKM energy, was scheduled to sign a deal to develop another oilfield. HKM stated that the attack halted the production of 30,000 barrels of oil after an explosion at the site.

On 16 July, the Peshkabir and Tawke oilfields in Kurdistan Region, operated by the Norwegian DNO were attacked by three drones, halting oil production. The Ain Sifni oilfield operated by U.S. firm Hunt Oil in Duhok was also hit by two drones, the same day. The Iraqi state-owned Bai Hassan oil field in Kirkuk Province was also targeted. A Kurdish official blamed the Popular Mobilization Forces for the attack.

On 17 July, the Tawke oilfield was hit by another barrage of drones sent to Duhok and Erbil.

On 20 July, Iran carried out a drone strike in Shiwa Gwezan targeting a Toyota Hilux carrying a member of the East Kurdistan Defense Unit, killing him and wounding another person.

On 28 July, four kamikaze drones struck different areas of Iraq; two crashed in the Erbil Province with one near the village of Korgosk and the other a cafe in Rizgari; and one crashed in the Bardarash District of Duhok Province and the other fell near the village of Hihawa in Kirkuk Province.

On 30 July, a bomb-laden drone fell near Makhmur, Iraq, however, according to Kurdish counterterrorism agencies, it did not explode near the Dugirdkan village. Kurdish authorities blamed Iranian backed militias for the attack.

=== August ===
On 22 August, the Islamic Resistance Coordination Committee warned that the Iranian backed militias are on the "trigger of defense" amid pressures from the United States on the Iraqi government for the diminishing Iranian influence in Iraq and demanding the full withdrawal of US from Iraq.

On 27 August, five oilfields in the Kurdistan region were subject to drone attacks. The Counter terrorism Agency in Kurdistan reported that between 6 and 6:15 in the morning, Norwegian owned DNO oilfield in Bishkhabour in Zakho, Duhok Province was struck by two explosive drones. At 7:00, another attack took place in the oilfield at Tawki without any reported casualties. At 7:14, an American company Hand Oil operated in Badrra was struck by an explosive drone without any reported human loses. Earlier on Monday, Kurdish authorities stated an explosive drone was shot down near Erbil International Airport while two drones attacked the Khormala oil field.

=== November ===
On 26 November a drone attack hit the Khor Mor gas field in the Kurdistan region of Iraq by Iranian-Backed militias. Gas flows feeding the regions power grid collapsed, and electricity generation fell by nearly 80 percent. The attack also destroyed Khor Mor's newly completed liquefied gas facility. It also effected electric supplies in Salahaddin, Kirkuk, Ninewa, and even Baghdad.

== Reactions ==
=== Regional ===
- (Kurdistan Region) Iraqi Kurdistan government: The Ministry of Natural Resources strongly condemned the "terrorist attacks to undermine civilian safety in the energy sector" and urged the federal government to take necessary measures.
- Federal government of Iraq: The Iraqi president Abdul Latif Rashid condemned the attacks on the oilfields calling it an attempt to threaten peace and stability in the region.
- The United Nations in Iraq condemned the 1st of July, Yazidi refugee camp attack.

=== International ===
- United States: The Department of State spokesperson, Tammy Bruce strongly condemned the attacks stating that Iraqi government has a duty to protect its territory and its people.
- United Kingdom: The British embassy in Baghdad strongly condemned the strikes and stated that the strikes threaten civilians’ safety, damage Iraq’s economy and undermine Iraq’s stability.

== See also ==
- 2021 Erbil missile attacks
- 2022 Erbil missile attacks
- 2020 Camp Taji attacks
- Axis of Resistance
- Twelve-Day War
