= Sheikh Zana =

Iraqi-Kurdish criminal (1970-2006)

- Born: 1970; Erbil, Ba'athist Iraq
- Died: 21 September 2006 (aged 35–36); Erbil, Iraqi Kurdistan
- Cause of death: Hanging
- Years active: 1990s-2005
- Conviction: Death by hanging

Details
- Victims: Dozens
- Date: Unknown (Several years)
- Locations: Erbil, Duhok
- Date apprehended: 2005

Zana Nasrat Abdul Karim Barzinji (1970-2006), commonly known as Sheikh Zana (Kurdish; شێخ زانا), was the leader of an armed network that operated mostly in Erbil, Iraqi Kurdistan. In 2005 a court found him and 10 other members guilty of dozens of killings, rapes, and kidnappings over a several-year period. He was executed by hanging in Erbil in September 2006. Zana and his group were the first executed by the Kurdistan Regional Government since it was established in 1992.

== Early life ==
Barzinji was born in Erbil in 1970. He studied mechanical engineering at Salahaddin University in Erbil and was married with two children. He came from a family with Sufi roots and settled in the village of Halaja near Erbil, where he established a religious lodge. Before becoming the leader of his own armed group, Barzinji was involved in Kurdish Islamist circles. He joined a jihadist group established in Erbil by Sheikh Amin in the early 1990s and served as its military office chief.

He was also a teacher of religious studies and Arabic at a secondary school in Khalifan and as a taekwondo instructor. Barzinji and Mulla Amin subsequently announced the establishment of an Islamic Jihad movement after disagreements within the Islamic Movement in Kurdistan.

The group associated with Barzinji subsequently developed into an armed network operating in Iraqi Kurdistan. Barzinji established the network before the 2003 invasion of Iraq, it had ties to Ansar al-Islam and Ansar al-Sunna. The network was accused by the Kurdistan Regional Government of involvement in assassinations of officials and the 2004 Erbil bombings.

Islamist figures in the Kurdistan Region disputed describing Sheikh Zana and his network as an Islamist group, saying that some of its members had initially been involved in Islamist activity but later departed from it.

== Confessions ==
According to a Kurdish security official, during their interrogation the group had admitted to beheading people and carrying out bomb attacks in Erbil and Duhok. In July 2005 Kurdish news channels broadcast "confessions" to acts of murder and rape by Sheikh Zana and others. Amnesty international notes they had been taped while they were held in detention. The broadcast was accompanied by graphic footage taped by the men during the crimes. Zana reportedly stated, "We slaughtered a number of citizens after luring them to my house in the center of Erbil. The purpose was to train the group working with me in slaughtering and dismembering citizens, then placing the bodies in bags and dumping them in remote areas." In another suspects confession, Diler Haidar stated, "Sheikh Zana told me, 'We need Islamic intelligence, and to achieve this, we must engage in all sorts of activities, including sodomy, sex with girls, drinking alcohol, gambling, and mingling with all kinds of people.” He added, "Two men refused to have sex, so the sheikh (Zana) ordered us to kill them. We carried out the order and killed them with a silenced pistol. Then we dismembered them and put them in nylon bags to dispose of them in remote areas.” Images published by the New York times included scenes of a blindfolded young man being beheaded and other sexual acts including acts between men. Kurds in Erbil gathered in front of their televisions to watch the broadcast. A statement by the Patriotic Union of Kurdistan said that over 50 women were admitted to the hospital on the night of July 15–16, after “suffering from unstable psychological conditions due to the horror of the scenes broadcast on the Kurdish satellite channel.

== See also ==
- Ansar-al Islam in Kurdistan
- 2004 Erbil bombings
- Kurdistan Region-Islamist conflict
