= Erbil attack =

Erbil attack may refer to:

- 2021 Erbil rocket attacks
- 2022 Erbil missile attacks
- 2024 Erbil attack
