= Firsat Sofi =

Kurdish politician (1978–2020)

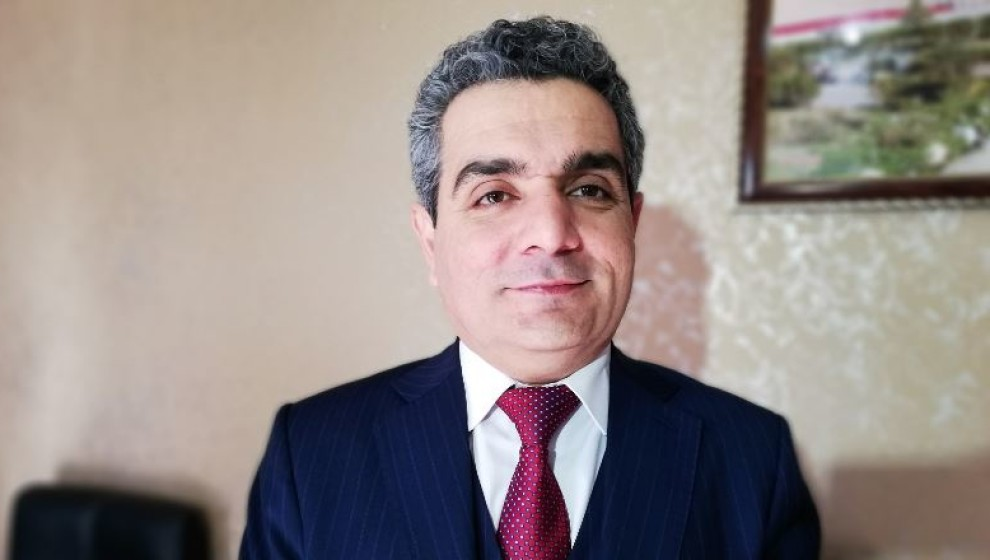

Erbil Governor
- In office 17 September 2019 – 18 November 2020
- President: Nechirvan Barzani
- Prime Minister: Masrur Barzani
- Preceded by: Nawzad Hadi Mawlood

Member of Kurdistan Region Parliament
- In office 2013–2018

Personal details
- Born: Farsat Sofi Ali; 21 May 1978 Gazna, Choman District, Kurdistan Region
- Died: 18 November 2020 (aged 42) Ankara, Turkey
- Party: Kurdistan Democratic Party
- Spouse: Wisal Abdulaziz
- Children: 4
- Education: Salahaddin University-Erbil

Firsat Sofi Ali (Kurdish: فرسەت سۆفی, 21 May 1978 – 18 November 2020) was an Iraqi Kurdish politician of the Kurdistan Democratic Party (KDP).

== Biography ==
He was born in Gazna village in Choman District. Firsat was the Governor of Erbil until he died due to COVID-19 on 18 November 2020.

Sofi held a PhD in International Law from Salahaddin University and taught law at Erbil Polytechnic University. He was also a legal advisor at the Kurdistan Region Presidency’s office.

Sofi contracted Coronavirus on October 19 and was flown to Turkey for medical treatment in Istanbul's Memorial hospital on November 2. Following his death, President Nechirvan Barzani offered condolences to Sofi's family, describing him as "an active parliamentarian and competent legal expert who had a significant role in the Kurdistan Parliament." Barzani added that "His professionalism, integrity, patriotism, and devotion has made Dr. Firsat much loved by the public."

After his death, Omed Khoshnaw became the new governor of Erbil.
