= Karim Zand =

Kurdish historian and geographer (1924–2017)

- Born: 1924; Sulaymaniyah
- Died: 2017 (aged 92–93)
- Education: Teachers' College, Baghdad (1944)
- Occupations: Historian, Geographer
- Known for: Writings on Kurdish history, tribes, and language
- Notable work: Kurdish language and translation technic

Karim Zand (Kurdish: که‌ریم زه‌ند, کەریم زەند, 1924–2017) was a Kurdish historian and geographer known for his writings on Kurdish history, tribes and language. From the 1940s to his death, he wrote more than twenty books and five hundred articles.

== Biography ==
Zand was born in 1924 in Sulaymaniyah and completed primary, secondary and religious school in the neighborhood he was born in. He afterwards moved to Baghdad and graduated from the Teachers' College in 1944 and became a teacher. He started writing in 1940 and had since 1938 been involved in politics including in the Republic of Mahabad. He moreover travelled to the Soviet Union with Kurdish leader Mustafa Barzani.

Beside Kurdish, he spoke Arabic, English, French and Persian.

In 1977, he published the book Kurdish language and translation technic.

== Family ==
He came from a noble Kurdish family who were land barons with roots from the royal Zand dynasty. One of his relatives were Saeed Qazaz. His later relatives are descendants of a princely Kurdish-Iranian family with Qajar roots, called Begzada Chalabi, and of a prominent, famous Kurdish noble family known as the House of Aghal. His second cousin is a Princess of Qajar and Noori Aghal.

== Death ==
Karim Zand died on October 10, 2017, at the age of 93, in his hometown of Sulaymaniyah.
