= 2022 Erbil missile attacks =

Missile attacks on Erbil, Kurdistan Region, Iraq

- Part of Iran–Israel proxy conflict
- Location of Erbil
- Location: Erbil, Kurdistan Region, Iraq
- Date: 13 March 2022, 1:20 a.m. (local time, UTC+3)
- Attack type: Missile attack
- Weapon: Fateh-110
- Deaths: 15 killed (per Kurdish officials); 3 killed (per Iranian media)
- Injuries: 1 civilian (per Kurdish officials); 70 injured (per Iranian media)
- Perpetrator: Iran: Islamic Revolutionary Guard Corps
- Motive: In retaliation to Israeli sabotage operations in Iran

The 2022 Erbil missile attacks occurred on 13 March 2022 when multiple ballistic missiles were launched by the Iran's Islamic Revolutionary Guard Corps from East Azerbaijan province, Iran, against the city of Erbil in Kurdistan Region, Iraq.

12 Fateh-110 ballistic missiles were reportedly launched from Iran. The IRGC said that the target was Israel's "strategic center" in Erbil. Kurdish authorities reported that among the places hit by the missiles were the city's American consulate and a residential neighbourhood. One civilian was confirmed injured by the attack by Kurdish officials. According to one US official, the hit targets buildings where a Mossad cell was suspected of operating, according to a conversation with an Iraqi counterpart.

The next day, the Iranian Islamic Revolutionary Guard Corps claimed responsibility for the attack.

== Background ==
A few days before, the IRGC released a statement promising Israel will pay for the killings of Ehsan Karbalaipour and Morteza Saeidnejad, two IRGC colonels killed in an Israeli airstrike in the outskirts of Damascus in Syria on 7 March. Major General Hossein Salami, IRGC Commander-in-Chief and General Amir Ali Hajizadeh attended their funerals.

== The attack ==
The ballistic missiles struck the target at 1:20 a.m., the same time of the assassination of Major General Qasem Soleimani by a U.S. drone strike in 2020.

== Reactions ==
On Sunday, Iraq summoned the ambassador of Iran to protest the missile attack.

Iraqi Shiite cleric Muqtada al-Sadr responded to the attack by tweeting "The territory of Iraq from south to north, and east to west should not be part of conflicts and that Iraq's "involvement" in conflicts was a dangerous precedent, while calling on the competent authorities to immediately send a protest letter to the United Nations and additionally to summon the Iranian ambassador.

The airstrikes were also denounced by Prime Minister of Iraq Mustafa Al-Kadhimi, the United States Department of State, President of Iraq Barham Salih and former President of Kurdistan Region Masoud Barzani, the latter two of whom described it as a terrorist attack.

Israel's officials declined to comment.

== See also ==
- 2004 Erbil bombings
- 2005 Erbil bombing
- 2013 Erbil bombings
- 2021 Erbil rocket attacks
- Operation Martyr Soleimani
- 2024 Erbil attack
