= Camp Taji =

Human settlement in Iraq

Camp Taji Camp Cooke Al Taji Army Airfield
- Taji, Baghdad Governorate in Iraq
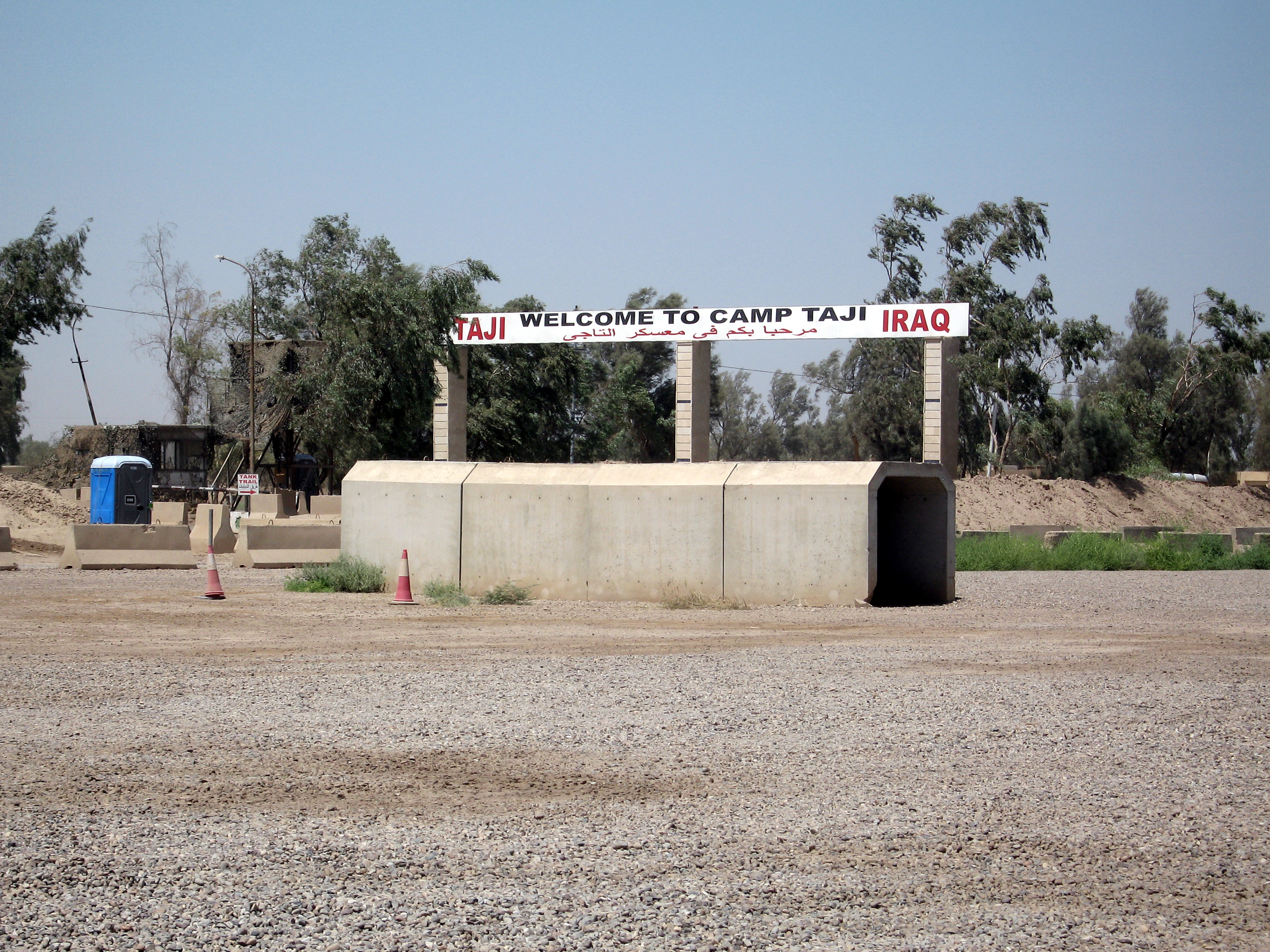

Site information
- Owner: Ministry of Defence
- Operator: Iraqi Army

Location
- Shown within Iraq
- Coordinates: 33°31′46″N 44°16′39″E

Site history
- Built: 2003
- In use: 2003–present

Airfield information
- Identifiers: ICAO: ORTI

Camp Taji (ICAO: ORTI), also known as Camp Cooke, is an Iraqi army military installation near Taji, Baghdad Governorate, Iraq. The camp is located in a rural region approximately 27 km (17 mi) north of the capital Baghdad.

== Saddam era ==
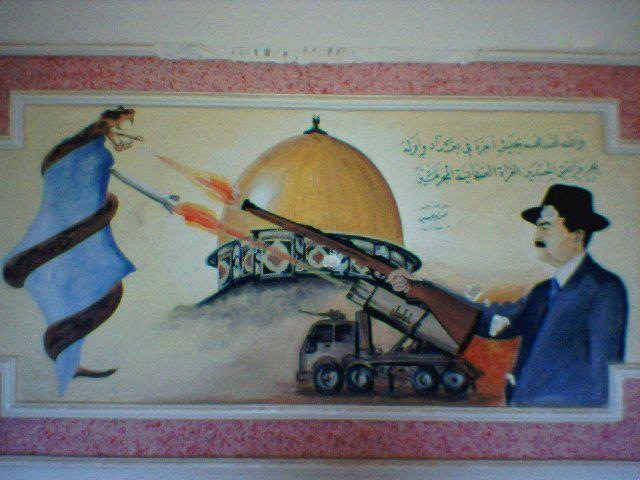
Saddam Hussein art inside an abandoned building at Camp Taji, 2004

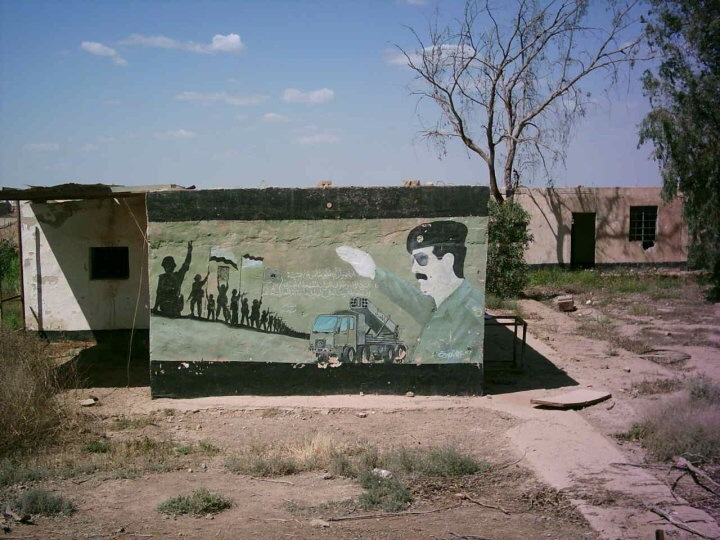
Saddam art on the outside wall of an abandoned building at Camp Taji, 2004

Al-Taji airfield, located in the volatile area nicknamed the Sunni Triangle, was originally an Iraqi Republican Guard base during the Saddam era. It was once a center for the manufacture of chemical weapons. UNSCOM found at Taji 6,000 empty canisters designed to be filled with chemical weapons for use in 122mm rockets.

According to the Gulf War Airpower Survey, there was a Sector Operations Center located at Al Taji. The airbase is served by a 1,700 m (5,600 ft) runway. Taji was also the largest tank maintenance facility in Iraq.

Taji was heavily bombed during Operation Desert Fox in which 13 different targets in the Camp were hit during the December 1998 air strikes.

The base came under American control following the start of the Iraq War.

== American presence ==
=== 2003–2005 ===
In April 2003, Al Taji was an airfield and supply depot for Saddam Hussein's Iraqi Army start of the Iraq War. The 14th Combat Engineer Battalion and 5th Combat Engineer Battalion ("The Fighting Fifth"), attached to the 4th Infantry Division, pushed from Kuwait to Al Taji Iraq and cleared the majority of buildings at Al Taji. It was simply referred to as Taji. The 14th ENGR BN pushed further to Tikrit. 5th Engr left C.CO and HHC on Taji pushing B.co and A Co. farther into Iraq. C.Co 5th Engr cleared and secured buildings and the perimeter of the Al Taji airfield along with a National Guard infantry unit, Co B, 1–179 IN, 45th IBCT, Oklahoma Army National Guard. After Co. C 5th Engineers and a National Guard infantry unit had already cleared the Airfield and supply depot, several weapons and mortar caches were found and taken control of on Taji and the surrounding area.

The camp was captured by the Division Artillery (DIVARTY) of the 4th Infantry Division. The base was then referred to as Forward Operating Base (FOB) Gunner. However, most still simply referred to it as Al Taji or simply Taji . The Base Defense Operations Center and Mayor Cell during this time was operated by the 44th Rear Area Operations Center, Illinois Army National Guard. In early May 2003, Elements of DIVARTY'S 2nd Battalion, 20th Field Artillery and the 1st Battalion, 44th Air Defense Artillery conducted stability and security operations in and around FOB Gunner until March 2004. The 5th Battalion, 3rd Field Artillery Regiment from Fort Sill, Oklahoma, also arrived in early May 2003 to provide security support for the Airfield until they were reassigned to Camp Cedar II (Tallil Air Base) in the late fall of 2003. The 751st Quartermaster Company (Arizona Army Reserve), was located at the camp from May 2003 until April 2004. It established the C.E.M. (Captured Enemy Materials) warehouses, storing weapons, ammunition, vehicles, statues, and anything deemed historically significant. When unit arrived in Iraq, the 3rd Platoon (Warehouse Platoon) of the 751st Quartermaster Company, was tasked with a non-standard warehouse mission to store, receive and issue Captured Enemy Equipment and Weapons (CEE), the unit handled more than 180,000 captured enemy weapons and more than 1.2 million pieces of captured Class II (OCIE/Uniforms) items. Every day, the Soldiers unload Iraqi warehouses filled with thousands of Class II items, relocating the captured items to the CEE warehouse, where they are entered into a computer database designed to make tracking the equipment more efficient. The database also possesses the capability to issue the CEE class II items and weapons in support of Coalition forces responsible for the training of the Iraqi Civil Defense Corps (ICDC), as well as the Iraqi police force. Among the many accomplishments of the 751st are:

Water tower Mural, Camp Taji 2011. Photo by Nathan Mechikoff

- Outfitting more than 46 battalions of ICDC security forces with uniforms, OCIE and weapons.
- Operating 15 warehouses with a staff of only 25 Soldiers
- Unloading more than 24,000 weapons within a 24-hour period

The 751st QMCO 1st platoon also cleaned and maintained an ice facility providing ice to the soldiers of FOB Gunner.

The 878th Engineer Battalion (combat heavy) from the Georgia National Guard provided support to the 1st Cavalry Division and subsequently the 1st Armored Division at Camp Taji from November 2003- May 2004.

The 452nd Quartermaster Army reserve unit from Winthrop, Mn was there providing much needed fuel and supplies for the day-to-day operations of the base. Building the Fuel System Supply Point (F.S.S.P.) to supply the base and surrounding area. They also ran C.E.M. (Captured Enemy Materials) warehouses, storing weapons, ammunition, vehicles, statues, and anything deemed historically significant.

The 430th Quartermaster Company (Puerto Rico Army Reserve) Headquarters were located at the camp providing logistics for other detachments in multiple locations across Iraq. Also, the unit supported the camp reconstruction and security.

In February 2004 the 4th ID DIVARTY relinquished authority over to elements of 3rd Brigade, 1st Armored Division. 3rd BCT had been in the process of redeploying, some of its elements having already moved to Kuwait, when it was informed that it would have to assume control of Camp Taji until units from 1st Cavalry Division arrived in March. 3rd BCT deployed 4th Battalion, 1st Field Artillery, the 70th Engineer Battalion and elements of 1st Battalion 69th Armor Regiment to Camp Taji to fill this six week gap. While under the control of 1st Armored Division, the Camp was renamed Camp Cooke, in honor of the 1st Armored Division Command Sergeant Major who was killed during OIF I. 3rd BCT was relieved at Camp Taji on 24 March 2004 by 1st Battalion, 206th Field Artillery, an element of the 39th Brigade Combat Team, 1st Cavalry Division.

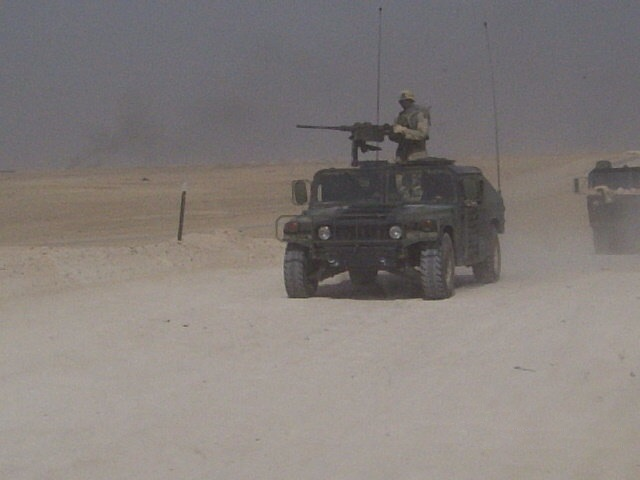
615th ASB 1st CAV Convoy into Iraq for OIF II.

1st Cavalry Division elements stationed at Camp Taji included:

- The 39th Infantry Brigade Combat Team (BCT) from the Arkansas National Guard.
- The 1st Cavalry Division Support Command,
- 4th Brigade (Aviation), 1st Cavalry Division, including the 1st Battalion (Attack), 25th Aviation Regiment from the 25th Infantry Division, and Co. E 3/126 Avn (Air Traffic Control) MAARNG, 615th ASB (Aviation Support Battalion).
- 1st Battalion, 69th Infantry Regiment which was assigned to the 256th Brigade Combat Team, Louisiana National Guard.
- 51 RAOC, South Carolina National Guard which functioned as the Mayor Cell and supported the BDOC
- 27th Main Support Battalion from the 1st Cavalry Division, Fort Hood, Texas
- 980th EN BN from Texas Army Reserves (heavily supplemented with soldiers from 863rd Engr BN (IL) and 983rd Engr BN (OH)
- 452nd QM Co, USAR. Ran and expanded the bulk fuel site, and conducted convoy security as well.

Early in the 1CD rotation (OIF II), an order was issued by MND-B that all Forward Operating Bases would have Arabic names, so Camp Cooke reverted to Camp Taji and the new Dining Facility at Camp Taji was renamed in honor of CSM Cooke.

The 39 BCT controlled the Area of Operations surrounding Camp Taji at this time. The 1st Battalion, 206th Field Artillery of the 39th BCT, along with Battery A, 1st Battalion, 103rd Field Artillery Regiment, Rhode Island National Guard were the main base defense force in 2004, whose missions included gate security, QRF, as well as convoy escort and the inherent Field artillery mission. The 1–206th FA and A/1-103rd FA supplied a Military Assistance Training Team to train, live with and fight alongside the 307th Iraqi National Guard Battalion.

The 593rd Corps Support Group was also headquartered at Camp Taji at this time.

The basic units stationed at Camp Taji remained the same:

- At least one, and up to three Brigade Combat Teams;
- The Combat Aviation Brigade Supporting Multi-National Division - Baghdad (MND-B); and,
- The Sustainment Command supporting MND-B

The 39th Brigade Combat Team was relieved by 3rd Brigade, 1st Armored Division in March 2005. This was the same brigade that had been relieved by 1–206th FA in March 2004. 3rd BCT, 1AD deployed in 2005 as an element of 3rd Infantry Division which was assigned as the Multi National Division – Baghdad headquarters for OIF III. The 1–118th Field Artillery Battalion, of the 48th IBCT, Georgia Army National Guard was attached to 3rd BCT, 1AD during this time. The 4-1 FA relieved 1–206th FA of the Base Defense and Field Artillery Support missions at this time. 51 RAOC was relieved of Mayor Cell responsibilities by 1st Battalion, 151 Field Artillery Regiment, Minnesota National Guard. The 1/117 FA Alabama National Guard Oct 2005 – Oct 2006. 6–32 FA BN From Fort Sill, Ok Deployed Nov 05-06 as C Co. 6–32 FA BN (HET) there they handled the M1070 and the M1000 systems. As part of the 189th CSB. Upon re-deployment the 6–32 FA BN was re-designated the 6–32 FAR and was deactivated at Fort Sill, OK.

4th Infantry Division elements stationed at Camp Taji included:

- 4th Sustainment Brigade.
- 4th Combat Aviation Brigade.
- 428th Qm Company.
- Crusader Battery 1–377 FAR, deployed from Fort Campbell Kentucky, attached to the 4th Sustainment Brigade.
- Various other units.

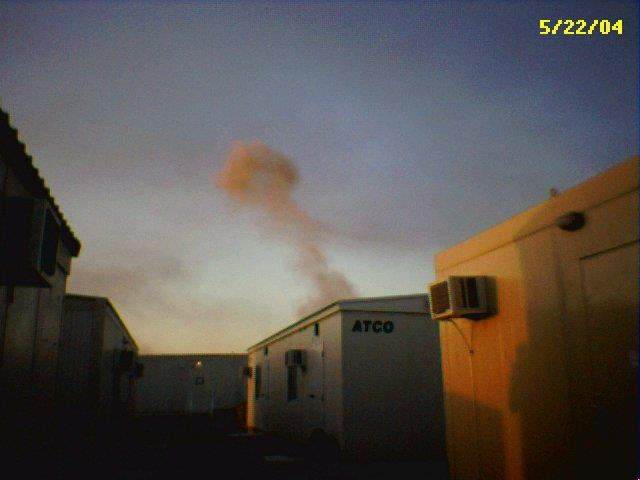
One of many mortar attacks on Camp Taji on May 22, 2004

On April 24, 2004, Camp Taji came under rocket attack, resulting in 4 killed in action, all members of the 39th Support Battalion, an element of the 39th Brigade Combat Team. April 24 was the highest single day casualty total for Arkansas soldiers since the Korean War.

On June 6, 2004, Castle Gate at Camp Taji, fell victim to two VBIEDs. The explosions were one after another, causing approximately 40 casualties.

=== 2006–2008 ===
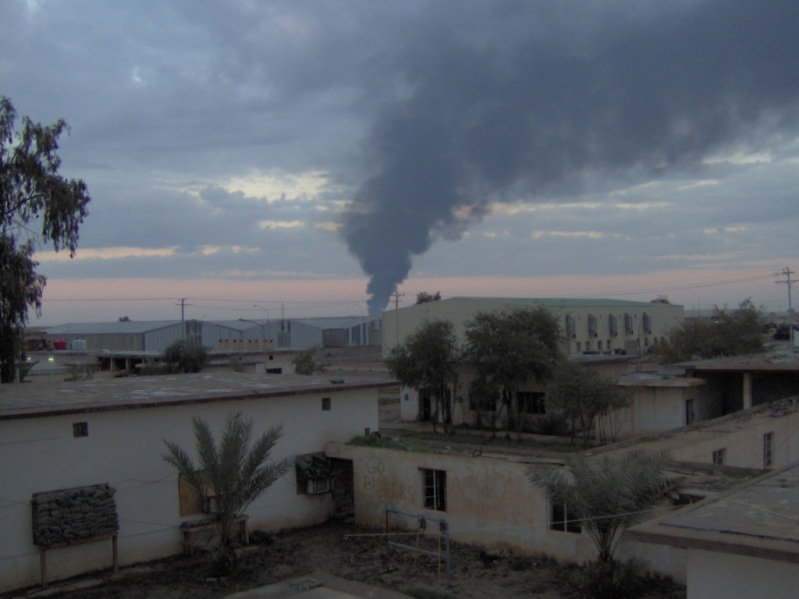
The burn pit located in the north side Camp Taji on 13 February 2006

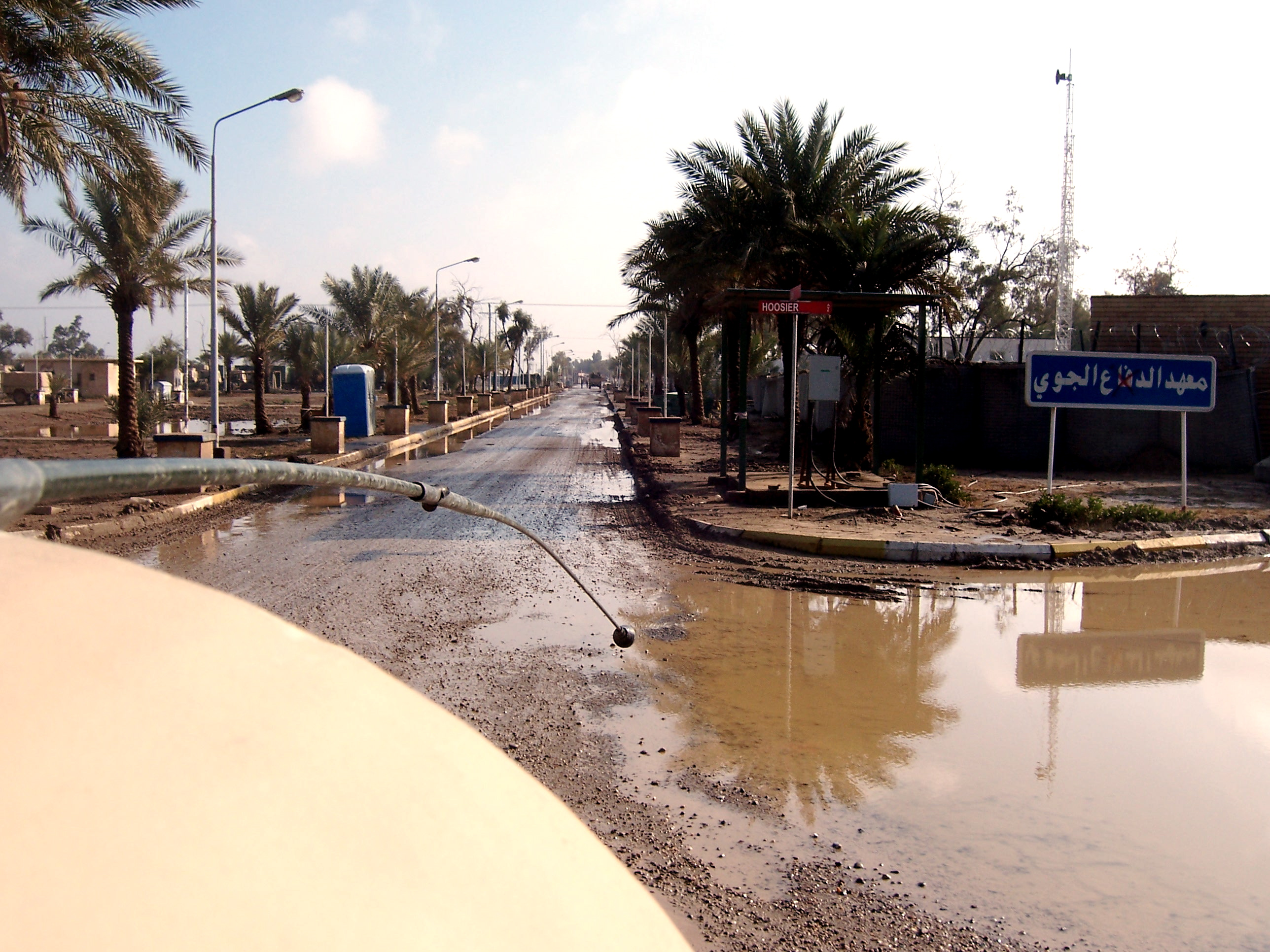
A street corner in Camp Taji, May 2006

3rd Brigade, 1st Armor Division was relieved by elements of the 4th Infantry Division in 2006. 1st Battalion, 327 Field Artillery served as the Mayor Cell during this period.

In November 2006, the 4th Infantry Division was relieved, and 1st Cavalry Division was once again in control of the base. The Mayor Cell was supplied at this time by 786th Quarter Master Battalion from the Virgin Islands National Guard. The Base Defense Operations Center was operated by members of 1st Battalion, 82nd Field Artillery, 1st Cavalry Division.

From September 2006 to September 2007, the 115th Field Artillery, Tennessee Army National Guard operated from Bldg. 55 providing gun truck security to supply convoys throughout the region.

Also in 2007, The 756th Transportation Company (Petroleum, Oils, and Lubricants), while stationed at Camp Taji, Iraq, in support of Operation Iraqi Freedom 05–07, successfully delivered millions of gallons of class IIIB (bulk petroleum) and transported fuel over 200,000 miles throughout the Multinational Division-Baghdad sector. This was possible because of the skills the 756th developed in theater that allowed the unit to transform organically to react to opposing forces. Included in the delivery of Petroleum the soldiers of the 756th aided in Security of the FOB (Forward Operating Base on tower patrol as well as dining facility security.

On August 15, 2007, nine rockets hit Camp Taji, including one at the PX immediately next to the Pizza Hut booth. Two US Soldiers and two non-Iraqi civilians were killed and five US soldiers and five Iraqi civilians were wounded. One US contractor was hit by shrapnel but not injured.

April 2007 saw the arrival of ten Bell OH-58 Kiowa helicopters at Camp TAji to strengthen Iraqi Air Force helicopter training.

In December 2007, the 1st Cavalry Division relinquished control and Camp Taji was occupied by multiple brigade sized elements from a variety of units, until they were relieved by the 4th Infantry Division. The 621st Troop Support Command, Arkansas National Guard acted as the Garrison Command Cell (formerly known as the Mayor Cell) from October 2007 through March 2008 when it was relieved by 1–206th FA. Force protection duties were performed by a number of units, including elements of the California Army National Guard's 1–143rd FA.

July 2007 also saw the arrival of 125 U.S. Air Force personnel to support the Coalition Air Force Transition Team (CAFTT) that took a number of Iraqi warrant officers and trained them in every aspect of Air Combat Power to include training them how to troubleshoot, isolate and repair Huey gunship engines, fuel systems, and every thing associated with daily operations of a squadron of UH HUEY-1 gunships. During this time frame, elements of the 104th Training Division of the U.S. Army Reserve were stationed at Taji as part of the Coalition Military Assistance Training Team (CMATT), providing military training advisors to the Iraqi Army Services and Support Institute (IASSI).

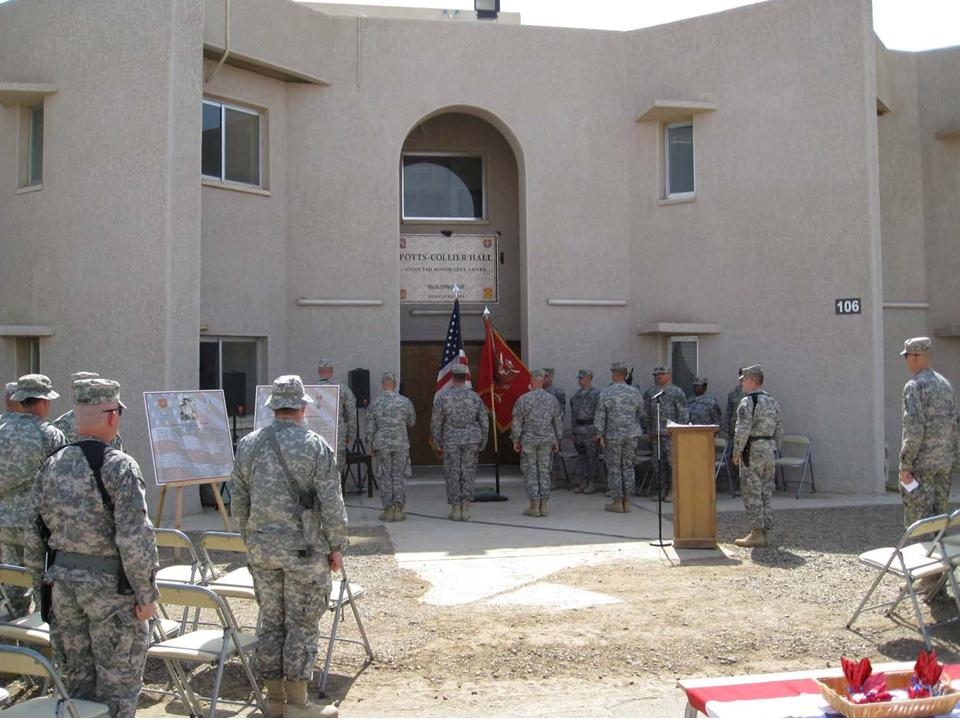
A new Mayor Cell Annex Building is dedicated in the memory of SSG Christopher Potts and SGT Russell "Doc" Collier, May 2008.

In March 2008, 1st Battalion, 206th Field Artillery returned to Camp Taji, this time as the Garrison Command Cell (formerly known as the Mayor Cell). At this time the Base Defense Operations Center was operated by 2nd Battalion, 11th Field Artillery Regiment, a part of the 25th Infantry Division, which was assigned to 4th Infantry Division for the deployment. The 2–11 FA was responsible for securing a security contract to provide over 900 private contractor security guard to provide gate and tower guards for Camp Taji, relieving two Arkansas National Guard companies (1038th HCC and 1123rd TC) of these responsibilities and decreasing the need to mobilize units for these duties in the future. 1–206th FA was relieved by the 949th Brigade Support Battalion, Texas National Guard, in December 2008. 2–11 FA was relieved of the BDOC mission by 1st Battalion, 108th Field Artillery Regiment of the Pennsylvania Army National Guard in January 2009. January 2009, 56th Stryker Brigade Combat Team of the PA Army National Guard arrived. 1st Battalion, 111th Infantry (Stryker) and its associated elements provided combat patrols and area security in the region. The Indiana Army National Guard was also relieved of duty in 2009.

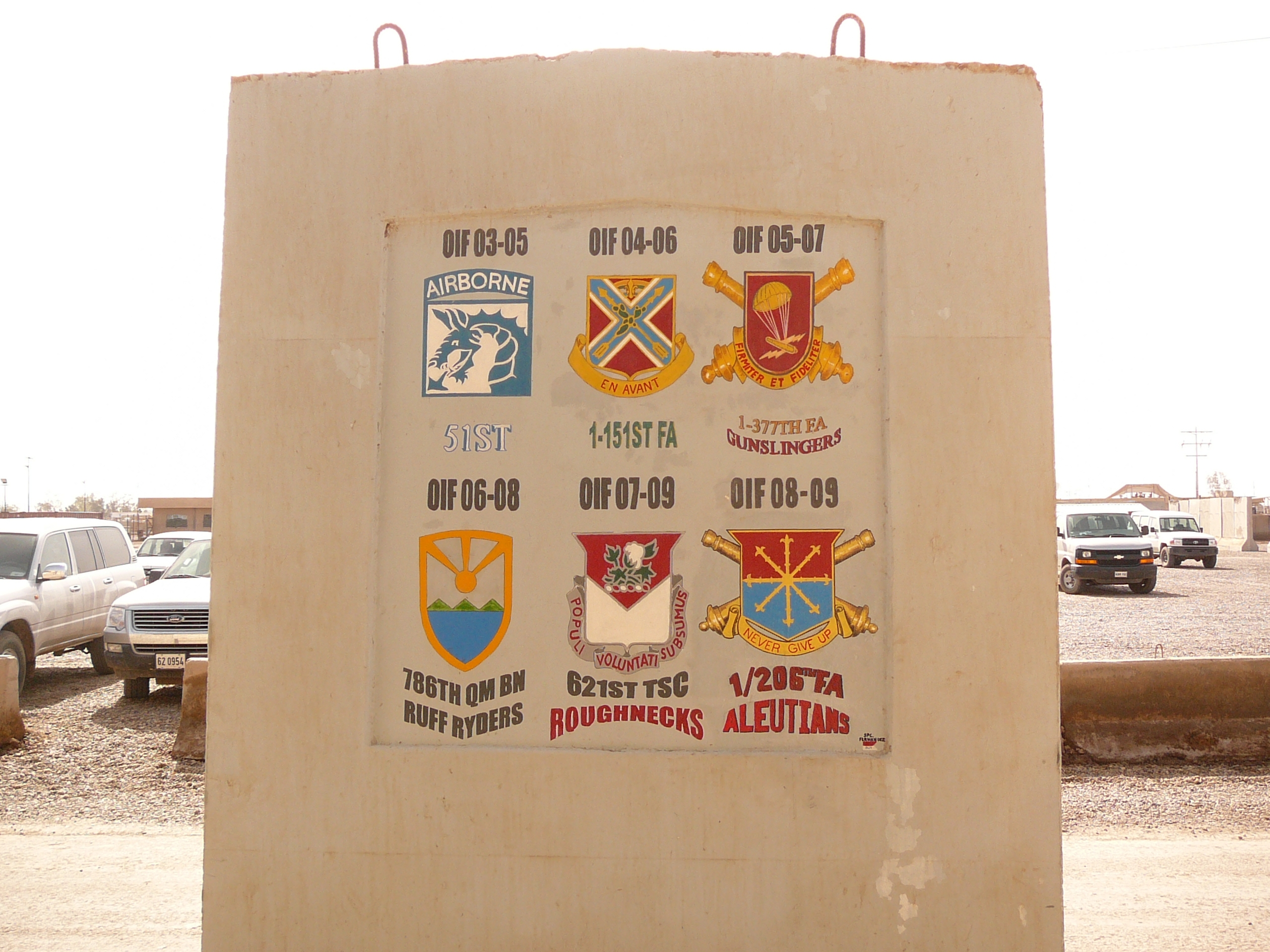
A barrier at the entrance to the Taji Mayor Cell displays the distinctive unit insignia for each Mayor Cell from 2004 to 2009.

=== 2009–2011 ===
In April 2009, the 4th Infantry Division was relieved by the 1st Cavalry Division. At approximately 10 p.m. on April 12, 2009 (Easter Sunday), 2–3 mortars were fired at Taji. All exploded midair near the PX. No casualties were reported.

The 155th Heavy Brigade Combat Team (HBCT), Mississippi National Guard, assumed the dual role of Garrison Command and Base Defense Operations Center in July 2009, relieving both the 949 BSB and the 1–108th FA. As of March 6, 2010 the 278th Armored Cavalry Regiment (Tennessee Army National Guard) officially took charge of Camp Taji Garrison Command, relieving the 155th. The garrison commander was COL Jeffrey H. Holmes. The 278th also assumed a dual role of Garrison Command and Base Defense Operations Center (BDOC). During the tenure of the 278th, many changes took place as the 278th had the initial

Camp Taji Flight Line Mortar attack, Camp Taji 2011. Photo by Nathan Mechikoff

role of downsizing Camp Taji. On May 1, 2010, The 278th Garrison Command took over the role of Law and Order and Military Police functions left vacant by the 26th Military Police Detachment. On July 20, 2010, the 256th Infantry Brigade Combat Team (Louisiana National Guard), the "Tiger Brigade," officially took charge of the Camp Taji Garrison Command and BDOC with LTC Eric Rivers as the garrison commander. The downsizing continued and the far north section of Camp Taji was turned over to the Iraqi Government in December 2010.

May 4th, 2011 Mortar attack patch

CHU Zone, 40th CAB at Camp Taji 2011. Photo by Nathan Mechikoff

Multinational Force – Iraq (MNF–I), often referred to as the coalition forces, was the military command during much of the Iraq War, led by the United States of America. Multinational Force – Iraq replaced the previous force, Combined Joint Task Force 7, on 15 May 2004, and was later itself reorganized into its successor, United States Forces – Iraq, on 1 January 2010.

CHU Zone 33, Camp Taji 2011. Photo by Nathan Mechikoff

In March 2010, a detention center at Camp Taji, which opened in 2008, was transferred to Iraq with 2,900 detained ex-insurgents.

On November 25, 2010 (Thanksgiving Day), Taji came under a rocket attack, injuring two U.S. soldiers. The attack struck the CHU living area.

Three days after the killing of Osama bin Laden (May 1, 2011), on May 4, 2011 at around 05:00, a barrage of 120 rockets, mortars and artillery rounds fell on the camp. The rounds landed within the confines of the FOB during a highly orchestrated insurgent attack. Three soldiers were wounded by shrapnel. It was later determined that the attack had been carried out by the Promised Day Brigade. There are multiple videos on YouTube showing both the view from a U.S. Service Member on the flightline, and the view from the Promised Day Brigade. This was a one of the first times during the war, that the public was able to watch video of an engagement from both sides of the conflict.

By May 2011, all non-U.S. coalition members had withdrawn from Iraq, with the U.S. military withdrawing from the country on December 18, 2011. The camp continues to be the site of the Iraq Taji National Depot.

Flightline, Camp Taji 2011. Photo by Nathan Mechikoff

Flight line of Camp Taji 2011. Photo by Nathan Mechikoff

== Joint base ==
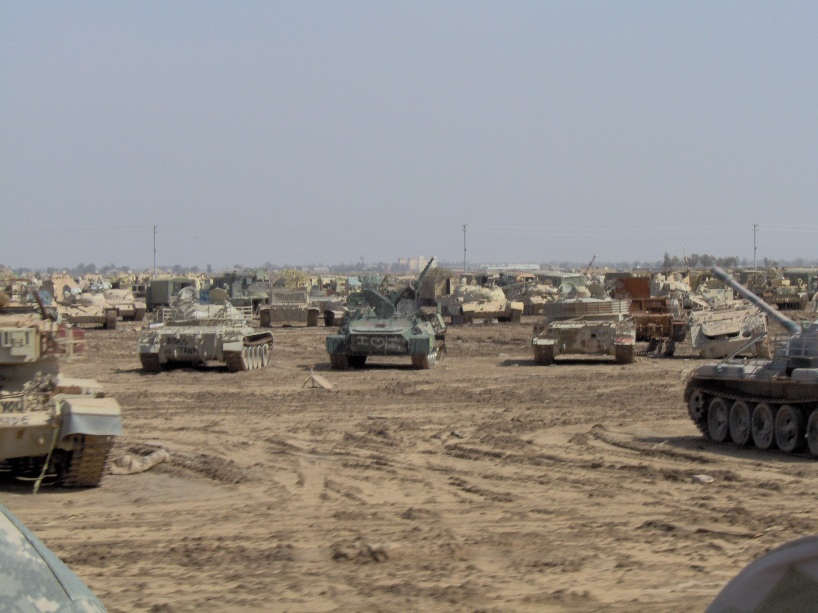
Some of the hundreds of disabled Iraqi armored vehicles in Camp Taji (date unknown)

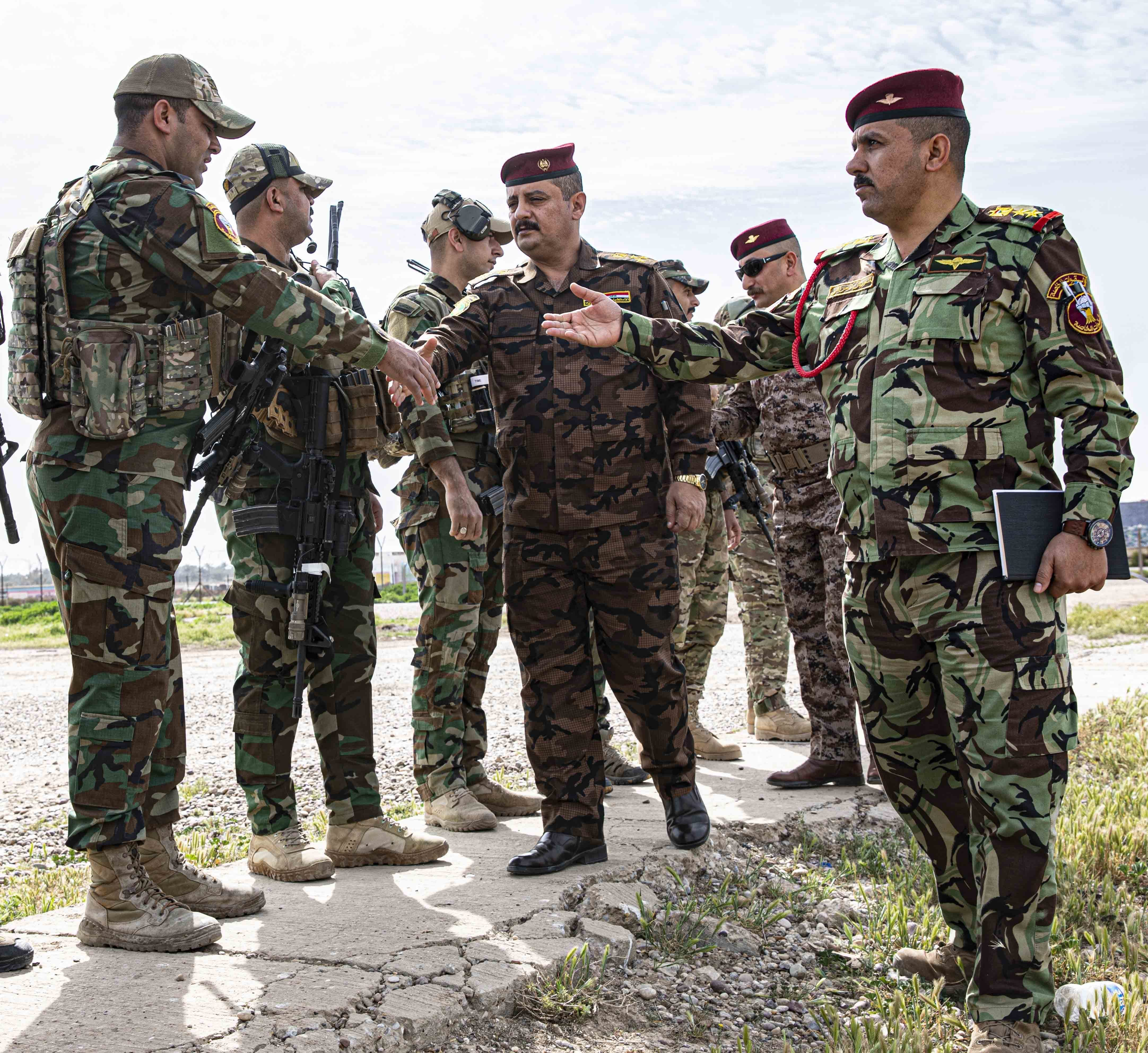
Iraqi Special Operations Forces greet officers during training at Camp Taji, March 2020

Camp Taji is now known as one of many United States camps that also house members of the new Iraqi Army and the Iraqi National Guard. It is also being used to train the newly established Iraqi Air Force. Camp Taji is broken up between two Camps that are joined by a joint Iraqi/US gate. The Iraqi side, called Camp Bennet, is where the Iraqi troops, as well as the Transition Teams live. There is great controversy over the fact that the camp is divided, between "US and them". Much has been written on the subject, but with a simple look at the two camps one can see that there is a great difference in the quality of life on the two sides of the camp.

The base is used by the Military intervention against ISIL under Task Force Taji (TFT) and is home to multiple units which train Iraqi military personnel.

Units include:

- Taji Military Complex Guarding and Protection Battalion.

Since April 2015, the Australian Army has maintained a several hundred strong training team at the base, designated Task Group Taji. The New Zealand Defence Force also contributes personnel to the task group. The first rotation was commanded by Colonel Matt Galton. By the end of June 2018, seven rotations had trained more than 34,000 Iraqi soldiers.

The commanders have been:

- TGT 1 –
- TGT 2 –
- TGT 3 – Colonel Andrew Lowe, Australia until December 8, 2016.
  - Training Task Unit – Lieutenant Colonel David McCammon, DSM.
- TGT 4 – Colonel Richard Vagg, Australia from December 8, 2016.

In March 2020, rocket attacks targeted Camp Taji which killed two Americans and one British soldier.

The base was handed over to Iraqi security forces on August 23, 2020.

In 2025, Iran attacked US bases in Qatar and Iraq.

40th Combat Aviation Brigade Blackhawk, Camp Taji 2011. Photo by Nathan Mechikoff

== Facilities ==
In December 2004 and until October 2010, Camp Taji reportedly boasted the largest PX facilities in Iraq, with Subway, Burger King and Pizza Hut franchises. Until October 2010, the food court also included Taco Bell, Popeyes Chicken, and Seattle's Best/Cinnabon. These concessions are now gone. Although large, the PX facility was poorly stocked in comparison to Baghdad and Balad due to supply issues. In late May 2011, the Green Beans Coffee Shop reopened. Of some 106 bases used by the United States in Iraq in 2007, Camp Taji was considered one of 14 "enduring" bases.

== Civilian contractors ==
Camp Taji was served at any one time by up to 2500 civilian defense contractors in addition to its military personnel. The basic life support contract (food, laundry, water) was supplied by KBR.

The maintenance and base support contract (roads and grounds, building maintenance, construction services) was held by RMS, a wholly owned subsidiary of IAP Worldwide Services, Inc.

A significant service was provided by over 430 Iraqi translators who were working with companies such as TITAN, L3 and GLS. A large number of local interpreters were killed in action, as well as murdered during the Iraqi insurgency.

Beginning in 2013, the basic life support services contract was held by SOS International LLC providing services to foreign military sales customers, who in turn support Iraq Army equipment and training as well as US Military and Coalition Forces.

== See also ==
- List of United States military installations in Iraq
- 2025 Iranian-backed militia attacks in Iraq
