= List of governors of Erbil =

A map of the Erbil province

This is a list of the governors of Erbil.

== Governors between 1923–1958 (Iraqi Monarchy) ==
Person	Took office	Left office
Ahmed Osman	1923	1927
Abdulmajid Alyequbi	1927	1930
Abdulhamid Serser	1930	1932
Jalal Baban	1932	1932
Mehmud Fakhri	1932	1935
Ahmed Tawfiq	1935	1939
Salih Zeki	1939	1941
Mustafa Alyequbi	1941	1943
Mustafa Qaredaxi	1943	1944
Wafiq Hebib	1944	1944
Saeed Qazaz	1944	1947
Jamal Omar Nazemi	1947	1947
Hassan Talebani	1948	1948
Mustafa Qaredaxi	1948	1950
Najemedin Saeb	1950	1952
Rashid Najeb	1952	1953
Ismael Heqi	1953	1956
Abdulhelim Elsenewi	1956	1956
Khalid Alneqshbendi	1956	1958

== Governors between 1958-1992 (Pre-Kurdistan Autonomy) ==
Person	Took office	Left office
Alaeddin Mahmmud	1958	1962
Badreddin Ali	1962	1964
Younis Hussain	1964	1964
Abed Almunem Almassraf	1964	1968
Muhamed Amin Faraj	1968	1970
Khalid Abdulhelim	1970	1970
Abdulwahab Atroshi	1970	1974
Serwan Jaff	1974	1974
Jalal Khoshnaw	1974	1975
Muhammed Ali Amin	1975	1977
Ismael Rasul Ahmed	1977	1978
Baheaddin Ahmed	1978	1980
Yahya Jaff	1980	1984
Ibrahim Zangena	1985	1988
Yahya Jaff	1988	1990
Munzir Mizefer Alneqshbendi	1991	2 September 1992

== Governors between 1992-present (Kurdistan Region) ==
Person	Took office	Left office	Time in office
Abdulmiheimin Barzani	2 September 1992	3 August 1994	1 year, 335 days
Khurshid Sherpa	3 August 1994	October 1 1996	2 years, 59 days
Franso Hariri (Note: Franso Hariri's term as governor ended prematurely due to his assassination on February 18, 2001 by the Ansar Al-Islam group. He was shot while walking to work in Erbil.)	October 1 1996	February 18 2001	4 years, 140 days
Akram Mantik (Note: Akram Muntik died in office on February 1, 2004, when twin suicide bombings targeted the KDP and PUK party offices in Erbil during Eid al-Adha celebrations. He was among more than 100 people killed in the attacks.)	February 18 2001	February 1 2004	2 years, 348 days
Nawzad Hadi (Note: Nawzad Hadi served as Governor of Erbil from 2004 to 2019, a total of 15 years, making him the longest-serving governor in the history of Erbil.)	February 1 2004	September 10 2019	15 years, 221 days
Firsat Sofi (Note: Firsat Sofi died in office on 18 November 2020 due to complications from COVID-19.)	September 10, 2019	November 18, 2020	1 year, 69 days
Omed Khoshnaw	November 18 2020	Incumbent	5 years, 144 days

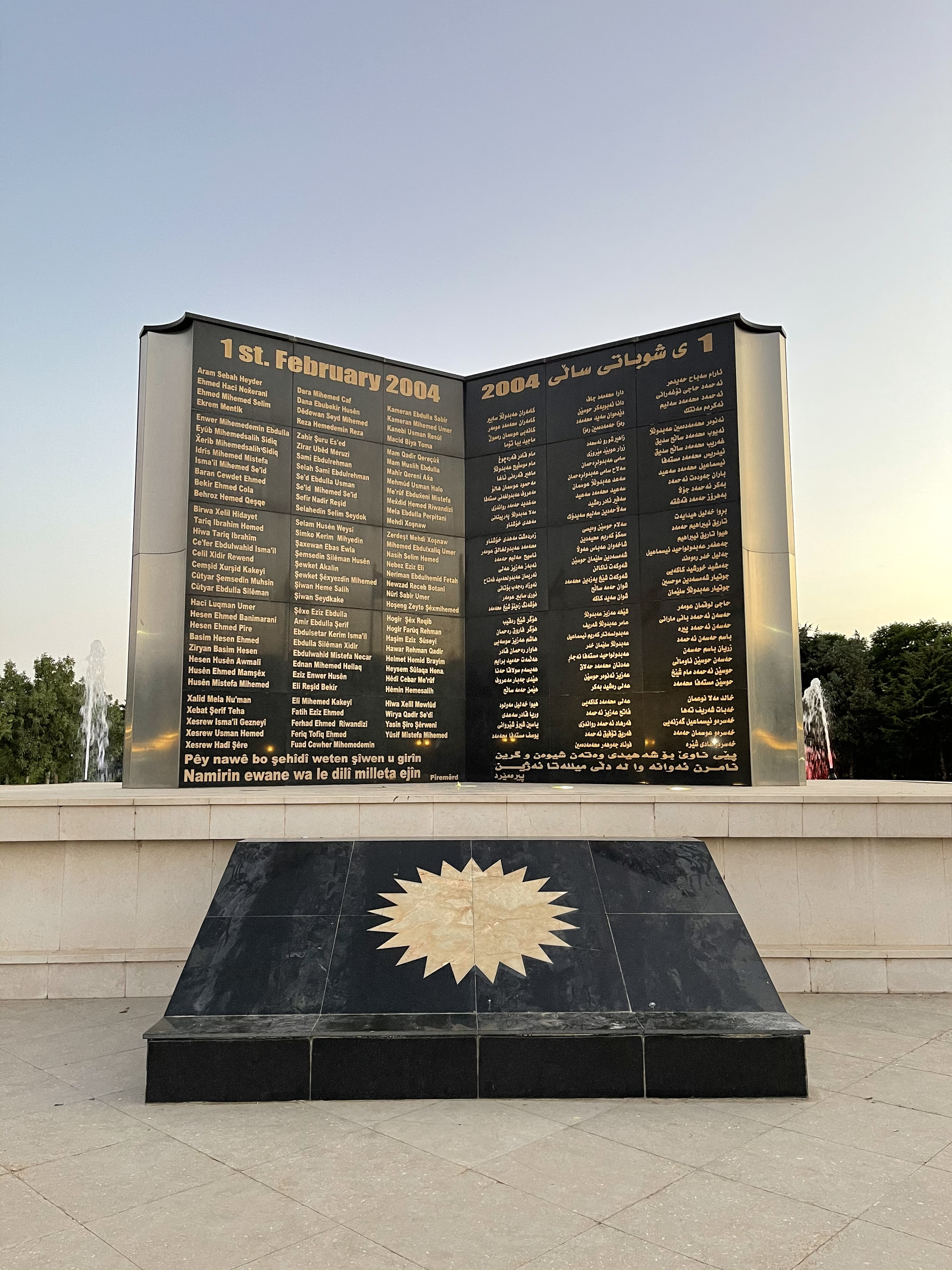
The memorial of the 2004 Erbil bombings at Sami Abdulrahman Park. Akram Mantik, the governor of Erbil at the time, was among one of them.
