= Omed Khoshnaw =

Kurdish Politician and current governor of Erbil Governorate

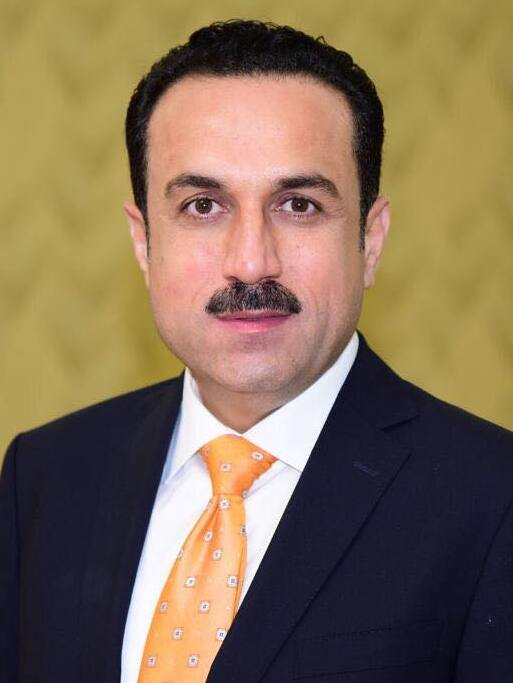
- Omed Khoshnaw

Erbil Governor
- Incumbent
- Assumed office 18 February 2021
- President: Nechirvan Barzani
- Prime Minister: Masrur Barzani
- Preceded by: Firsat Sofi

Member of Kurdistan Region Parliament
- In office 2013–2021

Personal details
- Born: Omed Abdulrahman Hassan; 1 June 1977 (age 49) Erbil, Kurdistan
- Party: Kurdistan Democratic Party
- Education: Salahaddin University-Erbil

Omed Abdulrahman Hassan known as Omed Khoshnaw (Kurdish: ئومێد خۆشناو, romanized: Umêd Xoshnaw, born 1 June 1977) is an Iraqi Kurdish politician of the Kurdistan Democratic Party (KDP). Khoshnaw is the current Erbil governor. He succeeded former governor Firsat Sofi, who died on 18 November 2020 due to COVID-19. From 2013 to 2021, Omed was a member of parliament and head of the KDP block in the Kurdistan Region Parliament.

Omed Khoshnaw is the Governor of Erbil. Omed has a bachelor's degree in Media and Communications, he also finished a master's degree in Public Law.
