= 2021 Erbil rocket attacks =

Missile attacks on Erbil, Kurdistan Region, Iraq

- Part of 2019–2021 Persian Gulf crisis
- Location of Erbil
- Location: Erbil, Kurdistan Region, Iraq
- Date: 15 February 2021, 9:30 p.m. (local time, UTC+3)
- Target: Combined Joint Task Force – Operation Inherent Resolve
- Attack type: Rocket attack
- Deaths: 1 U.S.-led coalition contractor dead 1 Kurdish civilian dead Total: 2
- Injuries: 5 contractors, 1 US soldier and 2 Kurdish civilians Total: 8
- Perpetrator: Saraya Awliya al-Dam (claimed)
- Motive: Opposition to the Combined Joint Task Force (CJTF)

The 2021 Erbil rocket attacks occurred when multiple rockets were launched against Erbil, the capital of the Kurdistan Region, Iraq. On 15 February, approximately fourteen rockets were fired from an area south of the city at around 21:30 local time. Three of the rockets directly hit the U.S.-led coalition base near Erbil International Airport. Two people were killed in the attack, and an additional 13 were injured, including an American service member.

The identity of the attackers was initially unclear, with Iraqi and American authorities launching an investigation to identify the perpetrators. A little-known Shiite armed group called Saraya Awliya al-Dam then claimed responsibility for the attack. Despite this, several Iraqi and Iraqi Kurdish officials and Western analysts blamed Iran and Iranian-backed militias for being behind the attack. Tensions between the U.S. and Iran had been high since the assassination of Qasem Soleimani, a high-ranking Iranian commander of the Quds Force, in January 2020. Iranian authorities denied and condemned the claims of its involvement in the attacks.

The attack was the worst and deadliest in a year on the U.S.-led military coalition in Iraq, and was the first time since late 2020 that Western military or diplomatic installations were targeted in the country. It was the most serious attack on the U.S.-led coalition since the Biden administration took power in January 2021 and sparked fears of escalation. Following the attack, the North Atlantic Treaty Organization (NATO) announced that it would increase the size of its forces in Iraq from 500 to around 4,000 personnel. Another attack was carried out on the airport in April 2021.

== Background ==
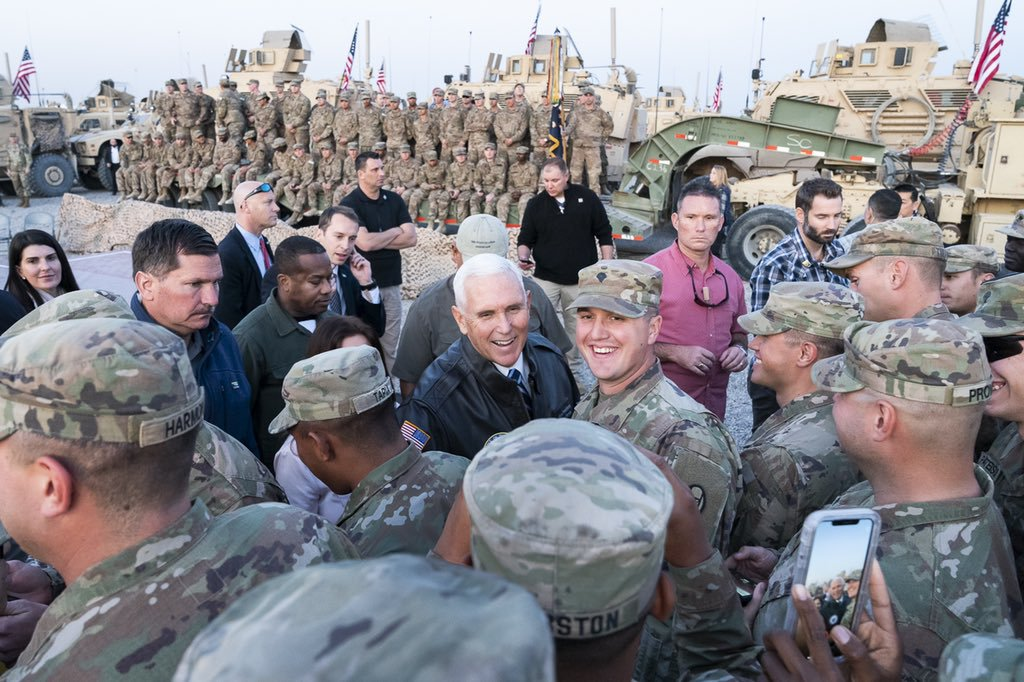
U.S. Vice President Mike Pence visiting the U.S. air base near the airport in 2019

The rocket attacks took place in Erbil, the capital of the autonomous Kurdistan Region of Iraq. The city has typically not seen the same kinds of violence as other parts of Iraq since the 2003 American invasion.

Tensions between the United States and Iran rose in January 2020, during the 2019–2021 Persian Gulf crisis, when the Iranian major general and commander of the Quds Force, Qasem Soleimani, and the commander of the Iranian-backed Kata'ib Hezbollah militia, Abu Mahdi al-Muhandis, were targeted and killed near Baghdad International Airport in Iraq by an American drone strike. The Trump administration justified the assassination of Soleimani, calling him an "imminent threat", while the Iranian authorities called it an "act of state terrorism". The Iranian Supreme Leader Ali Khamenei vowed to take "harsh revenge" against the U.S., while the Iranian President Hassan Rouhani also said that Iran "will take revenge". A few days later, Iran's Islamic Revolutionary Guard Corps launched the Operation Martyr Soleimani, attacking the American airbases in Iraq with ballistic missiles; no U.S. service member was killed, but 110 were later diagnosed with traumatic brain injuries.

Khamenei renewed his vows of avenging Soleimani in December 2020, and anti-American protests erupted in Baghdad in January 2021. The American government reduced its forces taking part in the Combined Joint Task Force – Operation Inherent Resolve (CJTF–OIR), the official name of the U.S.-led coalition that is fighting ISIS in Iraq and Syria, to 2,500 by the same month, with most of them being concentrated at the military complex near the Erbil International Airport.

Since 2019, Western military and diplomatic sites and personnel have been targeted by Katyushas, roadside explosives, and sometimes direct fire. Rocket attacks had frequently targeted the American presence in Baghdad, including the U.S. Embassy, as well as convoys ferrying materials for the U.S.-led coalition. The American government had blamed pro-Iranian paramilitary forces for the assaults, but the attacks targeting the Erbil International Airport or the Kurdistan Regional Government were extremely rare, with the February 2021 attack on the civilian airport being the first to strike the area since September 2020.

== Attacks ==
On 15 February 2021, at around 21:30 local time, approximately fourteen 107mm rockets were launched from an area south of Erbil near the border with Kirkuk Governorate, and three of them struck the section of the airport hosting U.S. and coalition partner forces. Sirens were sounded in the city, and several people were hospitalized. The airport was shut down and flights were halted due to safety concerns, while the Kurdish authorities cautioned Erbil's residents to stay away from targeted areas and to remain at home if possible.

Eight people were wounded during the attack including a U.S. service member who had a concussion.

== Perpetrators ==
The identity of the attackers was initially unclear, and no group immediately claimed responsibility for the attack. Iraqi security officials launched an investigation to determine the source of the attack on the same day, while American authorities stated that the U.S. will work with the Iraqi investigators to hold accountable those who were responsible.

A little-known Shiite armed group called Saraya Awliya al-Dam (Arabic: سرايا أولياء الدم, romanized: sarāyā ‘āwliyā‘ ad-dam, "Guardians of Blood Brigade"), claimed responsibility for the attack, but did not provide evidence of its role in the incident. The group, which according to some Iraqi officials has links with Iran, stated that it had opposed the "American occupation" and would carry out more attacks on the U.S. forces; however, according to Michael Knights, an expert on Iraq and Iran at The Washington Institute for Near East Policy, Iranian-backed Asa'ib Ahl al-Haq was the militia that was most likely to have been behind the attack. On 16 February, the spokesman for the Iranian Ministry of Foreign Affairs, Saeed Khatibzadeh, stated that Iran had opposed "any acts that harmed Iraq's security", and denied suggestions by some Iraqi officials that it had any link to Saraya Awliya al-Dam, condemning the "suspicious attempts to attribute [the attack] to Iran".

The spokesperson for the Kurdistan Democratic Party, Mahmoud Mohammed, stated that a group of fighters with ties to the Iraqi Popular Mobilization Forces (PMF) was responsible for the attacks. This was refuted by the head of relations at the PMF's Northern Front, Sayed Ali Hosseini. On 3 March, Iraqi Kurdistan's counter-terrorism unit published what appeared to be the "taped confession of one of the four alleged perpetrators" of the rocket attacks, who says he met one of the other perpetrators, belonging to Kata'ib Sayyid al-Shuhada, a paramilitary group part of the PMF. The conversation apparently blamed Iran for the attacks.

== Aftermath ==
The attack was the deadliest in a year on the U.S.-led military coalition in Iraq and the first time since late 2020 that Western military or diplomatic installations in Iraq were targeted. The attack, the most serious on the U.S.-led coalition since the Biden administration took power, sparked fears of escalation, and was deemed as the first serious test of U.S. President Joe Biden's policy towards Iran. According to Caroline Rose, a senior analyst at the Washington-based Newlines Institute for Strategy and Policy, the attack conveyed a message of intimidation to both the Biden administration and the federal Iraqi government. According to Jonathan Spyer, the executive director of the Middle East Center for Reporting and Analysis, the attack was an Iranian message to the newly elected Biden administration.

On 17 February, the American embassy in the Green Zone of Baghdad activated its own air defense system, and reconnaissance helicopters were flown over the area. The reason behind the decision was not announced. The following day, NATO announced that it will expand its security training mission in Iraq after a request by the Iraqi government, increasing the size of its forces from 500 to around 4,000 personnel.

On 25 February, the United States Air Force launched an airstrike against infrastructure related to Iranian-backed militias in Syria. The airstrike, which was authorized by U.S. President Biden, targeted Kata'ib Hezbollah and Kata'ib Sayyid al-Shuhada at a border control point in Abu Kamal District. The militias reported one death but local sources said seventeen were killed.

Another attack was launched against the airport in April 2021, was carried out by drone. No one was hurt in the blast but a building was damaged. France, Germany, Italy, Britain and the United States condemned the attacks. There was no immediate claim of responsibility for the airport drone attack, but Saraya Awliya al-Dam hailed the blast in pro-Iran channels on Telegram.

== Reactions ==
The Iraqi Prime Minister Mustafa al-Kadhimi called for an investigation into the attack, and the Iraqi President Barham Salih called the attack a "grave escalation", and that it "undermined efforts to secure the safety of Iraqi people". Iraqi military spokesman Yahya Rasoul stated that Iraq "will not accept becoming an arena for settling scores". The Prime Minister of Kurdistan Region, Masrour Barzani, condemned the attack. The American Secretary of State Antony Blinken "conveyed his outrage" and sent his condolences to the victims, while the White House press secretary Jen Psaki stated that the U.S. was "outraged" by the attack. U.S. Defense Secretary Lloyd Austin also condemned the attack, while the spokesperson for the State Department, Ned Price, stated that there will be consequences for those behind the attacks.

== See also ==
- 2004 Erbil bombings
- 2005 Erbil bombing
- 2013 Erbil bombings
- 2019 K-1 Air Base attack
- 2020 Camp Taji attacks
- 2021 Baghdad bombings
- 2022 Erbil missile attacks
- 2024 Erbil attack
- 2025 Iraq drone attacks
