= Qaysari Bazaar =

Type of bazaar in Kurdistan and Iraq

Coordinates: 36.18847°N 44.0097°E

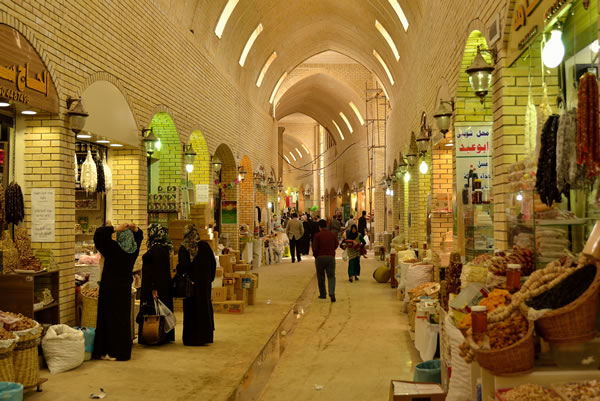
Qaysari Bazaar in Kurdistan

A Qaysari bazaar is a type of covered bazaar typical of Kurdistan and Iraq.

Arbil (Kurdish: Hawler) contains an extensive Qaysari, just south of the citadel in the center of town that was first established in the early 13th century AD. The Qaysari is entered through the numerous alleys that surround it. Once inside, shoppers walk through a maze of narrow paths between the shops, underneath a roof of corrugated metal. Most alleys feature a unique product that is sold by a majority of the vendors in that location. The northeast corner of the Qaysari contains a north-south alley offering honey and dairy products, such as yogurt and cheeses. Many shops offer Chai Kurdi (Kurdish tea) as a complimentary drink with good business from the local tea vendors in the bazaar. It is very popular prior to festivities such as Newroz (Kurdish New Year) in which business excels with larger crowds and customers.

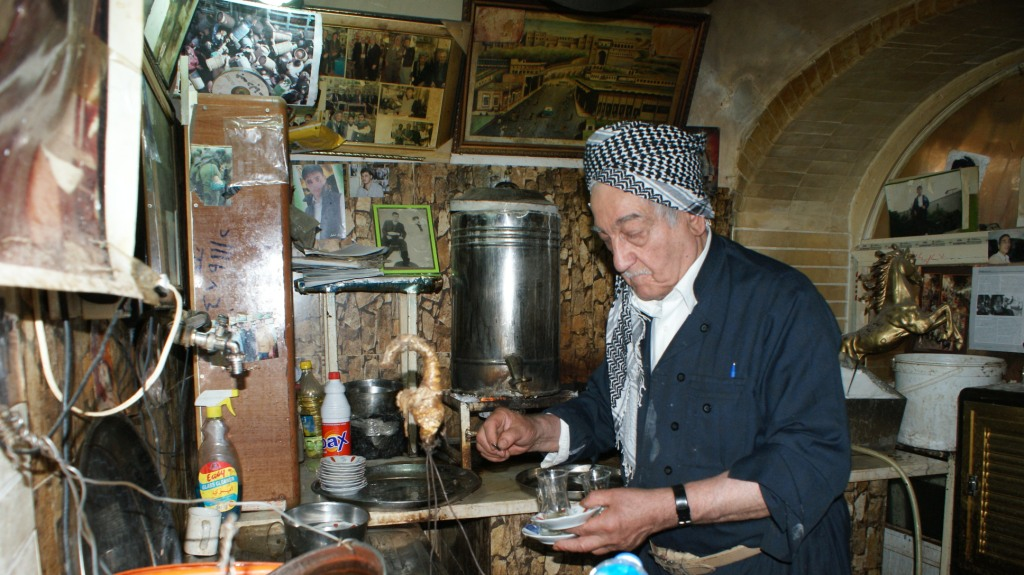
Mam Khalil's Tea shop in Qaysari Bazaar.

== See also ==
- Grand Bazaar, Isfahan
- Arabber
- Bazaar
- Maligaon
- Market (place)
- Peddler
- Retail
- Street vendor
- Street food
