= 2005 Erbil bombing =

2005 terrorist attack in Kurdistan

- Location: Erbil, Kurdistan Region
- Date: May 4, 2005
- Target: Police recruitment centre
- Attack type: Suicide bombing
- Deaths: 60
- Injuries: 150
- Perpetrator: Ansar al-Sunna

The 2005 Erbil bombing was a suicide attack on the offices of Kurdish political parties in Erbil, Kurdistan Region, on May 4, 2005. The attacker detonated explosives strapped to his body as people lined up outside a police recruiting center in Erbil. Ansar al-Sunna claimed responsibility. This attack is an example of religious terrorism, groups who commit terrorist acts because of religion believe that their deity or deities are on their side and that their violence is divinely inspired and approved. This attack is also an example of Strategic terrorism. Which is a form of terrorism where the terrorist plans to inflict mass casualties. The goals of Strategic terrorism are normally not local objectives but global objectives or regional objectives. Ansar al-Sunna's goal is to transform the country of Iraq into an Islamic state so their goals are regional.

== Ansar al-Sunna ==
Ansar al-Sunna stands for Supporters of Islam. "They are an militant Islamic Kurdish separatist movement seeking to transform Iraq into an Islamic state". This group has a Salafist worldview, which means that they insist on a puritanical form of Islam and they seek to emulate the practices of Muhammad. This movement was founded in 2001 by Mullah Krekar and they got financial and logistical help from al-Qaeda and Osama Bin laden. Some of the members of this organization transport money from Germany to northern Iraq to help finance the group. "This group targets secular Iraqi Kurds-particularly members of the Patriotic Union of Kurdistan (PUK)". Ansar was named a Foreign Terrorist Organization (FTO) by the U.S. Department of State on March 22, 2004. They are considered an active terrorist group in northern and central Iraq today. Ansar al-Islam operates primarily in northern and central Iraq and claims the second largest number of Sunni jihadist attacks in Iraq after Al-Qaeda. This organization is also known to behead their captives. The goal of Ansar-al Sunna is to have an Islamic country where its people are strong. There are a maximum of two thousand "hard fighters" in Ansar-al-Sunna.

== The bombing ==
In the bombing on May 4, 2005, the suicide bomber dressed up as a job seeker and blew himself up outside a police recruiting center in the Kurdish provincial capital, killing at least 60 Kurds, most of them prospective policemen, and wounding 150 others. This attack was intended as retribution for the involvement of Kurdish troops fighting insurgents alongside American forces. This bombing was the biggest act of terrorism in Iraq since early March 2005. Because the bomber could not get into the police recruiting center he detonated himself by the gate where young men gathered, killing 46, including the policeman standing outside of the recruiting center. Later it was found that a total of 60 people were found dead.

== Reasons for the conflict between Kurds and Ansar-al Sunna ==
The Kurdish Islamic Conflict began in 2001. In 2003, the conflict merged with the larger 2003 invasion of Iraq, which led to the defeat of Ansar al-Islam. After the invasion, Ansar al-Islam continued a low-level terrorist revolt against the Kurdish Democratic Party and the Patriotic Union of Kurdistan. Ansar al-Islam and its allied groups seized control of the area around Halabja from the PUK in late 2001 and that is why there is military conflict between them. Fighting continued throughout 2002. Ansar al-Sunna has tortured prisoners and executed PUK officials.

== Reason for the conflict between Baghdad and Erbil ==
Conflict has also arisen with the Kurds because they have aimed to retake Kirkuk and that has arisen some problems with the Arabs in Kirkuk. The Arabs have lived there for more than 30 years and they're reluctant to leave. One of the largest oilfields in the area lies underneath Kirkuk and that complicates the dispute. The conflict between the Kurdistan Region and Baghdad is mostly due to land. It has been difficult to resolve the conflict between Baghdad and Erbil because it dates back decades and has a lot to do with natural resources. It seems that the Kurdistan Region is reluctant to renounce their claim of the land and this conflict might take some 50 to 100 years to resolve.

== See also ==
- 2004 Erbil bombings
- 2013 Erbil bombings
- 2021 Erbil missile attacks
- 2022 Erbil missile attacks
- 2024 Erbil attack
