= Nawzad Hadi Mawlood =

Iraqi Kurdish politician

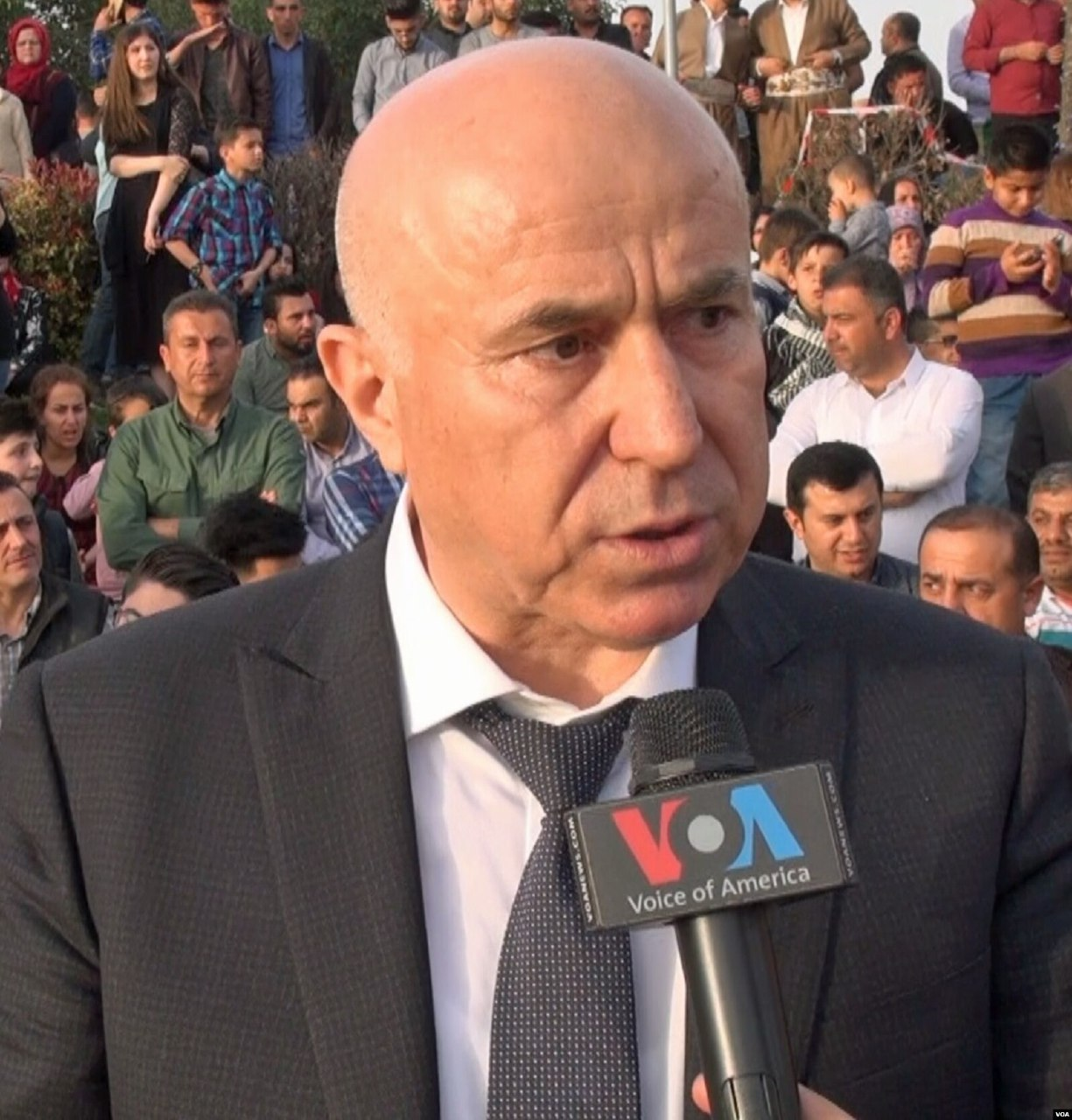
Nawzad Hadi

Nawzad Hadi Mawlood (Kurdish: نەوزاد هادی) is the former Governor of Erbil Province. Hadi was born to Kurd parents in Erbil in 1963, and he took over as governor in 2004. Nawzad Hadi resigned from being governor on the 10th of September 2019 and was replaced by Firsat Sofi Ali. He was one of the main heads of the KDP in Erbil.

Political offices
Preceded by Akram Muntek	Governor of Erbil Province; 2004–2019	Succeeded by Firsat Sofi
