= Hawler Medical University =

Public university in Erbil, Iraq

Coordinates: 36°11′31″N 44°2′15″E

- زانكۆی هه‌ولێری پزیشكی
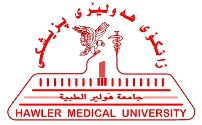
- Established: 2005
- President: Prof. Dr. Dashti Al-Bustani
- Vice-president: Assist. Prof. Dr. Hawre Mustafa
- Vice-Chancellor: Dr. Karwan M.Amen
- Location: Erbil, Erbil Governorate, Iraqi Kurdistan, Iraq
- Website: hmu.edu.krd

Hawler Medical University (Kurdish: Zankoy Hewlêrî Pizîşkî/زانكۆی هه‌ولێری پزیشكی) is a public university located in the heart of Erbil, the capital city of the Kurdistan Region of Iraq. It was established in 2005 by the Kurdistan Regional Government's Council of Ministers. The university was founded to house the medical colleges that were previously part of the Salahaddin University-Erbil. The overall goal of Hawler Medical University's formation was to strengthen medical education in the Kurdistan region, as well as to have better and more effective college management.

Hawler Medical University, Iraq's first medical group of a university, offers undergraduate and postgraduate education in a variety of medical and health fields. The university currently encompasses five colleges: College of Medicine, College of Dentistry, College of Pharmacy, College of Nursing, and College of Health Sciences, in addition to a number of research centers. It has two main campuses, both located in the heart of Erbil.

== University administration ==
The University Council is the university's highest decision-making body. The university's council meets on a regular basis to debate the university's overall strategy and aims, make decisions on topics under its jurisdiction, and make recommendations to the Ministry of Higher Education and Scientific Research. The University Council sessions are led by the president of the university.

President: Prof. Dr. Ali Al - Dabagh

Vice President for Scientific Affairs: Asst. Prof. Dr. Karwan M-Amen

Vice President for Administrative and Financial Affairs: Asst. Prof. Dr. Hawri M. Baker

Vice President for Students Affairs:

== Colleges of Hawler Medical University ==
=== 2.1 College of Medicine ===
Hawler Medical University's College of Medicine is the oldest medical school in Iraq's Kurdistan region. It began as a part of Sulaimaniyah University in 1977, and in 1981, it became one of Salahaddin University's colleges. In 2005, Hawler Medical University took over the administration of the College. The College of Medicine is composed of the following academic departments:

==== Department of Medical Education ====
this consists of themes related to Bioethics and Professionalism, Communication Skills, Personal Development, Clinical and Procedural Skills, and the Pedagogy and CME Courses.

==== Department of Medicine ====
This has themes of General and Specific Specialties in Internal Medicine.

==== Department of Obstetrics and Gynecology ====
This has themes of General and Specific OBGYN Specialties.

==== Department of Psychiatry ====
This has themes of General and Specific Psychiatric Specialties.

==== Department of Pediatrics ====
This has themes of General and Specific Pediatric Specialties.

==== Department of Surgery ====
This has themes of General and Specific Surgical Specialties.

==== Department of Microbiology, Physiology, and Genetics ====
This has the following units:

- Microbiology and Immunology
- Medical Physiology
- Medical Genetics and Molecular Biology

==== Department of Biochemistry, Biophysics, and Pharmacology ====
This has the following units:

- Biophysics
- Biochemistry
- Pharmacology

==== Department of Anatomy and Pathology ====
This has the following units:

- Anatomy
- Embryology
- Cytology
- Histology
- Histopathology
- Hematopathology

==== Department of Community Medicine ====
This consists of core concepts in all Community Medicine fields.

=== Locations ===
The academic departments listed above are all dispersed in various locations within the HMU-CoM campus. Most Basic (or Foundational) Science Departments are found within the Old (or Laboratory) buildings, whilst the Clinical and Hybrid Departments are found within the deanery building. The old building also features state-of-the-art laboratory and hospital simulation facilities, undergraduate lecture halls, and mixed-use seminar halls. The registration building offers further lecture halls and workgroup discussion hubs suited for the modernized medical curricula.

=== College of Dental Medicine (Dentistry) ===
College of Dentistry was established in 1995 at Salahaddin University-Erbil. After that, its management changed to Hawler Medical University in 2005. The college has seven departments:

- Conservative Dentistry
- Oral and Maxillofacial Surgery
- Periodontology
- Pedodontics, Orthodontics and Preventive Dentistry (POP)
- Prosthodontics
- Basic Sciences
- Oral Diagnosis and Oral Medicine

== College of Pharmacy ==
The College of Pharmacy was the first pharmacy school founded in Iraq's Kurdistan region. The university of Salahaddin-Erbil established the college in 1997. After that, the management is changed to Hawler Medical University. The college has five departments:

- Pharmacognosy
- Pharmaceutical Chemistry
- Pharmacology
- Pharmaceutics
- Clinical Analysis

== College of Nursing ==
This college was established in 2002 and currently it has two departments:

- Nursing
- Midwifery

== College of Health Sciences ==
The College of Health Sciences' mission is to educate and develop highly competent and trained medical laboratory technologists for use in the healthcare system. College of Health Sciences, which was formed in 2012. It has three departments and two additional department are planned to be opened for students in 2022-2023.

- Medical Microbiology
- Clinical Biochemistry
- Physiotherapy
- Clinical Nutrition
- Public Health

== The centers of Hawler Medical University ==
=== Medical Research Center ===
Hawler Medical University's Medical Research Center was established in 2008. The Medical Research Center is a non-profit government organization. The center aspires to be a ground-breaking research facility in Erbil and the Kurdistan region.

=== Career Development Center ===
The HMU Career Development Center will work to develop talented and active students as well as engage them with the private sector in order to increase their prospects of finding work in future.

=== Women's Health Center ===
The Center for Research and Education in Women's Health (CREWH) was founded as a product of a US embassy-funded IREX initiative in partnership with the State University of New York at Albany.

=== Pedagogy Center ===
The goal of this center is to boost faculty research capabilities. Increasing the effectiveness of educational methods. Improving the faculty's information and communication technology (ICT). Develop Current assessment instruments and strategies for their usage. And to create an environment that is conducive to e-learning and blended learning.

== Admission ==
Local high school graduates can apply to Hawler Medical University’s Bachelor degree through Ministry of Higher Education and Scientific Research’s Online Central Student Board Application System (AKA Zankoline). Zankoline website accept application at the end of each academic year. International students are advised to contact admission office before their application at info@hmu.edu.krd.

== Libraries ==
There are six libraries that serves books and post graduate thesis and dissertations across Hawler Medical University’s two campuses:

- Library of the College of Medicine
- Library of the College of Dental Medicine/Dentistry
- Library of the College of Pharmacy
- Library of the College of Nursing
- Library of the College of Health Sciences
- Library of the Medical Research Center

== Scientific journals ==
Hawler Medical University's journals are

- Zanco Journal of Medical Sciences
- Erbil Dental Journal
- Erbil Journal of Nursing and Midwifery

== See also ==
- List of universities in Iraq
