= 2020 Camp Taji attacks =

2020 rocket attacks on Baghdad

- Part of 2019–2021 Persian Gulf crisis
- Type: 32 Iranian 107mm (Katyusha launcher)(Per U.S.)
- Location: Camp Taji, Taji, Iraq
- Target: Combined Joint Task Force – Operation Inherent Resolve
- Date: 11 March 2020; 14 March 2020
- Executed by: Disputed (Kata'ib Hezbollah alleged); League of Revolutionaries
- Casualties: (United States) 2 soldiers killed (11 March) (United Kingdom) 1 soldier killed (11 March); 14 Coalition personnel wounded (11 March); 3 American Coalition personnel wounded (14 March); 2 Iraqi soldiers wounded (14 March)

The 2020 Camp Taji attacks were rocket attacks that took place on 11 March and 14 March 2020, targeting Camp Taji, north of Baghdad, in Baghdad Governorate, which hosts Coalition and United States Forces in Iraq (Combined Joint Task Force – Operation Inherent Resolve). Three coalition soldiers were killed with 18 coalition soldiers being wounded.

== Attacks ==
On 11 March 2020, 29 rockets impacted Camp Taji, killing two Americans, and one British soldier from the Royal Army Medical Corps who was attached to the Irish Guards. The attack left 14 other US soldiers, contractors and coalition personnel wounded, five of them critically. One of the coalition wounded was identified as a Polish soldier.

On 14 March 2020, before 11:00 AM, another rocket attack took place at Camp Taji; over 25 107mm Type 63 Chinese rockets struck the coalition compound and the Iraqi Air defenses facilities, and three other coalition soldiers and two Iraqi soldiers. Iraqi forces subsequently found seven multiple rocket launchers with 24 unlaunched rockets.

== U.S. response ==
On 11 March, three warplanes targeted the area near the Syrian town of Al-Bukamal and Iraq's Al-Anbar province. The US Department of Defense reported that 4 weapons depots, a propellant production plant, and a ballistic missile depot were targeted.

On 13 March after midnight, the U.S. launched air raids against Kata'ib Hezbollah facilities in Karbala, and other militia groups under the Popular Mobilization Forces (PMF) in Babylon. The raids killed three Iraqi soldiers, two policemen and one civilian. 11 Iraqi soldiers were wounded as well as five PMF fighters.

== Reactions to response ==
The Iraqi military and religious authorities condemned the strikes undertaken by the US and UK in response to the attacks, and the Iraqi Minister of Foreign Affairs, Mohamed Ali Alhakim, summoned the U.S. and British ambassadors over the bombing and an emergency meeting was held to determine what actions will be taken in the future. The Iraqi Joint Operations Command said that the claim that the airstrike was in response to the initial attack on the base lead "to escalation and does not provide a solution". Iraqi authorities stated that the "new U.S. air attack went against 'any partnership'". In addition, the Spokesperson for the Ministry of Foreign Affairs of Iran, Abbas Mousavi, said that the attacks are related to the U.S. "presence and behaviour" in Iraq.
