= Ansar ul Islam =

Ansar ul Islam or Ansar al-Islam (Arabic: انصار الاسلام; "Partisans of Islam" or "Helpers of Islam") may refer to:

- Ansar al-Islam in Kurdistan, a Kurdish Salafist group in Northern Iraq.
- Jama'at Ansar al-Islam, a Kurdish-dominated Salafist group in Iraq and Syria.
- Ansar al-Islam (Bangladesh) also called Ansarullah Bangla Team, a radical islamist group in Bangladesh.
- Ansar ul-Islam (Pakistan), a Barelvi Sunni Muslim group in the Khyber Agency, Federally Administered Tribal Areas, Pakistan.
- Ansarul Islam (Kashmir), founded in 1983 and merged into Hizbul Mujahideen in 1989.
- Ansarul Islam (Sahel), an organization in Burkina Faso and Mali.
- Jabhat Ansar al-Islam, Syrian rebel group.
- Ansar-ul-Hussain, a Shia Pakistani group which was allegedly responsible for recruiting fighters for Liwa Zainabiyoun.
