= 2004 Erbil bombings =

Double suicide attack in Iraq

2004 Erbil bombing
- Part of Iraqi insurgency (2003–2006) in Iraqi insurgency (2003–2011)
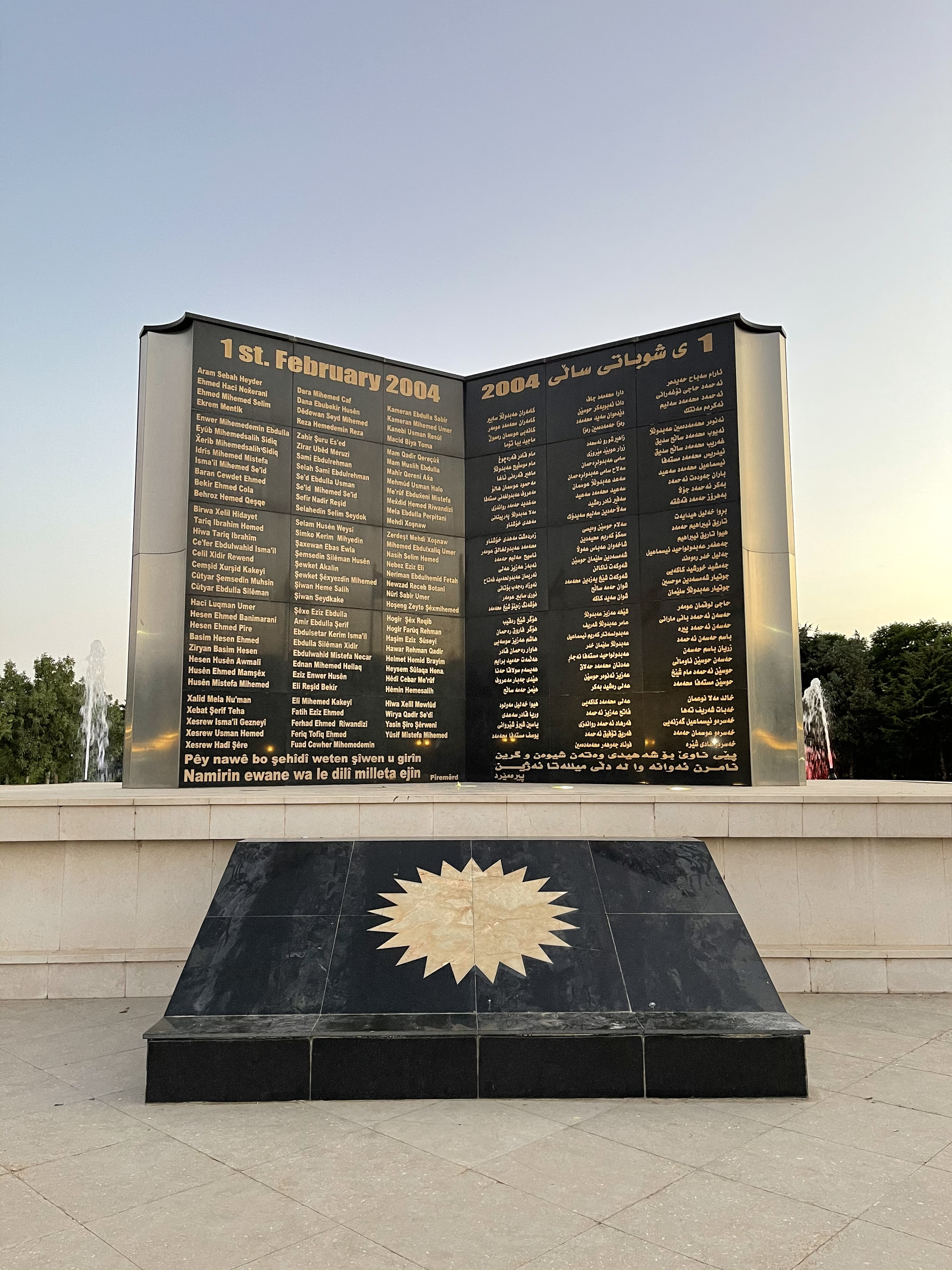
- Memorial of 2004 Erbil bombing in Sami Abdul Rahman Park
- Location: Erbil, Kurdistan Region
- Date: 1 February 2004
- Target: Headquarters of PUK and KDP
- Attack type: Suicide bombings
- Deaths: 101 killed (PDK claim); 105 killed (PUK claim)
- Injuries: 133
- Perpetrators: Unknown (Alleged to be either Al-Qaeda, Ansar al-Islam in Kurdistan or the Sheikh Zana network)
- Assailant: 2 Unknown men

The 2004 Erbil bombings was a double suicide attack on the offices of Iraqi Kurdish political parties in Erbil, Kurdistan Region on 1 February 2004. The attackers detonated explosives strapped to their bodies as hundreds gathered to celebrate Eid Al-Adha in Erbil.

A former government minister, the deputy governor of Erbil Governorate and the city's police chief were among those killed at the offices of the Kurdistan Region's main political groups, the Kurdistan Democratic Party (KDP) and the Patriotic Union of Kurdistan (PUK). The attacks occurred as party leaders were receiving hundreds of visitors to mark the start of Eid.

The Al-Hayat newspaper allegedly speculated that the bombings may have been retribution for the capture of bin Laden's courier Hassan Ghul in The Kurdistan Region.

The Sheikh Zana network was accused by the Kurdistan Regional of involvement in the bombings, the network also had ties to Ansar al-Islam and Ansar al-Sunna.

"We have no group that's claimed responsibility," Coalition Provisional Authority spokesman Dan Senor said, saying al Qaeda or Ansar al-Islam, a Kurdish Islamist group with suspected al Qaeda ties, could be responsible. "It could be any number of groups attempting to operate inside Iraq," he added.

== See also ==
- 2005 Erbil bombing
- 2013 Erbil bombings
- 2021 Erbil missile attacks
