= 2013 Erbil bombings =

Vehicle bombings in Erbil, Iraq

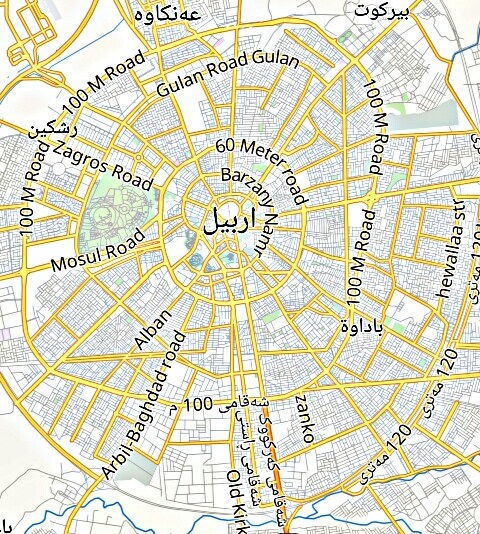
- Arbil Map
- Location: Erbil, Kurdistan Region
- Date: 29 September 2013 (UTC+3)
- Attack type: car bombs
- Deaths: 11
- Injuries: 40+
- Perpetrator: Unknown: legal proceedings have not yet taken place.

The 2013 Erbil bombings were two coordinated suicide car bombings attacks in the Iraqi Kurdistan capital, Erbil on 29 September 2013. At least eleven people were killed in the attack and over 40 injured. The suicide attacks happened at entrance an Asayesh headquarter and also near Iraqi Kurdistan ministry of Interior building.

== See also ==
- 2004 Erbil bombings
- 2005 Erbil bombing
- 2021 Erbil missile attacks
