= Saeed Qazaz =

Iraqi politician (1904–1959)

Saeed Qazaz-Salih also known as Saeed al-Qazaz was a leading politician from Iraq's noble class. He was born in 1904 into a aristocratic family of land barons in the Khurmatu District of Iraq. In 1924 he became a Secretary to Captain Lane, Mufti of the British Administration in Sulaymaniyah until the Fourteenth of July Revolution. He has held several administrative positions, including the director of Tanjaro district, governor of Halabja and Zakho, governor of Erbil, Kut, Kirkuk and Mosul. He was also the Iraqi Interior Minister during the monarchy. After the revolution, Abdulkarim Qasim surrendered to the revolution and was taken prisoner. He held a social circle with King Faisal II.

His famous saying is often repeated in Iraq: “When he walks towards the gallows and death is near, he sees many people under his feet who do not deserve to live.” Saeed Qazaz did not publicly belong to any political party or group.

== Biography ==
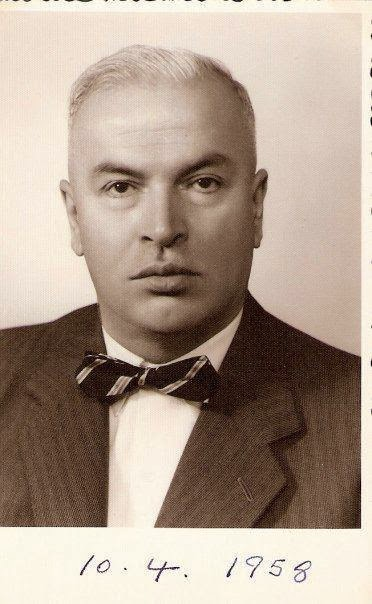
Saeed Qazaz

Saeed al-Qazzaz held various positions throughout his life, including serving as an officer in the Administrative Inspection Directorate in Sulaymaniyah and as the director of Tanjaro district. He was later transferred to Erbil, where he also served as the district director. Following this, he was appointed the mayor of Zakho district. He was then transferred to Baghdad, where he became the Director general of the local administration. Qazzaz later served as the Mutasarrif (governor) of the Erbil Brigade, followed by the Kut Brigade and the Kirkuk Brigade. He then became the Mutasarrif of the Mosul Brigade.

In 1952, Qazzaz was appointed Minister of Social Affairs, and in 1953, he became the first Iraqi to hold the position of director of Iraqi ports, a role that had been occupied by the British since 1919. He remained in this position until February 28, 1954. Qazzaz then served as the Minister of the Interior in successive government ministries until the last government of the Kingdom of Iraq.

=== Political Reports ===
Saeed Qazzaz reported to Parliament that subversive groups, with a diplomatic mission in Iraq, were actively working against the Baghdad Pact. He specifically pointed out that an Arab nation, which he clarified to be Egypt, was assisting extremists in planning an assassination.

=== Responsibilities ===
Saeed Qazzaz, along with some members of the local population, played an influential role in the community. After approximately a month, Mr. Qazzaz, a native of Sulaymaniyah, became involved in the local school system. He was an English teacher in the primary schools, contributing significantly to the educational development of the region.

Saeed Al-Qazaz was a former minister in the government of the deposed king. Known for his valor and bravery, Al-Qazaz earned high regard among the local population.

== Political career ==
The Ministry of Social Affairs in Iraq had a short-lived tenure under the government headed by Nureddin Mahmud. The position was briefly held by Qazzaz from 21 December 1952 to 22 January 1953, with Maijd Mustafa both preceding and succeeding him, indicating a brief shift in leadership during this time.

In the first term of the Minister of Interior of Iraq, from 8 March 1954 to 7 June 1957, the role saw considerable shifts under three different heads of government: Muhammad Fadhel al-Jamali, Arshad al-Umari, and Nuri as-Said. This period involved overseeing national security, public order, and administrative functions vital to Iraq's governance. The individual in this role replaced Muhammad Fadhel al-Jamali and was succeeded by Sami Fattah at the end of the term.

The second term of the Minister of Interior occurred from 3 March 1958 to 14 July 1958, during a period of significant political upheaval just before the 1958 Iraqi Revolution. Serving under the leadership of Nuri as-Said and Ahmad Mukhtar Baban, the individual in this role replaced Sami Fattah. Following the revolution, the individual was succeeded by Abdul Salam Arif as Iraq's political landscape dramatically shifted. The Ministry of the Interior had critical responsibilities in overseeing law enforcement, security, and political stability during this volatile period in Iraq's history.

== Mam Jalal in the description of Saeed Qazaz ==
'Saeed Qazaz was a conservative Kurdish figure known for his strong personal beliefs and intellectual independence. He was self-educated in the fields of political and social work, despite the support he received from his uncle, Tofiq Qazazi, who assisted him in various aspects of his life, including personal matters. While Qazaz is often associated with pro-British sentiments, there is no substantial evidence to suggest that he acted as a spy or foreign agent. Rather, he held the view that the British played a critical role in Kurdish political development.

Qazaz believed that education was the key to social progress for the Kurdish people. He advocated for the importance of learning and intellectual growth, viewing education as essential for achieving political and social advancement. His ideas were rooted in the conviction that the Kurds’ future depended on their ability to educate themselves and engage in the political process, regardless of external influences.'
