= Time in Iraq =

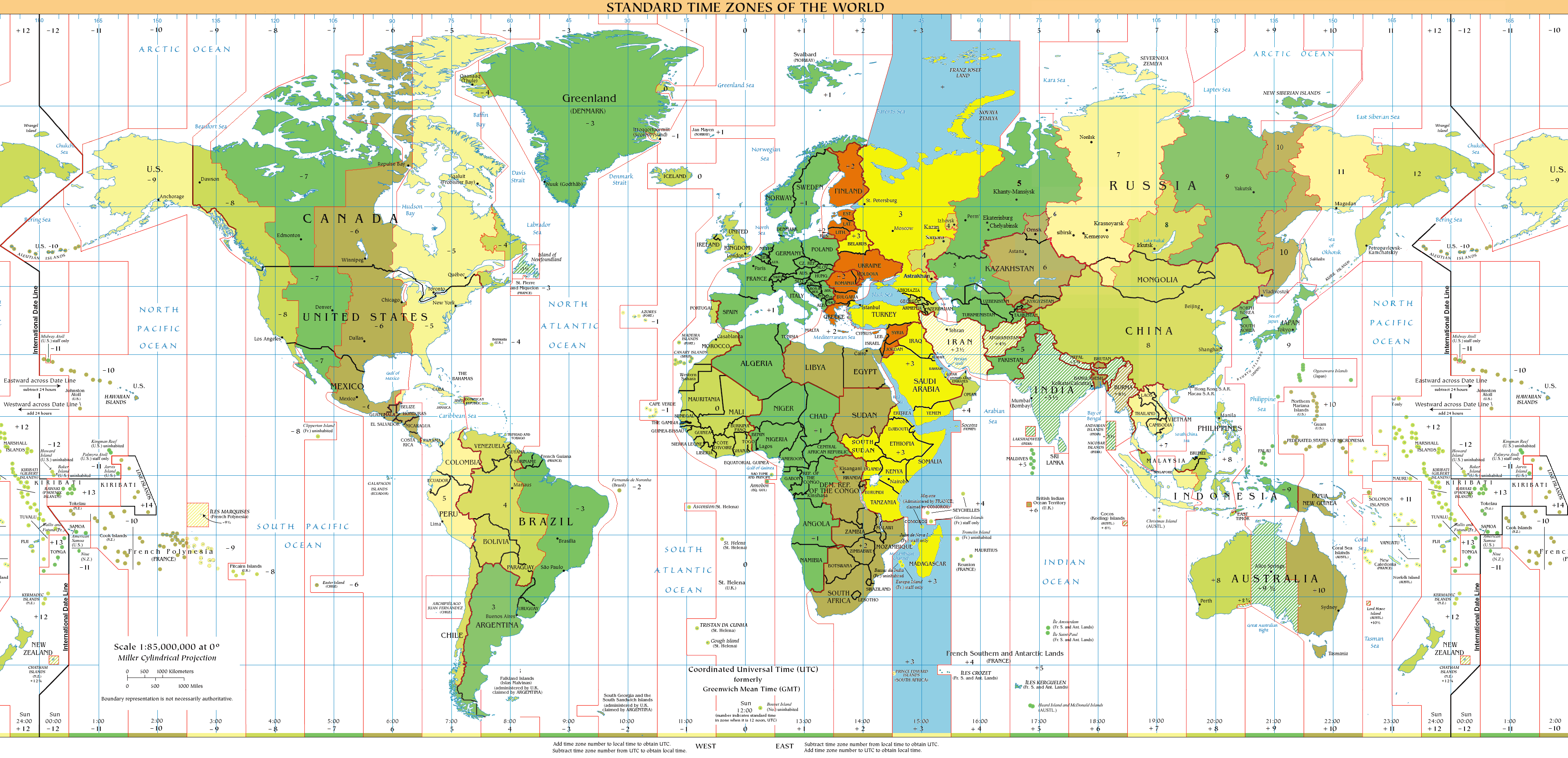
UTC+03:00 time zone (blue)

Time in Iraq is given by Arabia Standard Time (AST) (UTC+03:00). Iraq does not currently observe daylight saving time.
