= Salahaddin University-Erbil =

Public higher education institution in the Kurdistan Region

Salahaddin University-Erbil-Iraq
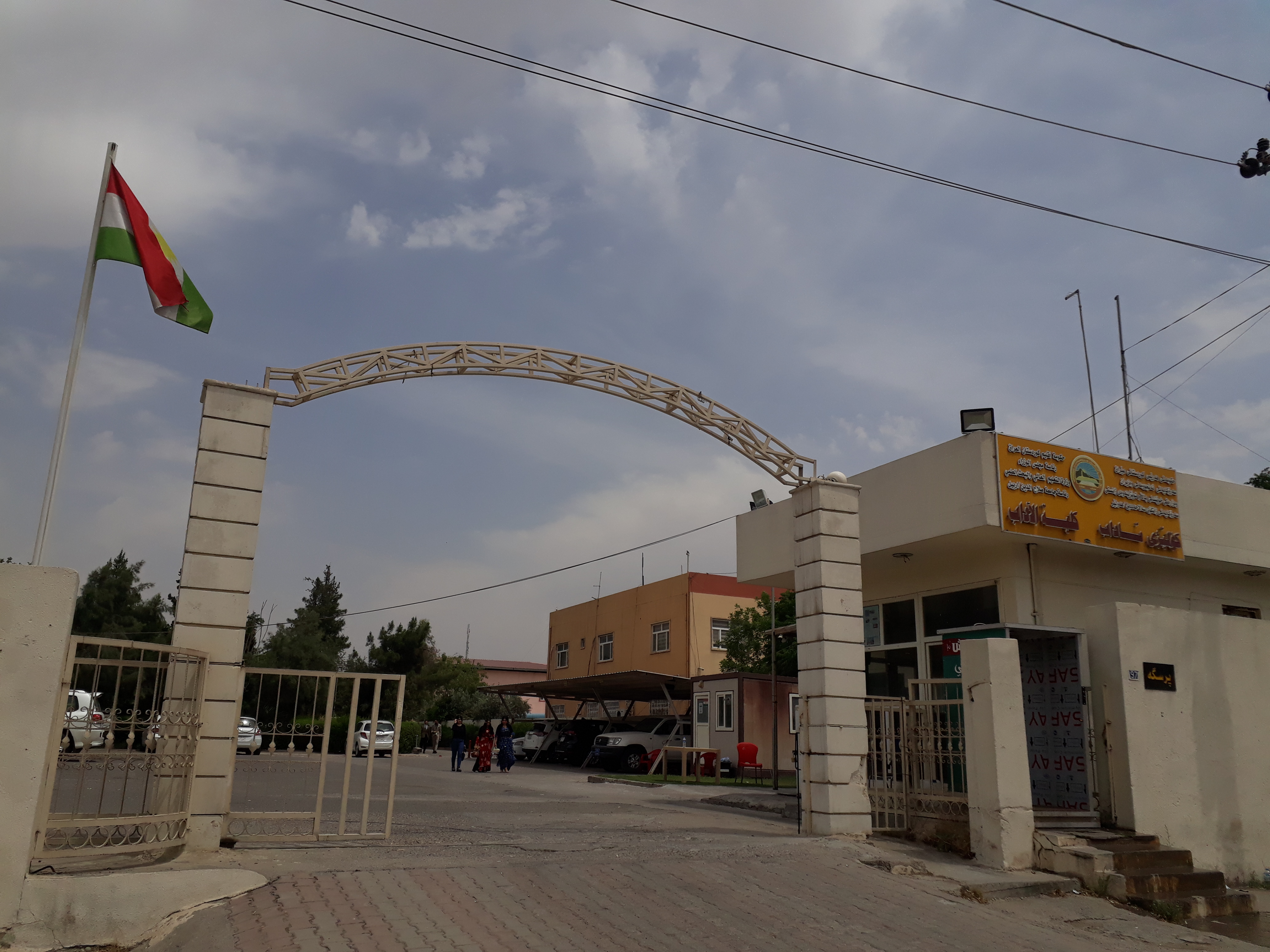
- Type: Public
- Established: 1968 in Sulaymaniyah; 1981 moved to Erbil
- President: Dr. Kamaran Younis
- Undergraduates: +25,000
- Postgraduates: +2,400
- Location: Erbil, Kurdistan, Iraq
- Campus: Urban
- Colors: Maroon
- Website: su.edu.krd

Salahaddin University-Erbil-Iraq (Zankoy Selahedîn-Hewlêr, زانکۆی سەلاحەدین-هەولێر-عێراق in Kurdish) is a public university located in Erbil, capital of the autonomous Kurdistan Region of Iraq. Sulaimani University was established in 1968. It was moved to Erbil in 1981 and changed its name to Salahaddin university. In 2005, the departments of Medicine, Dentistry, Nursing, and Pharmacy split from Salahaddin University to establish Hawler Medical University.

Initially, the university included seven colleges: Science, Agriculture, Engineering, Administration, Arts, Education, and Medicine. In 1985, a college of Law and Politics was added, followed by the college of Dentistry in 1995. The University is a member of the International Association of Universities (listed under the Iraq section with its Kurdish name Zankoy Salahaddin) and grants various academic degrees and certificates to qualified individuals, including Bachelor of Arts (BA), Bachelor of Science (BSc), Master of Arts (MA), Master of Science (MSc), and Doctorate of Philosophy (PhD). A Medical degree (MD) is also granted by the Medical College.

== Faculties and colleges ==
- College of Science
- College of Engineering
- College of Agriculture Engineering Sciences
- College of Education
- College of Arts
- College of Languages
- College of Administration and Economics
- College of Law
- College of Political Science
- College of Basic Education
- College of Physical Education and Sport Sciences
- College of Islamic Studies
- College of Fine Arts
- College of Shaqlawa Education
- College of Makhmoor Education
- College of Veternary Medicine
- College of Medicine (Soon)

== Notable alumni ==
The university has more than 100,000 alumni, including Nawzad Hadi, The Governor of Erbil, Yousif Mohammed, The President of Kurdistan Parliament, and Nouri al-Maliki, ex-Prime Minister of Iraq.

== See also ==
- List of universities in Iraq
