= Battle of Altun Kupri (2017) =

2017 battle between Iraq and Peshmerga

- Part of the Battle of Kirkuk (2017) during the 2017 Iraqi–Kurdish conflict
- Iraqi forces' advances in Kirkuk Governorate during the battle
Date	20 October 2017
Location	Altun Kupri, Kirkuk Governorate, Iraq
Result	Iraqi victory
Territorial changes	Iraqi forces capture Altun Kupri and adjacent Erbil–Kirkuk checkpoint; Iraqi forces defeat Peshmerga and recapture the entire Kirkuk province

Belligerents
Iraq	Kurdistan Region

Commanders and leaders
(Iraq) Haider al-Abadi (Commander-in-chief) (Iraq) Maj. Gen. Ma’an al Saadi (ISOF-2 Commander) (Iraq) Brig. Gen. Raad Baddai (Iran) Maj. Gen. Qasem Soleimani (Iran) Gen. Zeriva Abu Yasser (KIA) (Iranian PMU General)	(Kurdistan Region) Masoud Barzani (Commander-in-chief) (Kurdistan Region) Maj. Gen Sirwan Barzani (Zeravani commander) (Kurdistan Region) Sarbast Lazgin (Deputy Minister of Peshmerga) (Kurdistan Region) Anwari Haji Othman (Peshmerga Commander) (Kurdistan Region) Jamal Kirkuki; Hussein Yazdanpanah (PAK General)

Units involved
Iraq; Iraqi Armed Forces; Iraqi Ground Forces; 9th Armoured Division; CTS - ISOF; Iraqi Police; Popular Mobilization Forces; Saraya al-Khorasani; Turkmen Brigades; Hezbollah Brigades; Badr Brigades; Asa'ib Ahl al-Haq; Supported by: Iran; IRGC; Quds Force	Kurdistan Region; Peshmerga; Zeravani; First Support Forces; CTG Special Forces; Kurdistan Freedom Party; 5th Brigade

Strength
12,000	Unknown

Casualties and losses
Per Iraq; 2 killed 1 tank destroyed Per Kurdistan Region; 12 Humvees, 1 M1A1 Abrams, 1 T-72	Per Kurdistan Region; 27 killed 67 wounded
- Civilians (per AP): 6 killed, 15 wounded

The Battle of Altun Kupri (Note: Arabic: معركة ألتون كوبري; or Battle of Pirdê (in Kurdish media) Kurdish: شەڕی پردێ, romanized: Şerî Pirdê)) occurred on 20 October 2017 during the Battle of Kirkuk, between the Iraqi Army supported by the Popular Mobilization Forces with intelligence allegedly provided by Iran, and the KDP Peshmerga, supported by PAK and Kurdish locals. The battle began in the early morning, and at 10 a.m., Iraqi forces pushed through Altun Kupri capturing it completely.

== Background ==
The battle was part of the five-day-long Battle of Kirkuk (2017), which was marked by disorganization among Kurdish forces, largely caused by accusations of betrayal, ultimately forcing them to retreat towards the direction of Altun Kupri.

On 16 October 2017, a group of Peshmerga stationed in Dibis led by Jamal Kirkuki withdrew across the Little Zab river to take up defensive positions on the right bank of the river near Altun Kupri. Another group of Kirkuki's forces alongside PAK Peshmerga led by Hussein Yazdanpanah moved over the Qeredax mountains to the village of Kitka, which was located on the southern entrance of Altun Kupri.

On 19 October 2017, before the battle, clashes occurred on the southern entrance of Altun Kupri near the Kurdish positions in Kitka between Peshmerga and the PMU. This led to the destruction of a PMU Humvee.

== Battle ==
The battle began at 6:00 a.m. on 20 October 2017, when Iraqi forces began to rain artillery (likely M198), tank and mortar fire on Kurdish units near Altun Kupri and its surroundings, with the help of IRGC artillery experts, forcing the Peshmerga to retreat through the town to positions beyond it in a row of hills. An apparent 81-millimeter mortar exploded not far from a group of Kurdish generals standing outside a command post and another one hit a vehicle of the Zerevani. The artillery fire also hit civilian homes. Kurdish support units based on the outskirts of the Erbil governorate responded with their own, much weaker artillery.

The Iraqi ground attack commenced from three axes. From the west near the town of Dibis, from the east near the village of Qarabag, and Kitka, southern Altun Kupri. Kurdish forces near Kitka, Altun Kupri and other areas withdrew under heavy fire along the Erbil–Kirkuk Road through Altun Kupri until they reached the checkpoint demarking the Erbil and Kirkuk governorates. The checkpoint, which was known as the 'last line' and served as a FOB, had berms and was manned by Peshmerga soldiers. By 9:00 a.m. Peshmerga and locals were again forced to retreat by the advancing Iraqi forces, and the former subsequently stationed at the hills of the Qeredax mountain range behind the checkpoint, which formed a unique strategic “cauldron”, which the Kurdish forces utilized by establishing new positions on them.

At 10:00 a.m., after hours of artillery bombardment against the Peshmerga, Iraqi units began advancing towards the rest of Altun Kupri. Iraqi forces pushed through the town, capturing it nearly unhindered until they reached the town’s bridge which spans across the Little Zab. When Iraqi Humvee’s crossed, an explosion erupted, tearing two vehicles into the river. The bridge was sabotaged by sappers during the earlier retreat of the Peshmerga forces. The other side of the bridge was still intact, as well as a smaller bridge in the town’s south, which connects a river island to the Kurdish side. Iraqi forces continued their push across the river despite the sabotage attempts, where they were met by heavy fire from the Peshmerga ‘cauldron’, which now consisted of a few hundred KDP and PAK Peshmerga, and Zerevani forces. Among light weapons the Kurds used .50-caliber machine guns, truck mounted field guns, and anti-tank weapons like the German MILAN, Panzerfaust 3, and the Chinese HJ-8. Ercuman Turkmen, a PMU commander, said from inside the town his forces were being targeted by sniper fire.

By 11:00 a.m. Kurdish attempts to battle the advancing Iraqi forces proved futile as Altun Kupri and the Erbil–Kirkuk checkpoint were under complete control of the Iraqi forces, and they came as close as 700m to the retreated Kurdish positions at the Qeredax hills. Footage of a destroyed Iraqi M1 Abrams tank was later shared on Twitter. It was not clear whether it was lost in battle or deliberately destroyed by Iraqis to prevent its capture.

There were reports of Shia militias firing artillery and mortars towards the retreated Peshmerga.

By mid-day a significant amount of Peshmerga reinforcements, including armored vehicles and CTG special forces, arrived from Qushtapa to aid the retreated Peshmerga.

Kurdish forces stayed behind the line they had withdrawn to and it was not clear at the time whether or not the Iraqi forces sought to advance beyond the captured town. Earlier however, when they captured Dibs, Kitka and the town itself, they did so with ease and Peshmerga could not withstand Iraqi firepower.

Ultimately, Iraqi forces successfully pushed Peshmerga out of Altun Kupri completely and established control over the adjacent Erbil–Kirkuk checkpoint.

A security source told Agence France-Presse that:

army units, federal police, and counter-terrorism forces entered the center of Altun Kupri district amid clashes, but they managed to storm it and raise the Iraqi flag on the district building.

The security official confirmed that "residents welcomed the Iraqi forces with joy and ululations". The commander of the southern Kirkuk axis in the Peshmerga forces, a leader in the Patriotic Union of Kurdistan party, Westa Rasul, stated that "the battle in Kirkuk resulted in the killing of 26 Peshmerga fighters and the wounding of 67 others."

== Aftermath ==
The battle was the last one fought during the Battle of Kirkuk of the 2017 Iraqi-Kurdish conflict which resulted in Iraqi forces successfully regaining control of 40% of territory hitherto controlled by the Kurds.

=== Little Zab Bridge ===
The Peshmerga's attempt to destroy the bridge, spanning across the Little Zab, has left it damaged and unusable until it was repaired in 2020, when the Erbil and Baghdad governments eventually agreed to jointly build a steel bridge.

=== In Kurdish propaganda ===
Despite the Iraqi forces successfully capturing Altun Kupri and therefore the entirety of Kirkuk governorate, and the overall Kirkuk campaign being a clear Iraqi victory, some Kurdish media continue to consider the battle a Kurdish victory, claiming that they ended the Iraqi forces' "proclaimed march toward Erbil", even though the then-Prime Minister Haider al-Abadi had explicitly ordered the Iraqi forces not to advance beyond the City. Some Kurdish media have even nicknamed it "The Epic Battle of Pirdê", calling it "another proud chapter in Kurdistan's liberation struggle".

== See also ==
- 2017 Kurdistan Region independence referendum
