= Iraqi Kurdistan independence referendum =

Iraqi Kurdistan independence referendum may refer to:

- 2005 Kurdistan Region independence referendum
- 2017 Kurdistan Region independence referendum
