= Kurdistan Freedom Party =

Political party in the Kurdistan Region of Iraq

- پارتی ئازادیی کوردستان
- Founding leader: Said Yazdanpanah
- Leader: Hussein Yazdanpanah
- Spokesperson: Ardalan Khosrawi
- Dates active: Since 1991; 35 years ago
- Allegiance: Coalition of Political Forces of Iranian Kurdistan (2026–present)
- Headquarters: Erbil, Kurdistan Region, Iraq
- Active regions: Iraqi Kurdistan; Iranian Kurdistan; Syrian Kurdistan (formerly)
- Ideology: Kurdish nationalism Secularism; Separatism; Republicanism; Anti-clericalism
- Size: 1,000 (claimed)
- Website: pazadik.net

Kurdistan Freedom Party (Kurdish: پارتی ئازادیی کوردستان, romanized: Partî Azadîyê Kurdistan, abbreviated as PAK) is a Kurdish nationalist and separatist militant group of Kurds in Iran, based in the Kurdistan Region of Iraq. The group has declared the creation of an independent Kurdish country or a 'Republic of Kurdistan' as its main aim.

== History ==
The group was founded by Said Yazdanpanah, a former member of the People's Fedai Guerrillas, in Ranya, in May 1991, as the Revolutionaries' Union of Kurdistan. Said Yazdanpanah was killed in September 1991, and his brother Hussein Yazdanpanah ('Mam Hussein') took over the organization afterwards.

In a congress held between 10 and 12 October 2006 in Erbil, the group adopted its current name and choose Ali Qazi, the son of Qazi Mohammad, as its leader. Hussein Yazdanpanah became Vice President. A few months later, the group experienced a split when some members led by Simko Yazdanpanah, Hussein's brother, left the party on 7 July 2007. They declared on 12 August that they had reorganized the original Revolutionaries' Union of Kurdistan Party, and named Amine Khanim, the mother of the Yazdanpanah brothers, as their leader. PAK remained under the leadership of Hussein Yazdanpanah, who continues to serve as its leader to this day.

As of 2017, the organization maintains close ties to the Democratic Party of Iranian Kurdistan (KDPI) and is on friendly terms with both Kurdistan Democratic Party (KDP) and Patriotic Union of Kurdistan (PUK).

In 2023 as part of a security agreement between the Iraqi and Iranian governments, PAK, PJAK, KDPI and other Iranian-Kurdish opposition groups were ordered to disarm themselves and relocate their bases away from the border with Iran. PAK has denied that it or any other Iranian-Kurdish parties have laid down their arms or agreed to relocate. However, according to party officials, PAK respects the sovereignty of the Kurdistan Regional Government and, as a result, has refrained from launching attacks on Iran from its territory.

In June 2025, following the Israeli strikes on Iran, leader Hussein Yazdanpanah called on the Kurdish youth in Eastern Kurdistan (Iranian Kurdistan) to attack "Iranian-Regime targets" and to avenge "Kurdistan's martyrs" in particular the death of Jina Amini. According to The National Context, the statement came as part of what it described as PAK's shift toward a high-risk, high-visibility strategy, including openly seeking support from Israel.

During the 2025–2026 Iranian protests, PAK called on other Kurdish forces to urgently coordinate politically and to articulate a unified political position, agreeing on "joint Kurdish measures and practical steps in response to popular demands and realities on the ground." On 22 February 2026, following the protests, PAK joined other Iranian Kurdish parties in creating the Coalition of Political Forces of Iranian Kurdistan. PAK welcomed the 2026 Israeli–United States strikes on Iran but urged Kurds in Iran not to take action immediately, saying they should wait for the right moment rather than act prematurely and risk abandonment by the West, as in previous times.

== Kurdistan National Army (SMK) ==
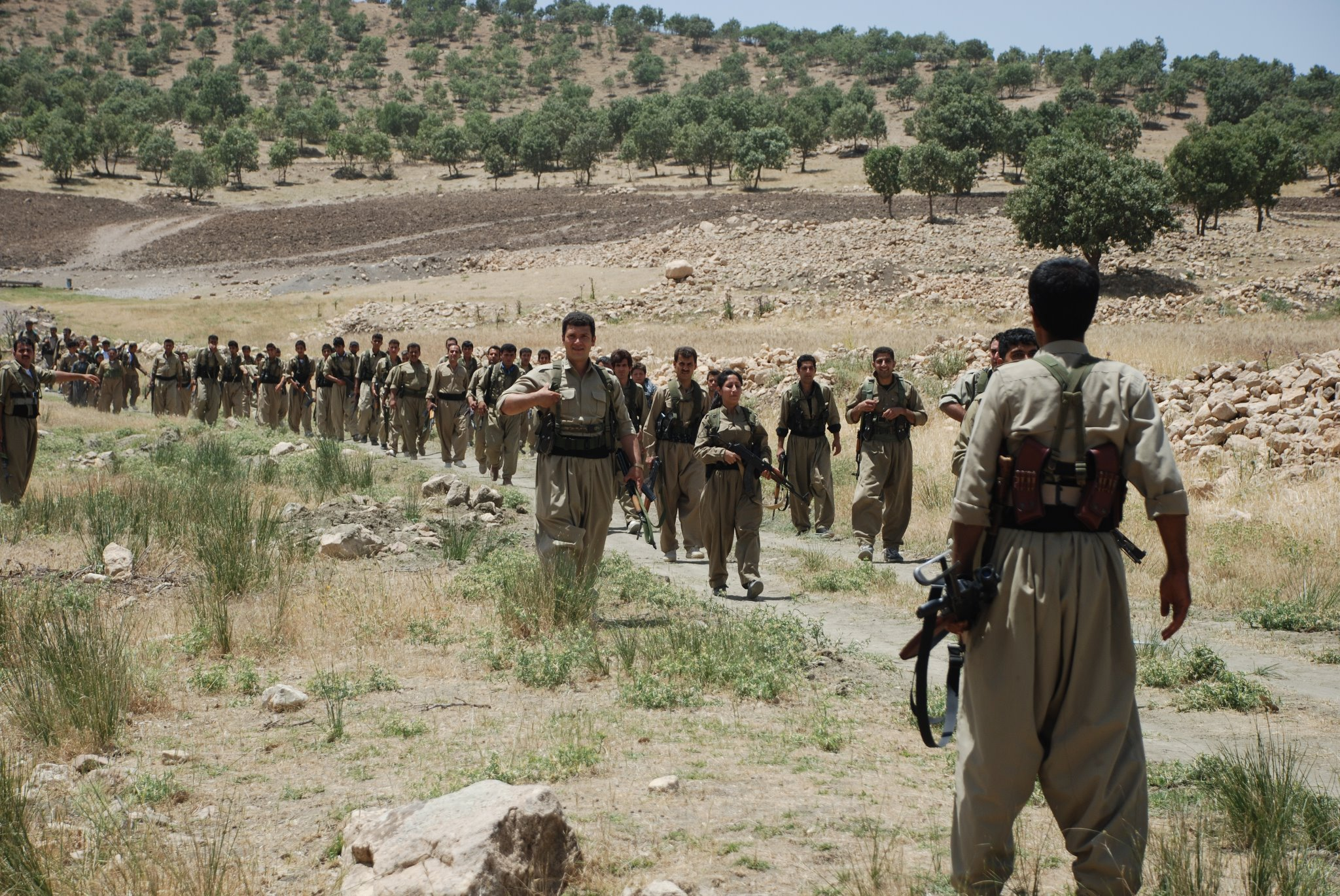
PAK Peshmerga in December 2013

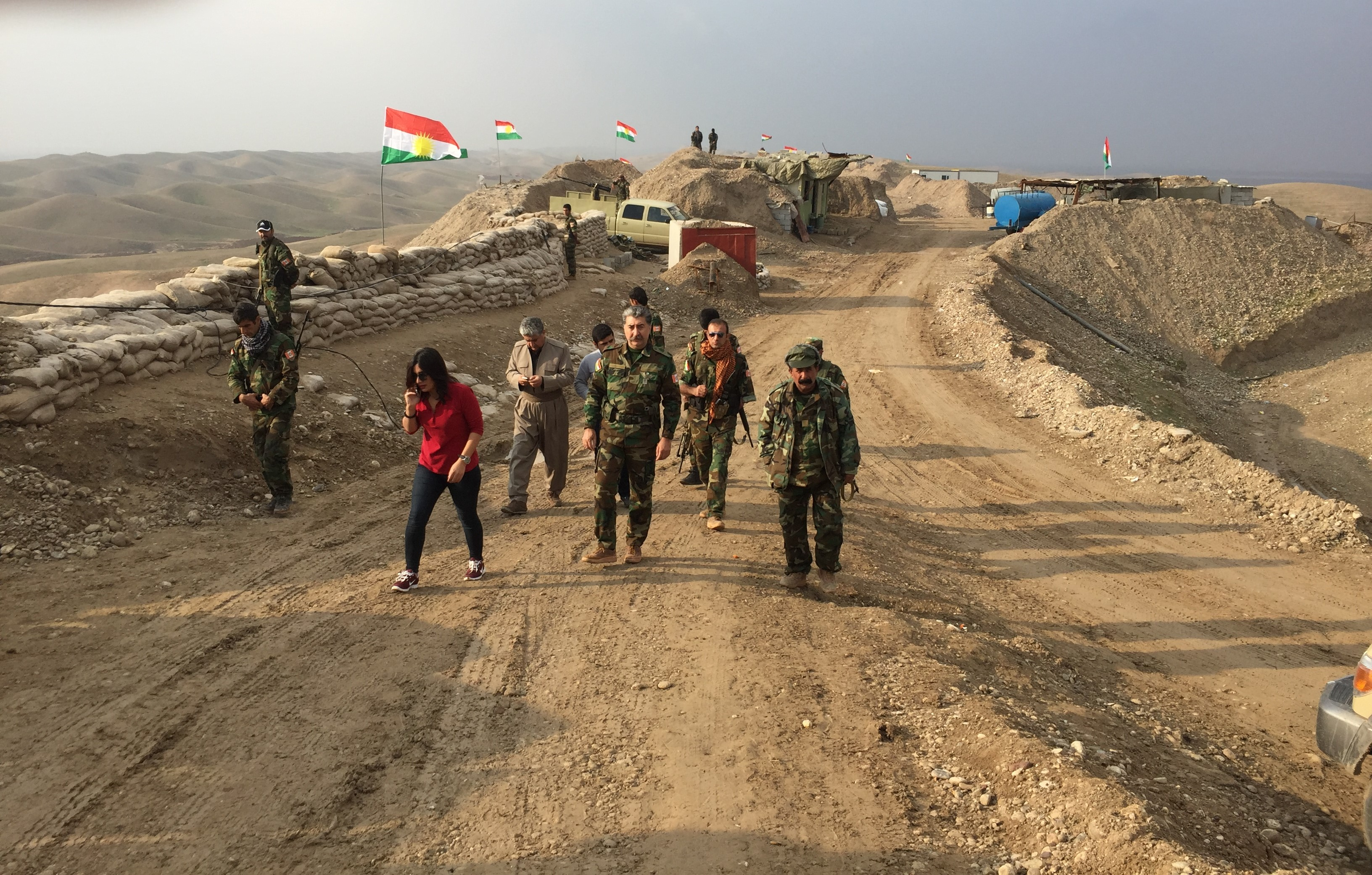
PAK outpost on the frontline with ISIS, Iraqi Kurdistan, December 2015

VOA report from PAK HQ on the ISIS frontline, July 2016

The party does not have a clear separation of military and political structure. The military wing of PAK operates under the name Kurdistan National Army (Kurdish: Sipay Mîllî Kurdistan, SMK), and was previouly also known under the names Kurdistan Freedom Eagles for East Kurdistan (HKR-R) and PAK Eagles. Commonly they're known as "PAK Peshmerga."

The PAK Peshmerga are a battle-hardened force, due to their involvement in the War against the Islamic State (ISIS), in which they extensively cooperated with other Kurdish factions. They were the first Iranian-Kurdish party to offer support to the Kurdistan Region of Iraq. In Iraqi Kurdistan they've fought against ISIS in Kirkuk, where they played a particularly crucial role, Hawija, Bashiqa, Sinjar and other areas. Some fighters may have also been present on the Mosul front. It is believed that some members have travelled to Syria to defend Kobanî back in 2014.

In April 2016, PAK attacked Iranian government security forces in Sanandaj during the annual Islamic Republic of Iran Army Day parade, ending its ceasefire and resuming the armed struggle. Further activities against the IRGC included hit-and-run attacks in the towns of Sardasht, Oshnavieh, Baneh and Sanandaj, in which they inflicated low casualty figures on the Iranian side.

Following the Battle of Kirkuk in 2017 and the subsequent Iraqi attacks near Pirdê (Altun Kupri), PAK forces, together with KDP Peshmerga, teamed up to repel the assault. General Yazdanpanah himself was frequently spotted on the frontlines, while leading his troops into battle. One PAK officer explained to The New Arab that, "We are all Kurdish, from one family of Kurdistan," and therefore help was offered.

In 2019, PAK claimed to have arrested a spy of Iran's Basij units near Pirdê, Kurdistan Region. According to PAK the spy aimed to "cause anxiety, psychological conflicts among PAK Peshmerga, and to weaken their interest in the party. By the end of the mission, he would assassinate important commanders of PAK."

In 2022, PAK, KDPI, PJAK and Komala positions in the Kurdistan Region, close to the border with Iran, were struck by around 70 Iranian ballistic missiles (Fateh-110 claimed by PAK), as well as various rockets and Shahed kamikaze drones. Altogether the attack claimed the lives of 14 fighters and injured another 58. PAK claimed that they suffered "several" casualties, without citing a specific number. The Iranian government justified the attacks, by accusing the party of fueling Iran's nationwide protest movement in 2022.

During the 2025–2026 Iranian protests, the SMK claimed to have carried out a series of attacks against Islamic Revolutionary Guard Corps (IRGC) positions. In one such incident, the group's "Zagros Tornado units" said they injured three IRGC members in Nourabad, Lorestan Province. On 10 January 2026, PAK claimed that its fighters had killed six IRGC members. The actions were not limited to Eastern Kurdistan, as incidents in Isfahan were also reported. Several of these incidents were accompanied by photos and videos released by the group showing gunfire and buildings set ablaze. The Tasnim news agency, which is close to the IRGC, said Kurdish groups including the PAK "have played an active role in [the protests] by issuing coordinated statements and messages" and that they "have entered the field phase."

=== Strength ===
At the start of the War against the Islamic State, the PAK consisted of a single battalion with 50 soldiers, when they were on the Mosul front.

In September 2018, Ardalan Khosrawi, the military spokesperson for PAK, claimed that the party had '850 battle-hardened fighters' from the War against ISIS and a number of operatives in Iran. A year later in December 2019, Hussein Yazdanpanah said there are 1,000 members in his group.

In 2016, Voice of America wrote that the group has some 600 fighters, one-third of whom are female. A 2017 report published by Combating Terrorism Center estimated that the group has "a few hundred" members, the same figure reported by AP in the previous year. Professor Ofra Bengio, head of the Kurdish Studies Program at Tel Aviv University, mentioned in a report for the BESA Center think tank, that the group had 600 fighters in 2017.

PAK welcomed some foreign fighters from Scandinavia during its campaign against ISIL.

According to a report of the Middle East Media Research Institute (MEMRI) in 2023, PAK is the fastest-growing Kurdish party and has among the most effective and prepared armed forces in the region. The Mahsa Amini protests in 2023 led many Kurdish women in Iranian Kurdistan to join PAK. The Saudi-based Al-Arabiya Network reported that 200 women, who previously took part in the protests, were attending training camps of PAK. Similarly, CNN reported that "a number of dissidents" crossed into the Kurdistan Region of Iraq to join the ranks of PAK.

As of 2025, the party claims to maintain sleeper cells inside Iran, although it has operated primarily in the Kurdistan Region of Iraq in recent years.

=== Equipment ===
PAK members wear uniforms similar to the fighters under the command of the KRG's Ministry of Peshmerga Affairs. They differentiate themselves visually from other Kurdish factions by wearing orange scarves and installing their own patches. The fighters use a variety of weapons, including Russian-made equipment. The AK-47, IED's and RPG's are regularly used by PAK fighters. Journalist Fazel Hawramy wrote in 2017 that PAK uses weapons supplied by Combined Joint Task Force – Operation Inherent Resolve.

=== Training ===
In September 2016, PAK announced that it has received military training in weapons and explosives from the United States in their fight against ISIS. Around that same time PAK had also received training from other Western advisors, according to Italian Army Captain Giulio Macari, spokesman for the US-led coalition against ISIS in Erbil.

== Ideology ==
The group espouses Kurdish nationalism and is regarded as politically left-leaning on the political spectrum. By using the word 'Kurdistan' in their name, the group rejects the ideologies and strategies of the Kurdistan Worker's Party (PKK) and Peoples' Democratic Party (HDP), which have shifted their aim toward the democratization of Turkey, and instead grounds its agenda in Kurdish ethnic and national identity – making it not just a pro-Kurdish party, but an explicitly Kurdish one.

PAK advocates the establishment of an independent Kurdistan by all means, including "coercive and military force," and rejects negotiations with Iran. It criticizes Iraq’s federal system, arguing that only full Kurdish sovereignty can ensure protection from the international community.

== State Sponsorship ==
In July 2016, PAK declared that international aid would help them cease "Iranian influence in the region". They directly asked Saudi Arabia for funding, according to a Stratfor analysis, which may have been accepted.

== Flags ==
Official flag of the Kurdistan Freedom Party.

The Ala Rengîn which is also used by the group.

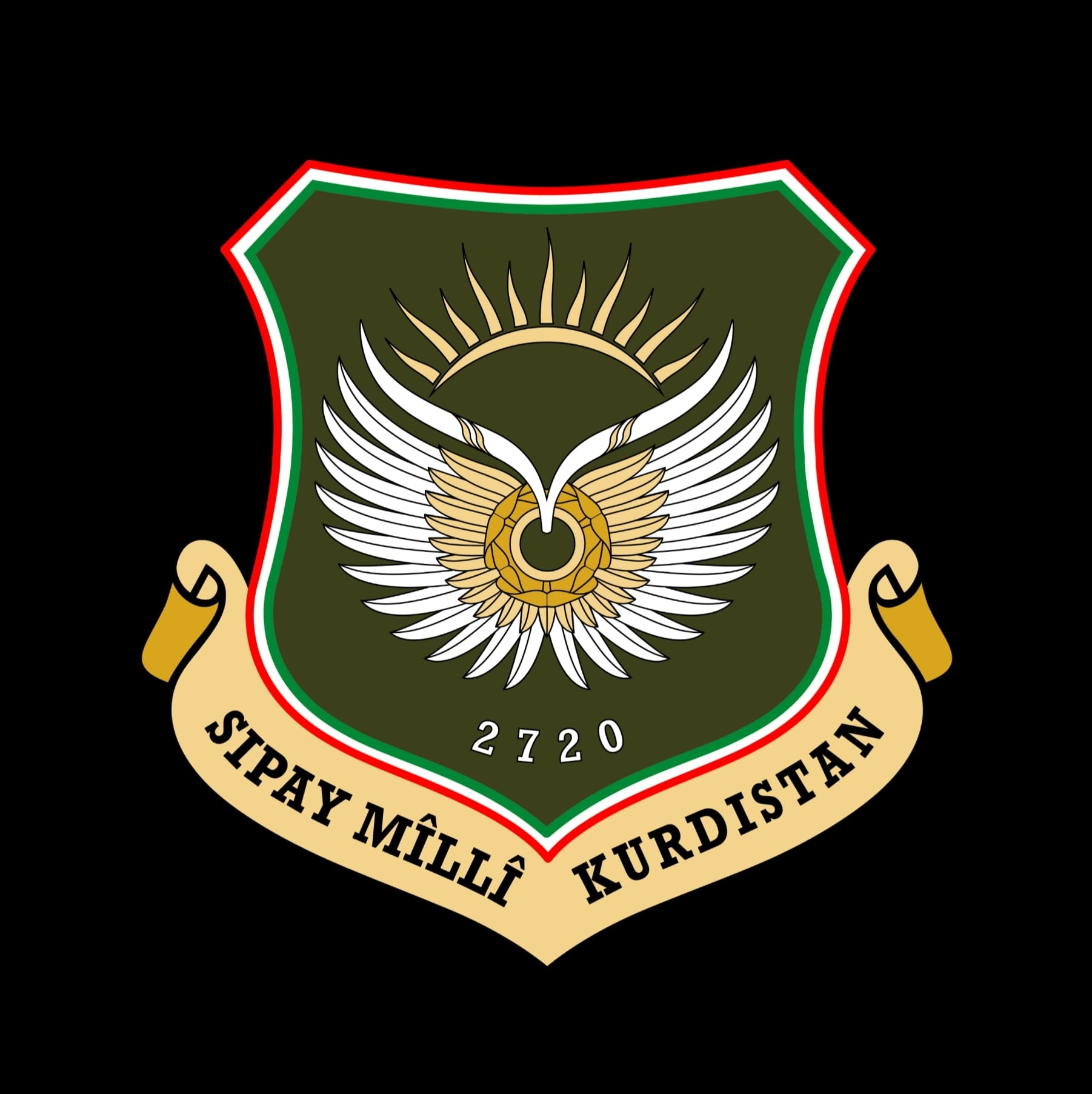
Insignia of the party's armed wing, the National Army of Kurdistan (SMK).

== See also ==
- Democratic Party of Iranian Kurdistan
- Kurdistan Free Life Party
