= Hussein Yazdanpanah =

Commander-in-Chief of the Kurdistan Freedom Party

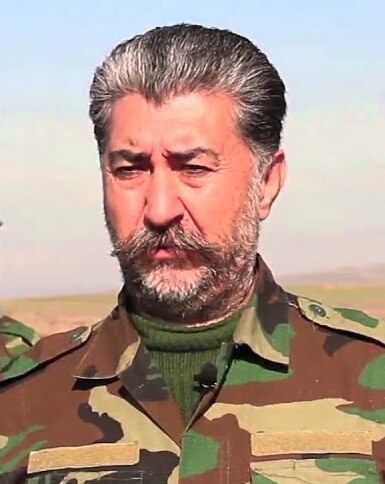
- Born: April 30, 1966 (age 60); Saqqezlu, Iran
- Military career
- Allegiance: Kurdistan Freedom Party
- Rank: General Commander
- Nicknames: Kurdish Stalin; Mam Hussein
- Commands: National Army of Kurdistan (SMK) (1991-present)
- Conflicts: War against the Islamic State; Liberation of Sinjar; Battle of Altun Kupri (2017); Western Iran clashes (2016); Iraqi–Kurdish conflict (2017)

Hussein Yazdanpanah (also known as Mam Hussein; born April 30, 1966) is a Kurdish military leader, serving as the commander-in-chief of the Kurdistan Freedom Party (PAK).

== Early life ==
Yazdanpanah was born in the village of Saqqezlu, near the town of Bukan. He comes from a long lineage of fighters for the freedom of Kurds and their right for self-determination. In 1881, Yazdanpanah's grandfather Fayzulla Bayg led a thousand Kurdish fighters against the Qajar Dynasty.

During his teenage years, Yazdanpanah engaged in political activities amid the Iranian Revolution, which led to his arrest by the new Iranian regime on two occasions. The bloody crackdown on Kurdish opposition led his family to flee into the Zagros Mountains. Following the death of his brother Rashid, Yazdanpanah aspired to join the Peshmerga and fight against the Iranians. In Ranya, Iraqi Kurdistan his other brother, Said Yazdanpanah, founded the Revolutionaries' Union of Kurdistan.

== Kurdistan Freedom Party (PAK) ==
A few months after its foundation in 1991, Hussein Yazdanpanah took over the Revolutionaries' Union of Kurdistan after his brother, Said, was killed in an assassination. Hussein has remained at the helm of the organization ever since and renamed it the Kurdistan Freedom Party (PAK) in 2006.

Yazdanpanah involved his party in various conflicts to defend Kurdish interests and rights, including the War against the Islamic State and the Iraqi-Kurdish conflict of 2017. Although Yazdanpanah holds the rank of General, he adopts an unconventional approach by actively fighting alongside his soldiers on the frontlines rather than remaining behind the command lines. As a result, he has been described as a 'frontline general'. Yazdanpanah played a significant role in the Liberation of Sinjar from ISIS.

== Political positions ==
Yazdanpanah strives for an independent 'Greater Kurdistan' and not merely autonomy. He is also vocal in his critique of the disunity among Kurdish parties, saying, “The tragedy is that throughout history we have been divided among ourselves".

== Joseph Stalin lookalike ==
He has been compared to Joseph Stalin, giving him the nickname “Kurdish Stalin”. Russian internet users particularly have taken an interest in Yazdanpanah due to this. A Russian meme spread online that with a commander that looks like this the Kurds will not only conquer Mosul, but also Berlin.
