= 2017 Iraqi–Kurdish conflict =

Armed conflict between Iraqi forces and Peshmerga

- Part of the Iraqi–Kurdish conflict during the War in Iraq (2013–2017)
- Map of the offensive
Date	15 October 2017 – 27 October 2017 (1 week and 5 days)
Location	Northern Iraq
Result	Iraqi victory; Kurdistan Region independence referendum annulled by force; Iraqi government re-establishes control over northern borders, airports and banks in Kurdistan Region
Territorial changes	Iraqi government forces defeat the Peshmerga and capture 40% of the territory controlled by the Kurdistan Region including the province of Kirkuk, along with its oil fields and checkpoints, Khanaqin and Jalawla in Diyala province, as well as Makhmur, Bashiqa and Sinjar in Nineveh province.

Belligerents
Iraq	(Kurdistan Region) Kurdistan Regional Government PKK; PDKI; PAK White Flags (alleged)

Commanders and leaders
(Iraq) Haider al-Abadi (Iraq) Othman al-Ghanmi (Iraq) Juma Inad (Iraq) Ma’an al-Saedi; Abu Mahdi al-Muhandis; Yılmaz Neccar	(Kurdistan Region) Masoud Barzani (until 1 Nov.) (Kurdistan Region) Kosrat Rasul Ali (until 1 Nov.) (Kurdistan Region) Nechirvan Barzani (Kurdistan Region) Masrour Barzani (Kurdistan Region) Najmiddin Karim (Kurdistan Region) Azad Muhammad; Hussein Yazdanpanah

Units involved
(Iraq) Iraqi Army; ISOF; 9th Armored Division; Popular Mobilization Forces; Turkmen Brigades; ITF (protection of headquarters in Kirkuk)	(Kurdistan Region) Peshmerga; (Kurdistan Democratic Party) KDP Peshmerga; Zeravani; Rojava Peshmerga; HPG; PDKI Peshmerga; PAK Peshmerga

Strength
3,000+ government fighters and PMU forces; 300 armored vehicles	9,000+ Peshmerga forces

Casualties and losses
7 dead (per Kirkuk hospital); 210 killed; 1 tank destroyed (Kurdish claim)	180 killed 200 wounded 45 captured (PUK claim)
- 400 Kurdish civilians killed, 200 missing in Kirkuk (per Kurdish media); 183,000 displaced (per United Nations)

The 2017 Iraqi–Kurdish conflict, also known as the Kirkuk crisis, was a conflict in which the Iraqi government retook disputed territories in Iraq which had been held by the Peshmerga since ISIL's Northern Iraq offensive in 2014. The conflict began on 15 October 2017 after tensions arising from the Kurdistan Region independence referendum of 25 September. The tension between the federal Iraqi government and Kurdistan Region escalated into conflict when the Peshmerga ignored repeated warnings to return Kirkuk to Iraqi government forces. Part of the conflict was the Battle of Kirkuk, when Iraqi forces routed Peshmerga forces from the city in a surprise dawn-offensive, marking the beginning of clashes. The Iraqi forces ultimately defeated the Kurds, recaptured large swaths of territory previously controlled by them, displaced them and annulled the referendum by force.

The conflict began in response to a referendum vote on independence held by the Kurdistan Regional Government to break away from Iraq despite the Federal Court deeming the vote unconstitutional. The designated break away areas included territories disputed between the Iraqi central government and the Kurdistan Regional Government. The disputed territories had been under the control of government forces prior to ISIL's Northern Iraq offensive during which they switched into the hands of the Kurdistan Regional Government.

The central government demanded the return of the areas to central administration following the end of the war, however this was rejected by the Kurdistan Regional Government. Chief among these areas were the oil rich regions of Kirkuk and Sinjar as well as the areas of Tuz Khurmatu, Makhmur and Jalawla. The vote was heavily opposed by non-Kurdish residents of the territories who had been accusing the Kurdistan Regional Government for years of discriminatory treatment and forced Kurdification of their areas including demolition of entire settlements, gerry-mandering and vote-rigging.

As a result of the conflict, Kurdistan Region lost 40% of the land mass it had administered prior to the conflict and was forced to cancel the results of the referendum.

== Background ==
The President of the Iraqi Kurdistan Region, Masoud Barzani, facilitated the Iraqi Kurdistan independence referendum in September 2017. This led the Prime Minister of Iraq Haider al-Abadi to demand that the referendum result be cancelled and called on the KRG to initiate dialogue in the framework of the constitution. The Kurdistan Regional Government rejected these offers despite intense pressure from neighbouring countries and the international community, culminating in an air embargo on the region.

The announcement of the referendum was taken negatively within the halls of the Iraqi government. Within the region it was the product of long held dreams of Kurdish independence beginning in the twentieth century as well as local politics within the region. The ruling KDP party, looking to ward off threat to its authority from rival PUK and Gorran parties saw the election as a way to consolidate its power and place its rivals in a difficult position in the backdrop of the upcoming elections. This tense background created disharmony in the rank of the Kurdish leadership which contributed to the defeat of Peshmerga forces in the conflict.

The initial assault came as a surprise given the repeated assurances by the Prime Minister of Iraq, Haider Al Abadi, that there would be no offensive against the region despite the build of Iraqi troops on its borders. This however, turned out to be false. The assault came in the early hours of 16 October 2017 when the central government forces launched a lightning offensive on the Peshmerga forces on the borders of the city and inside the K9 air base. However, as the battle went on, Kurdish defences began to collapse as the offensive gathered momentum.

Disorganised Peshmerga lines to the south of the city crumbled as they were engaged by Iraqi tanks and a full retreat ensued. By mid-day the KRG appointed mayor of Kirkuk Najmiddin Karim had fled the city and Iraqi counter terrorism forces were seen patrolling the streets having secured the office of the mayoralty and K9 air base. Chaos erupted among the ranks of the Peshmerga as news of the defeat sent shock waves through the region, mutual allegations of betrayal were made among leaders of the PUK and KDP. After the victory in Kirkuk, Iraqi central government forces launched frontal assaults, pincer movements and flanking manoeuvres advancing east towards Tuz Khurmatu and Jalawla and north towards Makhmur and the Mosul dam.

By the end of the conflict, the central government had captured a fifth of the land mass previously administered by the region and was in full control of the disputed territories. The offensive was considered a disastrous defeat in the Kurdish region and sent the price of oil internationally into a sharp spike, however these shortly stabilised as a result of the quick victory of the Iraqi forces.

== Iraqi advances and clashes ==
The Kurdish Peshmerga ignored a deadline given by the Iraqi Government to withdraw from disputed areas by 15 October 2017. This led to Iraqi central government forces retaking Kirkuk and its province the next day. Within 15 hours, the city of Kirkuk and the nearby K-1 Air Base, along with surrounding oilfields, were retaken by Iraqi forces in a lightning offensive. This, in turn, led to the collapse of Kurdish defenses. The sudden loss of Kirkuk having been the centre of dispute between the central government and the Kurdistan Regional Government came as a shock in the region, disorganising Kurdish defences and throwing Kurdish leadership into disharmony. Mutual accusations of betrayal were made amids international calls for restraint and an end to the fighting.

On 17 October 2017, The Iraqi advance continued, with further gains including Khanaqin near the Iranian border, as well as Jalawla, Bashiqa, and Sinjar towards Syria.

A statement from the Iraqi military on 18 October 2017, confirmed that the Mosul dam and other previously Kurdish-held territories in Nineveh province had been taken from the Peshmerga. Ali Akbar Khafaji, an Iraqi police officer, claimed eight PMU fighters and one Peshmerga fighter were killed in clashes that broke out after the PMU failed to heed the Peshmerga's warnings to not advance on the Mosul dam.

By 19 October 2017, according to Erbil's governor, 100,000 ethnic Kurds had fled the city of Kirkuk and Tuz Khurmatu following the victory by Iraqi forces, with 18,000 Kurds taking shelter in Erbil and Sulaimaniyah. The next day, Hemin Hawrami, a senior assistant to KRG President Masoud Barzani, said in a post on Twitter that 57,000 families from Kirkuk were in need of "immediate assistance" after arriving in various parts of Iraqi Kurdistan and taking shelter in unfinished housing units, having fled from "violence, looting and crimes" perpetrated by the Iranian-trained and largely Shi'ite Popular Mobilization Forces. Kirkuk police called on the media not to publish rumors. The United Nations released a statement saying it was concerned about reports of violence and the forced displacement of Kurdish civilians, and called for the perpetrators to be brought to justice. It was further reported that UN relief offices received reports that in the town of Tuz Khurmatu, 150 houses were burned and 11 houses were blown up. The UN noted PM Haider al-Abadi's acknowledgement of incidents in Tuz Khurmatu, caused by what he described as extremist elements from both sides and his decision to send the Iraqi army to restore order in Tuz Khurmatu, as well as the requests of the political and security leaderships of the country for federal and local security forces to act in full respect for law and order and protect civilians and political leaders. The PM accused social media instigators of posting fake videos of the alleged violations. The Niqash website confirmed this increase of false news, as well as hundreds of fake videos & pictures. Leaders on both sides say this is leading to a dangerous escalation of tensions in northern Iraq.

On 19 October 2017, one person was killed and three wounded in a protest against Iraqi forces in Khanaqin. A group of about 150 to 200 unarmed youth carrying Kurdistan flags were protesting, demanding that Iraqi forces leave the city, Col. Azad Isa, Khanaqin's police chief, told Rudaw Kurdish Network. The demonstration was small but energetic, ending with some dancing before they all left. Many said they just wanted the local police to have a presence in town and were not concerned with the larger political struggle over Kurdish independence.

In the early hours of 20 October 2017, a battle took place in the predominantly Turkmen town of Altun Kupri as Iraqi forces moved towards it. Iraq's Joint Operations Command stated that Peshmerga had used MILAN missiles in the battle, which led to Iraqi criticism as the missiles were given by Germany to the Peshmerga in order to be used against IS. The Peshmerga denied they had used the missiles. Earlier, Germany had said it would temporarily stop training Kurdish Peshmerga forces. However, training began again after a week's interruption. Kurdish sources also claimed that 150 PMU fighters were killed or wounded. This was considered to be the first significant battle in which the Peshmerga put up a heavy resistance, (due to the fact that Kurdistan Region considers Altun Kupri as part of Erbil Governorate) whereas in other disputed areas they withdrew after the arrival of Iraqi forces. The Iraqi forces pushed Peshmerga out and captured Altun Kupri by 10 a.m. the same day.

By the end of 20 October, Iraqi forces had seized complete control of Kirkuk province. Iraqi Joint Operations Command (JOC) meanwhile denied that Hashd al-Shaabi (PMU) fighters were present among the troops that advanced on Altun Kupri, claiming the troops were Counter-Terrorism Service (CTS) forces. It added that two soldiers were killed and five others wounded in the clashes that erupted when they captured the town.

At the time Kurds expressed concern of an imminent incursion into Erbil, but the then-prime minister of Iraq, Haider al-Abadi reiterated that his forces would stop at what he called the "2003 line". Ultimately, the conflict ended after the Iraqi forces were not ordered to advance further into additional Kurdish-held territory, but had they done it, the Kurds would not have been able to withstand Iraqi firepower.

== Subsequent events ==
On 24 October 2017, Peshmerga KDP forces were told that the checkpoint in Makhmur would be handed over as per agreements between the Iraqi government and the Kurdish Regional government. However, upon arrival at the checkpoint, the Peshmerga surrounded the Iraqi troops. Twenty Iraqi soldiers were arrested, two killed, and eight more were wounded by the Peshmerga. The PUK accused the Peshmerga KDP of mistreating those who had been arrested by them, and all Iraqi soldiers were released after the Peshmerga command intervened against a local Peshmerga garrison acting against orders.

On 25 October 2017, Iraqi forces seized the Rabia border crossing with Syria after the withdrawal of Syrian Kurdish forces. On the same day, the KRG made a statement offering to freeze the results of the referendum as part of an offer to defuse the crisis. The statement also called for a ceasefire and a halt to all military operations in the northern region. Iraqi Prime Minister Haider al-Abadi rejected the proposal, adding that the Iraqi central government "will accept only the canceling of the referendum and following the constitution."

On 26 October 2017 at 06:00 hrs, Iraqi federal police and Popular Mobilization Forces (PMF) began a four-pronged assault on Peshmerga positions in Zummar; from Bardiya and Hamad Agha towards Ain Ouais, from Mosharaf towards Sufaya, and from Rabia towards Mahmoudiya. The Kurdistan Security Council claimed that Peshmerga had destroyed three tanks, five US-supplied Humvees and one Badger and repelled the attempts of the Iraqi forces to retake Faysh Khabur. However, Iraqi and PMU forces managed to retake two villages, Jazronia & Mahmoudiya, as they attempted to advance towards the town of Faysh Khabur, near the Iraqi-Syrian-Turkish border triangle. Some reports meanwhile indicated that Masoud Barzani might announce that he would step down as president of the KRG.

On 27 October, the Kurdish Regional Government stated that Iraqi forces and Kurdish Peshmerga fighters had agreed to stop fighting in northern Iraq, although the status of any ceasefire remained unclear. A CJTF-OIR spokesman earlier said the deal covered all fronts of conflict. However, he later denied that truce had been officially agreed. The coalition's spokesman, Col. Ryan Dillon, denied that a ceasefire had been reached, retreating from his earlier announcement of a ceasefire between both sides, tweeting, "I incorrectly said in an interview with (Kurdish TV) Rudaw English that there was a cease-fire between Iraqi and Kurdish forces." Iraqi PM al-Abadi later ordered a 24-hour truce to allow a peaceful deployment of Iraqi troops at border crossings with the Kurdistan region.

On 31 October, the Iraqi army took control of the Faysh Khabur border crossing.

On 29 November, after claims of ethnic cleansing and the destruction of Kurdish homes, shops and businesses in Tuz Khurmatu and claims of discrimination and oppression against the Kurdish residents of the city by the PMU, the 'Kurdistan Liberation Army' was formed composing of 200 Kurdish volunteers in Tuz Khurmatu. Clashes occurred, in which 8 PMU fighters were killed, and one Kurdish volunteer wounded. Kurdistan24 posted footage of the fighting and unverified graphic videos showed dead bodies of the Turkmen PMU stationed in Tuz Khurmatu. There had been clashes in Kirkuk between volunteers nearly every day in the previous month between Kurdish volunteers and PMU.

On 6 December a policeman, Major Samer Abdel Nabi Jassam, was killed in a drive-by shooting in Kirkuk, presumably by DRK. A day later, heavy fighting erupted in Kirkuk in which the DRK targeted an Iraqi Counter-Terrorism HQ with heavy weapons, RPGs, grenades and rifle fire; the battle lasting an hour. Afrasiaw Kamil Waisi, Kirkuk police spokesperson stated that there was no casualties, however other Kurdish sources claimed many Iraqi troops were killed and wounded.

On 12 December Iraqi helicopters bombed Dawouda and Zinana areas (Kurdish areas) for the first time since 1991 causing many Kurdish families to be displaced. This led to DRK retaliatory mortar fire against PMU forces inside Tuz Khurmatu causing many casualties amongst the PMU forces.

On 16 December a heavy firefight occurred after Kurdish volunteers inside Kirkuk used at least five RPGs and heavy weapons against two different Turkmen offices. Turkmen sources claim there were no casualties.

A day later, on 18 December, some Kurds in Kirkuk flew the Kurdish flag in schools and universities in Kirkuk and wore Kurdish clothes to celebrate the official Kurdistan Flag Day, leading to PMF forces arresting a number of young people involved.

Kurdish sources have complained of a perceived Arabisation campaign undertaken by the Iraqi government in critical places such as Kirkuk, Tuz Khurmatu and Khanaqin, and warned of a possible demographic change. In June 2024, Kurdistan24 claimed that the level of Arabisation in Kirkuk is unprecedented and that the current level of Arabisation surpasses in size the one that was reached by the previous Ba'athist regime, claiming that over 100 000 families had hitherto relocated to Kirkuk from other parts of Iraq. Karwan Kamarkhan, a Kurdish official stated: “after October 16, 2017, the Arabization campaign in Kirkuk has continued, involving the transfer of civil status ID cards and ration cards from other Iraqi provinces to Kirkuk. Residency cards are being issued to these new [Arab] settlers for a very small amount of money, reflecting the severity of the Arabization process.”

== Dialogue ==
Iraqi and Peshmerga commanders held talks in Mosul on 28 October attempting to resolve the crisis over the disputed areas. Amidst the crisis, KRG President Masoud Barzani announced on 29 October that he would not be asking parliament to renew his presidency when it expired on 1 November, transferring his presidential powers to the institutions of the KRG which include the legislature and judiciary. Iraqi state TV meanwhile said that the second round of talks between both sides had started the same day.

On 31 October, Prime Minister Haider al-Abadi announced that Iraq had regained control of all disputed areas. At a press conference, al-Abadi also accused certain KRG-linked media outlets of "openly inciting violence against federal forces". Abadi announced that the government planned to start paying the salaries of Peshmerga and civil servants working for KRG, stating, "We will soon be able to pay all the salaries of the Peshmerga and the employees of the region."

Anadolu News Agency meanwhile reported that Turkish and Iraqi forces had moved towards the Ibrahim Khalil border crossing that morning. The Prime Minister of Turkey Binali Yıldırım told members of his Justice and Development Party in parliament that the border gate had been "handed over to the central government". An Iraqi border police captain showed images of the Iraqi flag flying at the crossing, saying that it was "officially under the full control of the Iraqi government." An Iraqi military statement however confirmed that only a delegation led by the chief-of-staff Othman al-Ghanmi had visited Ibrahim Khalil and Faysh Khabur to determine military and security requirements for taking control. Iraqi troops were however deployed at the border crossing with Iraqi positions set up between Turkish and Iraqi Kurdish checkpoints, according to a security source in Baghdad. KRG officials meanwhile stated they had not relinquished control of the crossing, with Hoshyar Zebari stating that discussions were needed to allow Iraqi oversight at the border.

On 1 November, the Iraqi Joint Operations Command accused the Kurdish military of reneging on the draft agreement for the federal military to redeploy federal forces in disputed areas and border crossing points. It also accused them of moving their forces and building new defensive lines during the negotiation period to deter the redeployment of the federal Iraqi forces. The JOC threatened to resume military operations to capture Kurdish-held territory.

The KRG on 2 November offered a joint deployment at Faysh Khabur, which its defense department stated was part of a "deconfliction" proposal on 31 October, including a ceasefire on all fronts, continued cooperation in fight against IS and joint deployment in disputed areas. The KRG on the same day also accused the central Iraqi government of being "not interested" in joint deployment at the border with Turkey.

Prime Minister of Iraqi Kurdistan Nechirvan Barzani stated on 6 November that the KRG would hand over the oil revenue in exchange for the central government agreeing to pay the customary 17% share of the federal budget. The Supreme Federal Court ruled on the same day that no region or province could secede. KRG stated on 14 November that it will accept the court's ruling.

Haider al-Abadi stated on 14 November that he would act soon over border areas under Kurdish control, but predicted Iraqi forces would regain them without violence. "We will regain control on border areas without escalation. But our patience will run out. We will not wait forever. We will take action." The Iraqi Supreme Court ruled the referendum as unconstitutional and its results void on 20 November. Nechirvan Barzani meanwhile blamed the court of reaching the decision unilaterally without any KRG input and asked for a third party to mediate in negotiations between central government and the KRG.

The central government later listed 13 preconditions for dialogue including, a handwritten note of annulment of the referendum, which the federal court ruled illegal and KRG respected the ruling but didn't formally renounce it. It also asked for guarantee of not seeking independence, handing over all border crossings and airports as well as all future federal revenues. KRG agreed to the conditions and Abadi announced that talks will be resumed. An MP of Abadi's ruling bloc stated on 4 January 2018 that a parliamentary committee would be set up to resolve all disputes. Meanwhile, a delegation of Kurdish parties met Abadi according to a statement by his office.

Abadi announced on 13 March that the airports of the region will be reopened to international flights, with flights possibly resuming in a week. The statement added that Kurdish authorities had agreed for the two airports in Erbil and Sulaimaniyah with international flights to come under federal control. Kurdish authorities confirmed that airports will come under federal control and would report to the central Interior Ministry. The federal government announced on 19 March that it had paid salaries to employees in the region for the first time since 2014.

== Reactions ==
=== International ===
- Turkey: In a statement on 16 October 2017, the Ministry of Foreign Affairs said that it supported Iraq's move to "...restore peace and stability in the country, including Kirkuk...", and warned the KRG that it will be held responsible for allowing PKK to penetrate the city. It added that Turkey was closely monitoring Iraq's steps to "restore its constitutional sovereignty over Kirkuk, a homeland for Turkmens for centuries, after the illegitimate referendum conducted by the KRG." Deputy Prime Minister Bekir Bozdağ held KRG President Barzani responsible for regional disputes stating, "Barzani should own up to his mistakes. Only saying ‘I've frozen the referendum’ is not enough [...], the cancellation of the referendum is needed."
- United States: President Donald Trump expressed disappointment that the two sides were fighting while stating that the United States was not taking sides. The Pentagon urged Iraqi and Kurdish forces to avoid "additional escalatory actions" after a skirmish over the city of Kirkuk. It described the Iraqi advance into Kirkuk as a "coordinated movement, not attacks". The State Department urged the Iraqi government to avoid clashes by limiting movement of federal troops to those coordinated with the KRG. It also added, "The reassertion of federal authority over disputed areas in no way changes their status – they remain disputed until their status is resolved in accordance with the Iraqi constitution." Secretary of State Rex Tillerson called on both parties to resolve the conflict through dialogue.
- Iran: Supreme Leader Ayatollah Ali Khamenei supported Iraqi PM Haider al-Abadi amidst Iraq's clashes with the Kurds. Office of the Supreme Leader of Iran issued a statement that Khamenei "gave his support for measures taken by the Iraqi government to defend the unity, sovereignty and territorial integrity of Iraq."
- Germany: Foreign Minister Sigmar Gabriel called on all parties to immediately halt the military actions and engage in direct dialogue. Defense Minister Ursula von der Leyen announced that Germany will suspend its mission to train Peshmerga because of the conflict. On 20 October, a spokesman for the defense ministry said that the mission will be resumed if the clashes don't worsen. The training mission was restarted later. The Defense Ministry spokesman said on 23 October that Germany will ensure that weapons supplied by it will only be used against IS.
- France: Élysée Palace released a statement saying, "The president of the Republic asked for everything possible to be done to avoid conflict between Iraqis and that, within the limits of the unity of Iraq and its constitution, a dialogue taking account of the rights of the Kurds and the minorities should be held between Erbil [the Iraqi Kurdish capital] and Baghdad." President Emmanuel Macron welcomed establishment of a committee to discuss joint deployment of both sides in disputed areas.
- Israel: According to Israeli officials, Prime Minister Benjamin Netanyahu was lobbying world powers to prevent further setbacks to Iraqi Kurds as they lose ground to Baghdad's army. Israel is the only major power that has endorsed statehood for the Kurdish people.
- Canada: The Canadian military suspended its support to Iraqi forces and Peshmerga amid the clashes, in which it was later resumed.

=== Domestic ===
- (Kurdistan Region) Iraqi Kurdistan:
  - Opposition parties have demanded the dissolution of Barzani's administration.
  - According to Nechirvan Barzani, the rival Talabani political family committed "a great and historic treason against Kurdistan".
  - President Barzani on 29 October blamed the central government in Baghdad for the crisis, while addressing the Kurdistan region in the first televised speech since the independence referendum stating, "They (Baghdad) used the referendum as an excuse. Their bad intentions were very clear from a long time ago."
  - Rival Kurdish factions accused each other of betraying Kirkuk to Iraqi forces.
  - KRG Vice President Kosrat Rasul Ali called the Iraqi forces in Kirkuk and other areas "invaders"; for this, Iraq's Supreme Court Justice Council ordered his arrest.
- Iraq:
  - In a statement, the Iraqi government accused Kurdish authorities of bringing fighters from Turkey's outlawed Kurdistan Workers Party (PKK) to the disputed province of Kirkuk, in a move it called a "declaration of war".
  - Combined Joint Task Force – Operation Inherent Resolve (CJTF – OIR): In a statement on 16 October, the coalition announced that Coalition forces and advisors are not supporting Government of Iraq or Kurdistan Regional Government activities near Kirkuk and strongly urged all sides to avoid escalatory actions.

== See also ==
- 2026 northeastern Syria offensive
