= History of the Peshmerga =

The Peshmerga have historically been Kurdish guerrilla forces combating the ruling powers in the region of what is now Iraqi Kurdistan. The term "Peshmerga" refers to those who face death, and the forces have long been an essential element in the Kurdish fight for autonomy and recognition.

Under Mahmud Barzanji, the Peshmerga fought against the British Empire following World War I. During this period, Barzanji led several uprisings against British control and sought to establish an independent Kurdish state. The Mahmud Barzanji revolts of 1919–1924, primarily in the Dohuk and Sulaymaniyah regions, marked a critical point in the early history of the Peshmerga.

The Peshmerga also spearheaded revolts against the Iraqi government in 1931–1932 and against Iran in 1946–1947. In Iraq, they resisted government policies that marginalized the Kurdish people, and in Iran, they sought support for Kurdish autonomy during a brief period of Kurdish governance in the region.

Under the leadership of Mustafa Barzani, Peshmerga forces played a significant role in the First Iraqi–Kurdish War (1961–1970) and the Second Iraqi–Kurdish War (1974–1975). These wars were marked by intense conflict with the Iraqi government, which was determined to maintain control over the Kurdish-majority regions.

The Peshmerga also supported Iran during the Iran–Iraq War (1980–1988), as the Kurdish forces aligned with Iran against the Ba'athist Iraq under Saddam Hussein.

The Peshmerga became divided between forces loyal to the Kurdistan Democratic Party (KDP) and those loyal to the Patriotic Union of Kurdistan (PUK), which led to the Iraqi Kurdish Civil War of 1995–1998.

After the 2003 invasion of Iraq, the Peshmerga became the official military forces of the Kurdistan Region, ruled by a KDP-PUK coalition.

The Peshmerga played an important role in retaking territory from the Islamic State of Iraq and the Levant (ISIS) during the War in Iraq (2013–2017).

== Shaykh Mahmud Barzanji revolt (1919–1923) ==
Shaykh Mahmud Barzanji, the first leader of the Peshmerga

Tribal fighters from both Iran and Iraq quickly allied themselves with Shaykh Mahmud as he became more successful in opposing British rule. According to McDowall, the Shaykh's forces "were largely Barzinja tenantry and tribesmen, the Hamavand under Karim Fattah Beg, and disaffected sections of the Jaf, Jabbari, Shaykh Bizayni and Shuan tribes". The popularity and numbers of Shaykh Mahmud's troops only increased after their ambush of a British military column.

Among Mahmud's many supporters and troop leaders was 16-year-old Mustafa Barzani, the future leader of the Kurdish nationalist cause and commander of Peshmerga forces in Kurdish Iraq. Barzani and his men, following the orders of Barzani tribal shakyh Ahmed Barzani, traversed the Piyaw Valley on their way to join Shaykh Mahmud Barzanji. Despite being ambushed numerous times along the way, Barzani and his men reached Shaykh Mahmud's location, albeit too late to aid in the revolt.

The Barzani fighters were only a part of the Shaykh's 500-person force. As the British became aware of the shaykh's growing political and military power, they were forced to respond militarily. Two British brigades were deployed to defeat Shaykh Mahmud's fighters at Darbandi Bazyan near Sulaymaniyah in June 1919. Shaykh Mahmud was eventually arrested and exiled to India in 1921.

At the root of the rebellion, Shaykh Mahmud's leadership appealed to both Kurdish nationalist and religious feelings. Although he knew he could not directly defeat the British, Shaykh Mahmud hoped to seek recognition of Kurdish nationalism by advocating a 'free united Kurdistan'. Using his authority as a religious leader, Shaykh Mahmud called for a jihad against the British in 1919 and thus acquired the support of many Kurds indifferent to the nationalist struggle. Although the intensity of their struggle was motivated by religion, Kurdish peasantry seized the idea of "national and political liberty for all" and strove for "an improvement in their social standing".

Despite opposition by other regional tribes, possibly fearful of the shaykh's growing power, Shaykh Mahmud's fighters continued to oppose British rule after the shaykh's arrest. Although no longer organized under one leader, this intertribal force was "actively anti-British", engaging in hit-and-run attacks, killing British military officers, and participating in another – left the Turkish ranks to join the Kurdish army.

In response to the rebellion, the Turkish government, realizing the strength of Azadi, quickly arrested many of the organization's leaders. In creating a battle plan, Said and the other prominent remaining Azadi leadership established five major fronts to be commanded by regional shaykhs. These shaykh leaders were assisted by former Hamidiye cavalry officers who provided military structure to the rebellion. After organization, unit responsibility was divided among nine areas. The overall headquarters of Said's military force was located in Egri Dagh and protected by a force of 2,000 men. During the onset of the revolt, Said's fighters, facing nearly 25,000 Turkish troops, gained control of a vilayet near Diyarbakır. Besides seizing Turkish land and acquiring additional munitions, early victories instilled confidence in the rebellion and garnered further Kurdish support.

Throughout the conflict, Said's fighters used both conventional military tactics, including multi-front assaults and attempts at urban seizure, and unconventional warfare, including guerrilla tactics. An example of the conventional military organization was evident in the assault on Diyarbakır, where reports saw "three columns of 5,000 strong, under the personal command of Shaykh Said".

== First Iraqi–Kurdish War (1961–1970) ==
In September 1961, Kurdish leader Mustafa Barzani openly revolted against Baghdad's authority. He started with 600 followers, but by spring 1962 had 5,000 full-time guerrillas and another 5,000–15,000 who could be called to assist for short periods of time. When he attacked in autumn 1961 he caught Iraqi government forces, principally the 2nd Division, unprepared. Qasim ordered a counterattack, and the 2nd Division was able to reverse most of the Kurdish gains before Barzani's forces were compelled to withdraw into the mountains during the winter of 1961–62.

== Second Iraqi–Kurdish War (1974–1975) ==
Secret negotiations between Barzani and Saddam Hussein led to the "March Manifesto". The agreement included a pledge from the Kurds to stop their rebellion, and in exchange the regime would allow the establishment of a Kurdish autonomous region in areas where the Kurds were a majority. The agreement was to be implemented within four years. However, during those four years the regime encouraged the "Arabization" of the oil-rich Kurdish areas. After decreasing the percentage of Kurds in the north for four years, the regime demanded the implementation of the manifesto. The Kurds weren't willing to implement it. After the ultimatum extended by the Ba'ath regime expired, the manifesto became a law on March 11, 1974. Clashes between the rebels and the Iraqi security forces erupted immediately. The fighting cost the lives of 10,000 Iraqi soldiers. The Iraqi army was unable to crush the rebellion because of Iran's continual assistance to the rebels, Tehran even deployed two divisions of the Iranian Army inside Iraq in January 1975. Saddam Hussein, having committed to confrontation with the Kurds, was determined not to lose the fight. In late 1974 he began negotiations with the Iranian Shah Mohammad Reza Pahlavi. An agreement was reached and signed by the sides during an OPEC summit in Algiers. The Agreement guaranteed that Iran would stop assisting the Kurdish rebels. In exchange Iraq agreed to demarcate the joint border with Iran according to the Treaty of Constantinople (1913). In the 1913 treaty the border line in the Shatt al-Arab was in the middle (thalweg) of the waterway, and not as was previously decided in 1937 between the countries. In the 1937 understanding Iraq's territorial water extended to most of the Shatt.

The Shah stopped the Iranian support to the rebels, withdrew his forces and sealed the border on April 1. The Iraqi army was able to crush the Peshmerga rebellion until the end of March. Many leaders of the Kurds, including Mustafa Barzani fled to Iran and others to Turkey.

== Iraq War (2003–2011) ==
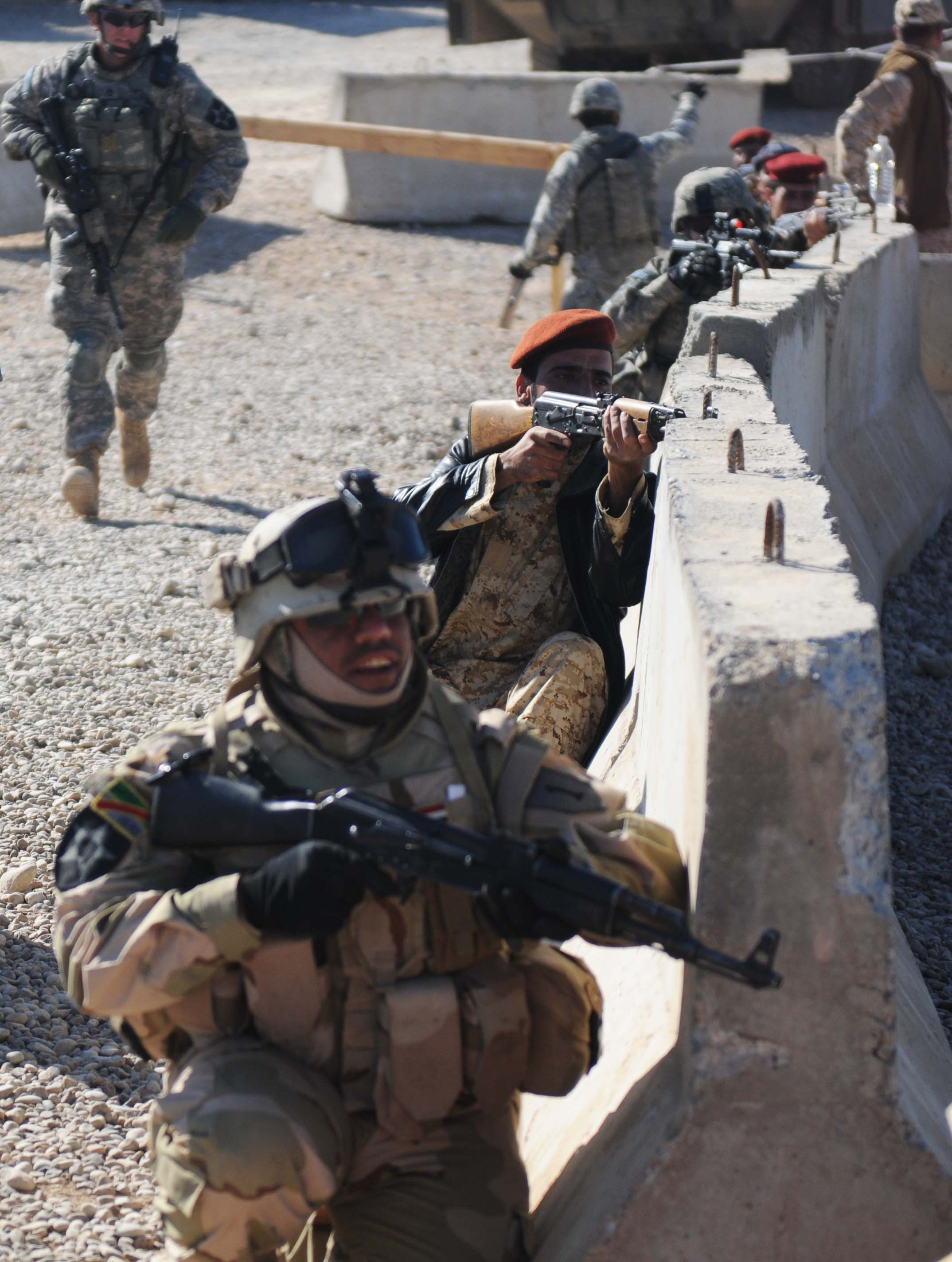
Soldiers of the Iraqi army, Peshmerga, and the 1st Squadron, 14th Cavalry Regiment react to a grenade thrown from a vehicle during a training exercise.

The Peshmerga linked up with the CIA's Special Activities Division (SAD) and the U.S. Military's 10th Special Forces Group and prepared the battle space for conventional U.S. Military forces throughout Iraq. The first step was evicting the Ansar al-Islam from their enclave around the village of Biyara. This battle happened prior to the invasion in February 2003 and was carried out with officers from SAD and the U.S. Army's 10th Special Forces Group. Most Ansar al-Islam fighters were killed during this operation, but some escaped to Iran and later regrouped in Iraq as the Ansar al-Sunnah.

US and Peshmerga spokesmen also claimed to have uncovered a chemical weapons facility at Sargat, the only facility of its type discovered in the Iraq War, which could not have been unnoticed by the government of Saddam Hussein.

In addition, this team led the Peshmerga against Saddam's forces in the north. Their efforts kept the 5th Corps of Saddam's Army in place to defend against the Kurds rather than move to contest the coalition force coming from the south. The efforts of the SAD Paramilitary Officers and 10th Special Forces Group with the Kurds likely saved hundreds, if not thousands, of lives of the coalition service members during and after the invasion.

As an ally of the US-led coalition, Peshmerga forces fought side by side with American troops in the Iraq War in Iraqi Kurdistan. Since that time, the Peshmerga have assumed full responsibility for the security of the Kurdish areas of Northern Iraq. In late 2004, when Arab Iraqi Police and Iraqi National Guard (ING) units in the city of Mosul collapsed in the face of an insurgent uprising, Kurdish Peshmerga battalions, who had recently been converted into ING forces, led the counter-attack alongside US military units. To this day, there are a number of Kurdish battalions of former Peshmerga in the Iraqi Army serving in Northern Iraq. These units are mostly part of the reformed 2nd Division, stationed in Mosul.

In early 2005 it was speculated by Newsweek magazine that Peshmerga forces would be trained by the US to take on Sunni rebels in Iraq. A recent CBS News report places their number at 375,000.

In 2008, many Peshmerga soldiers were put into new formations under the interior ministry, one of which is the Zeravani, who are loyal to the Kurdistan Democratic Party. Back in 2008, the Zeravani was a force of 8,000 soldiers but has grown in numbers (to 25,000 as of 2011) and now operate seven bases inside Iraqi Kurdistan. One of the bases is a dedicated airbase for training on ultralight fixed-wing aircraft (Ikarus C42). The Zeravani forces are led by Brigadier General Aziz Waysi Bani.

In 2012, the Kurdish leadership put into effect a program to unify the Kurdish forces of PUK and KDP, both of which operated as separate armies inside the region before the unification. The unification program plans on having a total size of 18 brigades, which will be finalized by mid-2014.

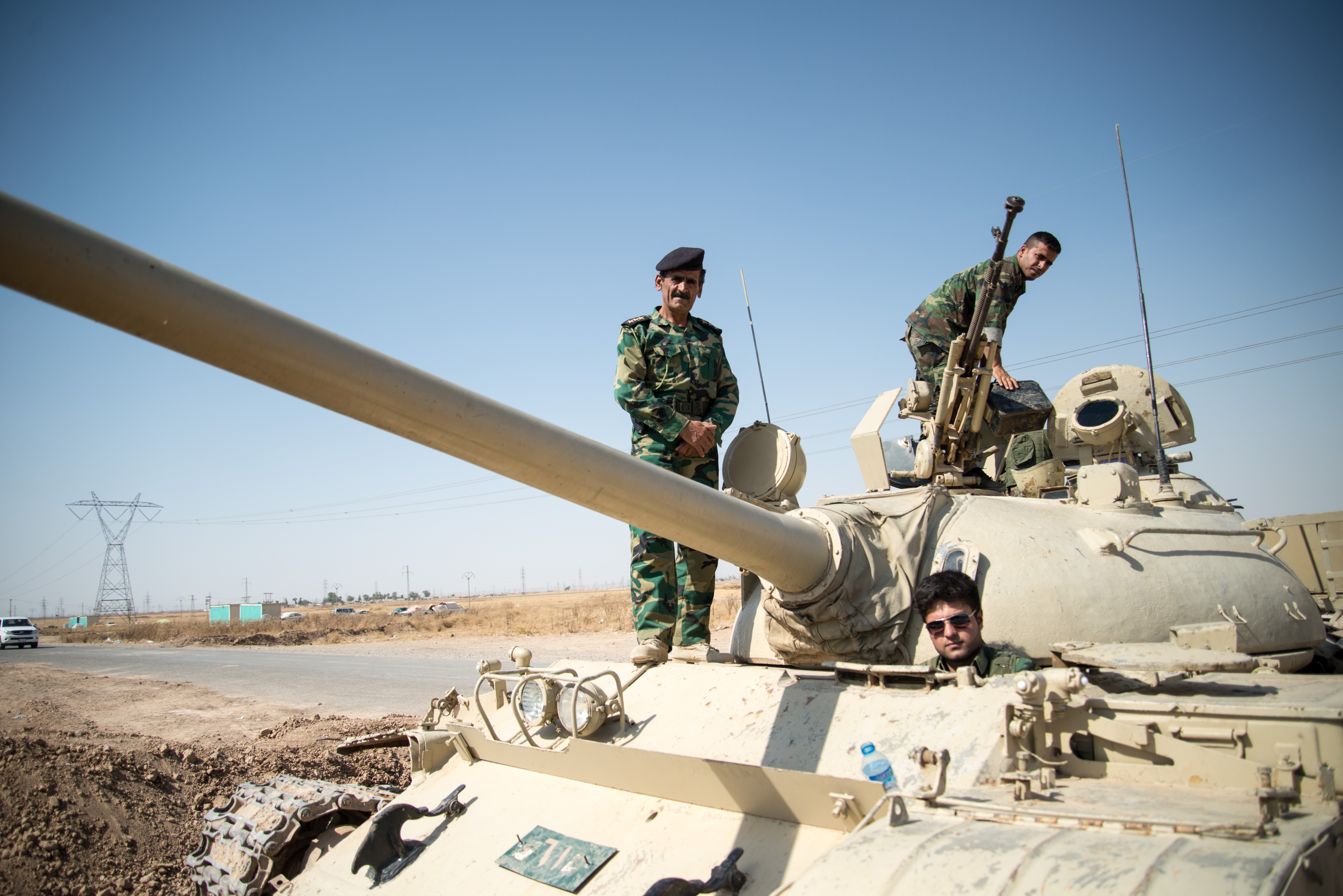
Peshmerga on a T-55 tank outside Kirkuk in Iraq

The Peshmerga are organizing their own Special Operations Force (SOF) which will incorporate many of the Cobra battalions. The Cobra forces are elite infantry soldiers found in many units inside the Peshmerga, including the Presidential brigade (in Baghdad there are three Cobra companies) and Intelligence battalion (identical with the Presidential brigade, except it has a scout company equipped with the BRDM-2 armoured patrol car instead of the third Cobra company). Many military experts also speculate that the EC120 B and the MD 530F helicopters which the KRG is getting might be used as helicopter support for the SOF brigade in the future. Officially, they are destined for the interior police forces.

The Peshmerga have traditionally had a problem with funding, mainly due to their large size. The Peshmerga forces had no live training on their heavy weapons up until 2011 due to lack of ammunition. The problem was tackled after it was put in the media spotlight. Now all heavy-weapon formations have at least 120 hours of live-fire training and taken part in six large military exercises. The Kurdish leadership will also be cutting the size of Peshmerga to pave the way for a faster modernization of the Kurdish forces.

Peshmerga in Iraqi Kurdistan said they had taken control of the city of Kirkuk and provided logistical assistance to Iraqi government troops during the 2014 Northern Iraq offensive by Sunni militants.
