= Carina Perelli =

Former UN electoral chief (born 1957)

Carina Perelli (born March 29, 1957) (died September 9, 2026) was an international expert in elections, constitutional arrangements, governance, security and defense related matters. She was executive vice-president of IFES and also the former director of UN Electoral Assistance Division between 1998 and 2005.

== Early life and education ==
Perelli was born and raised in Montevideo, Uruguay. Her secondary school education was at the Lycée Français de Montevideo, where she obtained a bachelor's degree in literature. She earned a bachelor's degree in Social Work from the University of the Republic of Uruguay (Universidad de la República (UDELAR). During the civic-military Uruguayan dictatorship (which lasted from 1973 to 1984), Perelli obtained a degree in sociology from a course offered in CLAEH (Centro Latino Americano de Economía Humana) and received a postgraduate degree in sociology from the Facultad Latinoamericana de Ciencias Sociales-Centro de Informaciones y Estudios sobre el Uruguay (a joint program with FLACSO). In 1986, Perelli received her ABD (All But Dissertation) and a master's degree in the Department of Government and International Relations at the University of Notre Dame, Indiana.

== Early career ==
She worked as a French teacher at the Lycée Français of Montevideo and as a political science professor at both the Universidad de la República (UDELAR) and the Universidad Católica Dámaso Antonio Larrañaga (UCDAL) in Montevideo. She was a Researcher at two investigative centers of social science (CIESU and PEITHO Sociedad de Análisis Político).

In 1989 and 1990 she was in Paris as a Research Fellow at the Fondation Nationale de Sciences Politiques, Centre D'Études et de Recherches Internationales (CERI). In 1991, she was a visiting fellow in the Wilson Center for Scholars (Washington DC) and later on was a Fulbright Fellow at Georgetown University, DC.

== East Timor ==
She was the team leader of the UN Electoral Component in the East Timor referendum that led to the country's independence. After the pro-Indonesians lost the referendum, Perelli was among the UN personnel, the locals, and the internationals that were surrounded by the pro-Indonesians in the UN compound. After receiving an order of evacuation, Perelli was one of the leaders among the internationals that decided to remain in the compound to protect the East Timorese refugees. Afterwards, working very closely with Sergio Vieira the Mello, she was the leader of the new electoral process that established the first government in East Timor.

== Iraq ==
In Iraq she was the International Commissioner ad interim in Iraq for the Constitutional Referendum of October 2005 and stayed until its conclusion. As the International Commissioner, with powers delegated as the international non-voting member of the Iraqi Board of Commissioners, she negotiated the voting of detainees with the Multinational Force, as well as with the Iraqi Ministries of Defense, Interior and Justice. She physically inspected conditions at Abu Ghraib prison to ensure that standards for polling were met (she was the first UN official to be given permission to enter Abu Ghraib), and made recommendations to the Board on appropriate special voting procedures for detainees and for patients in hospitals. With this delegation of authority, she also established the audit of results system that was used when voting patterns had the risk of being contested and she oversaw its implementation. Her duties as the International Commissioner included her discussing and adopting regulations with the Board, overseeing the organization, conducting the referendum, and adjudicating disputes and challenges. She also negotiated with the Transitional National Assembly the terms of which electoral system was to be used in the December 2005 parliamentary elections, and helped the Board of Commissioners decide on the appropriate regulatory framework for its implementation.

While staying in Iraq as the International Commissioner, she continued to oversee the EAD's (Electoral Assistance Division) work and lead a sensitive political negotiation to reform the electoral system in Lebanon by setting a team to advice the High Level Commission established by Prime Minister Siniora to that effect.

== Dismissal from UN and her reclamations ==
In December 2005 she was summarily dismissed. She was accused of misconduct on allegations of harassment – including sexual harassment and abuse of authority. An investigation conducted by a United Nations Disciplinary Panel during 2006 reached the conclusion that the demission was achieved without due process and the allegations were unproved and unfounded. A revision of the case by the United Nations Administrative justice system, after more than seven years, on 28 March 2013, concluded that her summary dismissal was legally and factually unsustainable.

== IFES Executive Vice-president ==
She started a professional relationship with IFES (International Foundation for Electoral Systems) in 1993. She did field work for IFES in the Dominican Republic, West Bank/Gaza, and Paraguay.

In 2008, she returned to work for IFES first as a consultant and, in 2009, she became the Executive Vice President of IFES.

== Afghanistan ==
In 2002, she worked in Afghanistan with the United Nations. She returned to Afghanistan in 2009 in order to lead IFES’ Electoral Assistance Projects. Part of her job was to negotiate a second turn of the Afghani presidential elections in 2009. Working jointly with UNAMA (United Nations Assistance Mission in Afghanistan), she continued advising several political actors both, local and international, on the political process. She was in Kabul from 2010 to February 2012 as Country Director, Chief of Party, of the STEP Project of IFES, providing guidance to the electoral process, managing a budget of 70 million plus.

In March 2012, she finished her involvement as IFES executive vicepresident.

== Consultant ==
In 2012, Perelli return at her work as a consultant.

== Selected publications ==
Books

• 1995. Partidos y clase política en América Latina en los noventa (Political parties and political class in Latin American in the '90s) Co-editor with Sonia Picado and Daniel Zovatto. [San José: IIDH/CAPEL]

• 1991. Gobierno y política en Montevideo (Government and Politics in Montevideo) Co-author with Fernando Filgueira and Silvana Rubino. [Montevideo: Peitho].

• 1990. Los militares y la gestión pública. [Montevideo: Peitho. Serie Mayéutica].

• 1987. Someter o convencer. El discurso militar en el Uruguay. (To subdue or to convince. Military discourse in Uruguay), [Montevideo: EBO-CLADE].

Articles

• 2016 “No Exit: The Past and Future of Afghanistan’s National Unity Government” Washington USIP CO-author with Scott Smith.

• 2014 “Líbano: ¿Próxima Víctima o Sobreviviente? Un vestigio del Imperio Otomano navegando aguas turbulentas” Buenos Aires, Resdal.

• 2014 “Lebanon: A remnant of the Ottoman Empire trying to survive in a region in turmoil”, Buenos Aires, Resdal.

• 2013 “What to Expect When You Are Expecting Fraud in the Afghan Elections of 2014 and What to Do about It. Some Recommendations for the International Community” Washington, USIP Co-author with Scott Smith.

• 2013 “A modest proposal for a new approach to the analysis of the Mali and Sahel Crisis” Buenos Aires, RESDAL.

• 2010 “Report on Afghanistan IFES STEP Program” February 2010.

• 2008 “Strategic Concept Challenges and Opportunities in Providing Assistance to Parliaments” IFES.

• 2008 “Political Dialogue” A brief summary. Presentation before Democracy Council. Canada.

• 2007. “The paradoxes of elections and transitions: when is a Nation ready for elections?” in Richard W. Soudriette and Juliana Geran Pilon: Every vote counts. The role of elections in building democracy. Lanham, MD. University Press of America.

• 2006 [Elecciones] “Algunas reflexiones desde la practica” RCCP. Santiago.

• 1995. "Paraguay. Pre-Election Technical Assessment" (with MM. Villaveces y D. M. Cepeda) (Washington D. C. IFES).

• 1995. "Changing Military World Views: Old Menaces, New Linkanges" (co-author with Juan Rial) in Richard L. Millet and Michael Gold-Biss (eds.): Beyond Praetorianism: The Latin American Military in Transition.(Miami: North-South Center Press, University of Miami).

• 1994. "Memoria de Sangre: Fear, Hope and Disenchantment in Argentina" in Boyarin, Jonathan (ed.) Remapping Memory: The Politics of TimeSpace (Minneapolis / London: University of Minnesota Press, pp. 39 –66).

• 1993. "Backwards into the future. The new caudillos in the framework of the retreat of the State in South America". Peitho. Working Papers # 84.

• 1991 "From Counterrevolutionary Warfare to Political Awakening. The Uruguayan and Argentine Armed Forces in the seventies"

a) PEITHO Working Papers # 79.

b) in Armed Forces & Society Vol 20, Nº1. Fall 1993. pp. 25–49.

• 1991 "The new military ethos in Latin America." in Peitho. Documento de Trabajo # 80 in Spanish.

o 1991"Settling accounts with blood memory: The case of Argentina."

a) PEITHO Working Papers # 77. Presented at the seminar "The Politics of Memory" (Portsmouth, New Hampshire.)

b) Published in Social Research Vol 59, No 2 (Summer 1992) pp. 415–451.

• 1990 "The legacies of the processes of transition to democracy in Argentina and Uruguay". in Louis Goodman, Johanna S.R.Mendelson & Juan Rial (eds.): The Military and Democracy. The future of Civil-Military Relations in Latin America. Lexington Mass/ Toronto D.C. Heath. Lexington Books. pp. 39–54. American University /PEITHO.

• 1990 "The perception of threat and the political thinking of the military in South America" in Louis Goodman et al.: The Military and Democracy, pp. 93–106.

• 1989 "Putting conservatism to good use. Women and Unorthodox Politics in Uruguay, from Breakdown to Transition" in Jane Jaquette (ed.): The Women's Movements in Latin America. Feminism and the Transitions to Democracy. Boston. Unwin Hyman. pp. 95–123.
