= 2005 Kurdistan Region independence referendum =

- 30 January 2005
- Do you want Kurdistan to become an independent state?

Results
Choice	Votes	%
Yes	1,973,412	98.98%
No	20,251	1.02%
Valid votes	1,993,663	99.78%
Invalid or blank votes	4,398	0.22%
Total votes	1,998,061	100.00%
- Results by Governorate

An informal independence referendum for Kurdistan Region was held on 30 January 2005, with final results showing the vast majority of votes, 98.98 per cent, cast in favour of independence. Conducted by the Kurdistan Referendum Movement alongside the Iraqi parliamentary elections and Kurdistan Region elections of 2005, the referendum asked the people of Kurdistan Region whether they favoured remaining a part of Iraq or were in favour of an independent Kurdistan.

== Background ==
On 22 December 2004, a non-partisan delegation headed by Ardishir Rashidi-Kalhur, president of the Kurdish American Education Society met with Carina Perelli, Head of the U.N. Electoral Assistance Division and staff, at the United Nations Headquarters in New York, to hand over 1,732,535 signatures, which were collected endorsing the call for an independence referendum on the future of Southern Kurdistan.

The referendum was held at the end of the term of the Iraqi Interim Government.

== Impact ==
The referendum did not lead to the independence of Kurdistan because of threats from neighboring countries, but the Kurdistan Region was granted autonomy in the Constitution of Iraq adopted on October 15, 2005.

== Results ==
Area:	Independence	Stay in Iraq	Total	Independence %	Stay in Iraq %
Kirkuk:	131,274	181	131,582	99.88	0.12
Nineveh:	165,780	111	165,891	99.93	0.07
Diyala:	35,786	627	36,413	98.28	1.72
Sulaymaniyah:	650,000	5,796	656,496	99.12	0.88
Erbil:	622,409	11,289	636,898	98.23	1.77
Duhok:	368,163	2,247	370,781	99.39	0.61
Total:	1,973,412	20,251	1,998,061	98.88%	1.12%

== See also ==
- 2017 Kurdistan Region independence referendum
