= Battle of Kirkuk (2017) =

Battle between Kurds and government forces in Iraq

- Part of the 2017 Iraqi–Kurdish conflict
- Map of the offensive
Date	15–20 October 2017 (5 days)
Location	Kirkuk Governorate, Iraq
Result	Iraqi victory
Territorial changes	Iraqi government forces defeat the Peshmerga and retake control of the entire Kirkuk Governorate, including the city of Kirkuk, K-1 Air Base, Kirkuk International Airport and Altun Kupri.

Belligerents
Iraq; Popular Mobilisation Forces	Kurdistan Region; Kurdistan Workers' Party (denied by KRG); White Flags

Commanders and leaders
(Iraq) Haider al-Abadi (Commander-in-chief) (Iraq) Lt. Gen. Juma Inad (Ground Forces commander) (Iraq) Maj. Gen. Ma’an al-Saedi (ISOF-2 commander)	(Kurdistan Region) Masoud Barzani; Assi al-Qawali

Units involved
(Iraq) Iraqi Army; 9th Armoured Division; ISOF-2; PMF; Turkmen Brigades; Iraqi Turkmen Front	(Kurdistan Region) Peshmerga; People's Defence Forces

Strength
Unknown 200–300 armoured vehicles	9,000 Peshmerga forces

Casualties and losses
7 dead (Kirkuk hospital claim) 150 killed or wounded and one tanks destroyed (KDP claim)	25 killed, 45 wounded (hospital claim); 105 killed 200 wounded 45 captured (PUK claim)

The Battle of Kirkuk, codenamed Operation Enforcing Security (Note: Arabic: عملية فرض الأمن في كركوك) of the 2017 Iraqi–Kurdish conflict, was a military deployment by the Iraqi Security Forces to retake Kirkuk Governorate from the Peshmerga after the latter ignored repeated warnings to withdraw, sparking clashes between the two forces. The advance began on 15 October 2017, with the city of Kirkuk being retaken upon entry of the Iraqi forces as the Kurds fled immediately. Five days later the entirety of the governorate was under full control of the Iraqi forces; meanwhile, other Iraqi forces continued their advances in subsequent days, defeating the Peshmerga forces across vast swathes of territory in northern Iraq.

== Background ==
The battle followed the 2017 Iraqi Kurdistan independence referendum when voters overwhelmingly supported (93%) "the Kurdistan Region and the Kurdistani areas outside the administration of the Region" to become an independent state. The Kurdistan Region considered the referendum binding, while the Iraqi government regarded it as illegal. The oil-rich and multi-ethnic city of Kirkuk was the subject of long-running dispute and is not recognised by the Iraqi government as part of the autonomous Kurdistan Region. Before the Islamic State of Iraq and the Levant (ISIL) invaded Kirkuk was under Iraqi control. Kirkuk was taken from ISIL by Kurdish forces. The Kurdish Peshmerga ignored a deadline given by Iraq to withdraw from the area by 15 October 2017 and the operation to take the territory back under the control of the central Iraqi government was initiated. Within 15 hours, the city of Kirkuk, surrounding oil fields and several facilities including the military airport were retaken by Iraqi forces.

== The battle ==
The Kurdish Peshmerga ignored a deadline given by the Iraqi government to withdraw from disputed areas by 15 October 2017. This led to the Iraqi forces and the Popular Mobilisation Force (PMF) retaking Kirkuk and its province on the same day. Within 15 hours, the city of Kirkuk and the nearby K-1 Air Base, along with surrounding oilfields, were retaken by Iraqi forces. Most Peshmerga abandoned the city without resistance. This, in turn, led to the collapse of Peshmerga defences, and to large-scale accusations of betrayal on the part of the Talabani family by the KDP, since the day before the Battle of Kirkuk, both parties had met in Dukan and had agreed to fight. On the same day, Iraqi forces advanced on and captured the city of Tuz Khurmatu in Saladin Governorate, 60 km (37 mi) south of Kirkuk, as well as Kifri in the Diyala Governorate.

The following day, Iraqi forces continued to advance by seizing the Baba GurGur oil field. In Tuz Khurmatu, two people were killed in exchanges of artillery fire. At the end of 16 October, the Iraqi Army announced that they had taken full control of the city as U.S.-trained counter-terrorism forces captured the provincial government headquarters. Afterward, celebrations could be heard from ethnic Turkmen in Kirkuk. PUK Peshmerga units came to an agreement with the Iraqi government forces to withdraw from their positions in Kirkuk, but KDP affiliated Peshmerga units continued to resist the Iraqi advance, entrenching themselves in positions near the city of Dibis. However, later on 16 October Kurdish units near Dibis received orders to withdraw and abandoned the city ahead of the Iraqi advance. The Iraqi government claimed on 16 October that it had taken full control of the city of Kirkuk. Kurdish reports indicated that their lines to the south of the city of Kirkuk crumbled as soon as they were engaged by Iraqi M1A1 Abrams tanks.

On the third day of the battle, Iraqi forces made further advances, taking the Bai Hassan and Avana oil fields near Kirkuk. By the end of 17 October the Iraqi government claimed to have retaken all of the oil facilities it had held prior to the ISIL advance on the area in 2014. On 18 October the Iraqi government declared that they had completed its objectives in the offensive. On 20 October, the Iraqi forces, composed of Iraqi Counter-Terrorism Service units, Federal Police and PMF, announced that after a three-hour battle they had secured the last Kurdish-controlled town of Altun Kupri in Kirkuk Governorate, which was previously under Kurdish control. This effectively allowed the Iraqi government to secure control of the remainder of Kirkuk Governorate.

== Aftermath ==
=== Violence and displacement ===
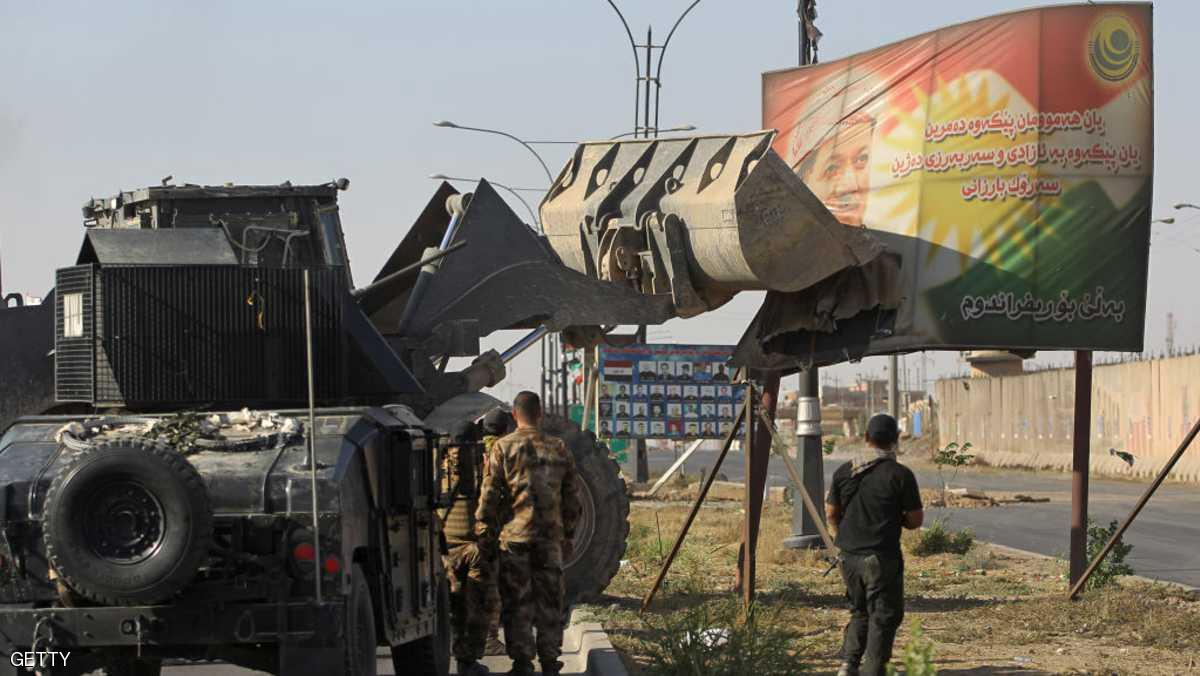
Iraqi soldiers break a poster of Barzani

On 16 October, The Guardian posted video footage showing streams of ethnic Kurdish refugees fleeing Kirkuk in cars. Many of the displaced returned after Iraqi President Haider el-Abadi promised on television that their lives and property would be preserved. On 19 October, Nawzad Hadi, Governor of Erbil, the capital of the Kurdistan Region, told reporters that around 18,000 families from Kirkuk and the town of Tuz Khurmatu had taken refuge in Erbil and Sulaimaniyah, inside KRG territory. A Hadi aide told Reuters news agency the total number of displaced people was about 100,000. The figure could not be independently verified and Reuters reported that many Kurdish neighbourhoods in Kirkuk city appeared to not have experienced many evacuations. Hemin Hawrami, a senior assistant to KRG President Masoud Barzani, said in a post on Twitter that 57,000 families from Kirkuk were in need of "immediate assistance" after arriving in Erbil, Sulaimaniyah and Duhok provinces. He said that people had fled "violence, looting and crimes" inflicted by the PMF, paramilitary units largely made up of Iranian trained Shia militias. A refugee told Al Jazeera they had fled because "At night, they come out and beat the youth. They have burned houses." The United Nations released a statement that it was "concerned about reports regarding the destruction and looting of houses, businesses and political offices, and forced displacement of civilians, predominantly Kurds, from disputed areas", and urged that the perpetrators be brought to justice. A total of 85,000 civilians have returned to their homes in Kirkuk a source inside the Iraqi Ministry of Displacement and Migration announced on 23 October 2017.

On 19 October it was reported that UN relief offices received reports that 150 houses in the town of Tuz Khurmatu were burnt down and 11 houses were blown up, while the offices of local Turkmen political parties which had supported Kurdish independence were subjected to assaults. Prime Minister al-Abadi described the incidents as having been caused by "extremist elements from both sides". Al-Abadi accused social media instigators of posting fake videos of the alleged violations. Niqash confirmed the increase of fake news and hundreds of fake videos and pictures. Leaders on both sides say it is leading to a dangerous escalation of tensions in northern Iraq. The Iranian-backed Shi'ite Hashd al-Shaabi militia is reported to have detonated and burnt homes owned by ethnic Kurds, and, while wearing the uniforms of the Iraqi federal police, used security as a pretext to raid the homes of Kurds and commit acts of violence.

On 25 October, Reuters reported that humanitarian organisations estimated that the number of Kurds displaced from the city of Tuz Khurmato was 30,000 out of a total population of around 100,000; Amnesty International noted that "satellite images, videos, photos and dozens of testimonies indicate that hundreds of properties were looted, set on fire and destroyed in what appeared to be a targeted attack on predominantly Kurdish areas of the city of about 100,000 people." According to an Oxfam manager, Kurdish refugees from Tuz Khurmatu were staying in the open and in public places such as mosques and schools, and were in dire need of emergency aid and psychological support due to the traumatic incidents they had witnessed. Amnesty International said that at least 11 people had been killed, citing the testimony of those who had escaped from the city, and said they had been attacked by Turkmen Shiite militiamen.

== Reactions ==
- United States: President Donald Trump expressed his discontent that both sides are fighting, in which he mentioned that "we don't like the fact that they're clashing. We're not taking sides".
- Turkey: In a statement on 16 October 2017 the ministry said that Turkey closely monitors Iraq's steps to "restore its constitutional sovereignty over Kirkuk, a homeland for Turkmens for centuries, after referendum conducted by the KRG".
- Iraq: In a statement the Iraqi government accused Kurdish authorities of bringing fighters from Turkey's outlawed Kurdistan Workers' Party (PKK) to the disputed province of Kirkuk, in a move it called a "declaration of war".
- Operation Inherent Resolve (OIR): In a statement on 16 October 2017 the international coalition announced that coalition forces and advisors are not supporting either activities of Iraq or Kurdistan Region near Kirkuk and strongly urged all sides to avoid escalatory actions.
- Rival Kurdish factions accused each other of betraying Kirkuk to Iraqi forces.
- KRG Vice-President Kosrat Rasul called the Iraqi forces in Kirkuk and other areas an "occupation"; for this, Iraq's Supreme Court Justice Council ordered his arrest.

== See also ==
- Battle of Kirkuk (2016)
- Battle of Hawija
- 2017 Western Iraq campaign
