= Altun Kupri =

- Town
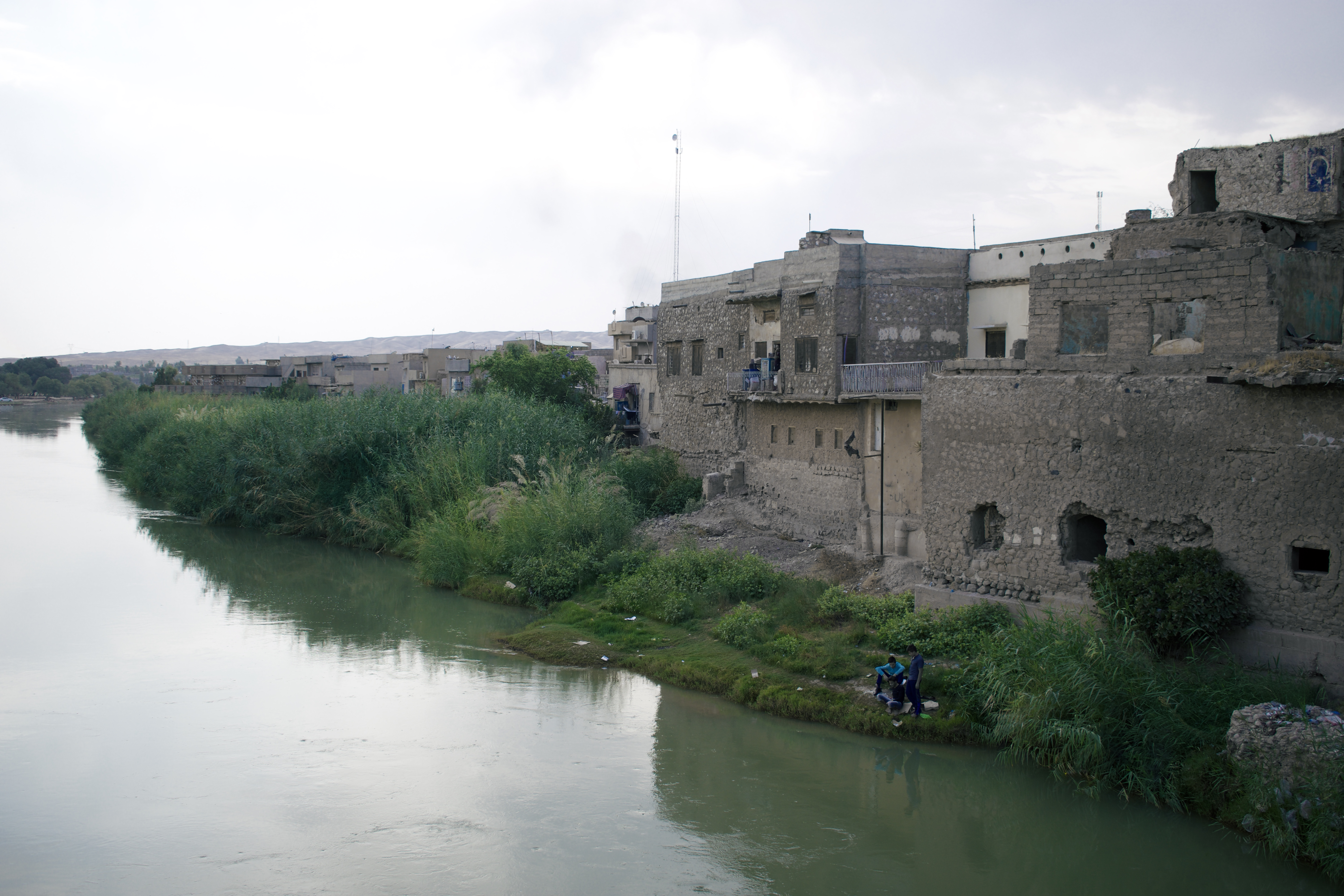

- Location in Iraq
- Coordinates: 35°45′12″N 44°08′37″E
- Country: Iraq
- Governorate: Kirkuk Governorate
- District: Kirkuk
- Elevation: 284 m (932 ft)

Population (2024)
  - Total: 31,542

Altun Kupri (Arabic: التون كوبري, Turkish: Altınköprü, lit. 'Golden Bridge', Kurdish: پردێ, romanized: Pirdê or Prde) is a town in Kirkuk Governorate, Iraq. Its inhabitants are predominantly Turkmen, with a minority of Kurds and Arabs. It is located on the banks of the Little Zab and lies along the Erbil–Kirkuk road. The town is described as having an 'intrinsic strategic significance' and is disputed.

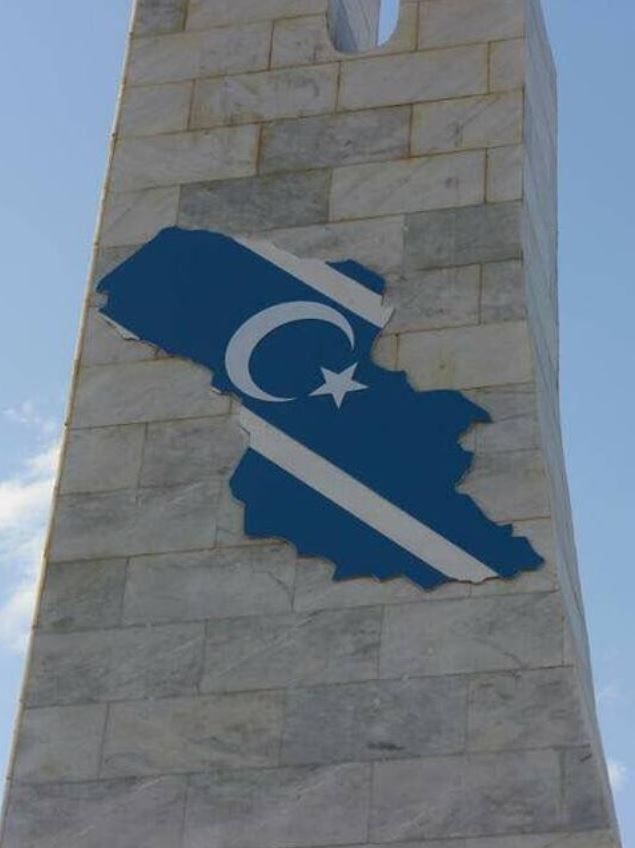
A map of Turkmeneli on a monument in Altun Kupri.

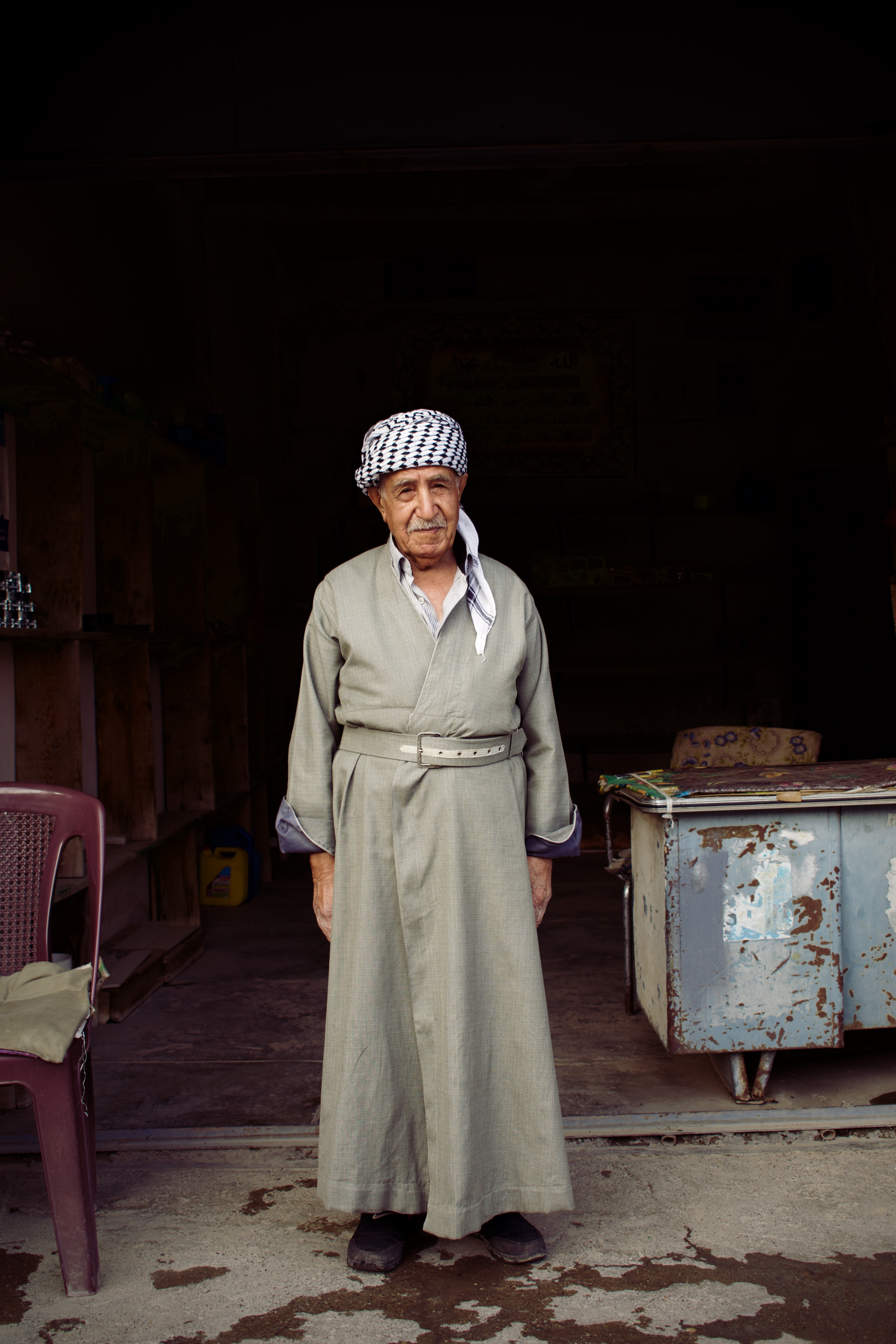
Local resident wearing traditional Turkmen clothes in Altun Kupri.

== Etymology ==
Altun Kupri is the Anglicized version of the Iraqi Turkmen word for "altın köprü" in standard Turkish language, which is literally 'Golden Bridge' in English.

There are different theories for the town's name. Some believe that 'Golden Bridge' refers to a Turkish or Kurdish woman of that name, while others believe it refers to the colorful caravans that passed the town and its bridge on their way between Mosul and Baghdad.

== History ==
Ottoman Sultan Murad IV built two bridges in the town which made it gain importance. It was visited by many European travellers and known for its scenery.

Altun Kupri had approximately 400 to 500 households by the end of the 18th century. Mirza Abu Taleb Khan visited the town in 1799, describing it as a big village with a mixed Kurdish and Turkmen population busy with farming. Moreover, it was a trading center between Kurdistan and Baghdad for figs, grapes and other agricultural products. Under the reign of Muhammad Pasha of Soran (1813–1836) he was able to extend his influence to this town and force the Ottoman governor of Baghdad to recognize his control. In 1906, the town had 4,000 inhabitants. The Ottomans destroyed the town's famous stone-built bridges in 1918 and replaced it with modern steel constructions.

In 1925, the town's population was predominantly Turkmen.

The town experienced Arabization during the Saddam era and an increased militarization to counter uprisings in the north from spreading towards Kirkuk.

More than a hundred Turkmen civilians were killed in the 1991 Altun Köpru massacre during the Gulf War by the Iraqi Army.

In October 2017, the town was captured by the Iraqi Army and PMU forces amid the broader 2017 Iraqi–Kurdish conflict and the ensuing Battle of Altun Kupri.

== Demographics ==
In the 1947 census Kurds constituted 70% of the population but decreased to 50% in 1957. In the census of 1965, the percentage of Kurds fell further to 25.7% but increased again to 75.6% in 1977.

In the 2005 elections, the DPAK received 80% of the vote in the sub-district of Altun Kupri.
