= 2017 Kurdistan Region independence referendum =

Referendum for Kurdish Independence

Kurdistan Region independence referendum
- 25 September 2017
- "Do you want the Kurdistan Region and the Kurdistani areas outside the administration of the Region to become an independent state?"
- Location of Kurdistan Region in Iraq in September 2017. Recognized territory of the Kurdistan Region where the referendum was held Disputed territory of the Kurdistan Region where the referendum was held; Iraq recaptured all of this territory after the referendum Rest of Iraq
- Outcome: Yes vote wins: Military conflict between the Iraqi government and the Kurdistan Regional Government leading to the latter losing 40% of its territory; President of Kurdistan Region Masoud Barzani resigns on 29 October 2017, referendum effectively abandoned; Federal Supreme Court of Iraq rules the referendum unconstitutional and secession illegal

Results
Choice	Votes	%
Yes	2,861,471	92.73%
No	224,464	7.27%
Valid votes	3,085,935	93.35%
Invalid or blank votes	219,990	6.65%
Total votes	3,305,925	100.00%
Registered voters/turnout	4,581,255	72.16%

The 2017 Kurdistan Region independence referendum was a failed bid at Kurdish independence from the Republic of Iraq. It was held on 25 September 2017 in Kurdistan Region, with preliminary results showing approximately 92.73 percent of votes cast in favor of independence. Despite reporting that the independence referendum would be non-binding, the Kurdistan Regional Government (KRG) characterized it as binding, although they claimed that an affirmative result would trigger the start of state building and negotiations with Iraq rather than an immediate declaration of independence of Kurdistan. The referendum's legality was rejected by the federal government of Iraq and the Federal Supreme Court. The referendum prompted a military confrontation, and after their defeat, the KRG eventually conceded and accepted the Supreme Court's ruling that no Iraqi governorate is allowed to secede.

It was originally planned to be held in 2014 amidst controversy and dispute between the regional and federal governments. Calls for Kurdish independence had been going on for years, with an unofficial 2005 referendum resulting in 98.98% voting in favor of independence. These longstanding calls gained impetus following the Northern Iraq offensive by Islamic State in Iraq and the Levant during the Iraqi Civil War in which Baghdad-controlled forces abandoned some areas, which were then taken by the Peshmerga and controlled de facto by the Kurds.

The referendum was announced and delayed on several occasions as Kurdish forces co-operated with the Iraqi central government for the liberation of Mosul, but by April 2017, it was being seen as happening some time in 2017. On 7 June 2017, Kurdish President Masoud Barzani held a meeting with the Kurdistan Democratic Party (KDP), the Patriotic Union of Kurdistan (PUK), and other ruling parties, where the independence referendum was confirmed to be held on 25 September 2017.

The referendum led to a military conflict with the Iraqi central government, in which the KRG lost 40 percent of its territory and its main source of revenue, the Kirkuk oil fields. Following the loss, Kurdistan Region president Masoud Barzani resigned and the referendum was thus effectively abandoned.

== Background ==
The Kurdistan Regional Government had criticized Iraqi Prime Minister Nouri al-Maliki, claiming that his rule was divisive. After the central government began withholding funding to the Kurdistan Regional Government in January 2014, the KRG attempted to export oil via the northern pipeline into Turkey in May, but the Iraqi government lobbied international governments to block the export and sale of this oil.

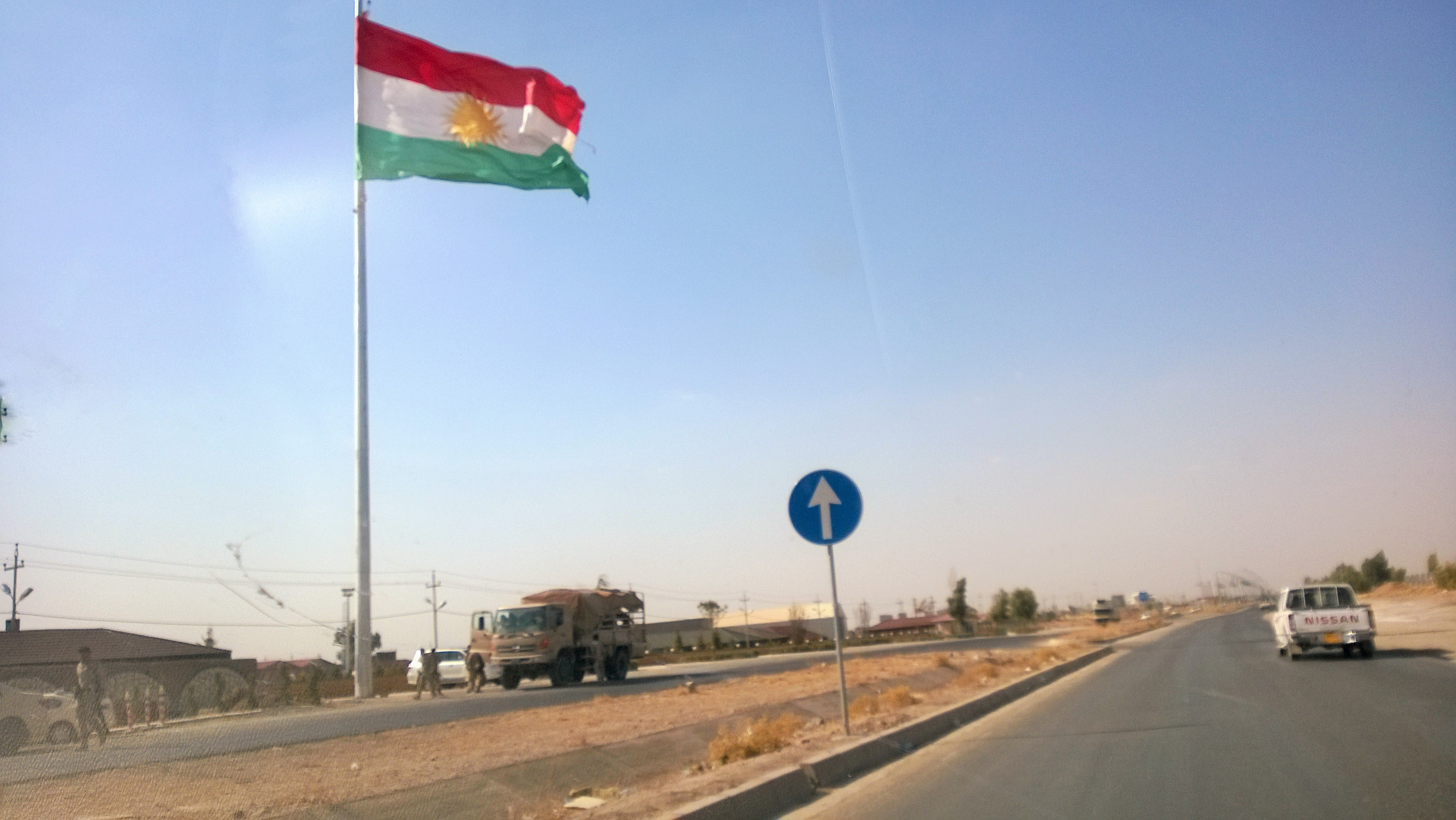
The flag of Kurdistan flies over the disputed city of Kirkuk after it was abandoned by Iraqi forces in June 2014 as the ISIL militant group approached.

As jihadis affiliated with the Islamic State of Iraq and the Levant (ISIL) took control of much of western and northern Iraq in June 2014, the Iraqi military in those areas largely disintegrated and abandoned their positions. The Peshmerga stepped into this vacuum, taking control of the city of Kirkuk and other northern areas long claimed by the Kurdistan Regional Government but until then outside its formal control. In these disputed areas, Kurdish forces under the regional government spearheaded a "concerted campaign" to displace Arab communities in northern Iraq, actions that could amount to war crimes, according to a report by Amnesty International.

Al-Maliki's government was widely blamed for the failure of the security forces and for Sunni Arab dissatisfaction with the central government, and international and domestic calls for a new prime minister became widespread. On 1 July, Kurdish president Masoud Barzani announced his intention to call a referendum on independence sometime in 2014 on the grounds that the country had been "effectively partitioned" already.

In September 2014, after Maliki was replaced as prime minister by Haider al-Abadi, Kurdish leaders agreed to postpone the referendum while they focused on the fight against ISIL.

On 3 February 2016, Rudaw.net reported that Kurdistan President Masoud Barzani told KRG legislators that the referendum would be held sometime before the 2016 United States presidential election in early November. On 23 March, Barzani said, in an interview with Al-Monitor media website, that the referendum would take place before October 2016. However, in late October, Prime Minister of Kurdistan Region Nechirvan Barzani confirmed that the referendum would not be held until after Mosul had been liberated.

In August 2016, Haider Al-Abadi said that he saw self-determination as an "undisputed right".

News reports from December 2016 said Kurdistan's Prime Minister Nechirvan Barzani had suggested the region could push for independence from Baghdad once the ongoing battle to liberate Mosul from ISIL was complete.

In early April 2017, as the liberation of Mosul was progressing, the ruling political parties of Kurdistan Region, the KDP and PUK, announced their goal of holding an independence referendum in 2017.

On 7 June 2017, Kurdish President Masoud Barzani announced that the referendum would take place on 25 September 2017. Barzani's assistant Hemin Hawrami said the referendum will also take place in Kirkuk, Makhmour, Sinjar and Khanaqin regions. All of these areas are disputed and are claimed by the central government. Senior Kurdish official Hoshyar Zebari said a "Yes" vote in the referendum would not mean an automatic declaration of independence of Kurdistan, but will "strengthen the Kurds' hand" in talks on self-determination with the central government.

On three separate occasions, Assyrians from Alqosh protested against the removal of their mayor by the KDP-dominated Nineveh Provincial Council. The residents of Alqosh rejected the idea of their town being a "disputed area" and demanded the immediate reinstatement of their former mayor. The removal, which occurred two months before the referendum, caused protests because the mayor was replaced by a KDP member from Alqosh.

On 14 August, a delegation from the KRG met with Prime Minister Abadi and Vice-President Maliki in Baghdad to discuss the upcoming referendum and affairs between the KRG and Iraq. Romeo Hakkari, the Assyrian representative of the delegation and head of the Bet-Nahrain Democratic Party said that in addition to the meeting with Iraqi officials, they would meet with foreign missions in Baghdad.

The KRG said referendum planning and implementation of the vote was up to the local councils of the disputed regions. The Shingal District Council expressed its support on 30 July for the KRG's efforts to include the Shingal area in the referendum. The Mayoral Council of Khanaqin on 16 August discussed the issue and decided to hold the referendum in their region. The Bashiqa Town Council voted the next day and decided to take part in the referendum.

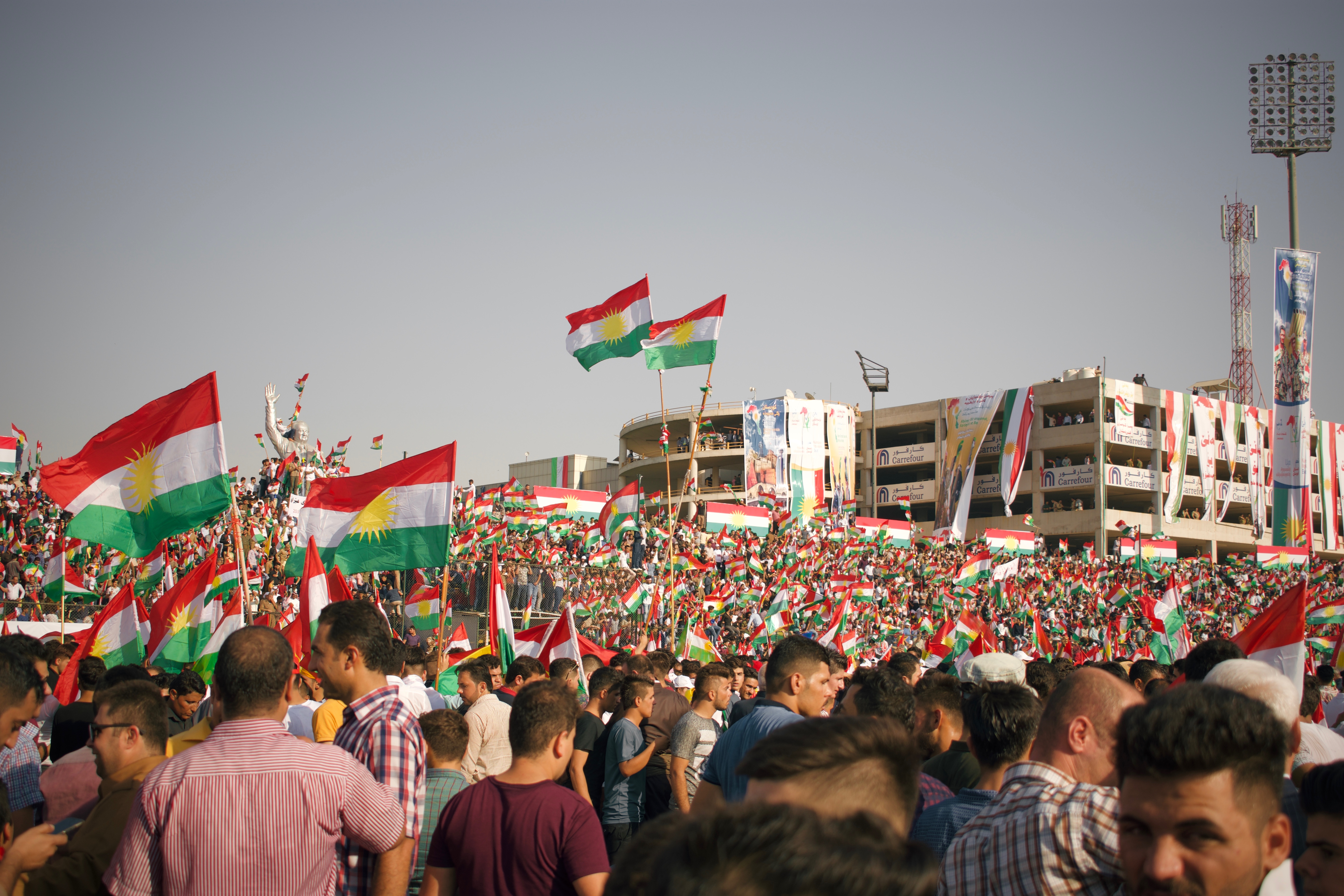
Pro-Kurdistan independence rally in Erbil, Iraqi Kurdistan, 22 September 2017

After a rare high-level meeting between the Iranian military chief of staff Major General Mohammad Bagheri and Turkish President Recep Tayyip Erdoğan in Ankara on 16 August, a joint statement "voiced strong opposition" to the referendum.

The local council of Mandali, whose population includes both Arabs and Kurds, had voted in favour of including the town in the referendum on 17 August. Arab residents however protested against the decision on 10 September. A day later, the city council withdrew the decision of participation in the referendum while Mandali's mayor, Hoshiya Ismail, was dismissed from his position.

On 29 August, the Kirkuk Provincial Council voted on the issue of holding the referendum in Kirkuk. Of the 41 council members, 24 attended with 23 voting in favor of holding the referendum while one abstained. The remaining 17 members, all of whom were Turkmen and Arabs, boycotted the vote. On 14 September, the Iraqi parliament voted to dismiss Najmiddin Karim as the Governor of Kirkuk, a decision requested by al-Abadi after Kirkuk's provincial assembly voted to take part in the referendum. Karim said he will not follow the dismissal order and will stay in office. The provincial council meanwhile condemned the decision of the parliament with council head Ribwar al-Talabani claiming only the council had the power to remove him.

Campaigning for the referendum officially began on 5 September. The region's electoral commission said campaigning would last for 18 days with the Iraqi Kurdish diaspora being able to vote on 23 September, two days ahead of the main poll.

The Iraqi parliament rejected the referendum on 12 September. The Kurdistan Region Parliament approved a plan to hold the referendum on 15 September. 68 out of 111 lawmakers attended the session with Gorran boycotting it. Iraq's Supreme Court on 18 September ordered the suspension of the referendum to examine its constitutionality. Barzani however vowed to go ahead with the referendum.

=== Media coverage ===
VOA report about a rally ahead of the vote

It has been reported that pro-AKP news outlets in Turkey including Yeni Akit, Akşam, Internet Haber and Yeni Safak have been circulating a fake news story about "Zionist support" for an "insidious Kurdish plan" by Barzani and Kurdish Jews to settle 200,000 Jews in the region should Kurdistan become independent. The report has been disputed, including by Kurdish analysts, as baseless and fake news, and has been described as part of a media offensive by Turkey against Israel, while Kurdish analyst Diliman Abdulkader considers the reports an attempt to "destroy Kurdish credibility in the region by associating them with Israel and playing on local prejudices against people of Jewish faith".

Turkey decided to remove broadcaster Rudaw Media Network (Rudaw), which is affiliated to the Kurdistan Regional Government (KRG) in northern Iraq, from its satellite broadcasting on the same day voting took place on the independence referendum in the KRG.

=== Polling ===
One poll, held between 25 and 27 August, which covered the provinces of Erbil, Sulaymaniyah, Duhok, Halabja and Kirkuk, as well as the cities of Khanagin, Jalawla and Mandali within Diyala, showed intention to vote yes at 52.9%, intention to vote no at 25.6%, 3.6% not voting and the remainder of 17.9% being undecided with most of these indicating that they intended to vote yes but were also carefully watching the situation in case it deteriorated.

== Ballot ==
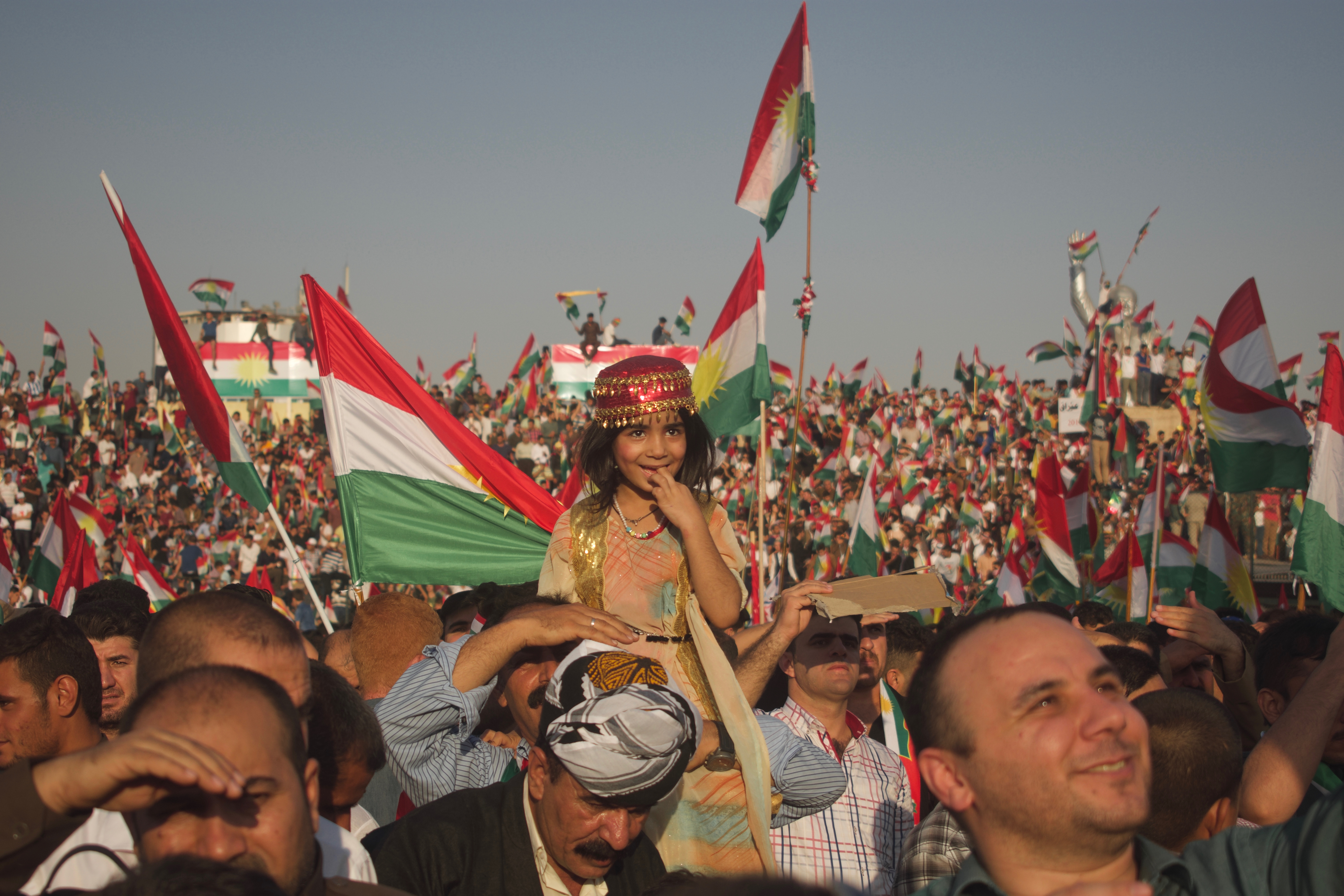
Pro-independence rally in Erbil in September 2017

The ballot was available in Kurdish, Arabic, Turkish and Assyrian. The Rudaw Media Network translated the ballot question to English as "Do you want the Kurdistan Region and the Kurdistani areas outside the Region to become an independent state?"

Ballot question
Kurdish	ئایا دەتەوێ هەرێمی كوردستان و ناوچە کوردستانییەکانی دەرەوەی هەرێم ببێتە دەوڵەتێکی سەربەخۆ؟
Kurdish	Aya detewê herêmî Kurdistan u nawçe Kurdistaniyekanî derewey herêm bibête dewlletêkî serbexo?
Arabic	هل تريد أن يصبح اقليم كوردستان و المناطق الكوردستانية خارج الاقليم دولة مستقلة؟
Arabic	Hal turīd an yaṣbaḥ iqlīm kūrdistān wal-manāṭaq al-kūrdistānīyah khārij al-iqlīm dawlah mustaqillah?
Turkish	Kürdistan Bölgesi ve bölge idaresinin dışında kalan Kürdistanlı yörelerin bağımsız devlet olmasını istiyor musunuz?
Assyrian	ܐܵܪܵܐ ܒܥܹܐ ܐܵܢܬ ܕܐܸܩܠܹܝܡܵܐ ܕܟܘܼܪܕܸܣܬܵܢ ܘܦܸܢ̈ܝܵܬ݂ܵܐ ܟܘܼܪ̈ܕܸܣܬܵܢܵܝܹܐ ܠܒܼܲܕܲܪ ܡܕܲܒܪܵܢܘܼܬ݂ܵܐ ܕܐܸܩܠܹܝܡܵܐ ܕܦܲܝܫܝܼ ܐܲܬ݂ܪܵܐ ܫܲܠܝܼܛ ܒܝܵܬܼܵܐ؟
Assyrian	Ārā bʿē ānt d'eqlēymā d'kūrdestān w'penyāṯā kūrdestānāyē l'ḇadar mdabrānūṯā d'eqlēymē d'payši aṯrē šaliṭ b'yāṯā?

== Party stance ==
Parties represented in Kurdistan Region Parliament
Choice	Party		Seats	Leader	Political position	Ref.
Yes	KDP	Kurdistan Democratic Party	38	Masoud Barzani	Big tent	
Yes	PUK	Patriotic Union of Kurdistan	18	Jalal Talabani	Third way	
Yes	KIU	Kurdistan Islamic Union	10	Salaheddine Bahaaeddin	Far-right	
Yes	KSDP	Kurdistan Socialist Democratic Party	1	Mohammed Haji Mahmoud	Centre-left	
Yes	KCP	Communist Party of Kurdistan – Iraq	1	Kamal Shakir	Far-left	
Yes	KTP	Kurdistan Toilers' Party	1	Balen Mahmoud	Left-wing	
Yes	KIM	Kurdistan Islamic Movement	1	Erfan Ali Abdulaziz	Right-wing	
Yes	TDL	Turkmen Development List	2	Mohammad Sadaddin	Centre-right	
Yes	CSAPC	Chaldean Syriac Assyrian Popular Council	2	Sarkis Aghajan	Centre-right	
Yes	ETL	Erbil Turkmen List	1		Minority rights	
Yes	KIG	Kurdistan Islamic Group	6	Ali Bapir	Center-right	
Yes	Gorran	Gorran Movement	24	Omar Said Ali	Center	
No	ITF	Iraqi Turkmen Front (Would support referendum if conditions were met)	1	Arshad al-Salihi	Right-wing	
No	ADM	Assyrian Democratic Movement (Against referendum being held in the Nineveh plain)	2	Yonadam Kanna	Minority rights	

== Official reactions to the referendum ==
=== UN member states ===
==== Iraq and regional countries ====
===== Iraq =====
- Iraq: Saad al-Hadithi, a spokesman for the Iraqi Prime Minister, said, "Any decision concerning the future of Iraq must take into account the constitutional provisions, it is an Iraqi decision and not one party alone. All Iraqis must have a say in defining the future of their homeland. No single party can determine the future of Iraq in isolation from the others."

===== Supporting =====
- Israel: Prior to the referendum, Israel's prime minister Benjamin Netanyahu said that Israel "supports the legitimate efforts of the Kurdish people to achieve their own state". Israel became the first state to endorse an independent Kurdistan.

===== Opposing =====
- Azerbaijan: A spokesman for Ministry of Foreign Affairs said in a statement, "The Republic of Azerbaijan recognizes and fully supports the territorial integrity and sovereignty of the Republic of Iraq. Azerbaijan supports the peaceful resolution of matters between the Central Government of Iraq and Iraq Kurdistan Regional Government within the territorial integrity and sovereignty of Iraq through the mutual understanding and dialogue."
- Australia: A spokeswoman for the foreign affairs department said in a statement, "Holding a referendum at this time risks causing further instability in Iraq that would weaken both the Iraqi government and the Kurdistan regional government."
- China: Foreign Ministry spokesman Lu Kang expressed support of Iraq's territorial integrity but asked for an open dialogue in a daily news briefing.
- France: President Emmanuel Macron said, "If this referendum is held, I hope it leads to the proper representation of Kurds in government and within the framework of the [Iraqi] Constitution." After the referendum, Macron offered to help ease tensions between the Iraqi and Kurdistani governments, stating that "[Iraq]'s territorial integrity is essential".
- Germany: Germany warned against Kurdistan making a unilateral decision in a "one-sided" referendum.
- Iran: In June 2017, the Iranian government said that the unilateral referendum was inconsistent with the Iraqi constitution and that "the Islamic Republic of Iran's principled and clear stance is supporting Iraq's territorial integrity and coherence". The Supreme Leader of Iran Ali Khamenei then said, "Iran opposes holding talks of a referendum to partition Iraq and considers those who fuel the idea as opponents of Iraq's independence." In early October 2017, during Turkey's president visit to Tehran, Iran's Supreme Leader Ali Khamenei called Iraqi Kurds' "secession vote an act of betrayal toward the entire region and a threat to its future" and urged Iran, Turkey, and Iraq to act decisively to prevent Kurdistan's independence. Khamenei also accused the United States of "seeking to create a new Israel in the region" by supporting the independence vote in Iraq.
- Saudi Arabia: The Ministry of Foreign Affairs said through the Saudi Press Agency, "[Saudi Arabia] looks to the wisdom of President Barzani in not holding the referendum."
- Spain: The Spanish Foreign Ministry released a statement saying "This referendum is illegal in accordance with the Iraqi constitution of 2005, which received broad support from the population. Now all the people of Iraq must join forces to defeat ISIL once and for all, to build the country for the benefit of the entire population."
- Syria: Adviser to the Council of Ministers Said Azzouz said any unilateral action is rejected and that Syria cannot accept the division of Iraq, and that independence needed legal provisions from the Iraqi constitution.
- Turkey: In June 2017, the Ministry of Foreign Affairs of Turkey said that the Iraqi Kurdish Regional Government's decision to hold an independence referendum was a "grave mistake". Also in June, president Recep Tayyip Erdoğan said the referendum would not serve anyone's interests, calling it a threat to the territorial integrity of Iraq, and expressed regret over it. On 14 September, the Foreign Ministry of Turkey threatened Kurdistan that it would "pay dearly" if the referendum was not abandoned. On 26 September, Erdoğan called the referendum decision "treachery" and said economic and military measures could be used against the Iraqi Kurds. Turkey halted the flights of the Turkish airline companies to northern Iraq from the evening of 29 September 2017, until further notice at the request of Baghdad, following the referendum.
- United Kingdom: On behalf of the British government, British consul to Kurdistan Region Frank Baker said the United Kingdom recognizes "the inalienable right of everybody around the world to be free and to decide on their own governments", but that it is not the right time for this. He said a referendum should be held with Iraqi consent. Secretary of State for Foreign and Commonwealth Affairs Boris Johnson echoed the position, stating that "a referendum at this time will distract from the more urgent priorities of defeating Daesh, stabilizing liberated areas and addressing the long-term political issues that led to Daesh's rise".
- United States: US State Department spokeswoman Heather Nauert said: "We support a unified, stable and a federal Iraq. We appreciate and understand the legitimate aspirations of the people of the Iraqi Kurdistan." Nauert warned that the referendum could distract from the final defeat of ISIL. She said: "We have expressed our concerns to the authorities in the Kurdistan Region, but holding a referendum or even a non-binding resolution at this time would distract from urgent priorities and that be the defeat of ISIS, the stabilization, the return of displaced people, managing of the region's economic crisis, and resolving the region's internal political disputes."

===== Neutral =====
- Belgium: In an interview with NRT News after meeting Deputy Prime Minister of KRG Qubad Talabani, Deputy Prime Minister of Belgium Jan Jambon said all nations have the right to self-determination. Belgian ambassador to Iraq Hendrik Van de Velde said Belgium did not have an official stance on this issue.
- Bulgaria: Bulgarian Prime Minister Boyko Borisov said Bulgaria had listened to President Barzani when he visited the country in May 2017, but had no official stance on this issue.
- Canada: Prime Minister Justin Trudeau remained neutral about the referendum process and did not get involved, citing the Quebec sovereignty issue. Trudeau said he is sensitive to other countries getting involved in another country's internal decisions and that he will respect the process established by the Kurds.
- Jordan: Jordanian Foreign Minister Ayman Safadi said the referendum was an internal Iraqi affair.

==== Other states ====
- Armenia: Armenian Foreign Affairs Ministry Eduard Nalbandyan said it hopes for a peaceful settlement of the situation in connection with the Kurdish referendum on independence. He also states that Armenia expects the Iraqi authorities and the regional authorities of Kurdistan to be able to avoid tension, and find avenues for resolving the matters.
- Greece: Greek Foreign Minister Nikos Kotzias said Iraq's unity should be desired by the people themselves and that the Kurdish referendum is a right under the Iraqi constitution. During a meeting discussing the upcoming referendum, Greek Ambassador to Iraq Dionyssios Kyvetos announced that Greece was upgrading its diplomatic representation in Erbil to a consulate.
- Ireland: Dublin South-West Teachta Dála and Sinn Féin Foreign Affairs spokesman Seán Crowe issued a statement saying "The people of Iraqi Kurdistan have the right to self-determination and the right to democratically decide their own future." He said the referendum "should lead to future discussions with Baghdad". Crowe criticized Iraq for suspending flights to and from Erbil and also criticized Iraq and its neighbors for threatening blockades against Kurdistan.
- Netherlands: Dutch Consul General to Kurdistan Region Janet Alberda said the referendum would be more accepted, if it was coordinated with Baghdad.
- Poland: Deputy Marshal of the Sejm Stanisław Tyszka said Poland would approve the referendum. Foreign Minister Witold Waszczykowski said he "perfectly understand the ambitions of Kurds", but urged Kurdish officials to cooperate with others.
- Russia: Russian President Vladimir Putin commented on the issue by stating that Russia understands the sensitivity around the Kurdish cause and that their position is that the referendum should be within international law.
- Sweden: Both governmental parties, the Social Democratic Party and the Green Party, have expressed their support for the referendum. Opposition parties Sweden Democrats and the Left Party have also expressed their support.

=== Other political entities ===
- Catalonia: Artur Mas, leader of the Catalan European Democratic Party and former president of Catalonia, said that he supported Kurdistan's bid for independence and applauded Kurdistan's leadership for "defending democracy". A Catalan independence referendum happened on 1 October 2017, just 6 days after the Kurdish referendum.
- Kosovo: Visar Ymeri, the leader of the largest opposition party Vetëvendosje, said: "Nobody has the right to deny the Kurdish people their will of being free and living in freedom and peace in solidarity with the other peoples of the world."
- Republic of Artsakh: The Ministry of Foreign Affairs of the Republic of Artsakh said it welcomes the results of the independence referendum.

==== Regional actors ====
- The Kurdish Islamist parties of Iraqi Kurdistan supported the independence, stating that it was their "national and religious right".
- Assyrian Democratic Movement: ADM has rejected the Kurdish referendum in the disputed area of the Nineveh Plain and instead calls for an Assyrian self-governed province part of Iraq.
- Bet-Nahrain Democratic Party: Romeo Hakkari, leader of the Bet-Nahrain Democratic Party, has come in support for a Kurdish independent state while also maintaining a strong stance for a Christian-governed province in the districts of Tel Keppe, Al-Hamdaniya and Al-Shekhan in the Nineveh Plain. He insists that there should be a separate referendum or option to elect for a Nineveh Plains province in the disputed area.
- Chaldean Syriac Assyrian Popular Council: Loay Mikhael, a representative from the CSAPC, said the council was supportive of the referendum as the Kurds have a right to self-determination. The council also calls for an Assyrian governed province in the Nineveh Plain to geographically join the KRG.
- Iraqi Communist Party expressed support for the referendum and said it is "a fundamental right of the Kurdistan Region" to hold a referendum and hopes for Iraqi support.
- The Chieftain of the Arab tribe Jubur in Kirkuk has expressed support for the referendum and urged members of the tribe to vote yes.
- Iraqi Turkmen Front said, "The referendum decision is clearly against the constitution. In addition, the participation of non-Kurdish regions in the referendum is unilateral and the Arabs', Turkmens' decisions are against the wishes of the Kurds." The Iraqi Turkmen Front said it would not recognize the referendum. Iraqi Turkmen leader Arshad al-Salihi said: "Holding this referendum at such a sensitive time is dangerous, the ITF is deeply concerned about this. The Kurds could end up forfeiting the significant political and military gains they have achieved in recent years. Kurdish political parties don't even seem to agree on the issue, while Kurdistan Islamic Group, along with the Movement for Change oppose the referendum altogether."
- Kurdistan Workers' Party: Cemîl Bayik: "Referendum is a democratic right, no one should stand against it."
- President of the Iraqi National Accord Ayad Allawi warned Kurdistan Region "not to ponder separation".
- Palestine Liberation Organization Secretary General Saeb Erekat is opposed to Kurdish self-determination: "Kurdish independence would be a poisoned sword against the Arabs." Taysir Khalid, member of DFLP and Executive Committee of the PLO, stated that the comparison between Kurdistan and Israel is "unjust", in reference to Nouri al-Maliki who said that Kurdistan will be a "second Israel" in northern Iraq.
- The left-wing Peoples' Democratic Party in Turkey supported the referendum.

== Results ==
=== Totals ===
Choice	Votes	%
For	2,861,471	92.73
Against	224,464	7.27
Total	3,085,935	100.00
Valid votes	3,085,935	93.35
Invalid/blank votes	219,990	6.65
Total votes	3,305,925	100.00
Registered voters/turnout	4,581,255	72.16
Source: KHEC

92.73%	7.27%
Yes	No

== Aftermath ==
=== Immediate reaction from Kurdistan and Iraq ===
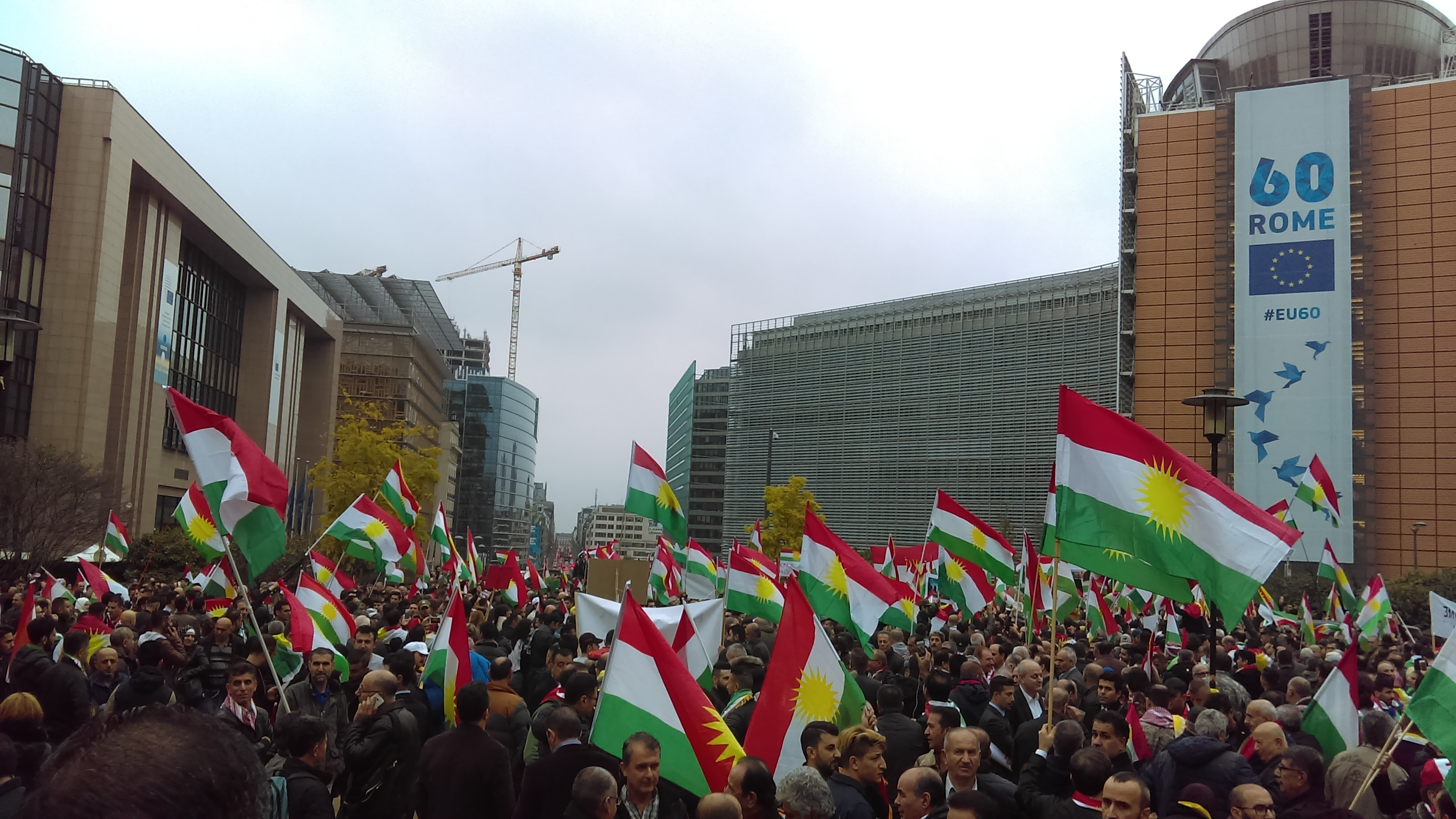
Demonstration in support of the independence of Kurdistan at Schuman in Brussels, Belgium, 25 October 2017

Following the referendum, wild celebrations erupted in Iranian Kurdistan and two days of pro-independence demonstrations, which included the singing of the anthem of the Republic of Mahabad and Kurdistan Region, occurred in the Kurdish cities of Baneh, Sanandaj and Mahabad, leading to mass arrests.

The Kurdistan Regional Government started making plans for state building and future negotiations with Iraq before a declaration of independence for the Republic of Kurdistan would be issued. Barzani created a new "political leadership" body to prepare for independence; however, three Kurdish parties, including the PUK, have refused to join it.

The Iraqi government threatened to send troops to Kirkuk, a city with rich oil deposits. Troops also blocked routes between Mosul and Dahuk on the day prior to the referendum.

Four days after the referendum, the Iraqi government stopped most international flights into the two international airports of Irbil and Sulaimaniya. Humanitarian, military and diplomatic flights were not included in the ban. This action followed Iraq's demand that the Kurdistan Regional Government hand over control of the airports.

Five days after the referendum, the Iraqi and Iranian governments announced that the Iraqi and Iranian armies would hold joint border drills at crossings on Iran's border with the autonomous Iraqi Kurdish region. Iranian tanks were deployed near the border with Kurdistan Region, but the move has been seen as mere posturing. Iran also closed its common border with the Kurdistan Region.

Kurdish businesses across Iraq suffered retaliatory attacks.

=== Iraqi–Kurdish conflict and Barzani steps down ===
On 15 October 2017, Iraqi forces launched an operation to take Kirkuk. While Iraqi state media reported that Iraqi units had initially encountered no opposition in taking areas near Kirkuk, the fall of Kirkuk gave impetus to capitulation across northern Iraq, with Baghdad-backed forces facing no resistance.

On 25 October 2017, in the light of avoiding the escalation of conflict with the Iraqi central government, Iraq's autonomous Kurdistan Region offered to "freeze" the result of September's referendum on independence and begin dialogue with Baghdad. A statement also proposed a ceasefire "in order to prevent further violence and clashes" triggered by the launch of an Iraqi military operation.

On 29 October 2017, Masoud Barzani announced his intentions to step down as President of Kurdistan Region, effective 1 November, after being in power for 12 years. His gamble of pushing through with the unofficial referendum ended with the disputed territories being recaptured by Iraq and with the Kurdish statebuilding project being left abandoned. Pro-Barzani protesters broke into the building across Iraqi Kurdistan and attacked lawmakers and journalists.

On 6 November, Iraq's Supreme Federal Court ruled that no Iraqi province was allowed to secede in order to preserve the unity of Iraq. The KRG announced it would respect the Supreme Federal Court's ruling, stating that "this decision must become a basis for starting an inclusive national dialogue between (Kurdish authorities in) Erbil and Baghdad to resolve all disputes".

== See also ==
- 2005 Kurdistan Region independence referendum (non-binding)
- Kirkuk status referendum
- Kurdish nationalism
- 2017 Catalan independence referendum
