= 2026 Kurdish–Iranian crisis =

Political and armed activity by Kurds in Iran

- Part of Kurdish separatism in Iran, the 2025–2026 Iranian protests and the 2026 Iran war
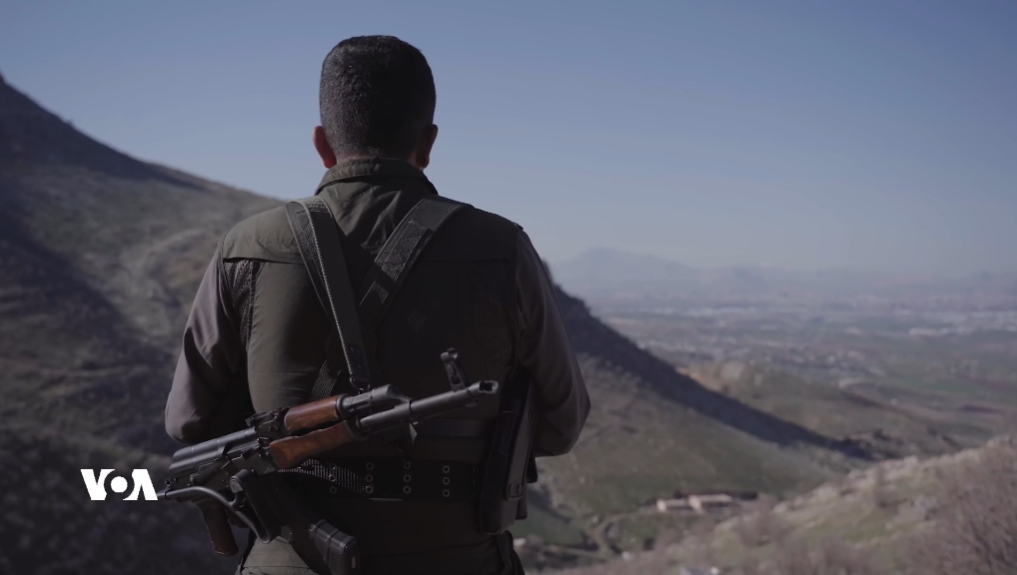
- A fighter of the Komala Party of Iranian Kurdistan in a camp in the Kurdistan Region of Iraq, March 2026
Date	5 January 2026 – present (10 months, 1 week and 3 days)
Location	Eastern Kurdistan, Iran and Kurdistan Region, Iraq
Status	Ongoing: January 2026, Iranian Kurdish parties declare general strike during the 2025–2026 Iranian protests and a limited insurgency breaks out; 22 February 2026, formation of the Coalition of Political Forces of Iranian Kurdistan; Iranian Kurdish parties call on the overthrowing of the Islamic Republic of Iran during the 2026 Iran war; Spillover into the Kurdistan Region of Iraq; Speculation about a Kurdish offensive, amid increased airstrikes in Iranian Kurdistan; Western Iran clashes (2026–present)

Belligerents
Coalition of Political Forces of Iranian Kurdistan (CPFIK); Kurdistan Democratic Party of Iran; Kurdistan Freedom Party; Kurdistan Free Life Party; Organization of Iranian Kurdistan Struggle; Komala of the Toilers of Kurdistan; Komala Party of Iranian Kurdistan; (Kurdistan Region) Sun of Hope	Iran; Muslim Peshmerga; Axis of Resistance; Popular Mobilization Forces; Islamic Resistance in Iraq; Saraya Awliya al-Dam

Casualties and losses
2026 Iran protests: 1 PAK fighter killed 2026 Iran war: 10 killed and a number injured (from aerial attacks)	2026 Iran protests: 6 killed and several injured (per Kurds); 9 killed (per Iran); 2026 Iran war: Large scale loses (from the air campaign in Iranian Kurdistan)
- 2026 Iran protests: 240–257 Kurdish protestors killed 2026 Iran war: 21 Kurdish civilians killed

The 2026 Kurdish–Iranian crisis refers to a period of intensified political and armed activity by Kurds in Iran, and parties representing them, to achieve some form of self-determination such as federalism in Iran. Major Iranian Kurdish parties called for general strikes during the 2025–2026 Iranian protests, which were largely observed by the Kurdish population, carried out limited insurgent operations, and formally united under the Coalition of Political Forces of Iranian Kurdistan (CPFIK), amid a period of political instability and weakening of the Islamic Republic of Iran. Subsequent war with the United States and Israel prompted attacks on Iranian Kurdish parties based in the Kurdistan Region of Iraq by Iran, while observers speculated about the potential for a broader Kurdish military offensive within Iran.

== Background ==
The Iranian–Kurdish conflict dates back to the early 20th century, including tribal uprisings and the rise of Kurdish nationalism, and culminated in 1946 when Qazi Muhammad declared the short-lived Republic of Kurdistan. After the republic's collapse, Iranian Kurdish parties continued to pursue autonomy or independence and were involved in several armed confrontations with Pahlavi Iran, which banned the Kurdish language and attempted to force assimilation into a Persian identity. Oppression continued under the Islamic Republic of Iran after it overthrew the monarchy in 1979. Ayatollah Khomeini proclaimed a "holy war" (jihad) against the Kurds in the aftermath of the revolution, which led to the murder of thousands of Kurds.

Over time, most of these parties were forced into exile in the Kurdistan Region of Iraq. From there, some participated in the war against the Islamic State, during which many were trained by US forces, carried out sporadic cross-border attacks into Iran, and were themselves targeted by Iranian missile and drone strikes in 2018 and 2022. They also maintained and trained their armed wings, received dissidents fleeing crackdowns during protests in Iran, such as the Mahsa Amini protests, while shifting their activities inside Iran toward political support. Iran has also sought to assert control over these groups, for example through a 2023 security agreement with Iraq that aimed to disarm them and relocate them away from border areas.

During the Twelve-Day War the previous year, Kurdish groups began organizing politically in anticipation of a potential power vacuum in Iran, but they did not launch any armed operations. ITV News reported that Israel and the United States of America started to smuggle weapons into Western Iran since the Twelve-Day War.

== Iranian Kurdistan during the 2025–2026 Iran protests ==
On 5 January 2026, several Iranian Kurdish parties issued a joint statement calling for a general strike to be held on 8 January in Kurdish areas during the 2025–2026 Iranian protests. Strikes were observed in more than 50 cities and towns, including in Kermanshah province, Kurdistan province, and West Azerbaijan province. In the Kurdish-majority areas of Abdanan and Malekshahi in Ilam province, described as among the centres of the protests, towns were reported to have "fallen into the hands of the protesters" after Iranian security forces abandoned their positions. This was seen as a major success for the Kurdish parties, demonstrating their influence and ability to mobilize people quickly and effectively, something not seen since the Mahsa Amini protests.

=== Limited insurgency ===
During the protests, the Kurdistan Freedom Party (PAK) claimed to have "played a role in the protests through both financial support and armed operations," coinciding with Iranian media reports accusing the group and other Kurdish factions of attacking Iranian forces.

On 10 January, according to PAK, its fighters injured three members of the Islamic Revolutionary Guard Corps (IRGC) in Nourabad, Lorestan Province, and also claimed to have killed six IRGC members in a separate incident. On 11 January, PAK claimed attacks in Kermanshah and Isfahan. On 13 January, PAK claimed another attack on an IRGC position in Kermanshah. The group regularly released photos and videos purportedly showing gunfire and buildings set ablaze. The Tasnim News Agency, which is close to the IRGC, stated that Kurdish groups including PAK had "entered the field phase" of the protests through coordinated actions. On 21 January, PAK reported that it had been targeted in retaliatory Iranian missile strikes following its operations.

Meanwhile, on 8 January, the Iran-linked Fars News Agency reported that clashes with the Kurdistan Free Life Party (PJAK) had killed eight IRGC members in Kermanshah, while in a separate incident a PJAK sniper allegedly killed a police officer in Ilam province.

=== Coordination among Iranian Kurdish parties ===
On 22 February 2026, the Coalition of Political Forces of Iranian Kurdistan (CPFIK), consisting of five major Iranian Kurdish parties based in the Kurdistan Region of Iraq, was formed. The alliance includes the Democratic Party of Iranian Kurdistan (PDKI), the Kurdistan Freedom Party (PAK), the Kurdistan Free Life Party (PJAK), the Organization of Iranian Kurdistan Struggle (Khabat), and the Komala of the Toilers of Kurdistan. The coalition described its aims as "toppling the Iranian regime" and achieving Kurdish self-determination in Iranian Kurdistan.

== Kurdish involvement in the Iran war ==
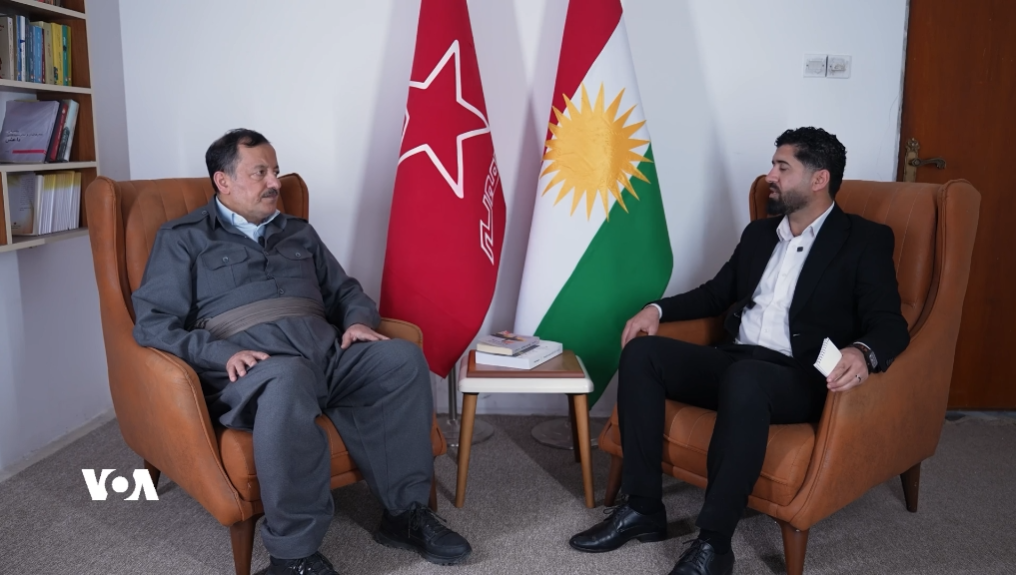
"We are preparing for a nationwide uprising and the Iranian regime is no longer able to defend itself," said Reza Kaabi, secretary general of the Komala of the Toilers of Kurdistan on 3 March 2025.

On 28 February, following the beginning of the 2026 Iran war, representatives of the Kurdish coalition stated that they were jointly coordinating political and military decisions and preparing for a new phase, claiming that their forces were "deep inside Iran" and along the Iran–Iraq border, ready to respond as the situation develops. On the other hand, the Iranian government began reviving the Muslim Peshmerga, which released statements mourning the death of Ali Khamenei and threatening US, Israeli, and the Kurdish opposition groups.

On 2 March 2026, in their first joint statement since its founding, the Kurdish coalition and its members addressed Iran's armed forces stationed in Kurdish areas, urging them to "separate themselves from the remnants of the Islamic Republic." The statement also called on the population to remain vigilant and coordinated, align political actions with the alliance's guidance, and protect public institutions and service facilities during what it described as a period of potential regime collapse and popular uprising. Analysts described the statement as a form of psychological warfare.

On 4 March, PJAK called on the people of Iranian Kurdistan to form "local governance committees" and "self-defense committees", to resist displacement by government forces and to stay away from their known whereabouts during the US–Israeli strikes.

On 6 March, Mohammad Saleh Qadri, a senior figure within the PDKI, stated that "a large force of ours is already in Iran" and that military action against the regime would begin "as soon as possible."

=== Strikes on the Kurdistan Region of Iraq ===
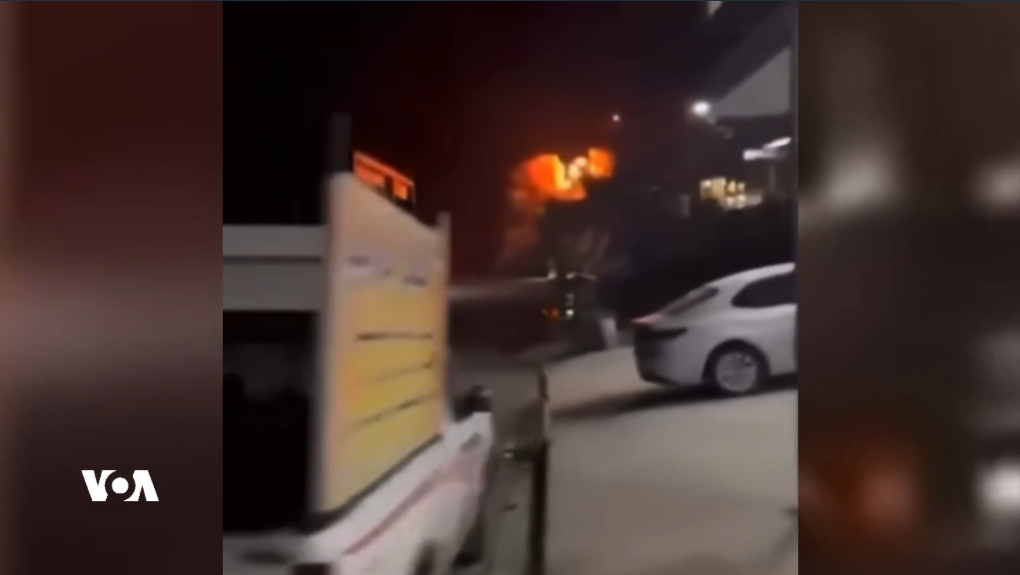
Blast in a residential area in the Kurdistan Region attributed to Iran and Iranian‑aligned militias in early 2026.

In what appeared to be a preemptive move, the Iranian army targeted positions of Iranian Kurdish parties in missile and drone strikes in the Kurdistan Region in Iraq. On 2 March, PAK announced that two of its bases in Erbil were targeted. The strikes led to the death of at least one PAK fighter.

On 6 March Iran threatened to target "all the facilities" of the Kurdistan region of Iraq if Kurdish militants were allowed to enter Iran by the authorities. Officials of the Kurdistan Regional Government (KRG) repeatedly stated that they did not want to become involved in the conflict and emphasized the need for de-escalation.

Wladimir van Wilgenburg argued that US air defenses had likely been expanded at the start of the war to cover areas used by Iranian Kurdish parties in the Kurdistan Region of Iraq, citing the relatively low casualty figures compared to the number of missiles and drones fired.

Despite the implementation of the 2026 Iran war ceasefire, Iranian Kurdish opposition groups in the Kurdistan Region continued to come under Iranian missile and drone attacks.

=== Alleged US and Israeli involvement ===
On 3 March 2026, The Wall Street Journal stated that US President Donald Trump was open to supporting armed militias, particularly Kurds. The reports coincided with intensified strikes in the Kurdish-majority areas of western Iran (Iranian Kurdistan) targeting police stations, border posts along the Iran–Iraq border, and other security facilities, which some sources suggested may have "paved the way for a Kurdish advance" and also hinted at a strategy built around the Kurds. The human rights organization Hengaw stated that the strikes had already resulted in the deaths of hundreds of Iranian security personnel in the Kurdish regions, which it said may have been "underreported". By 7 March, strikes in Iranian Kurdistan had destroyed 40 sites in Sanandaj and targeted additional locations in the cities of Kermanshah, Ilam, Mehran, Paveh, Kerend-e Gharb, Bukan, Mahabad, Oshnavieh, Saqqez, Sarpol-e Zahab, Miandoab, and Baneh, including IRGC barracks, intelligence, military and police bases, and several border guard commands. According to Hengaw, the extensive bombing of bases led IRGC and border guard forces in parts of Kermanshah province to evacuate to civilian locations including hospitals.

According to ITV News, since the start of last year, weapons have been smuggled into western Iran to arm thousands of Kurdish volunteers, and Kurdish sources have told the outlet that US and Israeli forces were asked to provide air cover when any such ground operation begins. These reports were corroborated by CNN, which stated that the CIA was working to arm Kurdish forces to spark an uprising in Iran. According to Axios, US and Israeli officials told the outlet that the idea of supporting Iranian Kurdish factions and using them as a force for a possible ground offensive from Iraq into Iran originated with Israeli Prime Minister Benjamin Netanyahu and the Mossad, with the CIA later joining the effort.

A few days after the start of the war, Trump held calls with Kurdish leaders of the Kurdistan Region of Iraq's two main parties, Masoud Barzani and Bafel Talabani, discussing what were described as "sensitive" topics, as well as with Mustafa Hijri, the leader of the PDKI. According to reporting by The Washington Post, Trump offered "extensive US air cover" and other backing to anti‑regime Iranian Kurdish groups to help them seize portions of western Iran, and in conversations with Kurdish leaders told them that the Kurds must choose a side "either with America and Israel or with Iran." Members of Kurdish opposition groups affirmed the plans, with one stating that "we can't move if the air above us is not cleared" and calling for a "no-fly zone" similar to the Iraqi no-fly zones, which helped Kurds in Iraq establish autonomy after 1991.

On 7–8 March 2026, after initially expressing support for Kurdish involvement, Trump said he did not want Kurdish fighters to enter the war in Iran, stating that the conflict was "complicated enough" and that he did not want to see Kurds "get hurt or killed." A report by Channel 12 in late March indicated that there were plans for a Kurdish offensive including all six major Kurdish factions, but numerous issues led the Mossad and the CIA to end the effort. One instance was aborted after the plans were leaked, with Iran fortifying defenses in response. The Military Intelligence Directorate of the IDF was reportedly skeptical of the plan. On 5 April, the Coalition of Political Forces of Iranian Kurdistan denied claims by Trump that it had received weapons originally intended for protesters in Iran. According to the Turkish-government-linked Daily Sabah, the Mossad armed Kurdish fighters with weapons seized from Hamas and Hezbollah, and ultimately, pressure from the Turkish government on Trump and the KRG stopped the US-backed offensive.

=== Disputed reports of clashes in Iranian Kurdistan ===
On 2 March 2026, a PDKI political analyst stated that the party's forces had targeted the Iranian state's military and security facilities, including missile facilities.

On 4 March, several US media outlets claimed a Kurdish-led ground offensive had begun, with Israeli-run i24NEWS stating that fighters from PJAK were moving into positions around the southern mountains of Marivan in the Kurdistan Province of Iran. No footage was provided, and the official cited was left unnamed. On 5 March, PJAK, PDKI, PAK and Komala denied that a Kurdish offensive in Iran had started. Aziz Ahmed, an official of Kurdistan Region in Iraq, stated that "not a single Iraqi Kurd has crossed the border." Channel 12 reporter Barak Ravid, who at first cited a US official confirming the offensive, later said there were "conflicting reports." The IRGC also rejected such reports as "subversive."

== See also ==
- Western Iran clashes (2016–2023)
- Federalism in Iran
- Iran–PJAK conflict
