= Iranian–Kurdish conflict =

Separatist dispute

- Part of spillover of Kurdish–Turkish, Iraqi–Kurdish, and Syrian–Kurdish conflicts
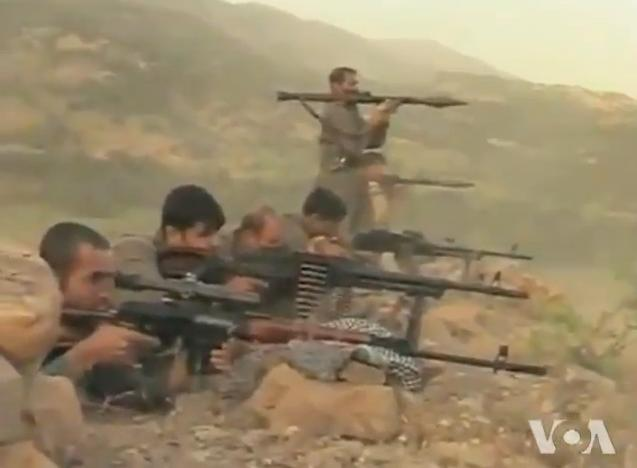
- PJAK fighters in 2012
Date	1918 – present (108 years) (main phase 1943 – present 83 years)
Location	Iran, Iran-Iraqi Kurdistan border areas For a map, see here
Status	Ongoing; Several tribal revolts during 1918–1943; 1946 attempt to establish the Republic of Mahabad; Political crackdown on Kurdish political associations in Iran; Ceasefire between Iran and PJAK established in September 2011, but fighting resumed in 2013; Renewed clashes between KDPI and Iranian military in 2016; Cross-border attacks by Iran on Iranian Kurdish opposition based in the Kurdistan Region of Iraq in 2018; 2022 bombing of Iranian Kurdish parties in the Kurdistan Region of Iraq, following their support for the Mahsa Amini protests; Renewed Kurdish–Iranian crisis in 2026; Western Iran clashes (2026–present)

Belligerents
Sublime State of Iran (1918–25)	Shekak tribesmen
Imperial State of Iran (1925–79)	KDPI; Republic of Mahabad (1945–46)
Interim Government and Council of the Islamic Revolution (1979): Islamic Republic of Iran (1979–present)	1979–96; KDPI; Komala; 2004–11; PJAK; 2016–22; KDPI; HDK; Komala–PIK; Komala–CPI; Komala–KTP; PJAK; PAK; 2022–; CPFIK (since 2026); PDKI; HDK (until 2022); PAK; PJAK; Eastern Kurdistan Units (YRK); Women's Defence Forces (HPJ); Khebat; Komala–KTP; Komala–PIK; Komala–CPI; Komala–RF; (Kurdistan Region) Sun of Hope; Anti-government protesters

Commanders and leaders
Ahmad Shah Qajar; (Iran) Reza Shah Pahlavi; (Iran) Mohammad Reza Pahlavi; (Iran) Ruhollah Khomeini # (1979–89); (Iran) Ali Khamenei (1981–2026) X; (Iran) Ebrahim Raisi(2021–2024); (Iran) Hassan Rouhani (2013–2021); (Iran) Mahmoud Ahmadinejad (2005–2013); (Iran) Mohammad Khatami (1997–2005); (Iran) Akbar Hashemi Rafsanjani (1989–1997); (Iran) Mohammad-Ali Rajai X; (Iran) Abolhassan Banisadr; (Iran) Qasem Soleimani X	Simko Shikak (1918–1930) X; Qazi Muhammad (executed); Mustafa Barzani; Jafar Sultan; Ahmed Barzani; (Soviet Union) Salahaddin Kazimov (1945–1946); Abdul Rahman Ghassemlou X; Sadegh Sharafkandi X; Foad Mostafa Soltani †; Sedigh Kamangar X; Abdullah Mohtadi; Haji Ahmadi (2004–2011); Majid Kavian †; Mustafa Hijri; Siamand Moeini; Zilan Vejin; Hussein Yazdanpanah; Mustafa Hijri; Khalid Azizi; Abdullah Mohtadi; Omar Ilkhanizade; Ibrahim Alizade; Siamand Moeini; Zilan Vejin; Hussein Yazdanpanah

Casualties and losses
Unknown	5,000 killed (1979–1996) (according to KDPI)
- 30,000 civilians killed (1980–2000) (according to KDPI); 15,000+ individuals killed (1946–present)

Kurdish–Iranian conflict or the Kurdish separatism in Iran is an ongoing separatist dispute between the Kurdish opposition in Western Iran and the governments of Iran since the emergence of Reza Shah in 1918.

The earliest Kurdish separatist activities in modern times refer to tribal revolts in today's West Azerbaijan Province of the Imperial State of Iran, which began during the interwar period. The largest of these revolts were led by Simko Shikak, Jafar Sultan and Hama Rashid. Many however, put the starting point of the organized Kurdish political-nationalist separatism at 1943, when Komala (shortly after the Kurdish Democratic Party of Iran) began their political activities in Iran with the aim to gain partial or complete autonomy in the Kurdish regions. Transformation from tribal to Kurdish political struggle in Iran took place in the aftermath of World War II, with the KDPI establishing the Republic of Mahabad during the 1946 Iran crisis. The USSR-supported attempt to establish a Kurdish state in Western Iran failed. More than a decade later, peripheral tribal uprisings launched with KDPI support throughout 1966–7. In the most violent episode of the conflict, more than 30,000 Kurds died in the 1979 rebellion and the consequent KDPI insurgency. Though the KDPI's armed struggle ended in late 1996, another Kurdish armed organization emerged in Iran by the early 2000s. The ongoing Iran-PJAK conflict started in 2004.

Though Iran has not been as brutal against its own Kurdish population as its neighbouring countries, it has always staunchly opposed Kurdish separatism.

== History ==
=== Tribalism and early nationalism ===
==== Simko's first revolt (1918–1922) ====
The Simko Shikak revolt was an armed Ottoman-backed tribal Kurdish uprising against the Qajar dynasty of Persia (Iran) from 1918 to 1922, led by Kurdish chieftain Simko Shikak. This tribal rebellion is sometimes regarded as the first major bid for establishing an independent Kurdish state in Persia, but scholars view the revolt as an attempt by a powerful tribal chief to establish his personal authority vis-à-vis the central government throughout the region. While elements of Kurdish nationalism were present in this movement, historians agree these were hardly articulate enough to justify a claim that recognition of Kurdish identity was a major issue in Simko's movement, and he had to rely heavily on conventional tribal motives. It lacked any sort of administrative organization and Simko was primarily interested in plunder. Historian Ervand Abrahamian describes Simko as "notorious" for massacring thousands of Assyrians and "harassing" democrats. Still, some Kurds today revere Simko as a hero of the independence movement.

==== 1926 Simko rebellion in Persia ====
By 1926, Simko had regained control of his tribe and begun another outright rebellion against the state. When the army engaged him, half of his troops defected to the tribe's previous leader and Simqu fled to Iraq.

==== Jafar Sultan revolt ====
Jafar Sultan of Hewraman region took control of the region between Marivan and north of Halabja and remained independent until 1925. After four years under Persian rule, the tribal leader revolted in 1929, but was effectively crushed.

==== Hama Rashid revolt ====
Hama Rashid revolt refers to a tribal uprising in Pahlavi Iran during the Second World War following the Anglo-Soviet invasion of Iran. The tribal revolt erupted in the general atmosphere of anarchy throughout Iran, with its main faction led by Muhammed Rashid. The first stage of the revolt revolt lasted from late 1941 till April 1942 and the second stage began in 1944, but ultimately resulted in Rashid's defeat. It has been considered as one of the leading factors of the establishment of the Kurdish political independence movement.

=== Political separatism ===
==== Mahabad crisis ====
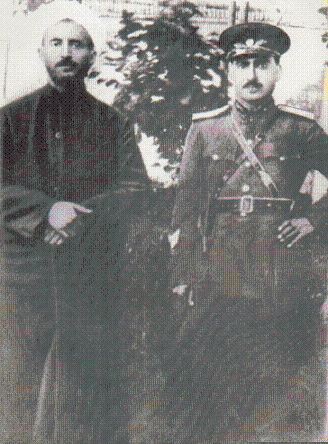
Qazi Muhammad and Mustafa Barzani during the 1946 events

The possibility of secession in modern Iran became evident shortly after the Second World War when the Soviet Union refused to relinquish occupied northwestern Iranian territory. Iran crisis of 1946 included a separatist attempt by the KDP-I and communist groups to establish a Soviet puppet government, and declare the Republic of Mahabad in Iranian Kurdistan (today's southern part of West Azerbaijan Province). It arose along with another Soviet puppet state known as the Azerbaijan People's Government. The state itself encompassed a very small territory, only including Mahabad and its adjacent cities. This state couldn't incorporate southern Iranian Kurdistan as it fell inside the Anglo-American zone and also failed to attract the tribes outside Mahabad to the nationalist cause. As a result, when the Soviets withdrew from Iran in December 1946, government forces were able to enter Mahabad unopposed. At least 1,000 died during the crisis.

Iran crisis of 1946 included an attempt of the KDPI to establish an independent Kurdish-dominated Republic of Mahabad in Iranian Kurdistan. Afterwards, Marxist insurgencies led by the KDP-I and Komala continued for decades, but these two organization never advocated for a separate Kurdish state or greater Kurdistan as did the PKK in Turkey. It was then when the Iranian government adopted the policy of exploiting divisions in the Kurdish community.

==== 1967 Kurdish revolt ====
During the mid-1960s, a series of Kurdish tribal disturbances erupted in Western Iran as they were fed up by the revival of the Kurdish Democratic Party of Iran (KDP-I). In 1967-8, Iranian government troops suppressed a Kurdish revolt in Western Iran, consolidating the previous Kurdish uprisings in the Mahabad-Urumiya region.

==== 1979 rebellion ====
The 1979 Kurdish rebellion in Iran was an insurrection led by the KDPI and Komala in Iranian Kurdistan, which eventually became the most serious rebellion against the new Iranian regime. The rebellion ended in December 1982, with 10,000 killed and 200,000 displaced.

==== 1989–1996 KDPI insurgency ====
Insurrection by the KDPI took place in Iranian Kurdistan throughout the early and mid-90s, fueled by the assassination of its leader in exile in July 1989. The KDPI insurrection ended in 1996, following a successful Iranian campaign of targeted assassinations of KDPI leaders and crackdown on its support bases in Western Iran. In 1996, the KDPI announced a unilateral ceasefire, and has since acted at a low profile before renewing clashes in 2015.

=== Twenty-first century ===
==== 2004 ====
PJAK insurrection

The Iran–PJAK conflict is an ongoing rebellion of PJAK in which hundreds of Kurdish militants and Iranian forces as well as civilians have died, officially beginning from April 2004. PJAK is based in the border area with Iraqi Kurdistan and is affiliated with the Marxist PKK from Turkey, though PJAK themselves tend to neglect this alleged relation. Although sometimes described as an organization demanding human rights for Kurds in Iran, it is regarded as a separatist organization by Iranian media and various Western analysts. The PJAK goal is an establishment of Kurdish autonomy and according to Habeeb, they do not intend to pose any serious threat to the regime of the Islamic Republic.

In one of the first actions of the Obama administration, PJAK was declared a "terrorist organization". PJAK and Iranian government agreed on a ceasefire deal following the 2011 Iranian offensive on PJAK bases. After the ceasefire agreement, a number of clashes between the PJAK and the IRGC took place in 2012, and by mid-2013, the fighting resumed in sporadic incidents, escalating in 2016.

PDKI call for federalism

In 2004, the Democratic Party of Iranian Kurdistan (PDKI) called for federalisation of Iran, "endors[ing] a federal system for a multi-national, multi-ethnic, and multi-religious Iran".

==== Renewed insurgency ====
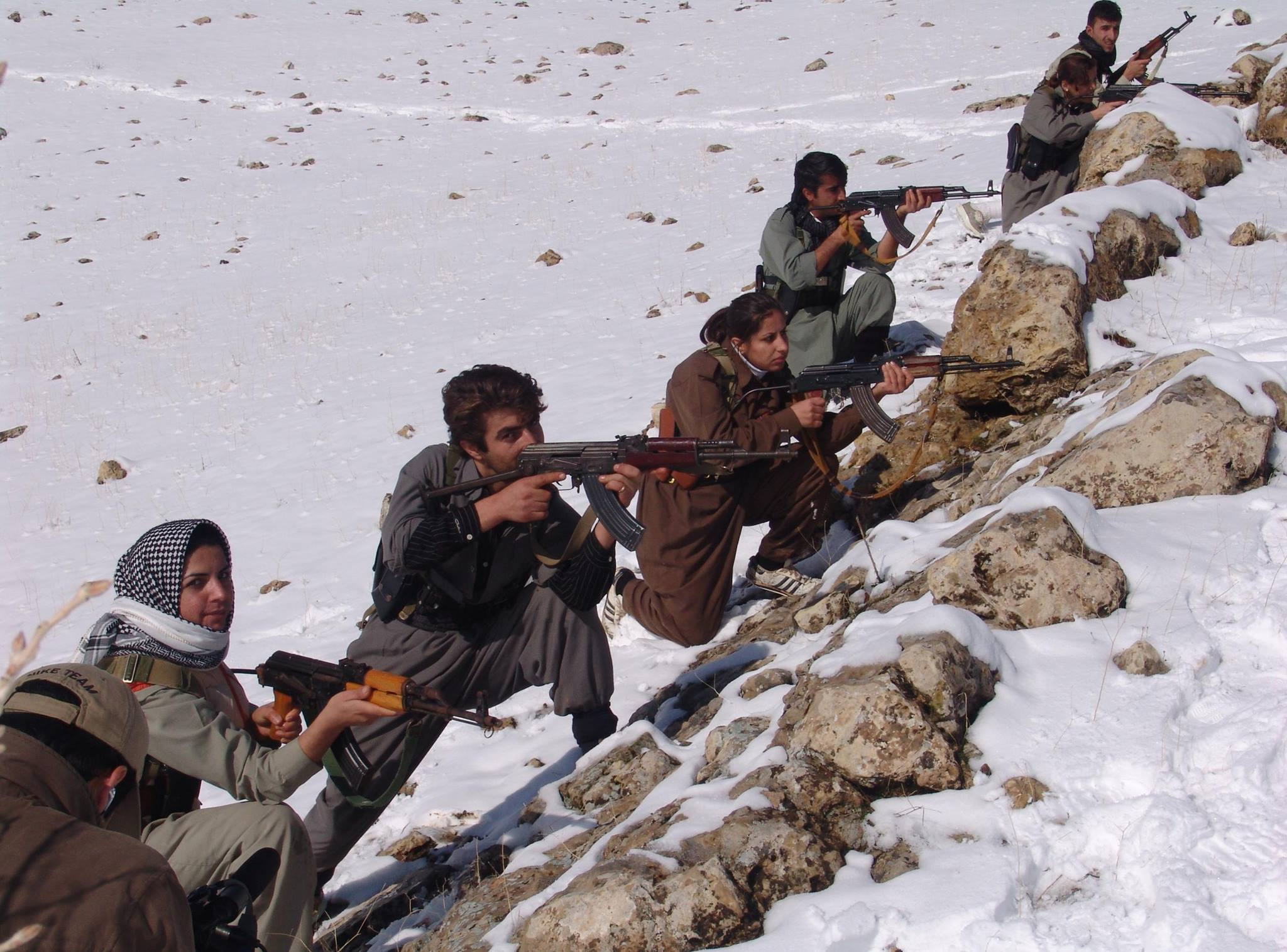
PDKI fighters.

In January 2014, Iranian forces killed a KDPI party member while he was disseminating leaflets.

In September 2014, the KDPI engaged Iranian security for the first time in many years, killing at least 6 Iranian soldiers. It was unclear whether this was a result of change of policy by the Democratic Party of Iranian Kurdistan (which avoided violence since 1996) or an isolated sequence of incidents.

In May 2015, a suspected Iranian attack (allegedly disguised as PKK fighters) on PJAK forces on the Iran–Iraqi Kurdistan border resulted in 6 killed—2 KDPI and 4 PKK (or allegedly Iranian agents).

On 7 May 2015, ethnic Kurds rioted in Mahabad, Iran, following the unexplained death of Farinaz Khosravani on 4 May 2015, a 25-year-old Kurdish hotel chambermaid. Unrest and violence spread to other Kurdish cities in Iran, such as Sardasht, where police clashed with hundreds of protesters on 9 May 2015, where one protestor was reportedly killed. Soran Khedri, a former PJAK official, stated that PJAK had attacked an Iranian checkpoint, killing two Iranian personnel. According to ARA sources, as of 11 May, the death toll rose to 6 protesters killed. The incidents prompted harsh responses from other Kurdish opposition parties, including the Kurdistan Freedom Party and the PDKI.

In June 2015, a KDPI attack on the Revolutionary Guard forces reportedly left 6 people dead.

==== Low-level insurgency (2016–2023) ====
Military clashes in West Iran refers to the ongoing military clashes between Kurdish insurgent party Democratic Party of Iranian Kurdistan (PDKI) and the Islamic Revolutionary Guard Corps (IRGC), which began in April 2016. The Kurdistan Freedom Party (PAK) and Komalah expressed their support to the Kurdish cause of PDKI as well, with both clashing with Iranian security forces in 2016 and 2017 respectively. In parallel, the leftist Iranian Kurdish rebel group PJAK resumed military activities against the IRGC in 2016, following a long period of stalemate.

The 2016 clashes came following a background of what the PDKI described as "a growing sense of discontent and alienation in Rojhelat". The commander of the PAK military wing described their engagement and declaration of hostilities against the Iranian government were due to the fact that "the situation in eastern Kurdistan (Iranian Kurdistan) has become unbearable, especially with the daily arbitrary executions of Kurds [in Iran]".

Iran has periodically launched strikes against the KDPI and other Iranian Kurdish dissident groups based in the frontier of the Kurdistan Region of Iraq. In March 2023, Iraqi Prime Minister Mohammed Shia' Al Sudani, who came to power via a coalition of Iranian-backed parties, signed a border security agreement with Iran to tighten up the frontier between the two countries. On 28 August, Iraq agreed to disarm and relocate these groups to camps near Mosul by 19 September. According to the New Arab, these groups were not disarmed as of October 2023, nor did Iraq seem to have the capability to do so.

==== 2026 Kurdish–Iranian crisis ====
In 2026, following the 2025–2026 Iran protests and subsequent United States military buildup in the Middle East, major Iranian Kurdish parties created the Coalition of Political Forces of Iranian Kurdistan (CPFIK), to "bring down the Islamic Republic of Iran and realize the Kurdish people's right to self-determination."

==== Western Iran clashes (2026–present) ====
Starting in early June 2026, new clashes broke out inside Iran between Kurdish opposition groups and the IRGC.

== See also ==
- Azerbaijani–Kurdish conflict
- Kurds in Iran
- Iranian Kurdistan
- Kurdish people
- KDPI–Komala conflict
- List of modern conflicts in the Middle East
- Kurdish–Turkish conflict
- Iraqi–Kurdish conflict
- Kurdish–Syrian conflict
- A Modern History of the Kurds by David McDowall
