= Coalition of Political Forces of Iranian Kurdistan =

Alliance of major Iranian Kurdish parties

Coalition of Political Forces of Iranian Kurdistan هاوپەیمانیی هێزە سیاسییەکانی کوردستانی ئێران Hevpeymaniya Hêzên Siyasî yên Kurdistana Îranê
- 2026–present
- Logo of the CPFIK
- Headquarters: Kurdistan Region of Iraq
- Type: Political and military alliance
- Membership: Founding members: Kurdistan Democratic Party of Iran (KDPI); Kurdistan Freedom Party (PAK); Kurdistan Free Life Party (PJAK); Organization of Iranian Kurdistan Struggle (Khabat); Komala of the Toilers of Kurdistan; Other members: Komala Party of Iranian Kurdistan
- Historical era: 2026 Kurdish–Iranian crisis
  - Founding during the 2025–2026 protests in Iran: 22 February 2026
  - 2026 Iran war: 28 February 2026
  - 2nd Western Iran clashes: 7 July 2026

The Coalition of Political Forces of Iranian Kurdistan (Note: Also known as Rojhelat Alliance/Coalition, Eastern Kurdistan Alliance/Coalition, Iranian Kurdistan Alliance/Coalition, or just Kurdistan Alliance/Coalition) (CPFIK; Kurdish: هاوپەیمانیی هێزە سیاسییەکانی کوردستانی ئێران, romanized: Hevpeymaniya Hêzên Siyasî yên Kurdistana Îranê) is an alliance of major Iranian Kurdish parties formed on 22 February 2026 in response to growing unrest in Iran and renewed conflict in Iranian Kurdistan.

Following the onset of the 2026 Iran war, the coalition declared its willingness to overthrow the Islamic Republic of Iran, with stated aims concerning both Iranian Kurdistan and the country as a whole. Subsequently, the Islamic Revolutionary Guard Corps (IRGC) targeted member parties of the alliance based in the Kurdistan Region of Iraq and strengthened its border security. The coalition was reportedly in talks with, or received support from, the United States and Israel at the beginning of the war, however, alleged media leaks and pressure from regional countries reportedly halted a proposed U.S.-backed offensive into Iran in March 2026.

Separately, some member parties of the alliance have engaged in clashes with the IRGC in western Iran since June 2026.

== History ==
=== Background ===
The alliance was preceded by the Cooperation Center of Iranian Kurdistan's Political Parties, formed in 2018, and the Dialogue Center for Cooperation Among the Parties of Iranian Kurdistan, established in 2023 in the aftermath of the Jina Mahsa Amini protests to jointly advance Kurdish political interests. Since early 2025, the Dialogue Center held monthly meetings, with the chairmanship rotating among participating parties. According to a statement issued after the alliance's formation, the Dialogue Center played a key role in its establishment by facilitating exchanges of opinions and coordination of activities.

Iranian Kurdish groups, part of the Dialogue Center, have been military targets for Iran, including during the September–October 2022 attacks on Iraqi Kurdistan. In 2023, Iraq and Iran signed a security agreement requiring Baghdad to disarm and relocate these groups from border areas following threats by Tehran.

On 5 January 2026, several Iranian Kurdish parties met under the auspices of the Dialogue Center in a high level meeting to coordinate a joint response to the 2025–2026 protests in Iran. Most Iranian Kurdish parties supported the protests and called for strikes. The strikes were observed in most Kurdish cities of Iran, including in Kermanshah Province, Kurdistan Province, and West Azerbaijan Province. During the protests, the Kurdistan Freedom Party (PAK) even claimed responsibility for multiple attacks on the Islamic Revolutionary Guard Corps (IRGC) and stated that it was targeted in retaliatory missile strikes.

On 12 February, seven Iranian Kurdish parties met to ratify a draft agreement and form a coalition of forces. The process was delayed after two parties refused to sign the document. The Dialogue Center decided to postpone the decision but stated that the five parties that had already signed could proceed with establishing the coalition in the coming days if the other two chose not to join.

On 20 February, The Jerusalem Post reported that the Iranian regime could attack Iranian Kurdish parties in the event of a war with the United States.

=== Founding ===
The alliance was founded on 22 February 2026.

In the following days, the Ahwazi Democratic Popular Front, the Broad Solidarity for Freedom and Equality in Iran, the Kurdistan National Congress (KNK), Yehuda Ben Yosef, President of the Jewish Kurdish Community in Israel, and the Democratic Union Party (PYD) congratulated the coalition on its establishment. However, the formation also drew hostile reactions from other groups. Reza Pahlavi accused the alliance of separatism, threatening military action if the current regime fell. In response, the alliance reaffirmed its commitment to Kurdish rights and called on "pro-freedom forces" to stand against authoritarianism.

=== 2026 Iran war ===
Following the 2026 Iran war, representatives of the coalition stated that they were jointly coordinating political and military decisions and preparing for a new phase, claiming that their forces were "deep inside Iran" and along the Iran–Iraq border, ready to respond as the situation develops. Some members claimed that their forces were already engaged in fighting the Iranian army, while their positions were simultaneously targeted by missile and drone strikes in the Kurdistan Region.

On 2 March 2026, in their first joint statement since its founding, the coalition and its members addressed Iran's armed forces stationed in Kurdish areas, urging them to "separate themselves from the remnants of the Islamic Republic." The statement also called on the population to remain vigilant and coordinated, align political actions with the alliance's guidance, and protect public institutions and service facilities during what it described as a period of potential regime collapse and popular uprising.

On 3 March, intensified attacks in the Kurdish‑majority areas of western Iran, including strikes on border posts along the Iran–Iraq border and other security facilities, were described by some analysts as having "paved the way for a Kurdish advance." This coincided with a call between US President Donald Trump and Mustafa Hijri, the leader of the Democratic Party of Iranian Kurdistan (PDKI), a founding member of the coalition.

On 9 March, the alliance's logo was approved.

On 5 April, the alliance denied claims by US President Donald Trump that it had received weapons originally intended for protesters in Iran.

== Members ==
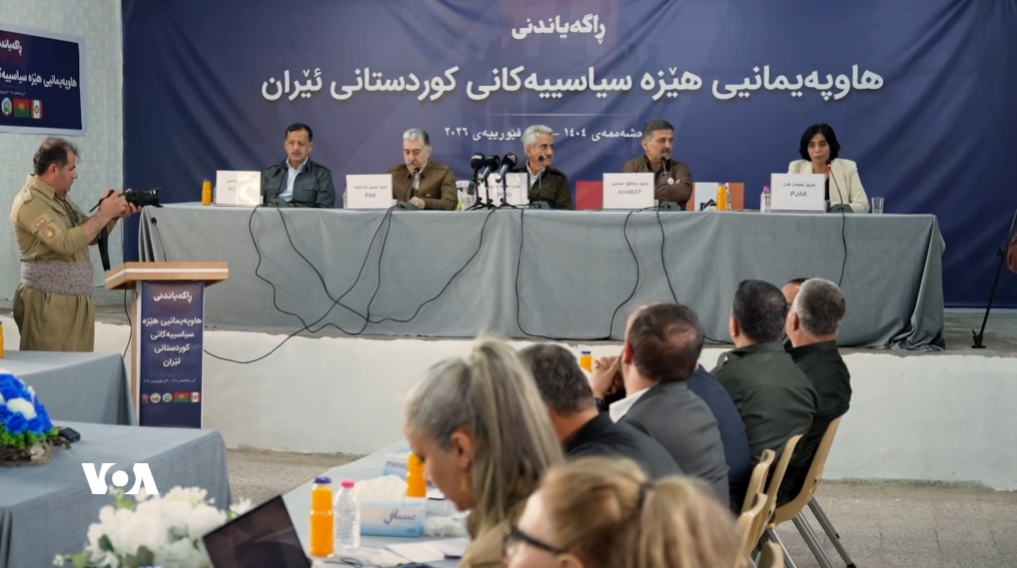
Founding conference of the coalition, 22 February 2026.

Its founding members include the five largest Iranian Kurdish parties, most of which are based in exile in the Kurdistan Region of Iraq. These include:

- Democratic Party of Iranian Kurdistan (PDKI)
- Kurdistan Freedom Party (PAK)
- Kurdistan Free Life Party (PJAK)
- Organization of Iranian Kurdistan Struggle (Khabat)
- Komala of the Toilers of Kurdistan

The following party leaders participated in the official press declaration and signed the agreement that formally established the alliance: Mustafa Hijri (PDKI), Hussein Yazdanpanah (PAK), Baba Sheikh Hosseini (Khabat), Viyan Peyman (PJAK), and Reza Kaabi (Komala of the Toilers of Kurdistan).

The Komala Party of Iranian Kurdistan, led by Abdullah Mohtadi, and the Komala Kurdistan's Organization of the Communist Party of Iran (CPI), initially refrained from signing the agreement, even though they had been part of the Dialogue Center. The Komala Party of Iranian Kurdistan did not sign the agreement, citing ambiguities and unclear objectives. However, it acknowledged some positive aspects, welcomed the unity promoted by the alliance, and called for a joint administration during a transitional period in Kurdistan, a unified "Peshmerga force", and coordinated international diplomacy. The party emphasized that it does not oppose the coalition.

Other members include:

- Komala Party of Iranian Kurdistan (joined the coalition on 4 March 2026 after initially holding off)

== Objectives and charter ==
=== Primary objectives ===
The primary objectives of the alliance are "the struggle to bring down the Islamic Republic of Iran, the realization of the Kurdish people's right to self-determination, and the establishment of a national and democratic institution based on the political will of the Kurdish nation in Eastern Kurdistan."

=== Provisions for Eastern Kurdistan ===
- Kurdish self-determination.
- Recognition of legitimate self-defense.
- Rejection and condemnation of internal violence.
- Formation of a joint diplomatic committee to coordinate external relations.
- Establishment of a joint command center for Peshmerga (KDPI, PAK, Khabat, Komala) and guerrilla (PJAK) forces.
- Separation of Eastern Kurdistan from Iran and establishment of a democratic administrative system in it.
- Administration of liberated areas through a central alliance management structure.
- Organization and supervision of free and democratic elections in Eastern Kurdistan following liberation.
- All member forces are to respect and accept the results of these democratic elections.
- Adoption of a flag to represent Eastern Kurdistan, with no opposition to the existing Kurdistan flag.

=== Provisions for Iran ===
- Democratization and secularization of Iran.

=== Other objectives ===
- Cooperation with other "oppressed nations" and opposition forces.
- Full gender equality.
- Supplementary provisions may be added.

== Military forces ==
Sky News estimated in early March 2026 that the parties in the coalition together had around 5,000 to 10,000 fighters, many of whom were battle-hardened during the war against the Islamic State or in previous clashes with Iran. Aftenposten estimated in early March that several hundred Kurds from the diaspora, particularly from Norway, joined Kurdish parties at the beginning of the 2026 Iran war. Sources within Kurdish groups state that if they were to cross the border from Iraq into Iran, clandestine networks and supporters inside the Kurdish regions of Iran could join them in securing the area.

== See also ==
- Coordinating Council of Ahwazi Organizations – an alliance of Ahwazi Arab groups formed in 2026
- Cooperation Center of Iranian Kurdistan's Political Parties – an Iranian Kurdish political alliance formed in 2018
- People's Fighters Front – a Baluch nationalist umbrella organization formed by several Iran-based Baluch separatist groups in late 2025
