= Abdulla Mohtadi =

Kurdish Iranian leftist politician and political analyst

Abdullah Mohtadi
- عەبدوڵڵا موهتەدی
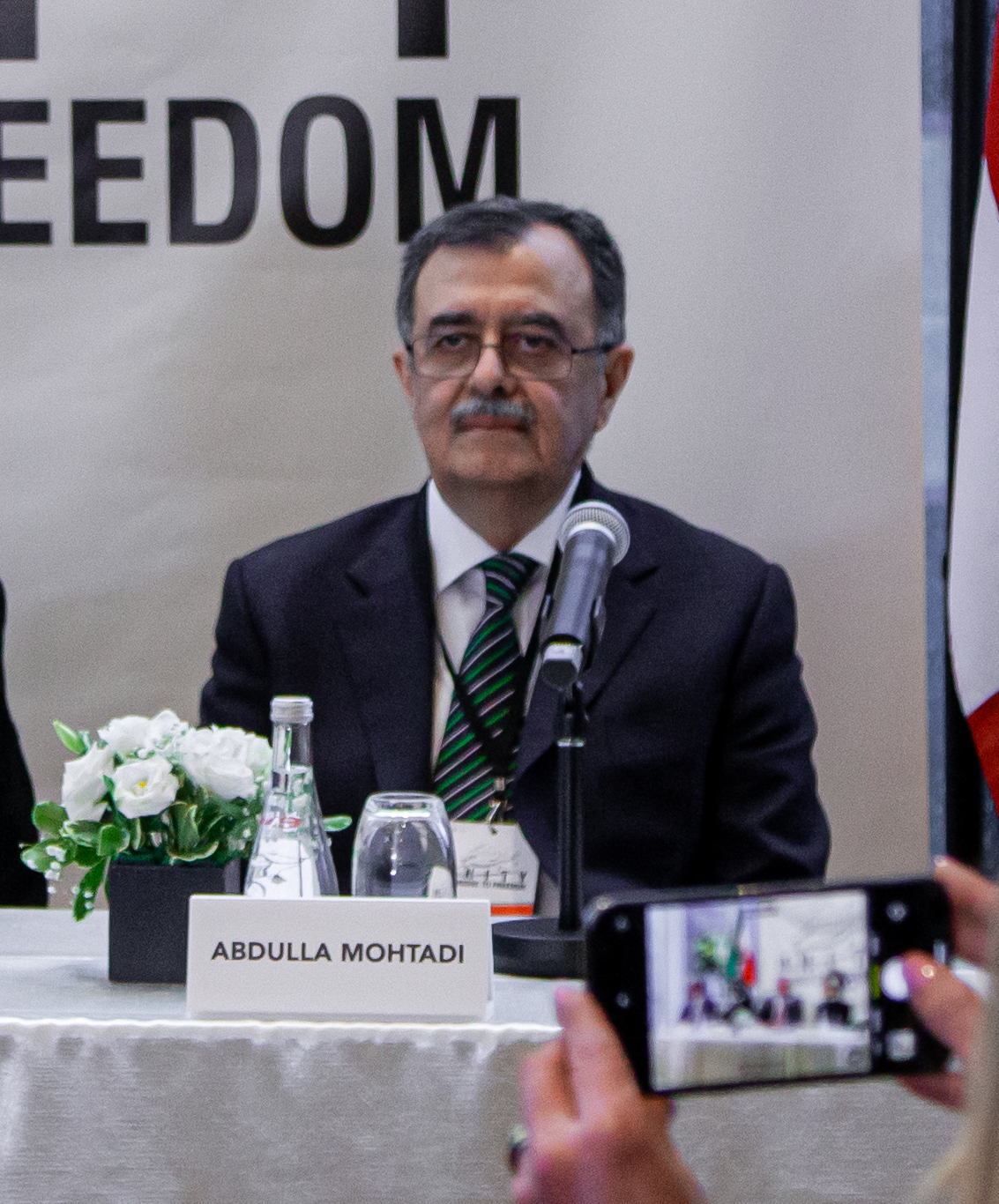
- Mohtadi at the "Unity: A Bridge for Freedom" event organized by the Alliance for Democracy and Freedom in Iran in 2023
- Born: 1949 (age 76–77); Bukan, Imperial State of Iran
- Other name: Shirko
- Occupation: Secretary General of the KPIK
- Years active: 1966
- Known for: Politics
- Political party: Komala Party of Iranian Kurdistan

Abdullah Mohtadi (Persian: عبدالله مهتدی; Sorani Kurdish: عەبدوڵڵا موهتەدی; born 1949) is the leader and secretary general of Komala Party of Iranian Kurdistan.

He was born in the city of Bukan, West Azarbaijan province, western Iran, and since starting his political career, has been playing a prominent role in the Kurdish resistance struggle against the Iranian regime. In the international media, Abdulla Mohtadi is known as a political analyst of the Middle East, especially ongoing affairs of Iran and Iranian Kurdistan. He is also a well-known political figure in Iran and Kurdistan whose political activity has lasted for more than 30 years.

Abdullah Mohtadi was one of the leaders of the seven-year civil war in Iranian Kurdistan. Within Komala, the party’s Central Committee described this war as a struggle against the other major Kurdish party in Iran, KDPI, for hegemony in Kurdistan and for leadership of the Kurdish revolutionary movement. Abdullah Mohtadi's ideas for a social-democratic Komala calls for a “democratic secular pluralist federal Iran,” civil liberties, human rights and above all, social democracy. This idea has focused on regime change in Iran rather than establishing a Kurdish state with concentration on forming a united front of all ethnic groups while mobilizing Iran's Kurdish population.

== Biography ==
=== Early life and family ===
Abdullah Mohtadi was born in Bukan in 1949 and moved to Tehran as a child at the request of his father. Mohtadi's father was a member of the Komala J.K and had been active in the party for a long time. After the establishment of the Republic of Mahabad, he was elected as Minister and after the defeat of the newly established government, the family moved to Tabriz, but shortly they decided to settle in Tehran, where the man of the family was teaching at the University of Tehran.

Mohtadi's family is known for its long active status in Kurdish politics. Growing up in a famous family for Abdullah was full of memories of being visited by many people, most of which were politicians, poets and writers all over of Iran and Kurdistan. The Mohtadi family was indeed an influential one with great wealth and stature. The father of the family, Haji Abdul Rahman aghai Ilkhanizadeh was a minister in the Kurdish Republic of Mahabad in 1946; he moved to Tehran when the Republic of Mahabad failed. in the 1950s he changed the family name to Mohtadi, teaching [Sunni] theology at the University of Tehran.

Before Mohtadi was born, political activity in Iran and Kurdistan was highly inflamed. In Kurdistan, the Republic of Mahabad was defeated and Qazi Muhammad, the leader of this republic, was executed and most of the politicians were already either executed or imprisoned and a few managed to escape to Iraqi Kurdistan. The Shah military power was able to take control of Kurdistan and as well as the neighboring region of Azerbaijan, where the Republic of Azerbaijan had suffered to the same fate as the Republic of Mahabad. With Mossadegh in office from 1951 until 1953, political activity became more open. Gradually, political activists were able to reach out to people working in Iraqi Kurdistan and revitalize their political bonds. This process continued until the king stood against the people with all his might and the fall of Mossadegh's government which implicated in to the disruption of the political activity in Kurdistan again.

Abdullah's father moved to Tehran when the Republic of Mahabad failed. Abdullah Mohtadi soon got his bachelor's degree in business from the University of Tehran. As a teenager, Mohtadi was very interested in poetry, but after a while, he turned to politics and in a short time he became one of the political figures of Iran, especially in Kurdistan. In the late 1960s, a revolutionary movement was launched in Iranian Kurdistan by some of the political activists of the time like Suleiman Moini, Ismail Sharifzadeh, Mala Aware and Mohtadi's family which was closely associated with the movement, especially his older brother, Salahadin. This movement had such a profound effect on the formation of Mohtadi's future that when it failed, he decided to continue the movement in alternate ways with the help of like-minded friends.

At these times, there were only two Sunni theologians teaching at the university, both of them being Kurds. The other one was Molla Mahmmud Mofti, Abdullah Mofti's eldest son and Ahmad Moftizadeh's father. Aside from their career, the two fellow professors were close to one another out of the doors of the university and when Ahmad Moftizadeh followed his father to Tehran in 1958, he also developed close relations with the Mohtadi family and ended up marrying Abdul Rahman's daughter, Khadijah, thereby further cementing the ties between both families. Abdul Rahman's sons Salahadin and Abdollah, who had grown up in Tehran, gradually turned away from the religions of their fathers to the powerfully growing ideas of Marxism. They were to become leaders of the radical left Kurdish movement of Komala, which in 1979 clashed with Moftizadeh.

=== Education ===
Mohtadi was growing in this period, in a home where the flow of the political debate was a never-ending regularity. After the removal to Tehran, Abdullah was soon in elementary school at Alborz School and soon after graduating from high school, he went to the University of Tehran where he began studying business. After getting his bachelor's degree in business from the university, young Abdullah was very interested in poetry, but after a while he turned in to politics and by a short time, he was on the road to becoming one of the political figures of Iran, especially in Kurdistan.

Accordingly, Mohtadi's father was often a supportive character to young Abdullah, respecting his intellect and integrity. By his third year in college, Abdullah's increasingly vocal expressions of Marxist ideas were not just a matter of casual interest, but rather an engaging agenda in his family complex political subjects. Naturally, they debated the various facets of subjects like class struggle, tribal heritage and social advancement in Kurdistan, and the proper role of religion in society. However, cultural and familial tradition dictated that the tone of the conversation never truly resembled an adversarial debate.

Together with a group including Mohtadi and six other Kurdish students who were living in Tehran such as Foad Mostafa Soltani, Mosleh Sheikh-alislam, Shoib Zakaryai, Sedigh Kamangar and Mohammad Husein Karimi, Mohtadi decided to risk his life for those ideas. On October 27, 1969, in a secret initiation meeting in Tehran, he narrates that he became a founding member of the Komala party. His membership and activities with Komala were completely underground and not shared outside of the small group of member-activists as he continued his studies at the university.

=== Kurdistan in 1960s ===
Political activity in Kurdistan was severely repressed in the 1960s. Again, most political activists had sought refuge in Iraqi Kurdistan. Most of them, along with Mullah Mustafa Barzani, continued their activities and contributed to Barzani's movement and struggles. Abdullah's older brother Salahedin was associated with most of these movements in Kurdistan. After a while, a dispute broke out between these political activists in Kurdistan. These differences led a group of them to organize themselves in a new way to fight the Shah's regime again. The group chose the name "Revolutionary Committee of the Kurdistan Democratic Party of Iran". This group included Suleiman Moini, Mullah Avara, Suleiman Sharifzadeh who had direct contact with the Mohtadi family, especially Salahedin.

In 1967, the group lost all its members, most of whom were killed against the Shah's regime. In Tehran, as in Kurdistan, there was a lot of covert political activity, with the majority of them visiting the Mohtadi family in Tehran. In 1968, the Siahkal incident took place in northern Iran, and most of these guerrillas were defeated. These activities had a great impact on the formation of Abdullah. While studying at the University of Tehran, he and his friends decided to shape the patterns of a new party that could prepare itself to fight and use this experience of defeat.

== Political career ==
Mohtadi founded Komala with fellow students in Tehran in October 1969. The year 1969 marks the founding date of the Komala Party. With the new party being alive, now Mohtadi and his fellow party members should put the best of their efforts to hide their track from the eyes of SAVAK. They decided to cut off the extra communications that would lead to their arrest, following the decision to refrain from further discussions in political circles. Because the Mohtadi family was known to the eyes, both in Kurdistan and Tehran, their homes were always a place for surveillance by SAVAK. During this time, Abdullah's older brother, Salahedin arrested several times by SAVAK to force young and passionate Abdullah more careful and not to take risks aimlessly. With all of the incidents, at this exact period Mohtadi knew well that the Shah's regime would deal severely with any political move in existence, by remembering the lessons of the Kurdish movement in the 60's. They had to consider all aspects of their activities and further try to bring this party into the populace and the support of the populace into the party, so that at the right time, they can wage an armed endeavor against the Shah's regime.

=== Mohtadi in 1970s ===
Despite all the efforts to remain in secrecy, in the 1970s, Mohtadi was arrested three times; with his last arrest, Abdullah sentenced to spend more than three years in imprisonment for his activism against the shah regime. Lastly, after the failure of SAVAK to provide any evidence regarding Mohtadi's political actions being, he released from prison and now, his party should cope with its most important era of the pre-Islamic Revolution Iran.

After his finale release from the prison, Mohtadi and his friends was gathering around every week to discuss the progress of their agenda. They contacted so many people and characters but they never directly asked anyone to engage in active fields. As for the newcomers, they were making sure of their commitment just before their engagement to the party.

After a while, they decided that their activity among the students should split into two separate groups, one active in Tabriz and the other one active in Tehran. A group with Abdullah Mohtadi, including Foad Mustafa Sultani, Mohammad Husein Karimi and Mosleh Sheikkhol-islami expanded their activities in Tehran. Through this process, Abdullah and his friends were able to attract many people for their own gain without absorbing the SAVAK's attention.

Soon after, with the arrival of members including Jafar Shafiee, Khane Moini, Ibrahim Alizadeh, Faroq Babamiri, Omar Ilkhanizadeh, Abobakr Modaresi etc. the period of Mohtadi and his friends' activity enters a new phase. Now they were able to expand the field of their sets of duty in other cities of Kurdistan and attract more people to themselves and their collective idea. Soon most of the elites across cities of Kurdistan were coming alongside the slogans of the new agenda. Most of the people they brought with them were students, teachers, engineers, physicians and nurses in Kurdistan. Now there were active people in almost all cities of Kurdistan. Nevertheless, the challenge for Abdullah and his friends was how to position themselves among all classes of Kurdish society, especially the labor and peasants. In order to accomplish this goal, they had to understand the reality of life of this very class of Kurdish society; so they set the simple idea of "we must be like them; to work like them, to dress and to behave just like them in daily life." With this simple idea in place their comprehension of the labor class came to a more comprehensive recognition, and furthermore, they could gain their trust for the upcoming endeavor against the Shah's regime.

Mohtadi and his friends were now pursuing exactly the same policy, with each one of them involved in construction, agriculture and even baking working in different villages and cities of Kurdistan. The implication of all the efforts, enabled them to create a large brotherhood throughout Kurdistan. Interestingly enough, as Abdullah Mohtadi was arrested by SAVAK for the third time in 1974 with Foad Mostafa Soltani and Khane Moini, the undergoing network of resistance was still functional and they continued to maintain contact with organizations outside the prison.

At this time, important events were to take place in Iraqi Kurdistan, affecting the stir of Mohtadi and his friends. In 1975, the Algerian treaty was signed between the Shah and Saddam Hussein, resulting in The

Shah's support regarding Barzani to stop. Barzani was forced to come to Tehran and settle in Karaj and a year later, in 1976, this time Mam Jalal led another uprising against Saddam Hussein and started a guerrilla war against Saddam. The chains of action were causing a desperate need of help for him, but the Shah did not support them. On the other side, Saddam also had complete control over Iraqi Kurdistan, and in practice, Mam Jalal could not have hoped for much help from the people of Iraqi Kurdistan. Mam Jalal and his friends were drowning in disparity after a while, because the Peshmerga had lost several fights against Saddam. Ways to help the Peshmergas of the patriotic Union of Kurdistan were getting narrower and narrower.

Through Salahedin Mohtadi, Abdullah's older brother, Abdullah realized the situation of Mam Jalal and his friends in Iraqi Kurdistan and immediately shares the emergency to Kak Foad, whom was unofficially considered as the leader of the organization at the time. At the end they all agreed upon a call of an emergency help for Jalal Talabani and his Peshmerga forces which finally led to a campaign to raise a lot of donations for Mam Jalal and his Peshmergas throughout the people of the cities and villages. These donations were sent to Mam Jalal by Jafar Shafi'i and Sa'ad vatandoust. With the amount of receiving helps, a catastrophic defeat was prevented and the Iraqi Kurdish movement moved on. As for Abdullah and his companions, now they were closely acquainted with the experience of the Iraqi Kurdish movement which further on helped them a lot on their journey in Iranian Kurdistan. Between the years of 1977 and 1978 Komala was officially founded. In the autumn of 1978, when Kak Foad was released from prison, Mohtadi and his friends decided to reorganize their organization to the world. Therefore, they met in the fall in Sanandaj. This was not the end of their discussion about their organization. For their own security, they were forced to continue their gathering to the city of Naqadah. When their discussions were over, three members were introduced as the leaders of the organization; Foad Mustafa Soltani, Abdulla Mohtadi and Sa'ed vatandoust. Later on, this gathering will be recognized as the first congress of Komala.

=== Jamiyats in Kurdistan ===
In the years leading to the 1979 revolution, the Shah's regime arrested large groups of political activists. Social and political movements had become difficult to run, but still in universities, students occasionally demonstrated and protested against the Shah's policies. Upon their release from the prison, Abdullah Mohtadi, Kak Foad and Khane Moini decided to expand their organization under the name of "Jamiyat" which its literal translation to English is "union". For this reason, they set up "Jamiyat"s in all cities of Kurdistan. Sometimes several "Jamiyat"s were set up in a city. The first camp in Sanandaj started under the name of "Jamyat-e- Defa az Azadi va Enqlab". In English, it means: "The union for the Defense of Freedom and Revolution". They were able to organize the "Jamiyat"s well and provide a platform for them. The "Jamiyat" had a coordination council which its members consisted of representatives of each "Jamiyat". The council also elected an executive group. This board had three members: Abdullah Mohtadi, Farouq Babamiri and Saddiq Kamangar. Saddiq Kamangar also wrote an autonomy plan for Kurdistan when he represented the "Jamiyat".

=== Iranian Revolution of 1979 ===
In the absence of the Democratic Party among the people of Kurdistan, Abdullah Mohtadi and his friends were able to expand their organization. Most of the demonstrations against the Shah's regime were organized by Komala. Those who were able to communicate with the people in all cities, villages and neighborhoods of Kurdistan under the name of the "Jamiyat" could easily organize demonstrations. In one of the anti-regime demonstrations in Saqqez, a prominent member of the organization named Mohammad Husein Karimi, in which he took an active part, was wounded by the forces of the Shah's regime. A few days after the incident, on February 17, 1979, he died in hospital due to the depth of his wounds. Abdullah Mohtadi and his friends decided that they should no longer be in hideout. Thereby they revealed their organization to the eyes of the public. From this date on, they officially continued their political activities under the name of Komala Party of Iranian Kurdistan. Mohammad or Hama Husein Karimi was from a famous family in Saqqez. He had a bachelor's degree in electronics from the University of Tabriz and he was in charge of the Saqez "Jamiyat". Hama Husein Karimi was working as a builder in Sardasht under the pseudonym of "Wasta Saleh". He was one of the most active political figures in Kurdistan. Immediately after the revolution, the Komala found much support among young, educated urban people attracted by its radicalism. It was at this time that Khomeini had returned from exile in central Iran, Tehran. The Shah's regime had fallen, and most of the Shah's men had either been imprisoned or had escaped. Many political parties and groups were formed, most of which was supporting Khomeini and rallied around Khomeini. The revolution had won and the king had fled. Almost all the provinces of Iran were associated with Khomeini. Among them were only Kurdish cities that viewed Khomeini and his policies with skepticism. Kurdish parties and political activists in Kurdistan have decided to demand autonomy for Kurdistan from the newly established Khomeini-led government in Iran. Khomeini did not accept this request for pain and strongly rejected it. Khomeini called on Kurds and Kurdish parties to accept his leadership and renounce autonomy for Kurdistan. Now Abdullah and his friends, who worked under the name of Komala, had to make a decision. Komala and other Kurdish political parties did not accept Khomeini's request and did not participate in the constitutional referendum. Khomeini ordered jihad against the Kurdish people in Kurdistan. The Khomeini regime poured into Kurdistan with all its armed forces. Komala and other Kurdish parties were deeply upset by Khomeini's move. They decided to resist the armed forces of the Khomeini regime. In the first stage, the armed forces of the Khomeini regime were defeated. The Khomeini regime, under the pretext that we want to negotiate, delayed for several months so that they could reorganize their forces. When they were able to organize their armed forces, they attacked Kurdistan again.

On September 30, 1979, Kak Foad was killed in a war with the Khomeini regime. He was killed by the Islamic regime's armed forces between Saqqez and Marivan. The killing of Kak Foad has a very bad effect on Abdullah. Abdullah had lost his best friend. Kak Foad, who had been with Abdullah Mohtadi since the founding of the Komala in 1969, had now been assassinated. The killing of Kak Foad had a bad effect on all the Komala organizations. Komala had lost one of his best leaders.

During 1979–1980, Komala fought alongside another principal Iranian Kurdish armed group, the Kurdistan Democratic Party of Iran (KDPI). The uprising was a response to the wave of Kurdish nationalism following the Iranian Revolution, a perceived opportunity to gain increased autonomy not available under the Shah, the relative disorganization and chaos surrounding the establishment of the Islamic Republic, as well as other armed uprisings against the Mullahs. The Kurds had been effectively excluded from the new constitution with no provision for autonomy. The uprising started in March 1979 when Kurds seized police and military barracks in the towns of Sanandaj, Paveh, Divandarreh, Saqqez, and Mahabad. It then morphed into a wide-scale uprising across northwestern Kurdish majority areas of Iran, which resulted in the brutal suppression and deaths of approximately 6,200 Kurds.

In 1983, Komala decides, with the left parties and groups in Iran, the Iranian Communist Party to establish. One of the most prominent people they invited was Mansour Hikmat. After many meetings and conferences, they were able to establish the Communist Party of Iran. Abdullah Muhtadi, Komala's leader, became its secretary-general. He became the leader of the Communist Party of Iran. In this way, they wanted to find allies in Iran for Komala.

In 1988, Abdullah Mohtadi and his friends came to the conclusion that the establishment of the Communist Party had failed to achieve its targets. They wanted to fundamentally reconsider the Communist Party. At this time, Abdullah was criticizing the Communist Party.

=== Mohtadi and the modern Komala Party ===
Mohtadi is one of the exponents of the left movement in Iranian Kurdistan, and in the 1960s and 1970s, he and his some friends ultimately created a leftist organization in Iranian Kurdistan and took it to hiding, away from the Shah's security service. This secret organization participated in the 1979 Islamic revolution and established its political party form in March 1979. It fought alongside the PDKI and other groups during the Kurdish rebellion in 1979 and 1980. The group went into exile in Iraq in 1983 but it still managed to suspend many attacks against Iran in the early 1990s. In September 1983, the group underwent organizational changes and formed itself as a communist party, eventually joining Communist Party of Iran, as its Kurdish wing. But Mohtadi had serious criticisms of the party, which brought him the conclusion that Komala's own interpertation of communism up to that point — Maoism — in no shape or form presents an ability to meet the demands of the Kurdish people, especially in Iranian Kurdistan. For this reason, in 2000, he and a number of his fellow party members reformed and armed the Komala Party and officially left the Communist Party of Iran.

The group splintered again in 2000. One branch, the Komala Social Democrat Party of Iran, which also calls itself Komala, is still Social Democrat. A few years ago, Mohtadi took serious criticism of the policies of the Communist Party of Iran and again criticized the policies of this party. These criticisms were not viewed positively in the Communist Party, which led to sharp divisions within the party. After many and long talks, Mohtadi and his associates were forced to leave the Communist Party of Iran and revive Komala with the slogan of rebuilding Komala. From this date, Abdullah and his friends in the reconstruction of Komala, tried to take a realistic path by criticizing their own past. Therefore, reforms in the party began, they were able in a very short time, many people inside and outside Kurdistan with them.

Komala has clashed with Iranian forces, but since the 1990s it has primarily used its Peshmerga fighters to defend training camps and Kurdish settlements in Iraq. Some of its fighters joined the fight against ISIS in Iraq in 2014.

For the past few years, Mohtadi and his Party (Iranian Kurdistan's Komala Party) has taken the lead in trying to unify these different groups behind the idea of replacing Iran's clerical regime with a decentralized federal government whose constitution will safeguard the rights of the country's ethnic minorities.

Komala of Iran, which also calls itself Komala, describes itself as a party closer to the ideals of the Social Democrats.

== Posts ==
- Originator of the Komala Party (1969)
- Member of the Central Committee of Komala (1979)
- Secretary General of Komala (1980)
- Secretary General of the Communist Party (1983)
- Secretary General of Komala (2000)
- Secretary of the Transitional Council of Iran (2019)

== Books ==
1. مقدمه‌ای بر گسست و گذار
2. شۆرش لە سەردەمی نوێدا
