= Mohammad Hossein Karimi =

Official representative of the Kurdistan Democratic Party of Iran in Germany

- محەممەد حوسێن کەریمی
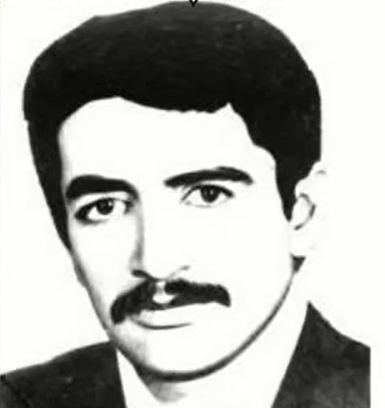
- Born: 20 February 1949; Saqqez, Kurdistan Province, Iran
- Died: 15 February 1979 (aged 29); Saqqez, Iran
- Cause of death: Assassination
- Resting place: Shohada Cemetery, Saqqez, Iran
- Citizenship: Iran
- Education: Agriculture engineer
- Title: One of the founders and the first leaders of Komala Party in Kurdistan
- Term: 1968–1979
- Political party: Komala Party of Iranian Kurdistan

Mohammad Hossein Karimi (Kurdish: محەممەد حوسێن کەریمی, Mohammad Hossein Karimi; 20 February 1949 – 15 February 1979) was one of the founders and the first leaders of Komala Party in Iran, who was born in Saqqez, Iran. He was killed on February 15, 1979 as a result of being shot by military guards while the people attacking on the police central station during the demonstrations related to the Iranian Revolution. The day of his death is named as the day of Komala.

== Biography ==
Mohammad Hossein Karimi was born in Saqqez in a working-class family and financially moderate. He completed his education up to his diploma in the same city and went to the Faculty of Agriculture University of Tehran in Karaj to continue his studies in agricultural engineering. While studying he agreed with many Kurdish students, including Foad Mostafa Soltani to establish a political party. That party was called Komala later. Before that, he founded the Farmers' Union because of having a good relationship with the trustees, elders and religious families of the region. Later Ezaddin Husseini took over the leadership of this union.

== Political activities ==
After graduating, Karimi worked in various cities for some time. Then he was politically active for a few years in the villages of Kurdistan and under the pseudonym of Master Saleh. In the meantime, he was in contact with political activists in different parts of Kurdistan to expand his party, and secretly managed the affairs of the Komala party with his associates. On February 4, 1979, his brother Mohammad Raouf Karimi was killed during a march in Tehran and this caused him to return to Saqqez for a while. Three days later on the anniversary of the Siahkal incident, Mohammad Hossein Karimi addressed the people at the Saadi school and spoke about the socio-political situation in Iran and Kurdistan. With the spread of the Iranian Revolution marches to different cities of the country, in the city of Saqqez, people took to the streets to try to control military centers such as the police and gendarmerie. With the fire of Saqez Central Police, Mohammad Hossein Karimi entered the police station to control the situation. The central police station caught fire. Karimi went their in order to prevent the fire from spreading but he was shot. After this incident, he was taken to the hospital and died two days later, on February 15, 1979. His body was buried in the cemetery at the end of Shohada Street in Saqqez. With the death of Mohammad Hossein Karimi, Komala Party, which had been operating secretly for nine years until then, made its activities public and named the day of Karimi's death on February 15 as Komala Day.

In the years following the Iranian revolution, the Komala Party split, and now has three factions: Komala of the Toilers of Kurdistan, Komala Party of Iranian Kurdistan, and Komalah (CPI).

== Resources ==
- In memory of the comrades of Martyr Saeed Moeini, Mohammad Hossein Karimi, members of Komala, June 1979, published by Komala publications
- Biography of Mohammad Hossein Karimi, June 1979, published by Komala Publications
- The Forgotten Years of Kurdish Nationalism in Iran, Abbas Vakili, page 166, 2020
