= Kurdistan conflict =

Kurdistan conflict may refer to one of the following:

- Kurdish–Turkish conflict - between PKK and affiliated Kurdish organizations against Turkey from 1984
- Iraqi–Kurdish conflict - a separatist struggle of Barzan tribe and later KDP and PUK in north Iraq from 1919 until 2003
- Iranian–Kurdish conflict - from 1918
- Rojava Revolution - part of the Syrian civil war (from 2012)
