= Komala Party of Iranian Kurdistan – Reunification Faction =

Komala – Reunification Faction
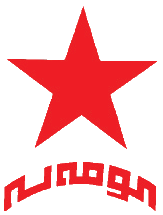
- Leader: Abdulla Konaposhi
- Founded: 29 April 2008; 18 years ago
- Dissolved: 2014
- Split from: Komala Party of Iranian Kurdistan
- Merged into: Komala Party of Iranian Kurdistan
- Headquarters: Sulaymaniyah, Kurdistan Region, Iraq

Party flag

The Komala Party of Iranian Kurdistan – Reunification Faction (Kurdish: كۆمه‌ڵه‌ی شۆڕشگێڕی زه‌حمه‌تكێشانی كوردستانی ئێران – ڕه‌وتی‌ یه‌کگرتنه‌وه, romanized: Komeley Şorrişgêrrî Zehmetkêşanî Kurdistanî Êran – Rewtî Yekgirtinewe) simply known as the Komala – Reunification Faction, was an armed separatist ethnic party of Kurds in Iran, exiled in northern Iraq.

It split from the Komala Party of Iranian Kurdistan on 29 April 2008 over internal disagreements and is led by Abdulla Konaposhi.

== See also ==
- Komala of Revolutionary Toilers of Iranian Kurdistan (1969/1979–1984)
  - Komala Kurdistan's Organization of the Communist Party of Iran (1984–present)
    - Komala Party of Iranian Kurdistan (2000–present)
      - Komala – Reform Faction (2007–present)
      - Komala Party of Iranian Kurdistan – Reunification Faction (2008–2014)
    - Socialist Faction of Komala (2009–2022)
