= Hama Rashid revolt =

Kurdish tribal uprising in Iran (1941-1944)

- Part of the Kurdish separatism in Iran, World War II
Date	27 September 1941 – May 1942 (first phase); Summer 1942–1944 (second phase)
Location	Baneh-Sardasht region of Iran
Result	Iranian victory

Belligerents
Pahlavi Iran; Some Kurdish tribes	Kurdish tribesmen

Commanders and leaders
(Pahlavi Iran) Mohammad Reza Pahlavi (Pahlavi Iran) Morteza Yazdanpanah (Pahlavi Iran) Hasan Arfa (Pahlavi Iran) Ali Razmara (Pahlavi Iran) Ali Riazi (Pahlavi Iran) Mahmud Kanisanan	Hama Rashid

Strength
More 2,000 soldiers and many tanks	Unknown

The Hama Rashid revolt (Sorani Kurdish: شۆڕشی حەمە ڕەشید Persian: شورش حمه رشید) was a tribal uprising in Pahlavi Iran, during the Second World War, following the Anglo-Soviet invasion of Iran. The tribal revolt erupted in the general atmosphere of anarchy throughout Iran and its main faction was led by Muhammed Rashid, lasting from 27 September 1941 until May 1942 and then re-erupted in 1944, resulting in Rashid's defeat.

== Background ==
Kurdish tribal unrest began in modern Iran, right with the ascendance of the Pahlavi dynasty, erupting into bloody violence with the Simko Shikak revolt in 1920, and continuing with further Kurdish tribal revolts in 1926 and 1931.

With the general instability in Iran during the Anglo-Soviet invasion of Iran, the British were approached by the tribal leader of Baneh Hama Rashid and by a Mahabad leader Qazi Muhammad, in order to obtain protection. The delegation of chieftains arrived in Baghdad, requesting to include their areas in the "British zone", but were refused.

At the time, Tehran was desperate to prevent Kurdish secession, sending a government commission into Kurdistan in November 1941. It convened local Kurdish tribal leaders, promising cultural freedom in line with the right to bear arms, in return for loyalty to the Iranian government. The tribes had however enjoyed those privileges from the time of the deposition of Reza Shah two months earlier, thus rejecting the Iranian offer. To satisfy themselves, the tribal leaders also demanded assurances to return confiscated lands and employment of tribal leaders and their representatives in Tehran. Indeed, some eight months later, a Tribal Commission was established in Tehran to investigate Kurdish land complaints. In the meantime, however, the tribes aspired to install a new order, before a significant Allied intervention changes the situation and fills the power vacuum.

Just prior to the entrance of Soviet troops into Rezaiyeh, a local bazaar was set in fire, also picking up large stockpiles of weapons, left behind by fleeing Iranian soldiery. Further south, the areas of Sanandaj and Kermanshah fell into disorder and by the end of the year raids by armed Kurdish tribesmen reached as far as Tabriz. In January 1942, relations between Azeris, Kurds, and Assyrian Christians in Urmiyeh turned strained, with Kurds and Christian Armenians and Assyrians forming a joint Liberation party. The joint forces raided Azeri villages. In April 1942, a renewed tribal disorder in the area prompted the Iranian government to arm Shia peasants, but on the other hand, removed gendarmerie forces from lands between Khoy and Mahabad to satisfy demands.

== First conflict phase ==
Meanwhile, on 27 September 1941 in central Kurdistan, Hama Rashid seized Baneh and had set up his own administration. With an aid of a number of followers, he executed his authority in the Baneh-Sardasht region. At the time, despite his involvement in the death of a senior Iranian officer, and is regarded as a rebel, Iran was too weak to subdue him. Iran acknowledged his authority and made him a sort of a Governor of the region. By December he was already threatening to seize Sanandaj and was only convinced to refrain from action by a British threat. In February 1942, Rashid's forces seized Saqqiz, but were driven out of there in April. In May 1942, the Iranian army sent a 2000 soldiers and some tanks with allied troops of the Kurdish Tilekuhi tribe. Rashids soldiers were defeated and its tribe was ransacked by the Tilekuhi's. Upon pressure of the British Empire and the Soviets, Tehran stopped its persecution and negotiations regarding Hama Rashid political role began.

In early autumn of 1942, Hama Rashid agreed to become a semi-official governor under Tehran authority as a local office, but according to a British report Neither side would hesitate to abandon this relationship if it could find something more attractive. Hama Rashids headquarters was to be in Baneh. About the same time, the Iranian government also recognized another Kurdish leader - Mahmud Kanisenan as a semi-autonomous governor over the Mariwan region.

== Second conflict phase ==
According to McDowall, in 1944, the relationship between Hama Rashid and Iranian authorities was broken. Jwaideh puts the beginning of the second phase to summer of 1942. In any case, Rashid attacked Mariwan territories of his neighbour Mahmud Khan Kanisanan - an appointed Iranian governor as well. Mahmud Khan requested assistance from Tehran and was aided by two Iranian columns supported by light tanks, he managed to defeat Hama Rashid's forces. Iranian forces who rushed to rescue Mahmud Khan, managed to drive Hama Rashid into Iraqi Kingdom. During the retreat Rashid had however succeeded to burn some 1,000 houses in Baneh. Shortly after, also Mahmud Khan himself was driven out into Iraq as well by the same Iranian forces, seeking to get rid of Kurdish semi-autonomous authority in the region.

== Aftermath ==
As a result of the above-described actions, by 1945 the government of Iran effectively controlled Kurdish areas south of Saqqiz-Baneh-Sardasht line. However, the government was still not able to establish authority north to it up to the Soviet zone. It was Mahabad, located in those areas, where the most important Kurdish political developments were to be initiated shortly after the uprising of Hama Rashid. The Iran crisis of 1946 took shape, seeking to establish Azeri and Kurdish states with Soviet support. Hama Rashid and his forces took an important role in this next chapter of Iranian–Kurdish conflict.

== Foreign reactions ==
The United Kingdom opposed any kind of autonomy or independence for Iranian Kurds, which in their opinion would prompt a similar demand from the Arabs of Khuzestan and perhaps other ethnic groups, especially Iraqi tribes and most notably the Kurds of Iraq. Britain acted to ease ethnic and tribal tensions within Iran and told Tehran to settle Kurdish demands, reinstate tribal leaders and permit tribal migration as long as it did not breach the peace. It was initially assumed that Russians might assist Kurdish independence movement, but their policies quickly demonstrated those hopes were misplaced.

== See also ==
- Timeline of Kurdish uprisings
- List of modern conflicts in the Middle East
