= KDPI–Komala conflict =

Conflict between two Kurdish organizations

- Part of Kurdish separatism in Iran and the Iran–Iraq War
Date	1984–1991
Location	Iranian Kurdistan
Result	Iranian victory: Effectiveness of both KDPI and Komala; Unilateral ceasefire declared by Komala; Komala exiles to Iraqi Kurdistan 1992
Territorial changes	Iran retained territorial control

Belligerents
KDPI	Komala	Iran

Commanders and leaders
Abdul Rahman Ghassemlou X Sadegh Sharafkandi	Foad Mostafa Soltani †	(Iran) Ruhollah Khomeini

Units involved
3,000–5,000	2,500–3,000	Unknown

Casualties and losses
320+ killed	470+ killed	unknown

The conflict between the Democratic Party of Iranian Kurdistan (KDPI) and the Komala Party of Iranian Kurdistan began when the latter refused to stop calling the former a "class enemy" and the tensions started to grow. Komala continued making anti-KDPI propaganda, and subsequently KDPI declared war on Komala. Both Kurdish organizations ended up simultaneously fighting against Iranian forces separately.

== See also ==
- Iraqi Kurdish Civil War
- PKK insurgency in the Kurdistan Region
