= Ezaddin Husseini =

Sunni Kurdish cleric and Iranian politician

Sheikh Ezaddin Husseini
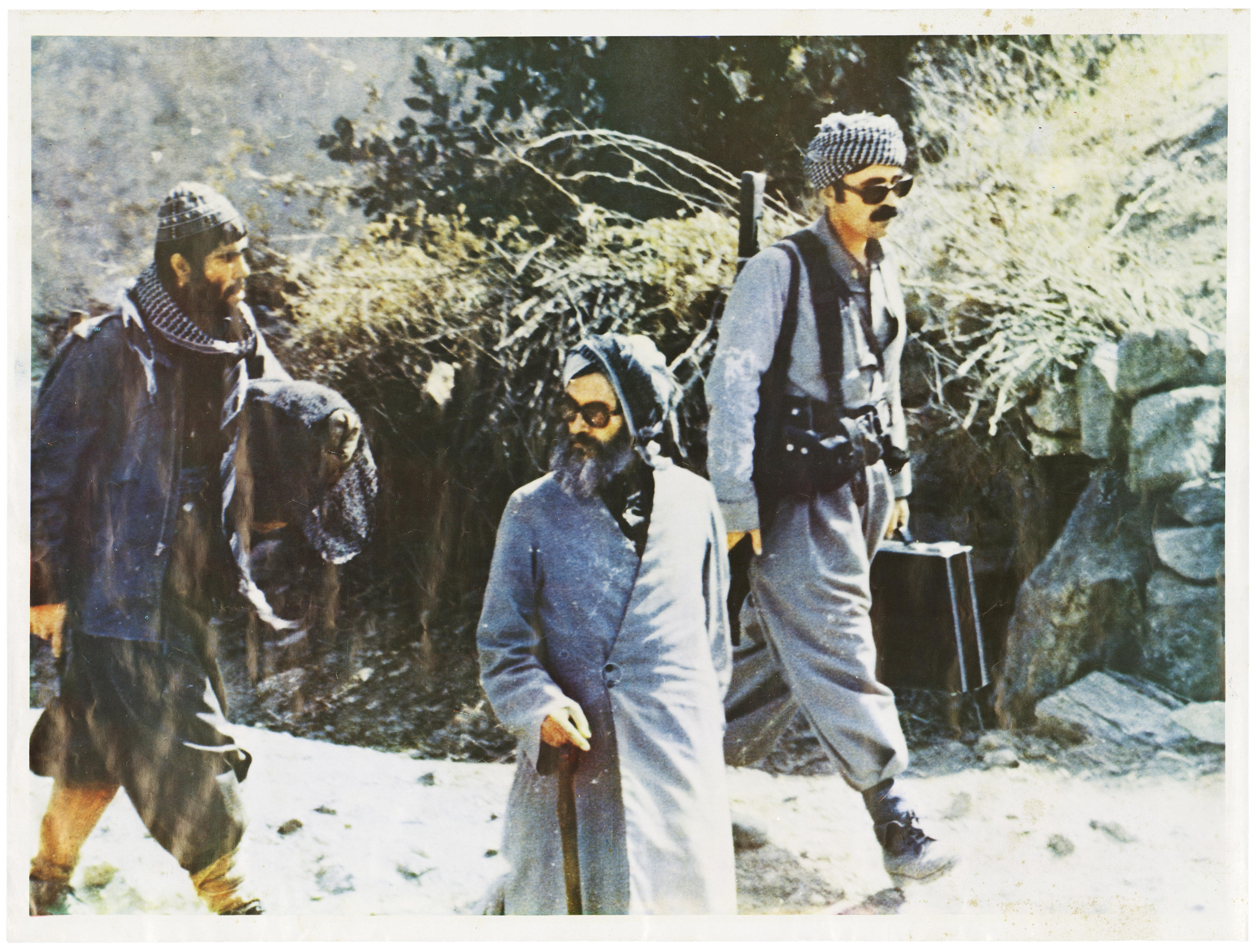
- Ezaddin Hosseini with two of his bodyguards during the Iranian revolution
- Born: Izadin Huseynî; 5 May 1921; Baneh, Qajar Iran
- Died: 10 February 2011 (aged 89); Uppsala, Sweden
- Other name: Hawin
- Known for: Politic

Sheikh Ezaddin Husseini (also referred to as Mamosta Ezaddin Husseini) was a Kurdish Sunni Islamic cleric, political leader, and figure.

Sheikh Ezadin Husseini, a famous and top clergy in Rojhalat, was the mediator between different forces in Kurdistan. He has been teaching in the schools of religious sciences in Eastern Kurdistan for 30 years and has started his official political activity since his membership in the Komala JK in 1943. He is also known in Kurdistan as Mamosta (meaning master).

== Early life and studies ==
Ezaddin Husseini came from a religious Sunni Kurd family. His father was an imam in the city of Baneh. As a tradition and as a protest against Reza Shah's secularization of Iran's teaching style, Izzadin's father did not send him to regular school. He was the brother of Sheikh Jalal Hosseini. Izzadin studied Islamic tradition, philosophy and religion with various clerics in the 1950s.

== Career ==
Ezaddin Husseini worked as an imam in various cities and villages in Iranian Kurdistan until he was employed in Mahabad's largest mosque as a Friday preacher and mullah. He was theologically influenced and inspired by many well-known Sunni Muslim scribes in the Islamic world, one of whom was Muhammad Abduh. Izzadin's interpretation and philosophy of Islam and Sharia was more liberal than Khomeini. Mamosta believed that religion and politics must be separate and that the state should be a secular state in order to meet and solve the challenges of the modern world. Mamosta did not see an Islamic state as the only option. From 1960 until the Iranian Revolution, he had taught many important figures in Islamic studies, including Abdulla Hassanzadeh, leader of the PDK-I in the 1990s.

== Komala Party and Mamosta ==
During the anti-Pahlavi demonstrations in 1978, he became a leading figure in the freedom struggle. Due to his background and his popularity among Kurds in Iranian Kurdistan, Izzadin became a unifying figure for Kurdish youths and Kurdish students who eventually formed a new nationalist movement in the 1960s which after the Iranian Revolution became Komala Party of Iranian Kurdistan. After the fall of the Shah, Izzadin continued to support Komala. He believed that it had better conditions and greater chances of developing into a national party in Iranian Kurdistan. His collaboration with Komala in formality played a guiding role. As pointed out by Izzadin's popularity among the main factors for the political growth Komala experienced in the first years after the Iranian revolution, something Komala showed and benefited from. During the riots in Iranian Kurdistan in 1979, some Sunni Muslim leaders called on Izzadin to establish Khabat with them. But Sheikh Izzadin was advised not to get involved such a party. This advice came from the leadership of Komala, who urged him to maintain his independence as the spiritual leader of Kurdistan. Izzadin accepted this invitation from Komala but his brother Hans Sheikh Jalal Husseini helped create Khabat. Sheik Jalal led Khabat from August 1980 in the fight against the Islamic Republic of Iran.

== Death ==
He lived in Uppsala, Sweden for the last 20 years of his life. He died on 10 February 2011.
