= Qods Mohajer-6 =

Unmanned aerial combat vehicle

Mohajer-6
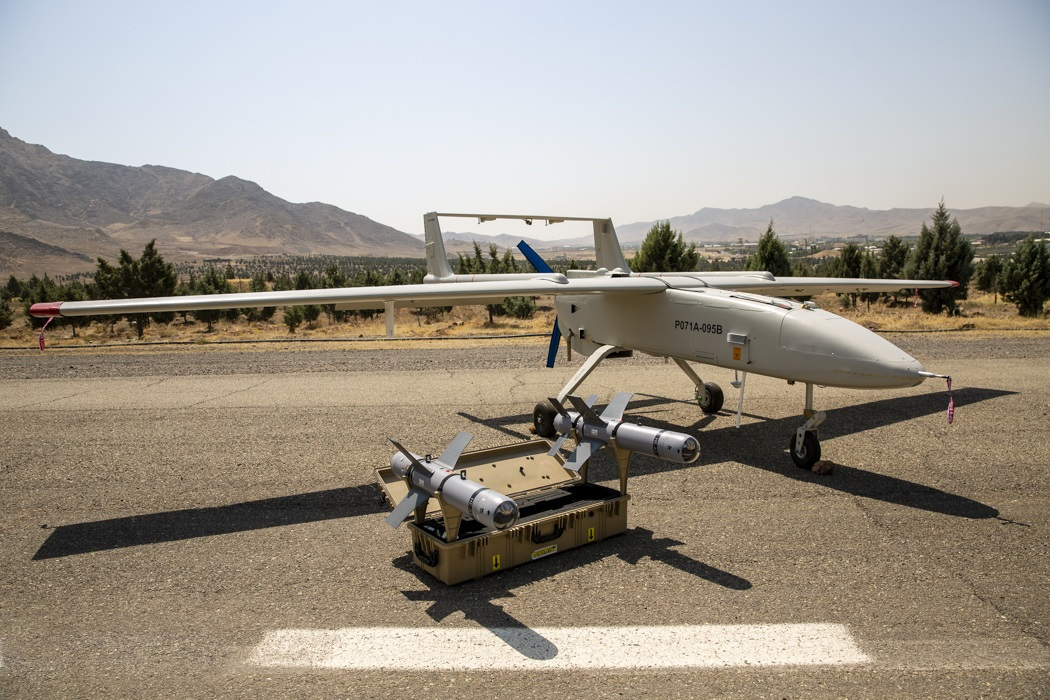

General information
- Type: Multirole, including ISR and air-to-ground strike
- National origin: Iran
- Manufacturer: Qods Aviation Industry Company
- Designer: Qods Aviation Industry Company
- Status: In service
- Primary user: Iran
- Number built: Not known

History
- Manufactured: February 2018

The Qods Mohajer-6 (Persian: پهپاد مهاجر-6, literally: "Immigrant Drone") is an Iranian single-engine multirole ISTAR UAV capable of carrying a multispectral surveillance payload and/or up to four precision-guided munitions.

The Mohajer-6 was unveiled in April 2016 and entered mass production in February 2018. As of February 2018, ten have been manufactured for the IRGC Ground Forces, and 40 are planned for the IRGC Navy. It complements the larger Shahed 129 operated by the IRGC Aerospace Force. The drone has also been delivered to the Iranian Army. In 2022, Iran provided multiple Mohajer-6 drones to Russia during Russo-Ukrainian war. It has a maximum speed of 200 km/h, an endurance of 12 hours, and a ceiling of 16,000–18,000 ft.

== Design ==
The Mohajer-6 has a rectangular fuselage, an upwards-sloping nose, twin tailbooms, a top-mounted horizontal stabilizer, uncanted wingtips, straight wings mounted high and to the rear of the body, and air intakes on the top and bottom of the engine. The Mohajer-6 is controlled by two elevators on the horizontal stabilizer, rudders on the vertical stabilizers, and two flaps per wing. Unlike other Mohajer variants, it has a three-bladed propeller. According to a specification sheet provided by the Iran Ministry of Defense, the Mohajer-6 has a wingspan of 10 meters and is 5.67 meters long.

As with other members of the Mohajer family, the Mohajer-6 is made of composite materials.

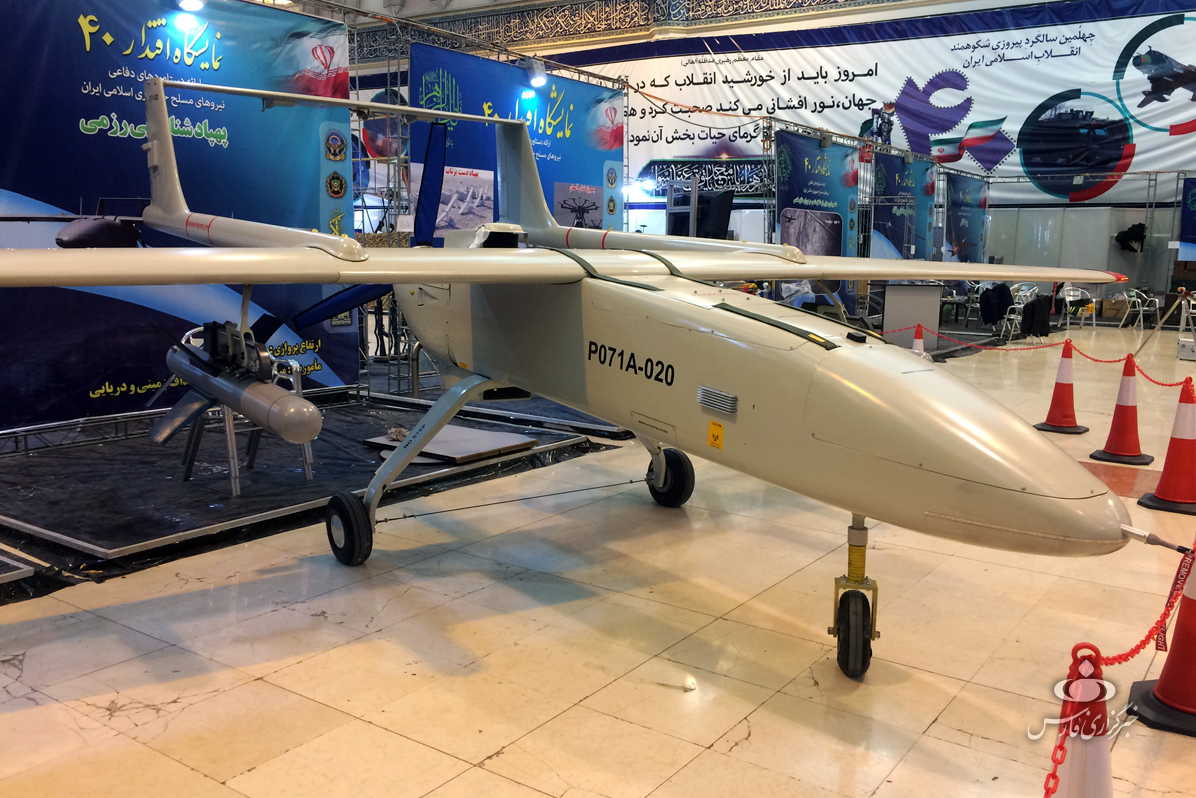
A Mohajer-6 with a Qaem missile under the wing

The Mohajer-6 has fixed tricycle landing gear, which underwent changes between the unveiling ceremony in 2017 and mass production in 2018, perhaps to accommodate more weight. It is launched and recovered via runway takeoff/landing.

It has a fixed, forward-facing camera for navigation and a gimbal on the chin for a laser range finder and multispectral IR and visible light electro-optical imagery. The Mohajer-6 has three antennas, two on its left wing and one on its right, and a pitot tube on its nose. The Mohajer-6 has two main variants. The A variant has two hardpoints, one under each wing, which can each carry one Qaem TV/IR-guided missile or one Almas missile. (Note: For unknown reasons most of the Mohajer-6s displayed at Iran's mass production announcement in 2018 had no hardpoints.) The B variant has four hardpoints, with two under each wing carrying the same types of missiles. It has an autopilot system capable of automatic takeoff and landing. In addition, Iran describes it as capable of being fitted with electronic support measures, communications jamming, or electronic warfare payloads.

In August 2022, the Mohajer-6 was reported to be equipped with the Almas missile.

== Performance ==
The Mohajer-6 has a maximum takeoff weight of 600–670 kg and can carry about 100–150 kg in armaments, depending on model. The ground control station of Mohajer-6 has 200–500 km range. It has a maximum speed of 200 km/h, an endurance of 12 hours, and a 16,000-18,000 ft (4600–5500 m) ceiling.

Multiple sources say that although the Mohajer-6 is designed by Qods Aviation, it is manufactured by Qods' longtime rival, Iran Aircraft Manufacturing Industries Corporation (HESA). Both Qods and HESA are subsidiaries of Iran's state-owned Aerospace Industries Organization.

== Operational history ==
In 2018, some Mohajer-6s were reportedly based out of Qeshm Island.

In July 2019, Iran used the Mohajer-6 against PJAK militants. The Mohajer-6 has reportedly been used against Jaish ul-Adl in 2023.

In September 2022, a Russian Telegram post claimed, that Russia used a Mohajer-6 to guide Geran-2 suicide drones to their targets in Ukraine during their Invasion of Ukraine. In the same month, Iran had also used the drone to attack Kurdish political party headquarters in Iraqi Kurdistan.

Iran has supplied these drones to the Sudanese Army during the Sudanese civil war. It has been allegedly used during the Battle of Khartoum.

== Operators ==
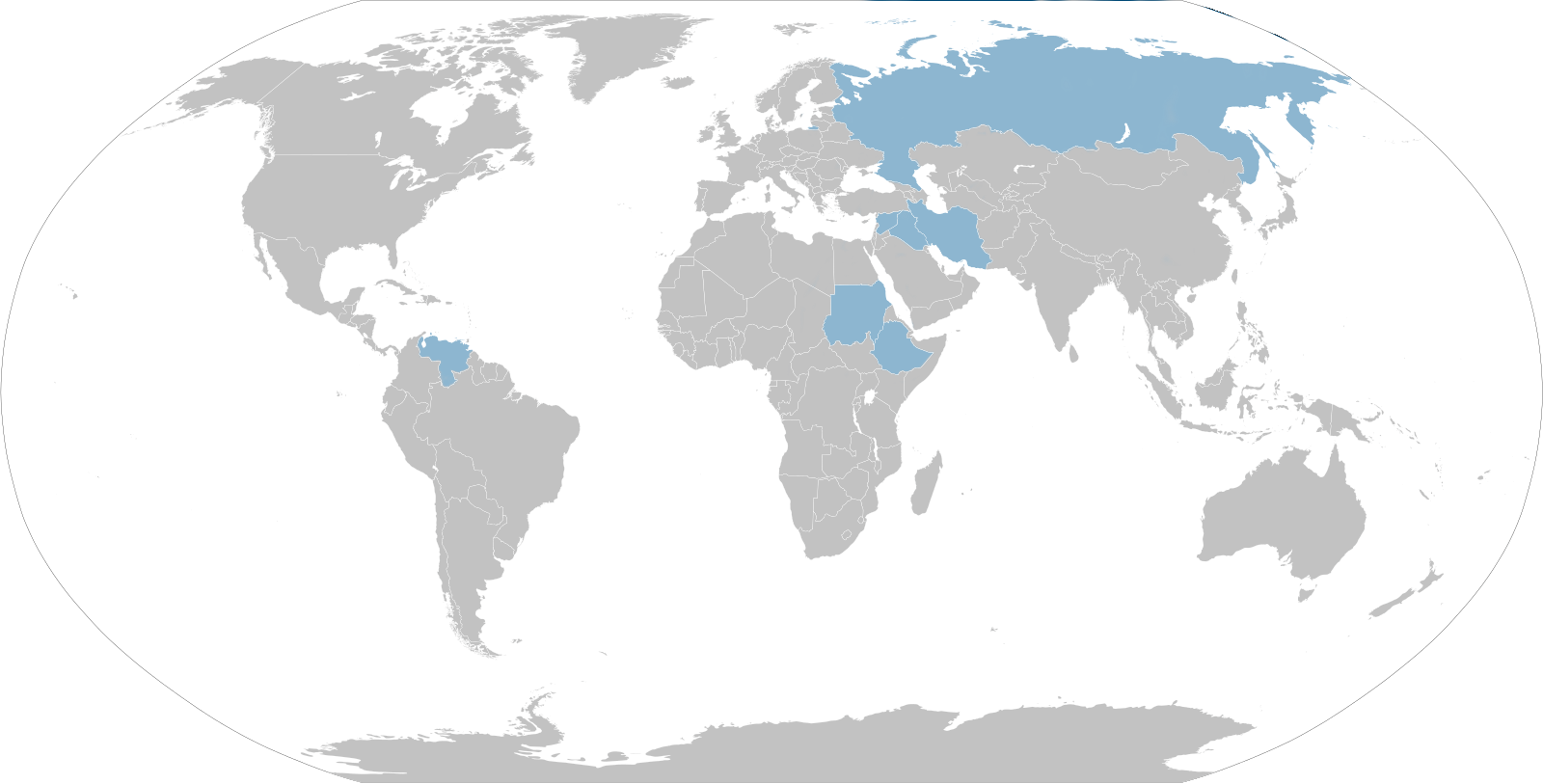
Mohajer-6 Operators

- Ethiopia: Reported to be used by Ethiopia.
- Iran:
  - Islamic Revolutionary Guard Corps Ground Forces
  - Islamic Revolutionary Guard Corps Navy: 15 known to be in service.
  - Islamic Republic of Iran Army Ground Forces
- Iraq:
  - Popular Mobilization Forces
- Russia: Bought and used by Russia during the 2022 Russian invasion of Ukraine. This has been indirectly confirmed on 23 September 2022, when a Mohajer-6 crashed in the Black Sea near the coast of Odesa.
- Sudan
  - Sudanese Armed Forces
- Venezuela: It was reported in November 2020 that technology transfer was likely done. A Venezuelan Mohajer-6 was reported to be seen in Caracas in the same month. President Nicolás Maduro claimed that the country can one day export Venezuelan-made drones.

=== Former operators ===
- Syria:
  - Syrian Armed Forces

== Specifications ==
Manufacturer: Qods Aviation Industries / HESA

While official manufacturer specifications remain unreleased, details compiled from Iranian domestic news reports (June 2017 and August 2022) indicate the following metrics across two primary variants:

General characteristics

- Crew: 2 operators per Ground Control Station (GCS)
- Length: 7.5 m (24 ft 7 in)
- Wing span: 10.0 m (32 ft 10 in)
- Max Takeoff Weight (MTOW): 600 kg - 670 kg (1,323 Ibs - 1,477 lbs)
- Payload Capacity: 100 kg - 150 kg (220 Ibs - 330 lbs)
- Powerplant: 1 × 115 hp water-cooled 4-stroke engine (Rotax 914 or HESA indigenous equivalent)
- Propeller & Fuel: 3-bladed propeller; standard gasoline (petrol)

Performance & Operational Limits

- Max speed: 200 km/h (110 knots)
- Cruise speed: 130 km/h (70 knots)
- Operational Range (Radius of action): 2,000 km - 2400 km (1,080 nmi - 1,300 nmi)
- Direct Line-of-Sight Data Link: 200 km - 500 km (130 mi - 312 mi)
- Service ceiling: 25,000 ft (7,600 m)
- Operational altitude: 16,000 ft - 18,000 ft (4,876 m - 5,486 m)
- Flight Endurance: Up to 12 hours

Armaments & Hardpoints

The Mohajer-6 features six hardpoints (four under-wing and two under-fuselage). Utilizing a modular launching system common to Iranian UAV platforms, it supports a wide variety of ordnance and equipment:

- Precision Munitions: Air-to-ground missiles, air-to-air missiles, guided rockets, and precision-guided mortar rounds.
- Payload Pods: Electronic Countermeasure (ECM), electronic intelligence, and radar detection/warning systems.
