= Suleiman Moini =

- Born: Mahabad; 1933; Iran
- Died: 1968 (aged 34–35); Iraq
- Other name: Faiq Amin
- Known for: Politics
- Partner: Maryam Yazdanfar

Suleiman Moini was an Iranian Kurdish political activist and one of the leaders of the Revolutionary Committee of the Kurdish Democratic Party of Iran.

== Biography ==
=== Early life and education ===
Suleiman Moeini was born in January 1933 in Mahabad. His father, Mohammad Amin Moeini, was the Minister of Government of the Republic of Mahabad during the time of Qazi Mohammad. Moeini continued his education in the cities of Mahabad, Tabriz and Tehran.

=== Political activity ===
After the collapse of the 1946 republic, the political activities of the Kurds in Iran declined. Some of the 1946 political activists went to Iraqi Kurdistan and later joined the rebellion of Mustafa Barzani in the 1960s.

Suleiman Moini, in spite of being young was already an experienced peshmerga. According to Helene Krulich-Ghassemlou he had been the most respected member in the KDPI collective leadership in the 1960s.

==== 1967 Uprising ====
From 1946 to the 1979 Iranian revolution, the only major event was a short period of armed struggle from 1967 to 1968 led by cadres of a group called the "Revolutionary Committee of the KDP". In 1966 several members of the KDPI, including Ismail Sharifzadeh, Qadir Sharif, Suleiman Moini and Malla Aware (future leaders of the Revolutionary Committee), left Ahmad Tawfiq's KDPI. They stressed on military struggles against Tehran, instead of joining the rebellion of Barzani in Iraqi Kurdistan. For eighteen months, from 1967 to 1968, the Revolutionary Committee of the KDPI led an armed combat against the Shah's heavily armed troops. In the end, the majority of its members were killed. The party was decapitated. Barzani's forces, because of their military and financial reliance on the Shah's regime in the 1960s, cooperated with the Persian military forces.

=== Death ===
Due to repression Suleyman Moini fled to Iraq, but in there on May 15, 1968 he was executed by the Iraqi Kurdistan Democratic Party led by M. Mustafa Barzanî, and his body was given to Iranian SAVAK. The SAVAK hung out Moini's funeral for few days. His funeral, riddled with bullets, were attached to a ladder with a notice around his neck that said: "Suleiman Moini - this is how traitors die". The regime's hired ruffians carried the ladder with his body from village to village to dissuade the population from opposing the Shah.

Massoud Barzani in his book Barzanî and the Kurdish rebellion, said: "We shot Suleyman Mooni and gave his funeral to Iran".
