= Komala Party of Iranian Kurdistan =

Coordinates: 35.4069°N 45.4657°E

Komala
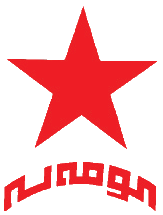
- Red star combined with the Soviet-style typography of Komala in Farsi script
- Abbreviation: KPIK
- Leader: Abdulla Mohtadi
- Founder: Foad Mostafa Soltani; Mohammad Hossein Karimi; Abdulla Mohtadi
- Founded: 1969; 2000
- Split from: Komalah (CPI) (2000)
- Merged into: Communist Party of Iran (1983)
- Headquarters: Sulaymaniyah, Kurdistan Region
- Membership (2017): <1,000 (estimate)
- Ideology: Social democracy; Kurdish minority interests; Federalism (Iranian); Secularism; Pragmatism; Left-wing nationalism; Historically: Communism; Marxism–Leninism; Maoism
- Political position: Centre-left to left-wing; Historically: Far-left
- National affiliation: Congress of Nationalities for a Federal Iran; Coalition of Political Forces of Iranian Kurdistan (2026–present)
- International affiliation: Socialist International (consultative); Progressive Alliance; UNPO
- Colors: Red

Party flag

Website
- www.komalainternational.org; www.komala.org; www.komala.com

The Komala Party of Iranian Kurdistan (Kurdish: كۆمه‌ڵه‌ی شۆڕشگێڕی زه‌حمه‌تكێشانی كوردستانی ئێران, romanized: Komełey Şorrişgêrrî Zehmetkêşanî Kurdistanî Êran, lit. 'Society of Revolutionary Toilers of Iranian Kurdistan'), commonly shortened to Komalah (Kurdish: Komełe; Persian: کومله), is a social-democratic ethnic party of Kurds in Iran. Formerly with Marxist-Leninist and communist ties, the Komalah is a well established party with a history of more than five decades. The Komala party's headquarters are presently in the Kurdistan Region of Iraq. They have an armed wing that has a history of leading the Kurdish resistance. The Komalah has advocated for anti-imperialism and Kurdish self-determination.

The group is classified as a terrorist organization by Iran and Japan. Since 2018, it is a registered lobby group in the United States.

Komala has been engaged in guerrilla warfare against the Iranian government, notably during the 1979 Kurdish rebellion and the Iran–Iraq War. It was also involved in armed conflict against the Democratic Party of Iranian Kurdistan (KDPI) during the 1980s and early 1990s. After a protracted ceasefire, the organization declared that armed conflict with Iran had resumed as of 2017.

== History ==
It is not known when exactly the organization began its activity. According to the account of Abdulla Mohtadi, he co-founded the group on 27 October 1969 at a secret initiation meeting together with six other Kurdish students in Tehran. This is disputed by Hussein Moradbegi and Iraj Farzad, two co-founders who state that the group was officially born on 26 January 1979. Abbas Vali argues the latter view is correct, as the 1969-established organization had no specific ethnic identity and had no position on Kurdistan, and Kurdish members of the former –Foad Mostafa Soltani, Mohammad Hossein Karimi, Abdollah Mohtadi, Tayeb Abbas Ruh Illahi, Mohsen Rahimi, Ibrahim Alizade, Sa’ed Vatandoust, Hussein Moradbagi, Omar Ilkhanizadeh and Iraj Farzad– created an offshoot.

The organization initially operated underground, and became public after the Iranian Revolution in 1979. Shortly afterwards, they boycotted the March 1979 referendum, as well as the next referendum of December 1979. Ladislav Bittman wrote in The KGB and Soviet Disinformation that Komala was part of the KGB's network in Iran, and was founded under the financial and ideological influence of the Soviet Union. Edgar O'Ballance states that Komala received "help" from the Soviet KGB.

In 1981, Komala refused to join the National Council of Resistance of Iran (NCRI).

In September 1983, the group underwent organizational changes and patterned itself as an orthodox communist party, eventually joining the Communist Party of Iran, as its Kurdish wing. In 2000, the faction led by Abdullah Mohtadi split from the latter and styled itself as the "original" Komala.

During the George W. Bush administration, the group's leader met American officials in 2005 and 2006 amidst approval of Iran Freedom and Support Act budget. While it is unclear which groups have been funded through the program, Mohtadi welcomed aid in 2008 and stated "If you’re a political movement that is part of an opposition, you need help from abroad... We're not ashamed to admit it." In 2006, the party set up its Sweden-based satellite television named Rojhelat TV. The Turkish TV channel NTV reported that the channel has been established with financial assistance from the United States.

The faction led by Omar Ilkhanizade split in October 2007 on the grounds that the politburo acted non-democratically, founding the faction of reform. On 29 April 2008, another faction, led by Abdulla Konaposhi, accused Mohtadi of "non-democratic management", and expressing dissatisfaction with a policy of cooperation with monarchists including Reza Pahlavi, split from the group to establish the reunification faction. Both factions have since reunited with the party.

On 21 June 2023, the alliance between the Komala Party of Iranian Kurdistan and Komala of the Toilers of Kurdistan collapsed. Following the collapse, the two clashed, and as a result of the infighting, two were killed and three were wounded. The clashes took place in Zargawez in Iraq's Kurdistan Region. Norway-based Kurdish human rights NGO Hengaw offered readiness to mediate between the two.

== Ideology ==
The group is ideologically Marxist–Leninist, therefore it saw itself revolutionary and transcending ethnic boundaries, unlike the rival Democratic Party of Iranian Kurdistan. The Komala Party claims to support social democracy, federalism, and secularism in Iran. It was predominantly Maoist during first decade of its activity and adopted it as a mobilization strategy to recruit from peasantry and lower urban class. Michael Gunter says that inspired by Chinese Communist Revolution, they became Maoists and viewed Kurdish nationalism as parochial.

However at its first congress held in 1979, the ideology was renounced due to being "inappropriate to Kurdish conditions in Iran". In 1981, the group initiated self-criticism of its past and concluded that what it needs is "strong links with the proletariat".

In 2000, when the party claimed reestablishment, it criticized some reports to the 8th congress of the CPI in 1995 for not being correct from the Marxist viewpoint and giving more privileges to the bourgeois nationalist groups. Sabah Mofidi described the party's position on political spectrum in 2016 as "radical left", adding that "in the line of the created changes in the practical thought of Marxism and indeed the indigenous Marxism accommodated with the place-time conditions of various societies, it has become more pragmatic and taken steps to realism".

It is currently a member of the Progressive Alliance which was formed in 2013 as an international association of social democratic and socialist parties.

== Armed activities ==
Komala Peshmerga
- Leader: Abdulla Mohtadi
- Dates active: 1979–1991; 2016–Present
- Headquarters: Sulaymaniyah, Sulaymaniyah Governorate, Kurdistan Region, Iraq
- Size: less than 1,000 members.
- Wars: 1979 Kurdish rebellion in Iran; Iran–Iraq War; KDPI–Komala conflict; Iran–PJAK conflict; Western Iran clashes

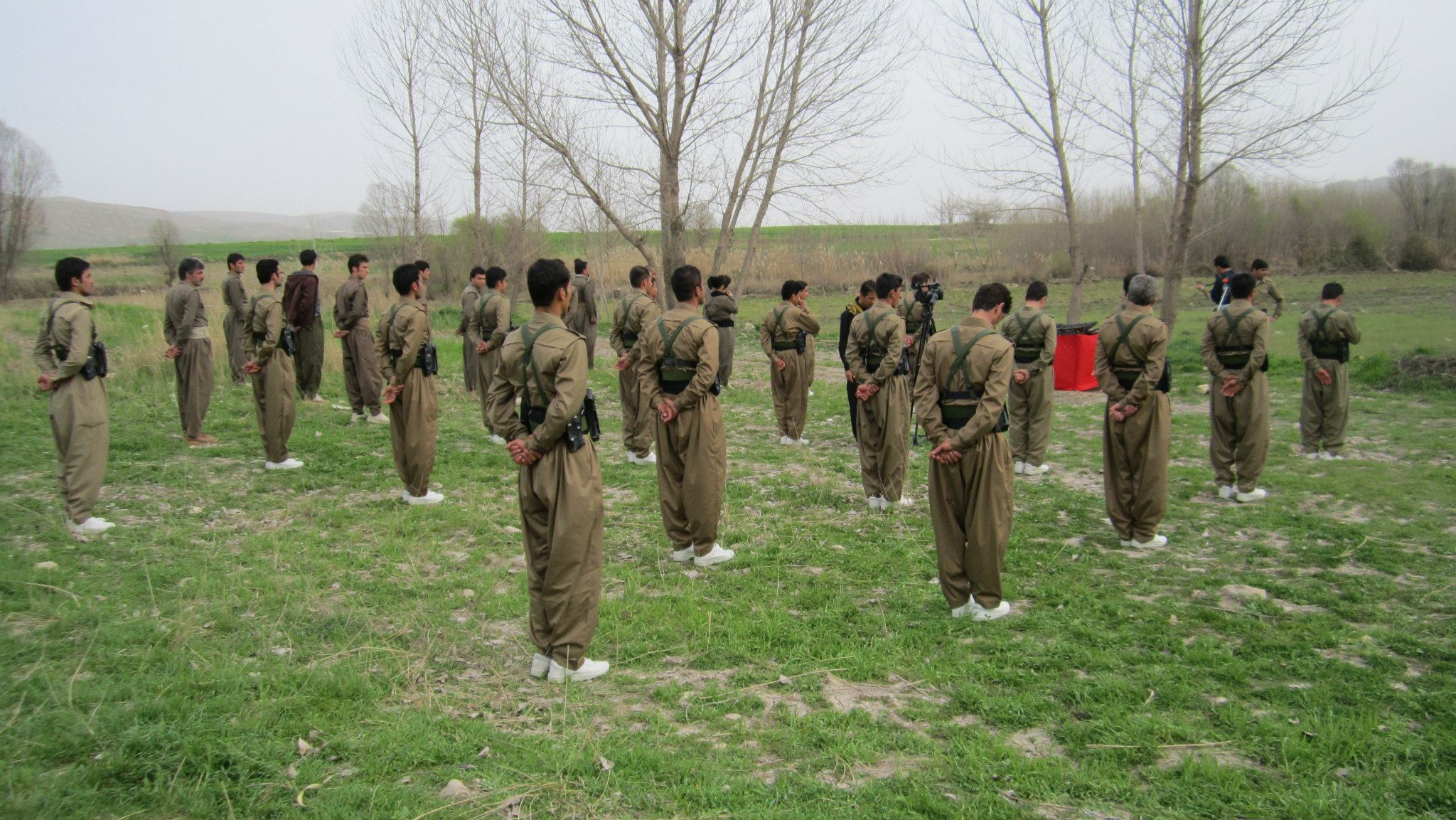
Komala Peshmerga in 2013

Following Iran–Iraq War, the group were stationed inside Iraqi soil and were supported by Saddam Hussein and his Ba'athist regime, who was willing to leverage insurgent groups against Tehran. Saddam gave the group money, logistical support and arms. After 1991, they found more secure sanctuaries under de facto autonomous Kurdistan Region.

Headquarters of the group is currently located in an installation in Zergwez, about a 20-minute drive southeast of Sulaymaniya. A European mission reported in 2012 that the camp has strict security measures at the entry gate. Their previous camp was located in the vicinity of Halabja, near Iran–Iraq border, but after they suffered from attacks by Iranian Armed Forces, they moved to the current place.

James Martin of The Jerusalem Post who visited the camp in 2007, wrote that Komala guerillas were equipped with AK-47s and RPGs, and are also trained in using anti-aircraft guns.

A report published by Combating Terrorism Center in 2017, estimated that the group has less than 1,000 members.

== Designation as a terrorist organization ==
Iran and Japan have listed Komala as a terrorist organization.

== Lobbying activities ==
In September 2018, the group opened an office in Washington D.C., and formally registered as a lobby organization in the United States, while it was reported to hold meetings with Congressmen from both parties since at least 2015. According to filed reports, Komala spent $7,500 in 2018 and in the next year, penned a $4,000 per month contract with the firm AF International, along with another worth $40,000 with Cogent Law Group. One-fourth of latter included working on an op-ed, advise to establish a charitable foundation in the U.S., and "develop" a Wikipedia page.
