= Wladimir van Wilgenburg =

Journalist and Author

- Education: Conflict studies and Kurdish studies
- Alma mater: Utrecht University
- Occupations: Journalist, author
- Notable work: The Kurds of Northern Syria

Wladimir van Wilgenburg is a Dutch journalist and author writing predominantly about Kurdistan. He has written for Al-Monitor, Kurdistan 24, Al-Jazeera, and Foreign Policy, amongst others. He lives in Erbil, Iraqi Kurdistan.

== Biography ==
His interest for the Kurds began early in secondary school, as he wrote a paper comparing Armenians and Kurds. Further on he wrote for the Kurdish focused blogs Azady.nl and Halwest.nl. In 2009, he began an internship at Rudaw in Iraqi Kurdistan. Van Wilgenburg received a Master of Arts in conflict studies from the University in Utrecht in 2011 and another one in Kurdish studies from Exeter University in 2013.

He is also a researcher for the Jamestown Foundation and his articles are published by the Atlantic Council. He lives in Erbil, Iraqi Kurdistan.

== Books ==
- The Kurds of Northern Syria: Governance, Diversity and Conflicts (with Harriet Allsopp), I.B. Tauris, London 2019
- Accidental Allies: The U.S.-Syrian Democratic Forces Partnership Against the Islamic State (with Michael Knights), I.B. Tauris, London 2021

== Controversies ==
He was prevented from entering Turkey twice, once in 2007 and another time in 2014. In 2014 he had a connecting flight at the Istanbul Airport on his way to the Sulaymaniyah Forum hosted in the American University, Iraqi Kurdistan.
