= September–October 2022 attacks on Iraqi Kurdistan =

Drone bombing campaign and missile strikes on Koya, Kurdistan Region, Iraq

September–November 2022 attacks on Iraqi Kurdistan
- Part of Kurdish-Iranian conflict, Mahsa Amini protests
- Location: Koya, Kurdistan Region, Iraq
- Date: September 28, 2022
- Target: Bases of the Democratic Party of Iranian Kurdistan and Komala of the Toilers of Kurdistan
- Attack type: Drone bombing campaign
- Deaths: 20 (per Kurdish officials)
- Injuries: 72 injured (per Kurdish officials); 4 Iraqi security officers (per Iraq)
- Perpetrators: IRGC; Islamic Revolutionary Guard Corps; Basij
- Motive: Targeting sites of Iranian Kurdish opposition groups whom Tehran accused of orchestrating protests after Mahsa Amini death

On September 28, 2022, the Islamic Revolutionary Guard Corps (IRGC) conducted drone, artillery and missile attacks against Iranian-Kurdish bases in Koya, northern Iraq. Sources reported at least 20 deaths and 72+ injuries.

The attack was a response to the Democratic Party of Iranian Kurdistan and other Kurdish groups calling for more protests in the Mahsa Amini protests, which Tehran accused of being foreign agents.

Gen. Hasan Hasanzadeh of the Revolutionary Guard said 185 Basijis, a volunteer force, were injured by "machete and knife" in the unrest. Hasanzadeh also said rioters broke the skull of one of the Basij members. He added that five Basijis are hospitalized in intensive care.

On September 28, the U.S. had also shot down an Iranian KOS Mohajem Al Wasl drone with an F-15 after it posed a threat to U.S. forces in the area.

Similar attacks continued in the coming days, and casualties have increased to 18 deaths and 62 injuries as of October 4. Among the killed was an American citizen mother and infant.

On November 14, Iranian airstrikes on the headquarters of Iranian Kurdish parties operating in Iraqi Kurdistan continued, killing at least two people and injuring 10 others. Iraq's Foreign Ministry, the Kurdistan Regional Government and the United States condemned the strikes.
