= Komala – Reform Faction =

Kurdish organisation

Organization of the Toilers of Kurdistan کۆمه‌ڵه‌ی زه‌حمه‌تکیشانی کوردستان
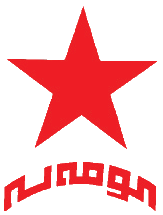
- General Secretary: Reza Kaabi
- Spokesperson: Fariba Mohammadi
- Founder: Omar Ilkhanizade
- Founded: October 2007; 18 years ago June 2023; 3 years ago (refounded)
- Split from: Komala Party of Iranian Kurdistan
- Headquarters: Sulaymaniyah, Kurdistan Region, Iraq
- National affiliation: Coalition of Political Forces of Iranian Kurdistan (2026–present)

Party flag

Website
- https://komele.org

The Organization of the Toilers of Kurdistan (Kurdish: کۆمه‌ڵه‌ی زه‌حمه‌تکیشانی کوردستان, Persian: کومله زحمتکشان کردستان), also known as the Komala – Reform Faction, is an armed separatist ethnic party of Kurds in Iran based in the Kurdistan Region of Iraq.

It split from the Komala Party of Iranian Kurdistan in October 2007 over internal disagreements but reunited with them in November 2022.

It was led by Omar Ilkhanizade and operated a television network named ASOsat.

On 21 June 2023, the alliance between the group and the Komala Party of Iranian Kurdistan collapsed. Following the collapse, the two clashed, and as a result of the infighting, two were killed and three were wounded. The clashes took place in Zargawez in Iraq's Kurdistan Region. Norway-based Kurdish human rights NGO Hengaw offered readiness to mediate between the two.

Following the 2025–2026 Iran protests the party became part of the Coalition of Political Forces of Iranian Kurdistan.

== See also ==
- Komala of Revolutionary Toilers of Iranian Kurdistan (1969/1979–1984)
  - Komala Kurdistan's Organization of the Communist Party of Iran (1984–present)
    - Komala Party of Iranian Kurdistan (2000–present)
      - Komala – Reform Faction (2007–present)
      - Komala Party of Iranian Kurdistan – Reunification Faction (2008–2014)
    - Socialist Faction of Komala (2009–2022)
