= Ibrahim Alizade =

Iranian Kurdish political leader

Ibrahim Alizadeh
- Born: 1950; Mahabad
- Organization: Komala Kurdistan's Organization of the Communist Party of Iran
- Spouse: Serwe Naseri
- Website: https://www.Komalah.org

Ibrahim Alizadeh is a Kurdish communist politician from Iran. He is the official spokesperson and first secretary of the Komala Kurdistan's Organization of the Communist Party of Iran (Komalah), which is part of the Iranian opposition.
