= Foad Mostafa Soltani =

Political activist (1948–1979)

Foad Mostafa-Soltani
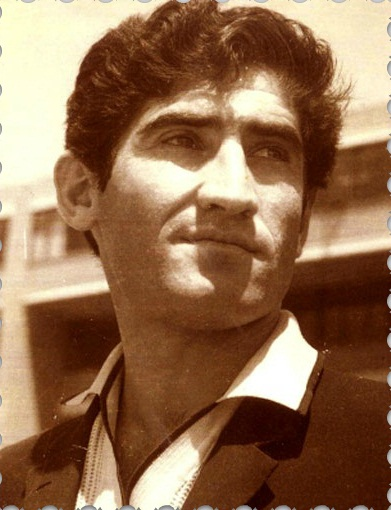
- Soltani as a student
- Born: 1948; Marivan, Iran
- Died: 31 August 1979 (aged 30–31); Bastam, Iran
- Other names: Kak Foad

Foad Mostafa Soltani (Persian: فؤاد مصطفی سلطانی; 1948 – 31 August 1979) was one of the founders of the Revolutionary Organisation of the Toilers of Kurdistan, popularly known as Komala.
