= Komalah (CPI) =

Kurdish branch of the Communist Party of Iran

Komala Kurdistan's Organization of the Communist Party of Iran
- First Secretary: Ibrahim Alizade
- Spokesperson: Ibrahim Alizade
- Founded: 1984
- Headquarters: Zrgwez, Iraqi Kurdistan
- Membership (2001/2008): 200
- Ideology: Communism; Kurdish minority interests
- Political position: Far-left
- Mother Party: Communist Party of Iran

Party flag
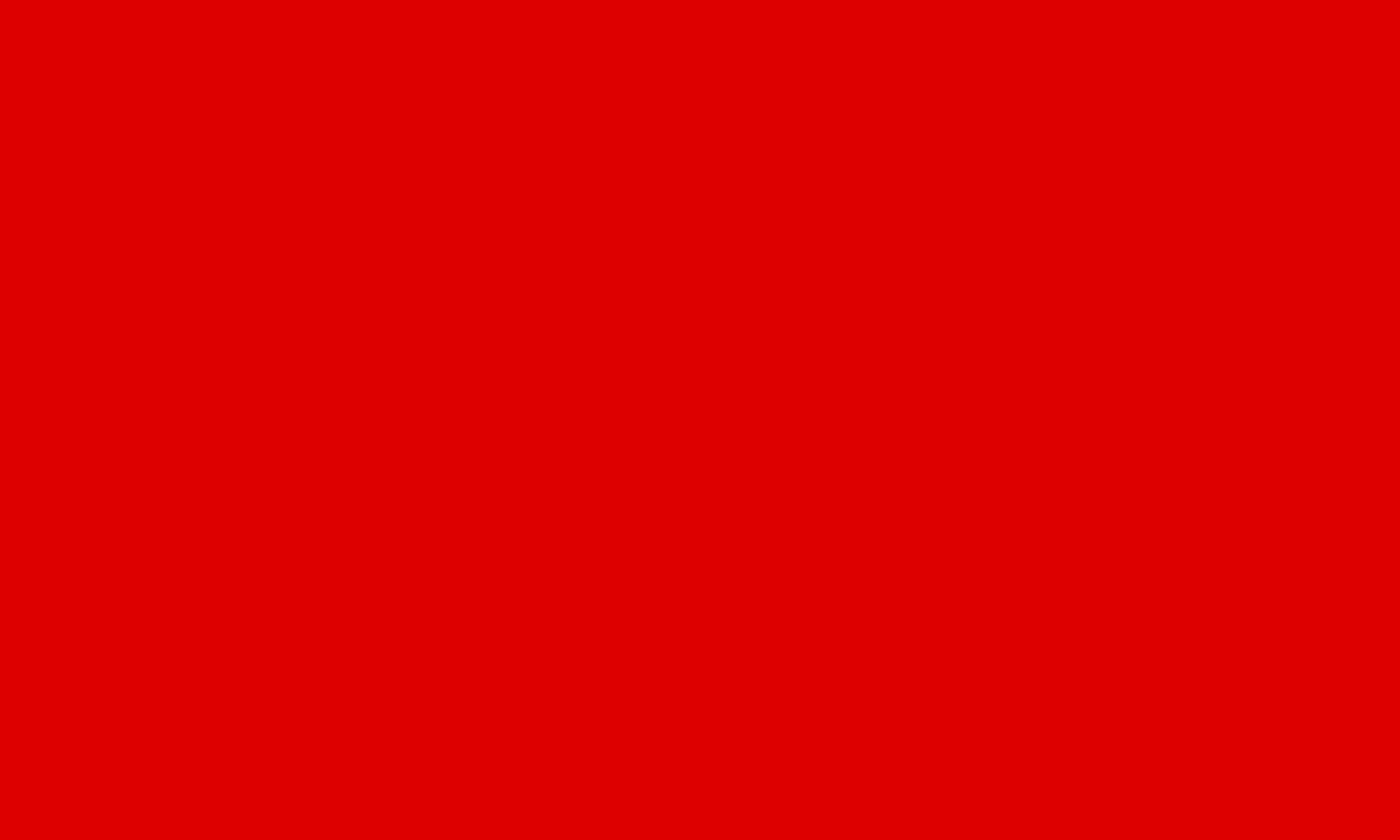

Website
- www.komalah.org

The Komala Kurdistan's Organization of the Communist Party of Iran (Kurdish: کۆمەڵە ڕێکخراوی کوردستانی حیزبی کۆمۆنیستی ئێران) is an Iranian Kurdish communist party active throughout the Iran–Iraq border. The party is led by Ibrahim Alizade and works as the Kurdish branch of Communist Party of Iran.

In 2009, a group of the party's cadre who identified only as socialists, left the party and established Socialist Faction of Komala.

On 19 February 2026, one party member was killed and two were injured when their vehicle came under attack from an Islamic Revolutionary Guard Corps drone.

== Designation as a terrorist organization ==
The following countries have listed Komola as a terrorist organization:

Country	Ref
Iran	
Japan	

== See also ==
- Komala of Revolutionary Toilers of Iranian Kurdistan (1969/1979–1984)
  - Komala Kurdistan's Organization of the Communist Party of Iran (1984–present)
    - Komala Party of Iranian Kurdistan (2000–present)
      - Komala – Reform Faction (2007–present)
      - Komala Party of Iranian Kurdistan – Reunification Faction (2008–2014)
    - Socialist Faction of Komala (2009–2022)
