= Kurds in Iran =

Kurdish people in Iran

Total population
- 9–10 million

Languages
- Kurdish, Gorani and Persian

Religion
- Shia Islam (Twelver); Sunni Islam (Shafi'i) (Sufi order Qadiriyya also present); Yarsanism

Related ethnic groups
- see Iranian peoples

Kurds in Iran (Kurdish: کورد لە ئێران, romanized: Kurdên Îranê, Persian: کردها در ایران) constitute a large minority in the country with a population of around 9 and 10 million people. Most Iranian Kurds are bilingual in Kurdish and Persian.

== Geography ==
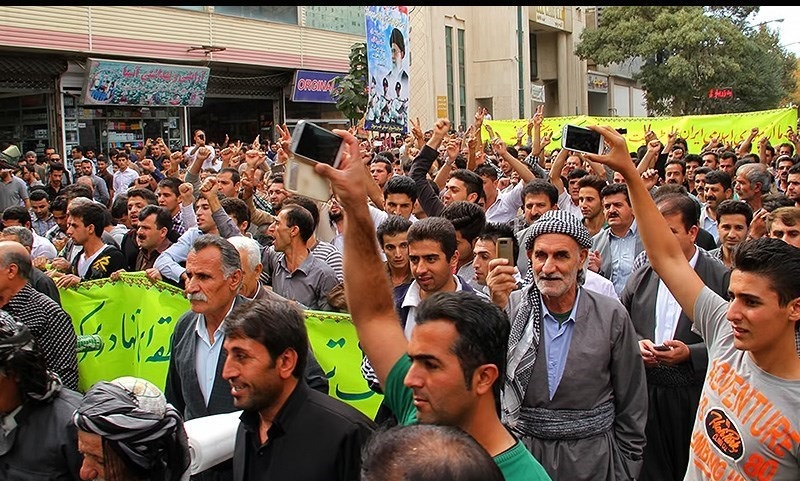
Iranian Kurds in Marivan protest against ISIL during the Siege of Kobanî, 6 October 2014

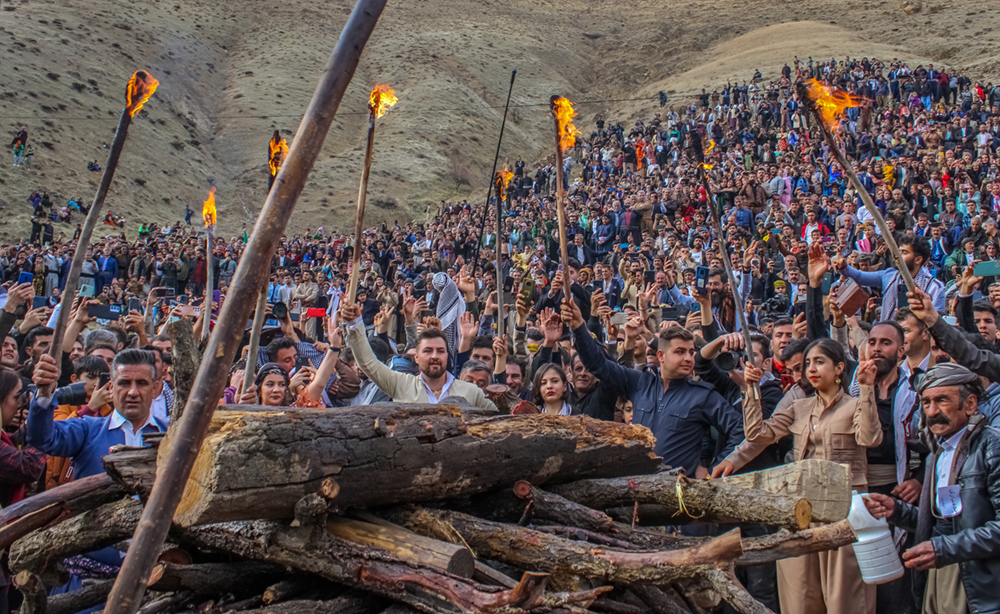
Kurds celebrating Newroz in Iranian Kurdistan, 2024

Iranian Kurdistan or Eastern Kurdistan (Rojhilatê Kurdistanê), is the parts of western Iran inhabited by Kurds which borders Iraq and Turkey. It includes the Kurdistan province, Kermanshah province, West Azerbaijan province, Ilam province, and Lorestan province.

Shia Feyli Kurds inhabit Kermanshah province, except for those parts where people are Jaff, and Ilam province; as well as some parts of Kurdistan and Hamadan provinces. The Kurds of Khorasan, in the North Khorasan province of northeastern Iran, are Shi'ite Muslims. The Lak tribe populate parts of Ilam province and Lorestan province, while Chegini Kurds reside in central Lorestan.

== Religion ==
The two major religions among Kurds in Iran are Islam and Yarsanism, while fewer Kurds adhere to Baháʼí Faith and Judaism. There is disagreement on which is the largest denomination among Kurds; experts such as Richard N. Frye and Martin van Bruinessen argue that Sunni Islam (the Shafi'i branch) is the majority religion, while researcher Anu Leinonen believes it is the Twelver branch of Shia Islam.

Pockets of Sunni Kurds belong to the Qadiriyya tariqa (around Marivan and Sanandaj). These orders have experienced repression from the state, including the destruction of their places of worship. Yarsanis are also targeted by the central government.

== Political history ==
=== Emergence of Kurdish nationalism ===
While Ottoman Kurdistan has been identified as the source of Kurdish national inspiration, Iranian Kurdistan has been identified as the ideological cradle for the emergence of Kurdish nationalism.

In Iran, Kurdish intellectual writings and poetry from the 16th and 17th century indicate that the Kurdish population in the country was aware of the necessity of Kurdish unity and the need to form political and administrative entities for Kurds. However, these calls for Kurdish unity did not reach the broader Kurdish population until the 20th century when it awakened and diffused as a response to the implementation of nation-state policies (Persianization) by changing Iranian rulers. These policies not only alienated Kurds but also excluded them from equal access to citizenship. An example was the Constitutional Revolution of 1905–1911, which elevated Persian above Kurdish by asserting it as official language, language of administration and language of education. Unlike other minorities in Iran, the Kurds were historically fascinated with Iranian intellectuals, chiefly because the Pahlavi government emphasis on pre-Islamic Iran had also strengthened Kurdish claims of Median descent.

=== Cross-border interaction (1918–1979) ===
Governor Abdol-Hossein Farmanfarma with the leaders of the Piran tribe: the 3rd from the right is Mohammad Amin Agha Piran, and the 5th from the right is Hamz Agha Mamash

Kurds have a strong cross-border ethnic linkage and few historical Kurdish rebellions were limited to the borders of a single country. For example, the rebellion of Sheikh Ubeydullah in Turkish Kurdistan around 1880 inspired Simko Shikak to rebel in 1918, while the various Barzani rebellions in Iraqi Kurdistan became a source of support for the Republic of Mahabad. Other examples of cross-border interaction include the subjugation of the Simko Shikak revolt forcing Simko to flee to Rawandiz in Iraqi Kurdistan – where he sought the support of Sheikh Mahmud Barzanji. Following the fall of the Republic of Mahabad in 1946, some of its leaders also fled to Iraqi Kurdistan where they were sheltered by the son of Sheikh Mahmud Barzanji. Mustafa Barzani had also supported the Republic of Mahabad by sending 2,100 soldiers which in turn also increased Kurdish self-confidence. Many teachers and military officers from Iraqi Kurdistan moreover crossed the border to support the republic.

In 1944, the Society for the Revival of the Kurds/Kurdistan (JK) considered the first Kurdish nationalist movement met with a Turkish Kurdish delegation and an Iraqi Kurdish delegation at the border area near Mount Dalanpar where they signed the Pact of Three Borders which demonstrated the existence of a strong Kurdish sense of cross-border solidarity and sentiment.

Cross-border interaction became difficult to sustain in the 1950s due to repression from SAVAK on the Iranian side. However, Kurds were able to reinforce the cross-border political activity, when the First Iraqi–Kurdish War commenced in 1961, as the Democratic Party of Iranian Kurdistan (KDPI) gave financial support and loyalty to their counterpart in Iraq, the Kurdistan Democratic Party (KDP), while KDPI themselves accessed spatial resources. Relations between KDP and KDPI would later deteriorate greatly as KDP became a close ally of SAVAK against Iraq. CIA documents from 1963 show that the KDP rebuffed support from KDPI due to the desire to maintain close relations with Iran.

In the 1970s, KDPI with Komalah and the Patriotic Union of Kurdistan (PUK) fought around Piranshahr, Sardasht, Baneh in the northern parts of Iranian Kurdistan against Iranian forces who received support from KDP.

=== Cross-border interaction after 1979 ===
After the Iranian revolution in 1979, political infighting among Kurds increased and KDPI and Komala fought over political and spatial influence in Iranian Kurdistan as they were fighting Iran together. In the 1980s, the two political and military groups had become powerful and cross-border interaction was therefore less important.

== Separatism or autonomy ==
Kurdish separatism in Iran or the Kurdish–Iranian conflict is an ongoing, long running dispute for full or partial autonomy between the Kurdish opposition in Western Iran and the governments of Iran, lasting since the emergence of Reza Shah Pahlavi in 1918.

During the Iranian revolution, Kurdish nationalist political parties were unsuccessful in attracting support, who at that time had no interest in autonomy. Since the 1990s, Kurdish nationalism in the region grew, partly due to anger at the government's violent suppression of Kurdish activism.

== Tribes ==
Tribe	Kurdish and Persian names	Geography	Notes
Ali Sherwan	Kurdish: عه‌لی شیروان; Persian: ئایل علیشروان	Ilam province	Southern Kurdish–speaking
Amar	Kurdish: عمار; Persian: عمارلو	Gilan province, Greater Khorasan and Qazvin province	Kurmanji–speaking
Arkawâzi	Kurdish: ئه‌رکه‌وازی; Persian: ارکوازی	Ilam province	Southern Kurdish–speaking
Badreh	Kurdish: بەدرە; Persian: بدره‌ای	Ilam province	
Balavand	Persian: بالاوند	Ilam province	
Beiranvand	Kurdish: Bîranwend ,بیرانوەند; Persian: بیرانوند	Between Aleshtar and Khorramabad; Bayranshahr.	Laki–speaking.
Chahardoli	Persian: چاردولی	Hamadan province and West Azerbaijan province	Laki–speaking
Chalabianlu	Persian: چلبیانلو	East Azerbaijan province	
Chegini	Kurdish: Çengînî ,چەگینی; Persian: چگنی	Between Khorramabad and the Kashgan river.	Chegini dialect (Mixture of Laki and Luri)
Dehbalai	Persian: بالایی	Ilam province	
Delikan	Persian: دلیکانلو	Ardabil province	Turkophone
Dilfan	Kurdish: Dilfan ,دیلفان; Persian: دلفان	Around Delfan County. Present in Ilam and Mazandaran provinces as well.	Laki–speaking
Donboli	Kurdish: Dimilî ,دونبەلی; Persian: دنبلی	Khoy and Salmas area.	Turkophone
Falak al-Din	Persian: فلک ئالدین	Hamadan province	Laki–speaking
Eyvan	Kurdish: ئه‌یوان; Persian: ايوان	Ilam province	
Feyli	Kurdish: Feylî ,فه‌یلی; Persian: فیلی	Ilam province (Ilam, Chardoval, Mehran, Malekshahi, Abdanan, Dehloran).	Southern Kurdish–speaking.
Ghiasvand	Persian: قیاسوند	Hamadan province	Laki–speaking
Guran	Kurdish: Goran ,گۆران; Persian: گوران	Hawraman region	Gorani–speaking.
Hasanvand	Kurdish: حەسەنوەند; Persian: حسنوند	Around Aligudarz, Khorramabad and Borujerd.	Laki–speaking.
Herki	Kurdish: Herkî ,ھەرکی; Persian: هرکی	Western countryside of Urmia in the Targavar and Margavar valleys.	Kurmanji–speaking.
Jaff	Kurdish: Caf ,جاف; Persian: جاف	From Sanandaj to Kermanshah with Javanrud as area of origin.	Sorani–speaking.
Jalali	Kurdish: Celalî ,جەلالیان; Persian: جلالی	Around Maku.	Kurmanji–speaking.
Jalilavand	Kurdish: Celalwend ,جەلیلوەند; Persian: جلیلوند	Around Dinavar and in Lorestan province.	Laki–speaking.
Kakavand	Kurdish: Kakewend ,کاکەوەن; Persian: کاکاوند	Kermanshah, Harsin area, and Kakavand District, Delfan.	Laki–speaking.
Kalhori	Kurdish: Kelhûr ,کەڵھوڕ; Persian: کلهر	Around Eslamabad-e Gharb, Qasr-e Shirin and Gilan-e Gharb. Ilam province (Chardoval and Eyvan)	Southern Kurdish–speaking.
Khezel	Kurdish: خه‌زه‌ل; Persian: خزل	Ilam province	Southern Kurdish–speaking
Kolivand	Persian: كليوند	Ilam province	
Kordshuli	Kurdish: Kurdşûlî; Persian: کردشولی	Fars province	Laki–speaking
Kuruni	Kurdish: Kûranî; Persian: کورونی	Fars province	
Malekshahi	Kurdish: Melekşahî; Persian: ملکشاهی	Ilam province	Southern Kurdish–speaking
Mamash	Kurdish: Mamaş ,مامش; Persian: مامش	Southern parts of West Azerbaijan.	Sorani–speaking.
Mangur	Kurdish: Mangûr ,مەنگوڕ; Persian: منگور	Around Piranshahr, Mahabad, Sardasht and Bukan in West Azerbaijan.	Sorani–speaking.
Milan	Kurdish: Mîlan ,میلان; Persian: میلان	North of Zurabad in northern West Azerbaijan	Kurmanji–speaking.
Mukri	Kurdish: Mukrî ,موکری; Persian: مکری	Around Baneh, Mahabad, Piranshahr and Saqqez.	Sorani–speaking.
Musavand	Persian: موسی وند	Hamadan province	Laki–speaking
Qolugjan		Ardabil province	
Reşwan	Kurdish: Reşwan ,ڕەشوان; Persian: رشوند	Gilan province, Greater Khorasan and Qazvin province	Kurmanji–speaking
Rizehvand	Persian: ریزه وند	Ilam province	
Sanjâbi	Kurdish: Sencabî ,سنجاوی; Persian: سنجابی	Western parts of Kermanshah province.	Southern Kurdish-speaking.
Shaqaqi	Kurdish: Şeqaqî ,شەقاقی; Persian: شقاقی	East Azerbaijan province	
Shatran	Persian: شاترانلو	Ardabil province	
Shekak	Kurdish: Şikak ,شکاک; Persian: شکاک	Western countryside of Urmia.	Kurmanji–speaking.
Shuhan	Persian: شوهان	Ilam province	Southern Kurdish–speaking
Torkashvand	Persian: ترکاشوند	Hamadan province	Laki–speaking
Uriad	Persian: اوریاد	Fars province	
Zangana	Kurdish: Zengine ,زەنگەنە; Persian: زنگنه	South of Kermanshah.	Southern Kurdish–speaking.
Zola	Kurdish: زۆلا; Persian: زوله	Hamadan province	Laki–speaking

== See also ==
- Ardalan
- Kolbar
- Mokryan
- List of Iranian Kurds
- A Modern History of the Kurds by David McDowall

== Bibliography ==
- Hassaniyan, Allan (2021), Kurdish Politics in Iran, Cambridge University Press, doi:10.1017/9781009029971, ISBN 9781009029971, S2CID 241171409
