= United States–Saudi strikes on Iraqi militias =

2026 airstrikes in Iraq

- Part of the Iran–Saudi Arabia proxy conflict, the 2026 United States-led conflict with pro-Iranian Iraqi militias, and the 2026 Iran war
- Locations of reported US–Saudi airstrikes in Iraq
Date	July 29, 2026
Location	Nineveh, Basra, Wasit, Diyala, Saladin, Karbala, Kirkuk, Baghdad governorates of Iraq
Status	Ended

Belligerents
United States; Saudi Arabia	Popular Mobilization Forces; Islamic Resistance in Iraq

Units involved
CENTCOM; Saudi Arabian Armed Forces; Royal Saudi Air Force	Unknown

Casualties and losses
None reported	20 PMF fighters killed, 32 injured 4 IRGC members killed (per Iranian state media)

On 29 July 2026, Saudi Arabia in coordination with United States Central Command (CENTCOM) conducted a series of joint airstrikes against sites belonging to the Popular Mobilization Forces (PMF) and other Iran-backed Iraqi militias. The PMF said at least 20 of its members were killed and 32 wounded in the strikes, which hit sites across several Iraqi provinces. The operation coincided with an Iranian missile barrage against a US base in Jordan, which Jordanian forces said was fully intercepted.

CENTCOM and the Saudi Ministry of Defense said the strikes targeted "terrorist logistics and weapons sites" linked to Iran-aligned militants, while the Islamic Resistance in Iraq denied any involvement in the earlier drone attacks and called the Saudi allegations "fabrications," and Iraq's leadership condemned the operation as a violation of the country's sovereignty. In August 2026, politicians in Iraq alleged that Falih Al-Fayyad, the current head of the PMF, had prior knowledge of the attack but did not warn the targeted factions.

== Background ==
The strikes came amid a broader escalation tied to the 2026 Iran war, fought between the United States and Israel on one side and Iran on the other since late February 2026. Saudi Arabia's Ministry of Defense said it intercepted and destroyed more than thirty drones launched from Iraqi territory over 27–28 July 2026, targeting oil facilities in Riyadh and the Eastern Province. Riyadh blamed the Islamic Resistance in Iraq and Iran-aligned factions, which denied responsibility and suggested that Houthi forces in Yemen—who separately claimed attacks on Saudi oil infrastructure and a Saudi oil tanker—may have carried out some of the strikes instead.

The operation was the first major US military action in the Middle East since 24 July 2026, when President Donald Trump suspended a 13-day bombing campaign against Iran. It also marked the first time Saudi Arabia had publicly acknowledged conducting strikes inside Iraq since the war began, a shift one Riyadh-based security analyst attributed to a belief that visible retaliation, rather than unacknowledged action, was needed to change militia behavior.

Separately and around the same time, Iran fired missiles at a US base in Jordan; Jordan's military said five missiles were intercepted and destroyed, with no casualties or damage reported.

=== PMF chairman's prior knowledge ===
In August 2026, senior members of the Asaib Ahl al-Haq militia alleged that the current chairman of the Popular Mobilisation Forces, Falih al-Fayyad, was informed of the attacks by prime minister Ali al-Zaidi an hour before. They further alleged that Fayyad did not inform those factions that were targeted beforehand, and called for a parliamentary hearing to be held on this issue. The Popular Mobilisation Commission later released a statement denying the allegations.

== Strikes ==
In the early hours of 29 July 2026 Baghdad time (late Tuesday, 28 July, US time), CENTCOM and the Saudi Ministry of Defense announced joint airstrikes described by CENTCOM as targeting "terrorist logistics and weapons sites" in eastern Iraq. Reports indicated the strikes hit PMF positions across several provinces, with the deadliest strike in Nineveh, along with sites in Basra, Wasit, Diyala, Saladin, Karbala, Kirkuk and Baghdad. The PMF's Nineveh Operations Command said the strikes hit, among other targets, the headquarters of its 4th Battalion, 30th Brigade, and its anti-armor directorate in the Nineveh Plain area.

The Saudi Ministry of Defense said its forces carried out "precise and targeted strikes against objectives belonging to those militias located on the territory of the Republic of Iraq and linked to the attacks on petroleum facilities in the Kingdom," adding that "the Kingdom emphasizes that it does not seek escalation but will respond to any aggression it faces."

== Casualties ==
The PMF's toll rose over the course of the day. It initially reported eight of its members killed and four wounded, while Reuters cited local medical and PMF sources reporting at least ten killed. By 30 July, the standing figure confirmed by the PMF was at least 20 killed and 32 wounded across seven governorates.

Additionally, Iranian state news agency reports cited by international media indicated that four members of the Islamic Revolutionary Guard Corps (IRGC) were killed in airstrikes targeting Diyala Governorate. Unnamed Iraqi militia officials also told the Associated Press that six Iranian military advisers were killed in separate strikes. As of 31 July 2026, no official toll independent of militia and Iranian reports has been released.

== Reactions ==
=== Popular Mobilization Forces ===
The PMF, a coalition of mostly Shia armed groups formally integrated into Iraq's security forces, described the strikes as "a highly dangerous escalation, a violation of Iraq's sovereignty, and an attack on its official security institutions," and reported damage to buildings and military equipment. Funerals were held in Mosul for fighters killed in the strikes, and PMF supporters held rallies in Baghdad demanding the withdrawal of US forces from the country.

=== Iraqi government ===
The office of Iraqi President Nizar Amidi condemned the airstrikes, describing them as "an unacceptable attack and a blatant violation of Iraq's sovereignty, targeting its official security institutions."

Iraq's National Security Council also issued a statement condemning the operation, noting that the strikes were carried out while the Iraqi government was in active contact with Saudi and American officials to investigate and address concerns regarding drone launches from Iraqi territory.

=== Islamic Resistance in Iraq ===
The Islamic Resistance in Iraq, a coalition of Iran-aligned armed factions, denied any role in the drone attacks on Saudi Arabia, calling the Saudi allegations "fabrications" and warning that Saudi action against it would be met with a harsh response.

== See also ==
- Iraq in the 2026 Iran war
- Saudi Arabia in the 2026 Iran war
- 2026 United States–Israeli strikes on Iraq
