= 2026 Iranian strikes on the Kurdistan Region =

2026 Iranian strikes on the Kurdistan Region (Iraq)
- Part of the 2026 Iran war, Iraq in the 2026 Iran war and 2026 Kurdish–Iranian crisis
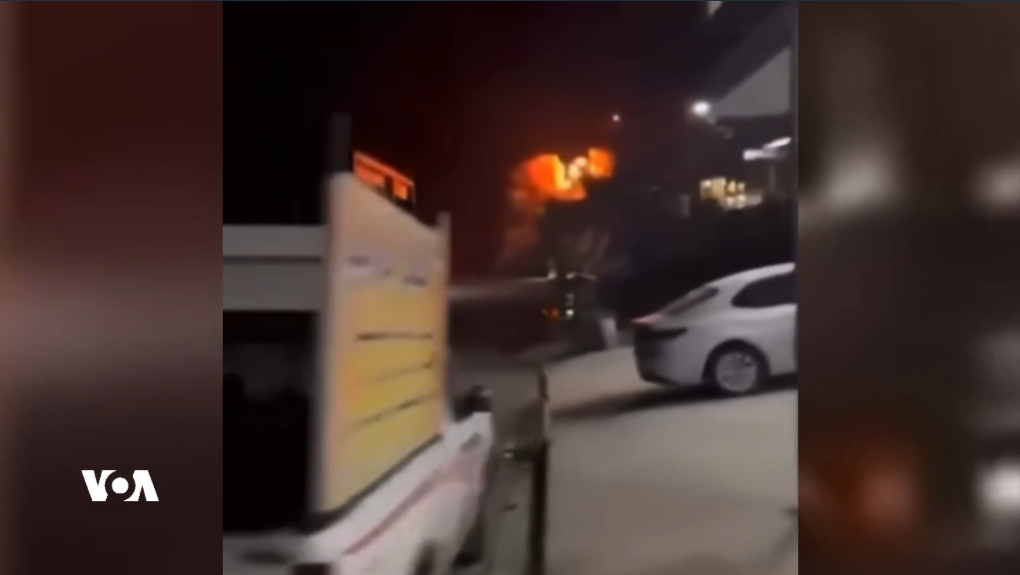
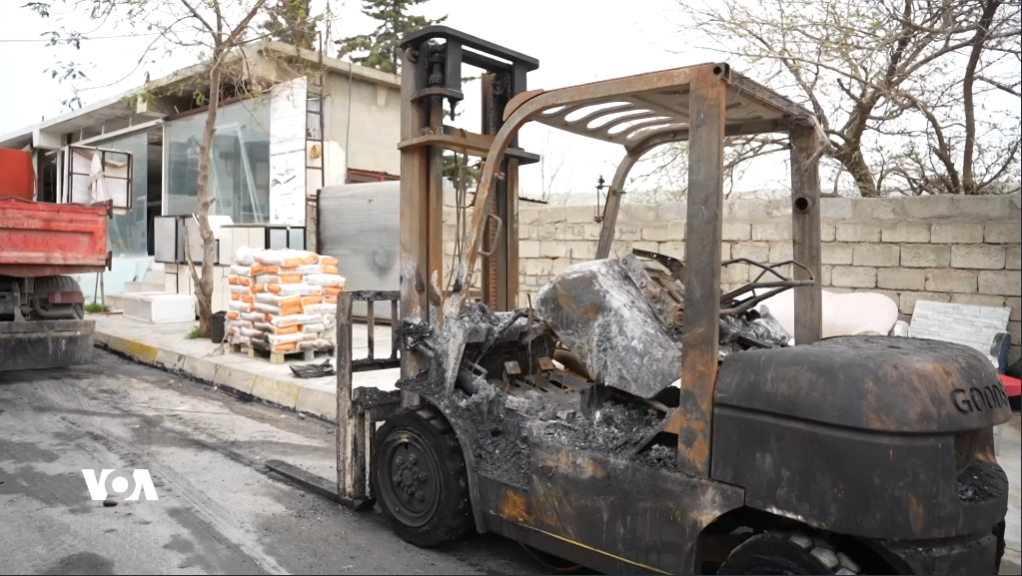
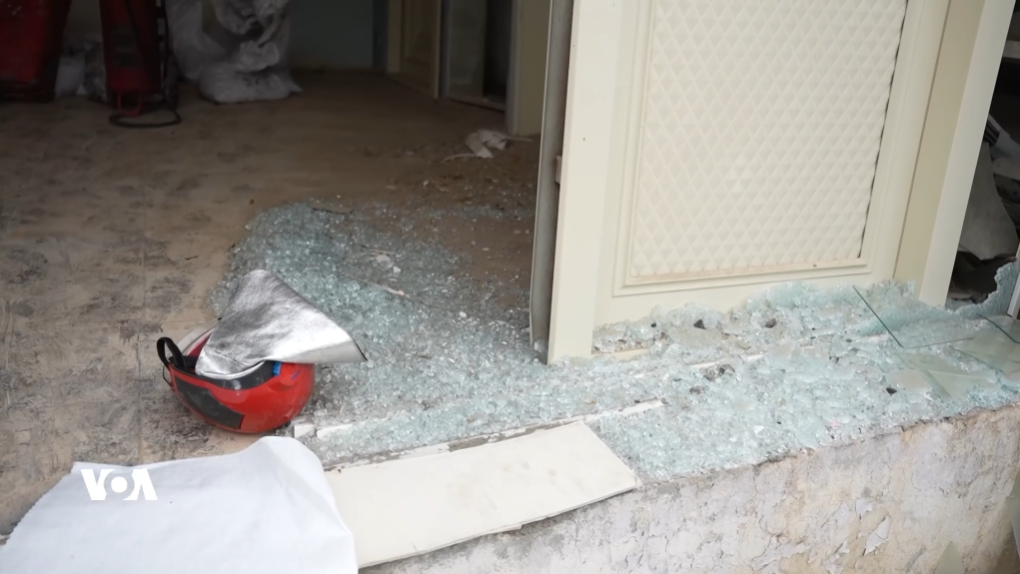
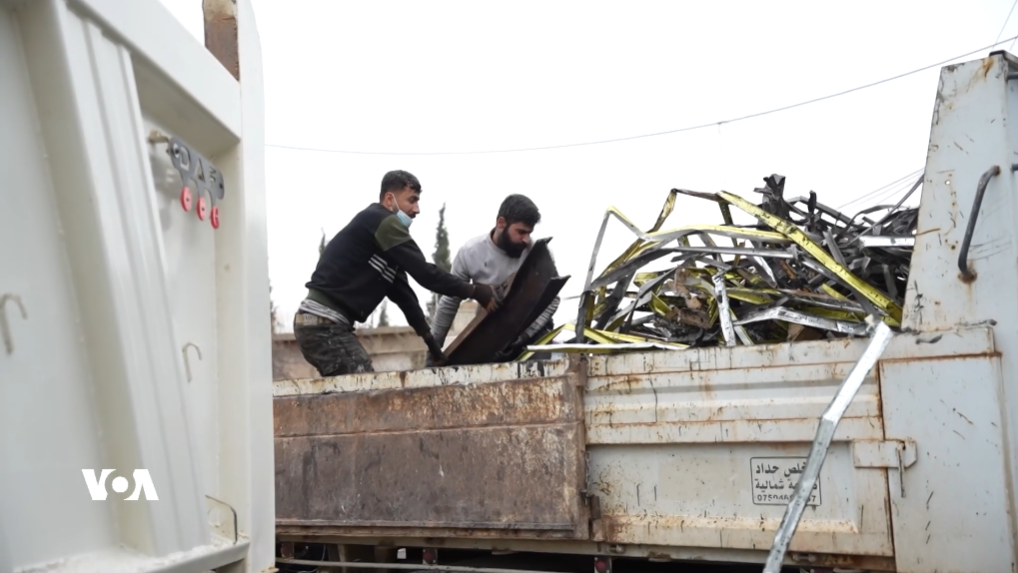
- Clockwise from top left: blast; burnt-out forklift; glass and rubble; workers cleaning up after Iranian attacks in the Kurdistan Region.
Date	28 February 2026 – present (7 months, 3 weeks and 1 day)
Location	Kurdistan Region, Iraq
Status	Ongoing

Belligerents
Iran; Axis of Resistance; Popular Mobilization Forces; Islamic Resistance in Iraq	Kurdistan Region; United States; Coalition of Political Forces of Iranian Kurdistan; Defensive only: United Kingdom; France; Italy; Iraq

Units involved
Turkmen Brigades; Saraya Awliya al-Dam; Ashab al-Kahf; Jaysh al-Ghadab; Rijal al-Bas al-Shadid	Democratic Party of Iranian Kurdistan; Kurdistan Freedom Party; Kurdistan Free Life Party; Organization of Iranian Kurdistan Struggle; Komala of the Toilers of Kurdistan; Komala Party of Iranian Kurdistan; Komala–CPI

Strength
Ballistic missiles; Shahed drones; Hadid 110; F-4 jets (alleged); F-5 jets (alleged)	Dassault Rafale; MIM-104 Patriot; Raytheon Coyote; C-RAM; British Rapid Sentry (SHORAD)

Casualties and losses
At least 60 killed and 100 wounded (from US airstrikes); 1 rocket mounted technical destroyed	8 Peshmerga killed, 44+ injured; 1 Asayish killed, 3 injured; 20 fighters killed, several injured; (United States) 2 soldiers killed; (United Kingdom) 1 soldier killed; 1 soldier killed, 7 injured
- 3 Kurdish civilians killed, 7 injured (Note: 2 Kurdish civilians killed and 7 injured, 1 Kurdish civilian killed)

On 28 February 2026, following the 2026 Iran war, the Islamic Republic of Iran and Iraqi Iran-aligned Shi'ite militias, primarily operating under the umbrella of the Popular Mobilization Forces (PMF), launched a series of ballistic missile and drone attacks against the Kurdistan Region (KRI), Iraq.

Most of the attacks in Iraq, around 200 as of 11 March 2026, have focused on the Iraqi Kurdistan Region. The region hosts the majority of US forces after troops withdrew from several facilities located in central and western Iraq.

The pro-Iran Shi'ite militia groups, Saraya Awliya al-Dam, the Islamic Resistance in Iraq, Jaysh al-Ghadab, Rijal al-Bas al-Shadid, and Ashab al-Kahf, claimed responsibility for some of the attacks.

== Background ==
The Kurdistan Region of Iraq has hosted several U.S. military bases and installations since the 2003 invasion of Iraq. Between 2020–2021 and again in 2025–2026, the United States undertook withdrawal processes from Iraq. During these phases, U.S. forces were not withdrawn from the Kurdistan Region but instead redeployed there, including troops relocated from the Autonomous Administration of North and East Syria, leading to a significant concentration of U.S. personnel and equipment in the region.

Iran has previously attacked the Kurdistan Region under the pretext of targeting "Mossad headquarters," including during the 2022 Erbil missile attacks and strikes in 2024. Meanwhile, its allied Shi'ite militias, operating in the no man's land between federal Iraq and the Kurdistan Region, have repeatedly attacked U.S. bases in the past. In 2025, a Shi'ite militia drone strike hit the Khor Mor gas field, causing a massive fire and highlighted the KRI's need for improved air defense systems.

The Kurdistan Region also hosts several Iranian Kurdish opposition parties in exile. These groups have previously launched cross-border attacks into Iran and have themselves been targeted by Iranian drone and missile strikes, including in 2018 and 2022. United under the Coalition of Political Forces of Iranian Kurdistan, they stated during the 2025–2026 Iranian protests that they would seek to help topple the Iranian regime and assume authority in Iranian Kurdistan in the event of U.S. military action.

== Timeline ==
=== Overview of initial strikes (28 February–mid-March) ===
On the same day that the 2026 Iran war began, the Kurdistan Region, particularly its capital, Erbil, quickly became a major target for Iranian attacks. Repeated explosions, air-raid sirens, and interceptions could at times be heard for more than two hours straight and were notably more sustained in intensity than previous strikes on the KRI. In the first three days, Erbil alone was targeted by more than 70 missiles and drones, however, U.S. and British air defense systems in the region intercepted the majority of them, resulting in little to no damage.

Prominent sites targeted included Erbil International Airport, where U.S. forces of the International Coalition against ISIS are based, and the U.S. Consulate General in Erbil, which opened in late 2025 and is the largest U.S. consulate in the world. Outside of Erbil, U.S. forces were also targeted at the Harir Air Base.

The attacks also targeted the headquarters of the 11th Brigade of the Peshmerga, located near the Degala subdistrict in Erbil Governorate, and the headquarters of the Peshmerga's Unit 70 Command, affiliated with the Patriotic Union of Kurdistan (PUK). The attacks resulted in the death of one member of the Asayish and the injury of another.

Iranian Kurdish opposition groups in the Sulaymaniyah Governorate (Sulaymaniyah City, Zargwez area, and Dukan District), and Erbil Governorate (Pirde, Koya District, Gomaspan, Khabat District) including the Kurdistan Freedom Party (PAK), the Democratic Party of Iranian Kurdistan (PDKI), the Komala of the Toilers of Kurdistan, the Organization of Iranian Kurdistan Struggle, and the Komala Kurdistan's Organization of the Communist Party of Iran (CPI) were targeted as well. On 3 March, strikes on PDKI bases intensified, resulting in the minor injury of one member.

Other targets included civilian areas in Soran District, Shaqlawa District, civilian infrastructure, like hotels, energy infrastructure, public facilities, and telecommunications and weather stations on Mount Korek and Mount Zamnako. In Duhok Governorate the Chamanke oil fields were targeted by two drones.

=== Mid March–7 April ===
Videos obtained by Voice of America Kurdî showing a drone strike by Iran-aligned militias targeting residential buildings in the Kurdistan Region.

On 12 March, a missile hit an Italian military base in Erbil. No injuries were reported. The same day another attack took place on a training camp used by French troops deployed in Erbil, one soldier was killed and six were wounded.

On 15 March, three IRGC missiles hit a camp of the Iranian-Kurdish opposition group Komala in the Kurdistan Region.

On 24 March, a rocket attack in Erbil which targeted a Peshmerga military base killed six fighters and injured at least 30.

==== Attacks on Nechirvan and Masoud Barzani's residences ====
On 28 March, the residence of Kurdistan Region President Nechirvan Barzani was targeted in a drone attack in Dohuk. The following day, Reuters reported that air defenses intercepted a drone near the residence of former Kurdish president Masoud Barzani in Erbil. The incidents were widely viewed as a significant escalation, crossing a "red line" and serving as a political message aimed at undermining the Kurdistan Region's neutrality and mediator role in the conflict, and drew widespread international condemnation.

A U.S. Embassy security alert on 29 March warned that Iran and its aligned militias might target American universities in Sulaymaniyah and Duhok, as well as other institutions associated with the United States in the Kurdistan Region.

By late March 2026, the Kurdistan Region was struck by "more than 450 drones and missiles."

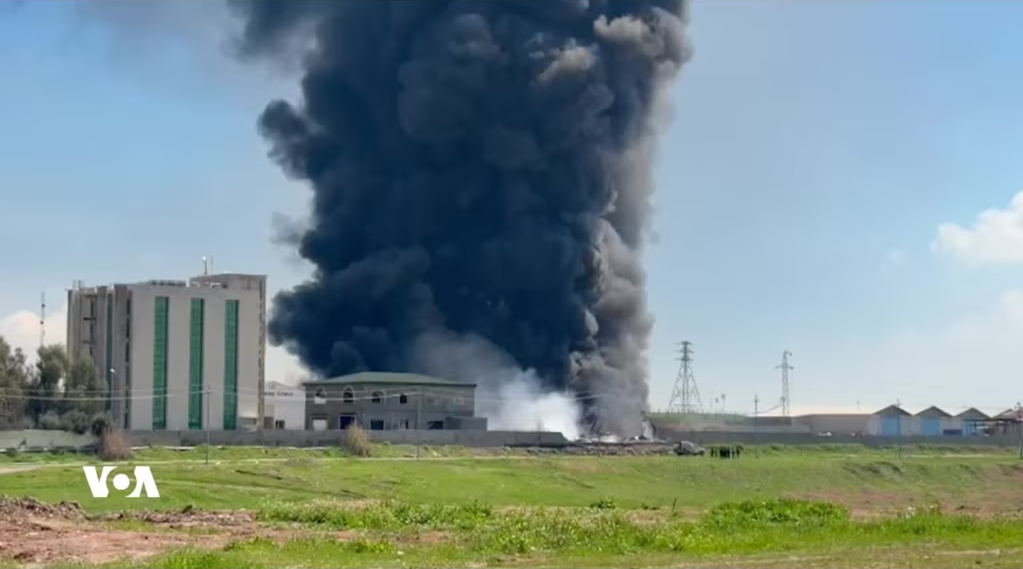
Burning industrial facility in the Kurdistan Region after drone and missile strikes.

On 1 April, three Iranian Shahed drones struck facilities linked to the British oil company Castrol near Erbil, causing damage to energy infrastructure but no reported casualties. On the same day, another drone attack targeted the Sarsang oilfield in the Chamanke sub-district of Duhok Governorate, which is operated by the U.S.-based HKN Energy.

On 2 April, two drones destroyed a charcoal factory in Erbil.

On 5 April, two drones struck densely populated residential areas in the Bakhtiyari neighbourhood of Sulaymaniyah.

On 7 April, a drone struck the home of a family in the rural Darashakran subdistrict north of Erbil, killing a married couple and leaving behind their children. The Counter Terrorism Department said the drone was "launched from Iran," and the attack drew widespread condemnation from Kurdish leaders.

=== Iran war ceasefire (8 April–21 April) ===
Despite the 2026 Iran war ceasefire, the Kurdistan Region continued to come under Iranian attacks.

On 14 April, a camp belonging to the PDKI near Koya, as well as two camps belonging to the Komala of the Toilers of Kurdistan in Sulaymaniyah and Erbil governorates, were targeted by Iranian one-way attack drones, injuring two members. Additional drones were intercepted by fighter jets.

==== Death of Ghazal Mawlan ====
Ghazal Mawlan, an 18-year-old female member of the Komala of the Toilers of Kurdistan, succumbed to wounds sustained in an Iranian strike on 14 April. Her death sparked controversy and public backlash after reports that she was turned away from multiple private hospitals in Sulaymaniyah, allegedly due to fears of Iranian repercussions, which may have contributed to her death. She initially received treatment at Shorsh Hospital, under the Ministry of Peshmerga Affairs, but due to the severity of her injuries required transfer to specialized care. She was transported by ambulance from Shorsh Hospital, accompanied by a Komala member and a Shorsh Hospital doctor. Arriving at Asia Hospital, staff reportedly refused admission, stating they could not "handle the case." At nearby Bakhshin Hospital, she was also denied treatment due to lack of "police authorization." Its director said he was in contact with security officials seeking approval. After a 20-minute delay, Mawlan and her companions left to seek another hospital. Another private facility reportedly ended the call after learning she was a Komala Peshmerga, while Faruq Hospital agreed to admit her about five minutes after the initial call. However, she had already died upon arrival. It was also reported that local mosques denied access for traditional burial rites and public cemeteries initially refused her burial. Around 150 Kurdish thinkers, artists, and civil society activists condemned the hospitals' actions in a joint statement. The Independent Commission for Human Rights in the Kurdistan Region described the denial of medical care as a violation of the right to life. The incident also prompted protests organized by Kurdish diaspora communities, while some local residents reportedly threatened to set up protest tents. Abdullah Mohtadi called for de-escalation and urged authorities to address public frustration. Pro-KDP media outlets attributed responsibility to the regional authorities, referring to the Patriotic Union of Kurdistan (PUK), Islamist parties, and affiliated hospitals, and criticized what they described as double standards. They stated that an "enemy soldier" would be treated, with an "emir" visiting him and "jash parliamentarians" attending to him, whereas a Kurdish fighter would not receive the same treatment.

From 15 to 16 April, five separate drone attacks targeted the Kurdistan Region. One such attack targeted the PAK, which said that no casualties were incurred.

On 17 April, Iranian drone attacks on a PDKI camp in Balisan, east of Shaqlawa, and in the Jazhnikan area killed three members, including two women, and injured several others.

=== Iran war ceasefire extension (21 April–17 June) ===
On 22 April, PAK claimed that an Iranian drone attack on one of its bases resulted in three injuries.

In May, reports continued of Iranian drone and missile strikes in the region. During the month, Iran declared the region a site of "hostile bases", similar to the designation it had previously applied to the United Arab Emirates (UAE).

On 8 June, the IRGC launched another round of strikes on Kurdish opposition headquarters in the region.

=== Islamabad Memorandum (17 June–7 July) ===
Following the signing of the Islamabad Memorandum, hostilities between the US, Israel, and Iran largely ceased. However, Iranian attacks on the Kurdistan Region and Kurdish opposition groups based there continued.

On 1 July, coinciding with clashes between PJAK and the IRGC in western Iran, the PDKI claimed that Iran had targeted one of its camps in the KRI.

=== Renewed hostilities (8 July–present) ===
On 13 July, three drones struck a camp housing Iranian-Kurdish refugees in the Darashakran area of Erbil Governorate, causing no casualties.

On 15 July, several drones were intercepted over Erbil.

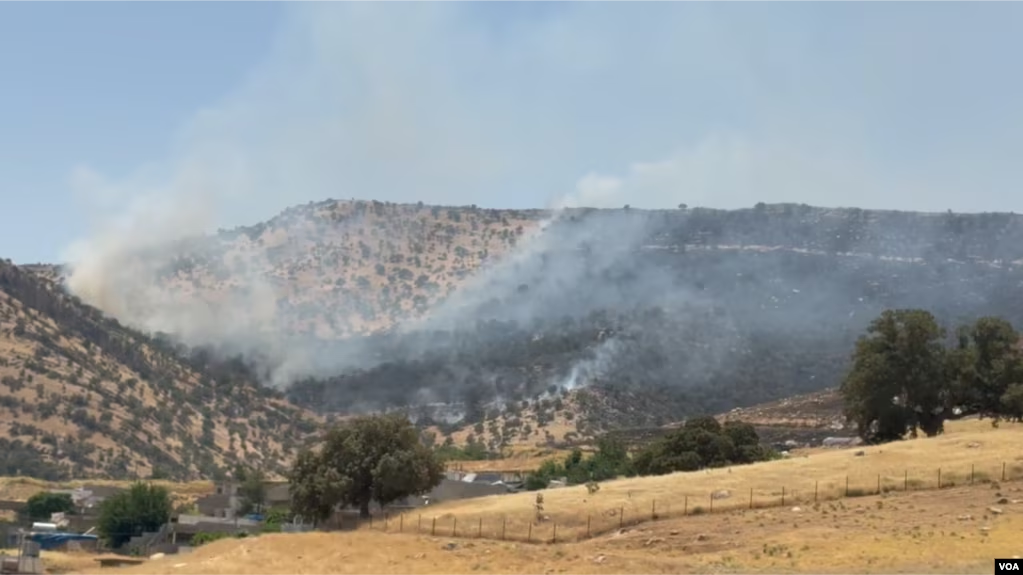
Burning forest after Iranian strikes on the Komala of the Toilers of Kurdistan's Zirgwez camp near Sulaymaniyah.

On 17 July, Iranian strikes on a Komala of the Toilers of Kurdistan party camp near Sulaimaniyah killed 10 members and injured more. A weapons depot in Tasluja, also near Sulaimaniyah, was struck, triggering a major explosion. Erbil was targeted throughout the day and into the night, with US-led coalition forces shooting down eight drones.

On 19 July, the United States Central Command (CENTCOM) announced that an American service member was killed in northern Iraq during a "controlled detonation" of a downed Iranian drone. In addition, the PAK reported that eight of its fighters were wounded after an Iranian drone hit a camp near Erbil. The group also alleged that Iran had used white phosphorus munitions in the attack. Hengaw expressed grave concern over the reports and called on international organizations to conduct an independent on-site investigation.

On 21 July, three drones were intercepted over Erbil by the air defenses of the US Consulate General in Erbil.

On 27 July, the opposition groups Komala of Toilers of Kurdistan and PAK were targeted in a series of drone attacks across Erbil Governorate throughout the day.

On 31 July, five Iranian drones targeted positions of the Komala of the Toilers of Kurdistan and the KDPI near Topzawa, Bashiqa, and Koya. Only material damage was reported.

On 1 August, two Iranian drones targeted the headquarters of the Komala of the Toilers of Kurdistan in the Dokan District, Sulaymaniyah Governorate. No casualties were reported.

In the early hours of 2 August, two drones targeted military bases in the Tasluja military zone, near Sulaymaniyah, home to the PUK Peshmerga's Unit 70, which had previously been targeted on 17 July. The drones were reportedly intercepted by security forces at the bases, with one crashing nearby and causing a fire.

On 11 August, Iranian strikes targeted the Komala of the Toilers of Kurdistan in Erbil's Alana Valley, injuring two members. The following day, Iranian strikes targeted the KDPI in Balisan, Erbil Governorate.

On 12 August, four drones crashed in the Soran area, one of which landed on a civilian house, causing material damage.

On 14 August, the US-led Coalition intercepted drones over Erbil.

==== Attacks on Masrour Barzani and Parastin leadership ====
On 17 August, the Counter Terrorism Department reported that Hadid-110, known as Iran's fastest stealth drones, launched from Iranian territory had targeted the office of Kurdistan Region Prime Minister Masrour Barzani and the residence of the director of Parastin in Pirmam, Erbil Governorate. This marked the second incident in which Iran targeted KRG leadership, following attacks against Nechirvan and Masoud Barzani in late March.

On 14 September, five missiles struck three areas in Sulaymaniyah Governorate. According to the Asayish, the attack caused no significant damage, apart from several small fires.

On 28 and 30 September, Iranian drones targeted KDPI camps in Koya. No casualties were reported.

== Response ==
=== Kurdistan Region ===
In a precautionary step, the Khor Mor gas field halted gas supplies to power stations in the Kurdistan Region over fears of being targeted by strikes, leading to electricity blackouts.

In response to the targeting of one of its military bases, the Peshmerga warned that "the continuation of these terrorist acts will not go unanswered." A similar statement was issued a month later, reiterating that if the Iraqi government failed to act against "terrorist groups" targeting the Kurdistan Region with drone and missile attacks, the Ministry of Peshmerga Affairs (MoPA) would be "compelled to adopt a different stance" from its current restraint.

The Kurdistan Regional Government (KRG) subsequently suspended official working hours in all schools, universities, and institutes across the region from 1 to 4 March. The Counter Terrorism Department also urged residents to seek shelter when air-raid sirens are heard. The attacks forced schools and universities across the Kurdistan Region to suspend in-person classes for extended periods, prompting a shift to online learning.

Following several days of strikes on the Kurdistan Region, Kurdish leaders, including Masoud Barzani and Bafel Talabani, warned the federal Iraqi government to take "serious" steps to stop the assaults by Shi'ite militias operating in the Iraqi borderlands, stating that "restraint also has its limits."

=== Iraqi government ===
In late April, the Iraqi government expressed its intention to acquire anti-drone systems, but stated that none would be provided to the Kurdistan Region. Analysts described the decision as "add[ing] insult to injury," noting that the Kurdistan Region had been among the areas hardest hit by the attacks, while lacking its own air defense capabilities and not being allowed to independently procure such systems.

Following the 17 August attacks on Masrour Barzani's office in Pirmam, Iraqi Prime Minister Ali al-Zaidi ordered an investigation into the attacks, stating that its findings would be made public "at the earliest opportunity" to identify the perpetrators. The KRG had already attributed the attacks to Iran shortly after they occurred.

=== US military response ===
The United States responded to the attacks by targeting Iran-aligned groups, including several factions part of the PMF. Sites targeted included PMF positions in Mosul, the Nineveh Plains, Kirkuk, and Al Anbar Governorate. Some of the strikes were described as "intense" and resulted in the deaths of at least 30 PMF fighters, while several others were wounded. Some of those killed in Kirkuk were reportedly members of the Turkmen Brigades within the PMF. On 18 March, the leader of the Iran-aligned Badr Organisation, Hadi al-Amiri, stated that recent airstrikes on the PMF had killed more than 60 fighters and wounded over 100, describing the attacks as a significant escalation.

=== US-led coalition withdrawal ===
On 31 July, Al-Monitor reported that the United States had withdrawn its MIM-104 Patriot air defense batteries from the Kurdistan Region. The following day, after being questioned by media outlets, the Pentagon neither confirmed the withdrawal nor provided a reason, citing "operational security" concerns. Later that day, Rudaw reported a surprise "72-hour pull-out" of nearly all US-led coalition personnel and military assets (including those of the United Kingdom, France, and Germany) from their main headquarters at Erbil International Airport. Although the coalition's withdrawal from Iraq had already been scheduled to conclude by 30 September, the KRG had not been informed in advance of the move. According to Rudaw, the KRG initially mistook the increased military traffic for the arrival of additional interceptor missiles, only later realizing that coalition forces were carrying out a withdrawal, which left the regional authorities unsettled.

On 17 August, a US surveillance balloon over Erbil that had been brought down on 1 August, fueling rumors of a withdrawal, was reportedly redeployed, according to Rudaw. This indicated that the infrastructure and personnel required to operate the balloon remained present at Erbil International Airport.

=== Diplomatic reactions ===
==== States ====
United Arab Emirates (UAE): The UAE condemned the attack on a Peshmerga base on 24 March, describing it as a "terrorist attack against the Kurds." Later in July, the UAE strongly condemned Iran's continued strikes on the Kurdistan Region and reiterated its support for the region.

United Kingdom (UK): UK Foreign Secretary Yvette Cooper condemned the drone strikes, expressed condolences to the victims, and reaffirmed the United Kingdom's support for peace, stability, and continued cooperation with the Kurdistan Region. Following the targeting of Masrour Barzani's residence on 17 August, the British Consulate General in Erbil said in a statement posted on X that the UK "strongly condemns" the attacks.

United States: According to Axios, U.S. President Donald Trump spoke with leaders of the Kurdistan Region's two main parties, Masoud Barzani and Bafel Talabani, a day after the bombing campaign began, discussing what were described as "sensitive" topics. On 1 April 2026, Kurdistan Region President Nechirvan Barzani received a message from U.S. President Donald Trump, conveyed by U.S. envoy Tom Barrack. Trump condemned the attacks on the Kurdistan Region, including a drone strike on Barzani's residence in Duhok, and expressed condolences for Peshmerga soldiers killed in an Iranian missile strike on 24 March, wishing the injured a speedy recovery.

France: On 28 March, French President Emmanuel Macron expressed condolences to Kurdistan Region President Nechirvan Barzani and the families of six Peshmerga killed in an Iranian missile strike in Soran on 24 March, and wished a speedy recovery to the wounded.

Germany: On 2 April, Nechirvan Barzani held a phone call with Geza Andreas von Geyr, State Secretary of the German Federal Foreign Office, regarding the recent attacks on the Kurdistan Region, during which von Geyr reaffirmed Germany's support.

Jordan: King Abdullah II of Jordan sent a letter expressing condolences to the Kurdistan Region President and to the families of the victims of the 24 March drone attack on a Peshmerga base in Soran.

Qatar: Qatari Prime Minister and Foreign Minister Mohammed bin Abdulrahman Al Thani condemned the attacks on the Kurdistan Region carried out since 28 February.

Saudi Arabia: The Saudi Ministry of Foreign Affairs strongly condemned the attacks targeting the residences of Kurdistan Region President Nechirvan Barzani and KDP Leader Masoud Barzani, as well as all attacks against the Kurdistan Region.

==== Non-state actors ====
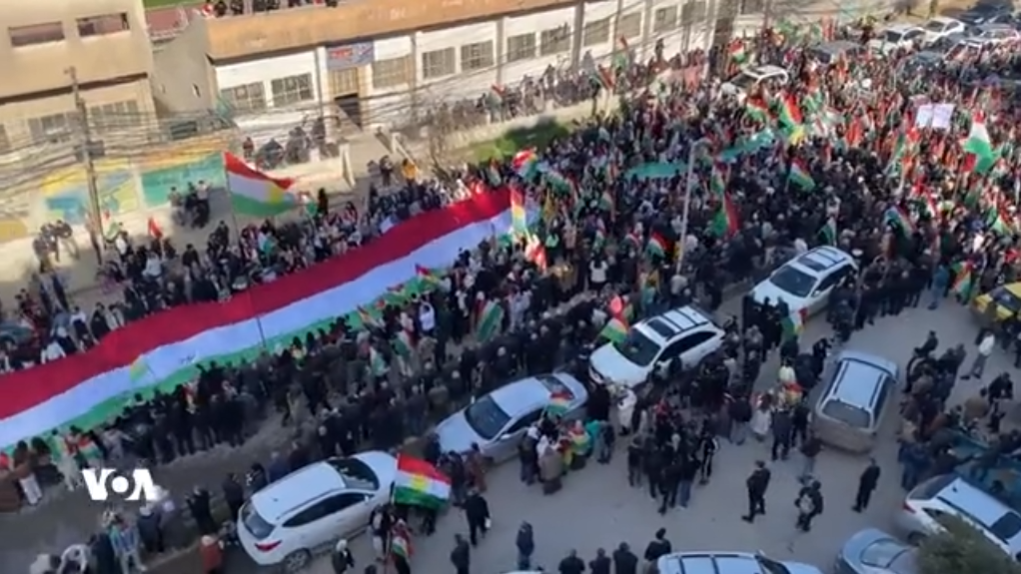
In March 2026, protests were held in Qamishlo, Rojava, Syria against Iranian attacks on the Kurdistan Region.

Arab League: Arab League Secretary-General Ahmed Aboul Gheit condemned the drone strikes in a phone call with Kurdistan Region Prime Minister Nechirvan Barzani.

Azem Alliance: The Sunni political group issued a statement condemning the attack on Nechirvan Barzani's residence.

Christian Alliance: The alliance condemned the attack on Masrour Barzani's office on 17 August "in the strongest possible terms."

DEM Party: Co-chair Tuncer Bakırhan strongly condemned the 17 August attacks targeting Masrour Barzani's office and the residence of the director of Parastin during a phone call with Barzani. Similarly, prominent Kurdish politician Leyla Zana strongly condemned the attacks in a message.

European Union: EU Ambassador to Iraq Klemens Semtner said that the European Union and its member states "strongly condemned" the 17 August attacks targeting Masrour Barzani's office and the residence of the director of Parastin, adding that they were relieved that no casualties had been reported.

Kurdistan Communities Union (KCK): The organization strongly condemned the attacks in a written statement.

Kurdistan Diaspora Confederation: The organization strongly condemned the targeting of Masoud Barzani's office on 17 August, describing it as "terrifiying" and "a deliberate act that crosses every accepted boundary of international conduct."

Kurdistan Justice Group (Komell): Komell, which is represented in the Kurdistan Parliament, condemned the 17 August attack on Masrour Barzani's office and reiterated calls for Kurdish neutrality in the Iran war.

Kurdish National Council (ENKS): The ENKS General Secretariat condemned the attacks as a "blatant and brutal assault" which are part of broader efforts to "destabilize the Kurdistan Region" and undermine its sovereignty.

National Wisdom Movement: Iraqi Shi'ite political leader Ammar al-Hakim condemned the attacks and called for "stronger measures to protect stability."

Rojava: Demonstrations erupted across Rojava, specifically in Kobane, Qamishlo, and Girke Lege, in support of the Kurdistan Region following the Iranian strikes.

Supreme Yazidi Spiritual Council: Mir Hazem Tahsin Beg, head of the Supreme Yazidi Spiritual Council, "strongly condemned" the 17 August attacks targeting Masrour Barzani's office and the residence of the director of Parastin.

Syrian Democratic Forces (SDF): SDF commander Mazloum Abdi condemned the 17 August attack on Masrour Barzani's office, calling it "an assault on the will of the Kurdish people."

Syria's Tomorrow Movement: Its leader, Ahmad al-Jarba, condemned the 17 August attacks targeting Masrour Barzani's office, and described the incident as part of what he called "a systematic Iranian effort to destabilize the Kurdistan Region."

Turkmen Development Party: The party, which is represented in the Kurdistan Parliament, condemned the 17 August attacks targeting Masrour Barzani's office. Its leader, Mohammed Ilkhani, warned that such attacks posed a serious threat to the people, stability, and political standing of the region.

== See also ==
- List of country-specific articles on the 2026 Iran war
- 2026 Iranian strikes on Iraq
- 2026 Kurdish–Iranian crisis
