= 2026 United States-led conflict with pro-Iranian Iraqi militias =

- Part of the 2026 Iran war and the Middle Eastern crisis
Date	28 February 2026 – present (8 months, 2 weeks and 5 days)
Location	Iraq and Syria (occasional spillovers)
Status	Ongoing: Iran-backed militias strike US bases in Iraq in response to the US attacks on Iran; Air raids on pro-Iranian militias targets in Iraq

Belligerents
United States; Israel; Saudi Arabia (Note: Reuters reported that the Saudi Air Force struck Iranian-backed Iraqi militias near the Iraq–Saudi Arabia border around the time of the 7 April ceasefire.); Kuwait (Note: According to The Wall Street Journal, Kuwait launched attacks on Iranian-backed Iraqi militias from its own territory. Iraqi officials reported that there were at least two rocket attacks from Kuwaiti territory, though Reuters could not confirm whether it was the Kuwaiti Armed Forces or the U.S. military that were responsible.); Ukraine (claimed by Iraq, denied by Ukraine) CPFIK (Note: See 2026 Iranian strikes on the Kurdistan Region and 2026 Kurdish–Iranian crisis)	Iran; Popular Mobilization Forces; Islamic Resistance in Iraq; Houthis	Self-defense only: Iraq; Kurdistan Region; Syria

Commanders and leaders
(United States) Donald Trump (United States) Pete Hegseth (Israel) Benjamin Netanyahu (Israel) Omer Tischler (Israel) Tomer Bar (Saudi Arabia) Salman (Kuwait) Mishal Al-Ahmad Al-Jaber Al-Sabah (Ukraine) Volodymyr Zelenskyy (alleged)	(Iran) Mohammad-Reza Gharaei Ashtiani (Iran) Esmail Qaani; Falih Al-Fayyadh; Qais Khazali; Akram al-Kaabi; Ali Hassan al-Furaiji †; Abu Ali al-Askari †; Saad Daway al-Baiji †; Abu Taha al-Turkmani †; Yasin Muhammad Sadiq † (Houthis) Mohammed Khalid al-Ayyashi †	(Iraq) Ali al-Zaidi (Iraq) Mohammed Shia' al-Sudani (Kurdistan Region) Nechirvan Barzani (Iraq) Saad Dawai † Ahmed al-Sharaa

Units involved
United States Armed Forces; United States Army; United States Air Force; Israel Defense Forces; Israeli Air Force; Saudi Arabian Armed Forces; Royal Saudi Air Force; Kuwait Armed Forces; Kuwait Air Force; Ministry of Defence (Ukraine); Main Directorate of Intelligence (Ukraine) (alleged)	Islamic Revolutionary Guard Corps; Popular Mobilization Forces; Kata'ib al-Imam Ali; Turkmen Brigades; Islamic Resistance in Iraq; Kata'ib Hezbollah; Asa'ib Ahl al-Haq; Kata'ib Sayyid al-Shuhada; Harakat Hezbollah al-Nujaba; Badr Organization; Ashab al-Kahf; Houthis	Iraq Armed Forces; Iraqi Ground Forces; Iraqi Police; (Kurdistan Region) Peshmerga; Syrian Armed Forces; Syrian Army

Casualties and losses
United States: 1 MQ-9 drone shotdown	Popular Mobilization Forces: per Badr Organization (as of March 19th): 60 fighters killed, 100 wounded; per other PMF sources (as of April 10th): 80 fighters killed, 270 wounded; Islamic Revolutionary Guard Corps: 4 operatives killed Houthis: One advisor killed	(Iraq) 10 Iraqi soldiers (killed in USAF airstrikes); 3 Iraqi policemen (two killed in USAF airstrikes and one killed in a PMF attributed drone attack)

Following the outbreak of the 2026 Iran war on 28 February 2026, the United States and Israel conducted airstrikes targeting several Iranian-backed Iraqi Shia militias under the Islamic Resistance in Iraq (IRI) and Popular Mobilization Forces (PMF) umbrellas in Iraq. At least several dozen Iraqi militiamen have been reported dead so far from attacks on militia headquarters, checkpoints, ammunition dumps, and private residences of senior commanders. PMF and IRI militias retaliated by lobbying rockets and drones at U.S. and Kurdish bases. According to reporting from Reuters and the Wall Street Journal, Saudi Arabia and Kuwait had also conducted airstrikes on Iranian-backed militias in Iraq.

On 7 April, the Iraqi government reported that the U.S. conducted 138 attacks in Iraq, resulting in the deaths of 73 PMF members, ten Iraqi army soldiers, three Iraqi Federal Police officers, and six civilians. Among those killed by the airstrikes was General Saad Dawai, the commander of the Iraqi Armed Forces' Anbar Operations Command.

== Background ==
The U.S. has called for the disarmament of Iran-backed militias in Iraq and designated some of them to be terrorist organisations. Several of these are part of the mostly Shia Muslim Popular Mobilization Forces (PMF), funded by the government of Iraq. The PMF were established in 2014 after the Islamic State invasion of Iraq routed the regular Iraqi army and had an important role in regaining territory alongside the U.S. campaign. After the defeat of the ISIS in 2017, Iraq did not demobilize the PMF, which have grown to a size of 238,000 members and US$3.6 billion in funding. PMF militias launched strikes at U.S. forces in Iraq after the October 7 attacks by Hamas against Israel in 2023, but these declined from 2024 until the outbreak of the 2026 Iran war.

Iran accused the U.S. of interfering in the November 2025 Iraqi parliamentary election. Iraqi foreign minister Fuad Hussein claimed that the US put six Iran-backed militias on a "prohibited" list and to be excluded from the next government. The Shia Muslim-dominated Coordination Framework, a coalition of parties partially supported by Iran but opposed to the prominent Shia cleric Muqtada al-Sadr, won the largest number of seats and thus gained the right to nominate the prime minister. The U.S. criticized its decision to nominate Nouri al-Maliki, who is perceived as being close to Iran and its allies in Iraq.

== Timeline ==
Plains clothed PMF militiamen and their civilian supporters gathered on March 1st near American Embassies in Baghdad to protest the assassination of Iranian Supreme Leader Ali Khamenei. Clashes were reported between pro PMF protesters and Iraqi security forces.

On March 3rd, an unidentified airstrike striking a PMF base in Kirkuk killed 6 fighters. Rumors of an American fighter plane shot down by anti aircraft fire over Basra also emerged on Iraqi social media through PMF channels, which reportedly led to Iraqi Police searching for the allegedly downed pilot. However, such claims were denied by United States Central Command through their official Twitter account, and any evidence for the purported incident has yet to surface.

A senior Kata'ib Hezbollah commander identified as Abu Hassan Al-Fariji was among the fatalities killed by air strikes conducted on March 4th. On March 11th, an airstrike targeting a PMF building killed 20 militiamen and civilians in Akashat.

The United States responded to Iranian missile attacks in Iraqi Kurdistan by targeting Iran-aligned groups, including several factions part of the PMF. Sites targeted included PMF positions in Mosul, the Nineveh Plains, Kirkuk, and Al Anbar Governorate. Some of the strikes were described as "intense" and resulted in the deaths of at least 30 PMF fighters, while several others were wounded. Some of those killed in Kirkuk were reportedly members of the Turkmen Brigades within the PMF.

A MQ-9 Reaper drone operated by the United States Air Force was shot down by PMF fighters over Basra on March 9th.

On March 14th, an unidentified drone struck a helipad in the Embassy of the United States, Baghdad. In return, American airstrikes targeted several Kata'ib Hezbollah linked sites and killed an unnamed senior leader described by PMF sources as a "key figure" and at least another fighter.

Other airstrikes killed Rahif Ali Qasim, a Badr Organization commander from Lebanon and overseer of PMF missile systems, in his residence. Unofficial sources reportedly close to the PMF also allegedly announced the slaying of Kata'ib Hezbollah secretary general Abu Hussein al-Muhammadawi.

An airstrike on March 16 killed four PMF fighters manning a checkpoint near Al-Qa'im, Al Anbar Governorate. PMF officials attributed the attack to the United States Air Forces. Kata'ib Hezbollah also reported the killing of its spokesperson and security officer, Abu Ali al-Askari, from airstrikes targeting PMF headquarters. An unidentified drone believed to have been launched by pro Iranian militias struck the Royal Tulip Al Rasheed Hotel in Baghdad. Although Iraqi officials claimed that the Al-Rasheed Hotel sustained damage, they denied that any casualties were suffered from the attack.

Airstrikes on March 18 targeting a command headquarters in Kirkuk killed at least three PMF fighters belonging to the 45th Brigade. Kata'ib Hezbollah officials proposed five conditions, including the cessation of Israeli Defense Force (IDF) operations against Hezbollah in Lebanon, the halting of American air strikes against residential areas in Iraq, and the removal of CIA operatives from Iraq beyond Kurdistan Region areas in exchange for halting attacks against embassies. Only hours after Kata'ib Hezbollah's announcement of a ceasefire proposal, American airstrikes struck many PMF positions in Nineveh and killed at least two fighters. Four more PMF fighters affiliated with Asaib Ahl al-Haq were reportedly seriously wounded from those attacks. Other PMF factions, most notably Kata'ib Sayyid ul-Shuhada, announced a commitment in pursuing further hostilities against the United States and Israel.

According to local Assyrian sources, the Iraqi Army’s 16th Division was deployed to take over positions held by the PMF's 30th Brigade in the Nineveh Plains to diffuse tensions with the United States.

Iraqi Prime Minister Mohammed Shia' al-Sudani met with PMF leaders in their headquarters on March 19th, and reaffirmed support for the paramilitary coalition as a “fundamental component of [Iraq's] national security system.” He also condemned foreign airstrikes on PMF positions as a "violation of Iraq's sovereignty." On March 24th, the Ministerial Council for National Security officially granted PMF factions permission to retaliate against airstrikes against them.

A base in Baghdad operated by Harakat al-Nujaba was also reportedly targeted by an airstrike, though PMF sources asserted that the attack only caused "material damage." Airstrikes conducted in the Saladin Governorate struck positions held by the PMF's 6th Brigade. Iraqi officials at the scene reportedly declined to give any causality figures and closed off the affected areas.

IRI aligned militias claimed responsibility for 27 attacks against American bases in a 24-hour period on March 21st. A drone attack loosely attributed to the PMF struck an Iraqi government operated National Intelligence Service headquarters and killed a police officer.

PMF sources claim that American and Israeli warplanes struck positions held by the PMF's 15th Brigade in Anbar and North Tigris on March 23rd. Although the PMF admitted to significant damage to their headquarters and logistical assets, it initially reported that no human casualties were suffered from the attacks. Later reports emerged that at least 14 PMF fighters and a senior commander were killed by the airstrikes in Anbar.

Airstrikes targeting a joint Iraqi army and PMF base in Anbar on March 24th killed at least seven Iraqi soldiers and wounded thirteen more survivors. Iraqi officials alleged that the base's healthcare facility was specifically targeted. Among those killed were General Saad Dawai, the commander of the Iraqi Armed Forces' Anbar Operations Command, and his chief of staff.

Between March 23rd and March 25th, PMF factions announced that they were expanding their attacks to American bases in Syria. However, US forces withdrew from many of the targeted bases mid January due to the 2026 northeastern Syria offensive, and handed them over to the Syrian Transitional Government. Iraqi authorities later announced the arrest of at least four suspects allegedly responsible for the attacks on Syrian bases.

Other airstrikes conducted in March 26th targeted an Anbar base occupied by the PMF's 13th Brigade, and wounded at least three fighters. Another wave of airstrikes in Kirkuk on that same day struck tribal fighters linked to the PMF's 61th Brigade.

On March 27th, the Syrian Army reported that their units shot down an unidentified drone attempting to attack the Al-Tanf base. Syrian sources asserted that the drone was launched from Iraq.

A day later, airstrikes targeting PMF positions near the Kirkuk International Airport killed at least three fighters and two Iraqi policemen.

American journalist Shelly Kittleson was kidnapped by gunmen linked to Kata'ib Hezbollah in Baghdad on March 31st. Iraqi officials reported that security forces captured one of the suspected kidnappers, though the other reported perpetrators remain at large. On April 7th, Kata'ib Hezbollah announced Kittleson's release on the condition of her departure from Iraq.

In early April, Iranian media outlets reported the mass mobilization of PMF factions on the Iraqi-Iranian border. Some of the reports claimed that PMF convoys crossed into Iran and were allegedly deployed to reinforce Basij positions against American and Israeli attacks. American airstrikes also allegedly targeted PMF convoys crossing into Iran, which reportedly led Iraqi officials to close border crossings into Iran.

A series of airstrikes in Western Nineveh killed Yasin Muhammad Sadiq, who was a commander of the PMF's 53rd Brigade, on April 1st. PMF sources also reported another fighter was killed while accompanying Sadiq and four more were wounded.

On April 4th, airstrikes targeting PMF positions near the Syrian-Iraqi border killed at least one Kata'ib Hezebollah fighter. PMF sources also reported four more fighters were also wounded by the attack. Other airstrikes targeted PMF bases near Baghdad and Mosul.

On April 5th, at least five airstrikes struck PMF bases and other positions in Saladin province. Other airstrikes targeted a PMF base affiliated with Kata’ib al-Imam Ali in Kirkuk.

An engineering site operated by the PMF inside Camp Ashraf was attacked by warplanes on April 7th. Due to the loss of communications in areas surrounding Camp Ashraf, the number of casualties and damages caused by the bombings currently remain unknown. Airstrikes in Basra targeting farms privately owned by Kata'ib Hezbollah leadership killed a senior commander and two other individuals.

In accordance with the Iranian-American ceasefire declared on April 7th, PMF and IRI aligned factions announced a halting of their military operations. Despite the official ceasefire declaration, a team of American diplomats were reportedly ambushed by PMF gunmen in Baghdad a day later. In response to the attack, the United States Deputy Secretary of State Christopher Landau summoned Iraqi ambassadors.

On April 10th, PMF factions sponsored a 40th day anniversary for Khamenei's assassination. During a ceremony in the Dhi Qar Governorate, Badr Organization Secretary-General Hadi Al-Amiri and his entourage were accosted and interrupted by hostile tribesmen while he was trying to give a speech. Badr Organization militiamen and tribal fighters engaged in a gun battle, which forced Al-Amiri to flee for his safety. Casualties from the clashes currently remain unknown.

Reports emerged on May 10th that Israel covertly constructed an outpost in a remote desert area of Western Iraq during the height of the 2026 Iran War. According to sources allegedly close to Israeli officials, the IDF established the outpost as a hub to support aerial sorties against Iran and rescue any downed Israeli Air Force (IAF) pilots. IAF planes reportedly bombed Iraqi army units that discovered the outpost. In response to the reports, PMF factions announced on May 12th they were sweeping Najaf and Karbala deserts for any IDF bases.

On May 15th, an Iraqi national, Mohammad Baqer Saad Dawood al-Saadi, was arrested in Turkey for alleged Kata'ib Hezbollah ties. According to the United States Justice Department, al-Saadi was an operative of a Kata'ib Hezbollah and Quds Force cell involved in plotting terrorist attacks against Jewish sites in North America and Europe. A federal court in the United States indicted al-Saadi for alleged plots against a Jewish synagogue in New York City. al-Saadi is also accused by American and European authorities of stabbing a pair of Jewish men in London, setting a North Macedonian synagogue on fire, bombing a Bank of New York in Amsterdam, and attempting to bomb a Bank of America in Paris.

On May 28th, a car bomb killed Uday Muhsin al-Halfi, a PMF commander and senior leader of Harakat Ansar Allah al-Awfiya, in southern Maysan. PMF sources reported that the bomb was planted inside al-Halfi's personal vehicle, and its detonation wounded another fighter described as al-Halfi's brother accompanying him. Although the perpetrators have yet to be identified, the PMF blamed the attack on Israel and the United States.

On June 25th, a PMF operated ammunition dump exploded under unknown circumstances in eastern Diyala. Local emergency services were able to contain and extinguish the fires. According to PMF and Iraqi officials, no casualties were caused by the explosion. The incident is currently pending investigation.

The Supreme Judicial Council of Iraq (SJC) enacted anti Terrorism Laws that forbade the unauthorized use of combat drones on July 24th. Shortly after the SJC's ruling, Iraqi National Intelligence Service (INIS) units carried out raids against PMF operated drone factories near Baghdad. INIS agents arrested three suspected PMF fighters and sized 25 drone frames, carbon-fiber panels, manufactured components, assembly equipment, and other production materials.

PMF militias fired missiles and launched drones against oil fields in Saudi Arabia on July 27th. The attacks were conducted in conjunction with Houthi strikes against Saudi oil infrastructure. Saudi sources reported that all missiles and drones from Iraq were intercepted.

On that same day, Iraqi officials announced the dismantling of alleged Ukrainian sabotage cells. According to Iraqi sources, the Ukrainian linked cells were conducting attacks against Iraqi and Iranian infrastructure. Ukraine's foreign ministry denied any involvement in the alleged sabotage cells, and denounced Iraqi claims as "baseless."

In retribution for the July 27th attacks against Saudi oil fields, American and Saudi warplanes bombed several PMF sites on July 29th. PMF officials announced that the airstrikes killed 20 fighters and wounded 32 survivors. According to Iranian media, four Islamic Revolutionary Guard Corps operatives were also slain by the American and Saudi airstrikes. Later reports emerged that that a Houthi advisor, identified as Mohammed Khalid al-Ayyashi, was additionally targeted and assassinated by American and Saudi forces during those attacks.

Jordan and Syrian officials also reported attacks and threats from pro-Iranian armed groups stationed in Iraq. Both Jordan and Syria warned of potential military interventions in Iraq if the Iraqi government fail to curtail the alleged PMF attacks against their territories.

PMF factions reportedly evacuated many of their bases in Nineveh on August 2nd due to fears of further American-led airstrikes. Local media outlets claimed that only a small handful of PMF fighters were left to man the bases in hopes of limiting casualties.

Iraqi counterterrorism forces arrested Abbas Hussein al-Yaqoubi, a PMF intelligence officer and senior Harakat al-Nujaba commander, over charges relating to alleged attacks against American interests on August 18th. Foreign analysts noted that al-Yaqoubi's arrest appeared to be part of an Iraqi government pressure campaign to disarm PMF militias. However, all criminal charges against al-Yaqoubi were dropped by the Karkh Criminal Court a day later allegedly over fears of an escalation with Harakat al-Nujaba.

On September 12, a drone attack on Saudi Arabia's East-West oil pipeline caused extensive damage and led to its closure. Saudi authorities credited PMF militias as the perpetrators, and Iraqi officials responded by seizing a drone launching platform from a PMF faction.

Starting in October 2026, tensions arose between the Iraqi government and Kataib Hezbollah along with Harakat al-Nujaba due to both groups refusing to disarm during negotiations for state control of Jurf al-Sakhar, a hub for oil smuggling which Kataib Hezbollah administers. Due to the dispute, Iraqi Prime minister Ali al-Zaidi dismissed nine PMF affiliated officials from Jurf al-Sakhar. Iraqi security forces entered Jurf al-Sakhar on November 16 after a deadline was set for Kataib Hezbollah to withdraw.
