= Public holidays in Iraq =

This is a list of public holidays in Iraq.

Date	Name	Notes
January 1	New Year's Day	
January 6	Army Day	
March 21	Nowruz	Persian New Year (celebrated mostly by Kurds in Iraq)
May 1	Labour Day	
October 3	National Day	National Iraqi Day. Celebrates the independence of Iraq from the United Kingdom in 1932
December 10	Victory Day	Victory over Daesh ISIS
December 25	Christmas Day	
Muharram 1	Islamic New Year	
Muharram 10	Ashura	
Rabi' al-Awwal 12	The Prophet's Birthday	
Shawwal 1	End of Ramadan (3 days)	
Dhu al-Hijjah 10	Feast of Sacrifice (4 days)	
Dhu al-Hijjah 18	Eid al-Ghadir	

== Special holidays ==
Iraq recognizes official religious holidays that apply exclusively to followers of those religions, these holidays include:

=== Christianity ===
- 25 December: Nativity of Jesus
- Easter (2 days)

=== Judaism ===
- 15 Nisan: Pesach (2 days)
- 15 Tishrei: Sukkot (2 days)

=== Sabianism ===
- 5-6 April: Eid al-Banja
- 7-8 August: Eid al-Kabeer
- 23 November: Eid al-Sagheer
- Eid Wahna Lamafa

=== Yazidism ===
- First Wednesday of April
- 18-21 July
- 23-30 September
- First Friday of December

== Other important dates ==
These are working days at the KRG Council of Ministers, and businesses are open. Special events take place around the Iraqi Kurdistan Region to mark these dates.

- 10 February: Kurdish Authors Union Day
- 18 February: Kurdish Students Union Day
- 1 March: Commemoration of Mustafa Barzani’s Death
- 7 March: Liberation of Slemani City
- 8 March: Women's Day
- 10 March: Kurdish Clothes Day (Iraqi Kurdistan only)
- 13 March: Liberation of Duhok City
- 16 March: Halabja Remembrance Day
- 20 March: Liberation of Kirkuk City
- 1 April: Assyrian New Year
- 9 April: Baghdad Liberation Day
- 14 April: Commemoration of Anfal genocide against the Kurds
- 16 April: Remembrance of Chemical Attack on Balisan and Sheikh Wasan
- 25 April: Anniversary of First Cabinet of Kurdish Government (1993)
- 13 June: Sulaymaniyah City Fallen and Martyrs' Day
- 14 July: Anniversary of the 1958 Revolution
- 11 December: Establishment of Kurdish Women’s Union
- 17 December Kurdistan Flag Day
