= Iraq in the 2026 Iran war =

- Part of the 2026 Iran war, Iraq conflict
Date	28 February – present
Location	Iraq
Status	Ongoing

Belligerents
Iran; Islamic Revolutionary Guard Corps; Quds Force; Popular Mobilization Forces; IRI	Iraq; Kurdistan Region United States; Kuwait; Saudi Arabia; Israel

The 2026 Iran war has involved Iraq, where Iranian forces and allied militias based in the country have conducted missile and drone strikes against facilities primarily of the United States, mostly in the Kurdistan Region and Baghdad.

== Background ==
Following the 2020 killing of Iranian General Qasem Soleimani, Iran struck U.S. bases in Iraq, including Al-Asad Airbase and Erbil, causing injuries. Later on, Iran‑aligned militias carried out periodic attacks on U.S. and coalition facilities during the Gaza war.

== Incidents ==
=== Kurdistan Region ===
In northern Iraq's autonomous Kurdistan Region, Iranian forces and Iran‑aligned militias have launched hundreds of ballistic missiles and drones since late February 2026. The strikes, carried out under the pretext of targeting U.S. interests, including military, diplomatic, and educational facilities, as well as Iranian Kurdish opposition groups, have primarily targeted such sites in Erbil, but have increasingly also struck civilian infrastructure, including hotels, telecommunications facilities, and residential areas.

=== Baghdad ===
On 10 March 2026, a drone attack targeted the Baghdad Diplomatic Support Center, a logistics hub for U.S. diplomats near Baghdad International Airport. According to U.S. officials, six drones were launched toward the facility, five of which were intercepted while one impacted near a guard tower; no casualties were reported. U.S. officials said the drone involved in the attack was believed to have been launched by Iran-backed militias operating in Iraq.

On 11 March, Saraya Awliya al-Dam, a pro-Iran Iraqi militia and part of the Islamic Resistance in Iraq (IRI), claimed responsibility for four "special operations" targeting U.S. bases inside and outside Iraq over the previous 24 hours.

On 14 March, a missile struck a helipad at the United States embassy complex in Baghdad's heavily fortified Green Zone, causing smoke to rise above the compound. A day later, Iraq's Justice Ministry warned that strikes near Baghdad International Airport threatened the security of al-Karkh Central Prison, which housed thousands of ISIS detainees recently transferred from Syria.

Footage circulating online also purported to show Iranian-aligned militias, Kata'ib Hezbollah, carrying out drone strikes against Victory Base area close to Baghdad International Airport during the same period. The five missiles which struck the airport caused injuries to four people, among them airport staff and security personnel.

On 16 March, multiple explosions rocked Baghdad's Jadriyah district, killing at least four people in an air raid on a house used by an Iran-backed group. On 17 March, a video showed what appeared to be a drone attack on the Al Rasheed Hotel in the Green Zone in Baghdad. On the same day, the Saraya Awliya al-Dam group released a footage of an fiber optic drone performing reconnaissance above the US embassy compound. On 18 March, a drone hit the US embassy in Baghdad.

On 19 March, Kata'ib Hezbollah said it would pause attacks on the U.S. Embassy in Baghdad for five days under the condition that Israel's "displacement of civilians and bombardment" in Beirut as part of the 2026 Lebanon war came to an end. On 20 March, a drone attack targeted a US diplomatic site near Baghdad International Airport. On 21 March, one police officer was killed in a drone strike on the headquarters of the Iraqi National Intelligence Service in Mansour district, Baghdad. On 22 March, several rockets and drones were aimed at a US diplomatic and logistics center at Baghdad International Airport.

On 21 March, the Ashab al-Kahf militia set the Victory Base ablaze with a drone. On 25 March, the IRI militia struck an American radar and helicopter with a fiber optic drone.

On 30 March, rockets hit Martyr Mohammed Alaa air base in Baghdad. An airplane was destroyed, but no injuries were reported.

On 8 April, Iraqi armed groups with backing from Iran carried out drone attacks on a US diplomatic site.

=== Other regions ===
On 10 March, an airstrike killed four fighters affiliated with Iran‑linked Kata'ib al-Imam Ali in northern Iraq's Dibis District, near Kirkuk.

On 12 March, two Air Force Boeing KC-135 Stratotankers collided mid-air over western Iraq killing all six crew. Pro-Iranian groups, including the Islamic Resistance in Iraq, claimed responsibility for downing the tanker, though U.S. officials denied these claims. In the Akashat area of the Al-Qa'im District near the Iraq–Syria border, strikes hit three sites belonging to the Popular Mobilization Forces' 19th Brigade, Harakat Ansar Allah al-Awfiya, killing at least 35 fighters and wounding around 90 others.

On 16 March, reports confirmed that Abu Ali al-Askari, a senior commander of Kata'ib Hezbollah, had been killed. On 19 March, airstrikes targeted positions of the Popular Mobilization Forces in northern Iraq, including in Nineveh and Salah al-Din governorates, killing at least two fighters. The strikes were reportedly carried out by U.S. Apache attack helicopters as part of ongoing operations against Iran‑aligned militia groups to suppress threats to U.S. forces and interests, according to the Chairman of the Joint Chiefs of Staff, Dan Caine.

Around the same time, drones struck the radar system at the Umm Qasr naval base in Basra Governorate, causing minor damage but no reported casualties. On 20 March, a strike in Tuz Khurmatu, northern Iraq, killed one PMF fighter and wounded another. A day later, the Islamic Resistance in Iraq claimed responsibility for targeting 27 U.S. military bases in Iraq and across the region over the past 24 hours.

On 23 March, 15 fighters from Iraq's Popular Mobilization Forces (PMF), including a commander, were killed in an U.S. airstrike on their base in Habbaniyah, Al Anbar Governorate. Two days later, seven fighters were killed and 13 others were injured in a strike on a military healthcare clinic in the Habbaniyah base. On 26 March, Iraqi forces shot down a low-flying drone in Kirkuk without causing casualties. On 28 March, airstrikes targeted a PMF headquarters near Kirkuk International Airport, killing at least three fighters and wounding four others.

On 31 March, a drone crashed in West Qurna 1 without exploding. Also that day, two PMF fighters were killed and four others were wounded in strikes on their base in the Ar-Rutba District of Al Anbar Governorate. On 1 April, shelling on a PMF headquarters of the Al-Hussein Brigade in the Tel Afar District in Nineveh governorate killed a commander and three fighters affiliated with Iran-linked armed groups.

On 4 April, a drone stuck oil facilities near Basra, causing a fire. On 7 April, at least three people were killed and five others wounded after rockets launched from Kuwait struck a house near Basra in southern Iraq. The attack prompted protests in Basra, during which demonstrators stormed and vandalised the Kuwaiti consulate.

On 18 May, the New York Times reported that the Israeli military operated two "covert" outposts in Iraq's western desert and killed a shepherd and a soldier in a bid to hide one of the sites near the town of al-Nukhaib.

=== Joint U.S.–Saudi strikes ===
On 29 July 2026, the United States and Saudi Arabia conducted coordinated airstrikes against bases and headquarters of the Popular Mobilization Forces (PMF) in Iraq, stating that the operation was a response to more than 30 drone attacks over the previous 72 hours targeting Saudi oil infrastructure in the kingdom's Eastern Province and U.S. forces. The strikes targeted PMF headquarters and military installations in Baghdad, Wasit, Nineveh, Basra, Kirkuk, Karbala and Diyala, including Al-Fath al-Mubin Camp in Wasit, the Bartella area in Nineveh, Al-Muhammadawi Camp in Diyala, and logistics facilities in Al-Deir near Basra. The PMF said at least 20 of its members were killed and 32 others wounded, while Iraqi authorities reported injuries among PMF personnel and condemned the strikes as a violation of Iraq's sovereignty. Later that day, Iranian state media reported that four members of the Islamic Revolutionary Guard Corps (IRGC) were killed in the U.S.–Saudi airstrikes on Diyala Governorate.

== Casualties ==
Total casualties in Iraq included more than 146 killed and 525 injured.

More than 101 members of the pro-Iranian Popular Mobilization Forces (PMF), including 30 fighters of the Islamic Resistance in Iraq (IRI), had been killed in US and Israeli airstrikes. By 10 April 2026, 270 PMF members were also injured, although the number of injured IRI fighters was updated to 320 by the end of June. Another 32 PMF members were injured in a new round of US strikes in July. The IRI is composed of PMF members who have engaged in direct attacks on US military forces in Iraq. US airstrikes on PMF positions also killed seven Iraqi soldiers and two policemen, while 19 soldiers were injured.

In addition, in Iraq's northern Kurdish region, 32 people were killed and around 154 injured from attacks by both Iran and pro-Iranian Iraqi groups. The dead included 27 Peshmerga soldiers (belonging to either the KRG or the militias of the CPFIK), two civilians, one Asayish security forces member, one French soldier and one unknown individual. The injured also included six or seven French soldiers.

Three more civilians were killed in a rocket attack in southern Iraq that reportedly originated from Kuwait. Elsewhere, an Iraqi policeman was killed in a drone strike in Baghdad on the headquarters of the Iraqi National Intelligence Service.

== Reactions and impact ==
Clashes in Baghdad between Iran‑aligned militia supporters and Iraqi security forces, including protests near the Green Zone in early March following the assassination of Ali Khamenei, caused injuries and heightened security around government and diplomatic sites.

The Iraqi federal government condemned attacks on its territory, saying it would not allow Iraq to be used as a base for cross‑border strikes and calling for restraint while coordinating security with international partners. Iraqi Prime Minister Mohammed Shia' al-Sudani condemned the strikes on the PMF, calling them a "systematic and repeated aggression" and a "desperate attempt to cause chaos and hit social peace." Iraqi national security advisor Qasim al-Araji condemned the strikes on the PMF as a "cowardly terrorist attack." In response to plans of a Kurdish offensive into Iran, al-Araji said that Iraq will not allow an invasion of Iran to be launched from its territory, and stated that Iran had requested that Iraqi forces move to the border between the Iraqi Kurdistan and Iran to impede any aggression by Kurdish forces.

The conflict caused temporary closures and disruptions at Iraqi airports, including Baghdad and Erbil, as airlines canceled or rerouted flights due to safety concerns. Iraq national team's head coach, Graham Arnold, urged FIFA to postpone the inter‑continental playoff of the 2026 FIFA World Cup qualification after airspace closures during the conflict prevented the squad from assembling, canceled a U.S. training camp, and left some players stranded or unable to obtain visas. However, despite these concerns, the Iraq Football Association confirmed that the team would instead travel to Mexico by private plane, with president Adnan Dirjal stating that FIFA had been cooperative in helping to overcome logistical difficulties and facilitate the squad's journey.

Iraqi authorities authorized all security forces, including the Popular Mobilization Forces (PMF), to respond to attacks under the principle of self-defense following strikes on their positions. Meanwhile, Gulf states and Jordan called on Iraq to take measures to halt attacks launched by Iran-aligned militias from its territory toward neighboring countries, warning that such activities risked further destabilizing the region.

On 31 March 2026, US freelance journalist Shelly Kittleson was kidnapped near the Baghdad Hotel, a suspect linked to Kata'ib Hezbollah, an Iranian-backed militia group, was arrested after the kidnappers' car crashed.

On 20 April, the US urged a defense contractor to evacuate its workers from Iraq out of fear of attacks from Iran-backed militias.

On 27 May, Muqtada al-Sadr announced the dissolution of Saraya al-Salam and its integration into Iraqi state security institutions, and urged all political parties and armed factions to surrender their weapons to the state. On 2 June, Asaib Ahl al-Haq and the Kata'ib al-Imam Ali announced that they would begin placing their weapons under state authority, while Kata'ib Hezbollah and Harakat Hezbollah al-Nujaba rejected disarmament and maintained their commitment to armed resistance activities. Saraya Awliya al-Dam said it would only disarm if Baghdad guaranteed full Iraqi sovereignty, ended foreign military presence, and strengthened Iraq's air defense capabilities.

== See also ==
- 2026 Iranian strikes on the Kurdistan Region
- 2026 United States–Israeli strikes on Iraq
- 2026 Kurdish–Iranian crisis
- Iran–Iraq relations
- List of country-specific articles on the 2026 Iran war
