= Consulate General of the United States in Erbil =

US diplomatic mission in the Kurdistan Region

Consulate General of the United States, Erbil
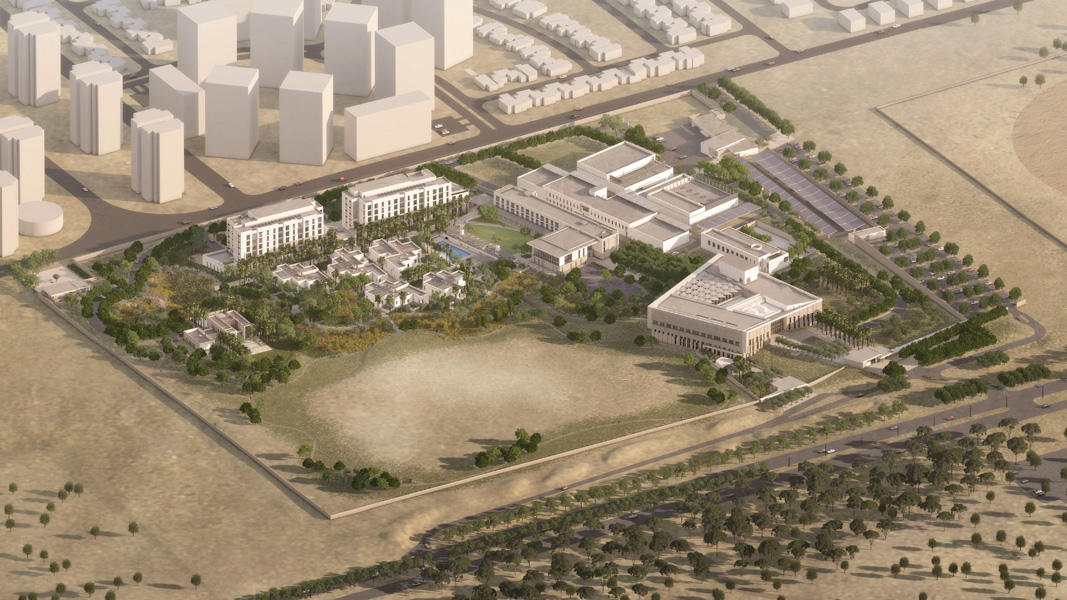
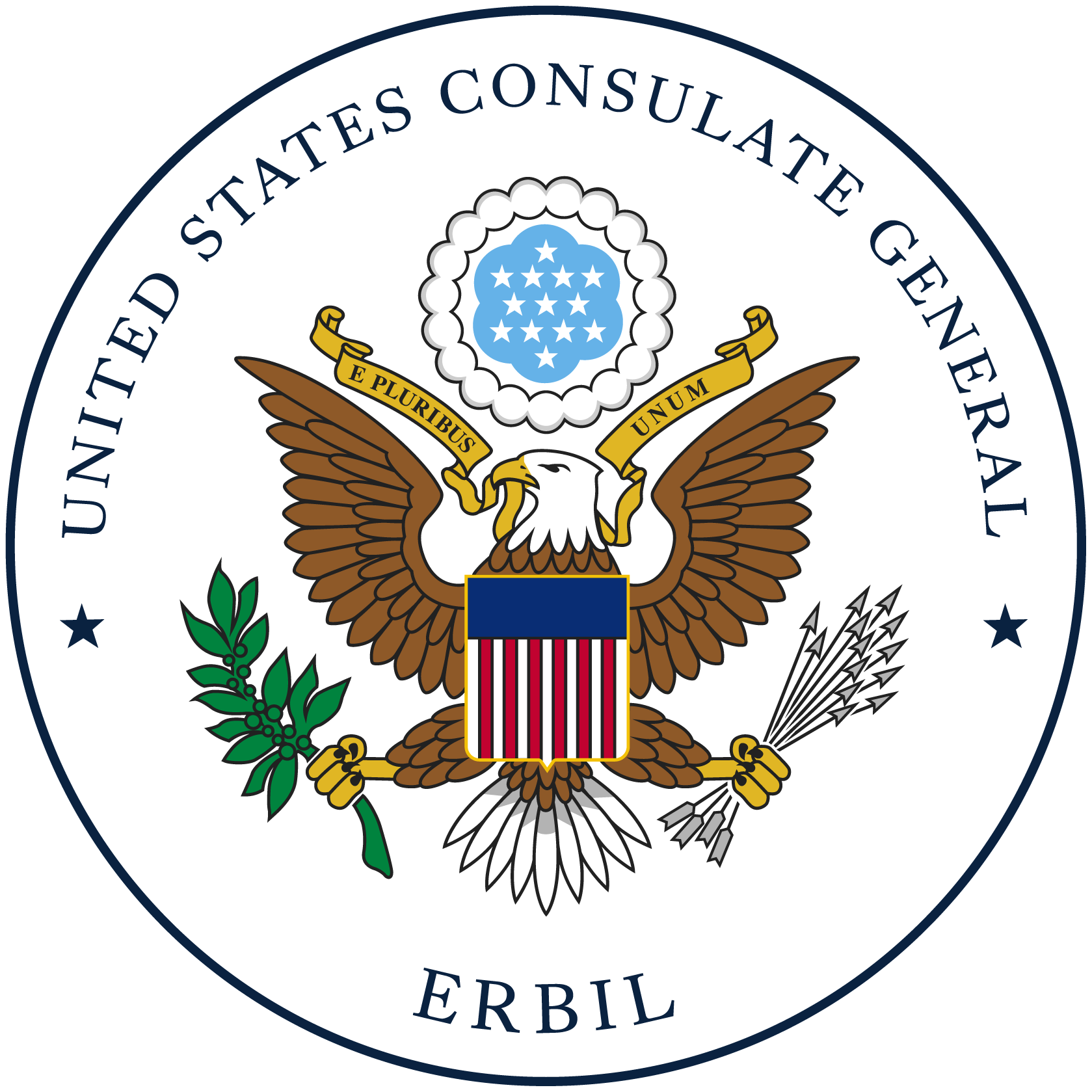
- 3D rendering of the new consulate compound
- Location: Erbil, Kurdistan Region, Iraq
- Address: Pirmam Road, Erbil
- Coordinates: 36.27552242040021°N 44.09614150285468°E
- Opened: 2008
- Relocated: 3 December 2025
- Jurisdiction: Kurdistan Region
- Consul General: Gwendolyn "Wendy" Green
- Website: https://iq.usembassy.gov/erbil/

The Consulate General of the United States in Erbil is the diplomatic mission of the United States of America to the Kurdistan Region, Iraq. Consul General Gwendolyn "Wendy" Green is currently the chief of mission. It is the largest US Consulate in the world and one of two diplomatic missions by the United States in Iraq.

The Consulate General in Erbil covers the four provinces of the Kurdistan Region (Erbil, Sulaimaniyah, Duhok, and Halabja) and houses political, economic, consular, public diplomacy, management, security, and rule of law sections, as well as the regional office of the United States Agency for International Development (USAID).

== History ==
=== 2008–2025: Former consulate ===
The US Consulate in the Kurdistan Region of Iraq, was first opened in 2008 in the neighborhood of Ankawa, Erbil. At times, the consulate was targeted by missile attacks from pro-Iran militias during the Twelve-Day War in June 2025.

=== 2025–present: New largest US Consulate General in the world ===
In 2018, the first foundations were laid for building a new 206,000-square-meter (2,220,000 sq ft) compound on the outskirts of north-eastern Erbil, at a cost of nearly $800 million, to replace the former consulate in Ankawa. Robert Palladino, then US Consul General to Erbil, stated that the United States was building its new and largest consulate in Erbil because the relationship between the United States and the Kurdistan Region "needs room to grow bigger."

Palladino, stated in September 2021 that the project would be completed by late 2022. However, a 2023 United States Department of Defense report noted that the project, originally scheduled for completion on April 11, 2022, was delayed due to the COVID-19 pandemic, security-related closures, and changes in scope, including additional diplomatic and technical security requirements.

In August 2025, the US Consulate General in Erbil announced Gwendolyn "Wendy" Green as the new U.S. Consul General.

On 3 December 2025, the new consulate compound was inaugurated. The inauguration ceremony was attended by top US officials, including, Deputy Secretary of State for Management and Resources Michael Rigas, Consul General Gwendolyn "Wendy" Green, and members of the Kurdistan Regional Government (KRG), including, Masoud Barzani, President Nechirvan Barzani, Prime Minister Masrour Barzani, and Deputy Prime Minister Qubad Talabani.

From February 28 to March 2, 2026, several drones were shot down over Erbil after Iran launched aerial attacks on US presence in the region, including near the newly built U.S. Consulate General and Erbil International Airport, following the 2026 Iran war.

== See also ==
- Foreign relations of Kurdistan Region
- Embassy of the United States, Baghdad
