= Sovereignty Day (Iraq) =

National holiday in Iraq

Iraq's Sovereignty Day
- Official name: يوم السيادة العراقي (Yowm as-Siyadah al-Iraqi)
- Observed by: Iraq
- Type: National
- Significance: Completion of the U.S.-led international coalition military withdrawal from Iraq
- Begins: 30 September
- Ends: 3 October
- Date: 30 September
- Duration: 4 days
- Frequency: Annual
- First time: 30 September 2026

Iraq's Sovereignty Day (Arabic: يوم السيادة العراقي) is a national holiday in Iraq established to mark the end of American military presence in the country on 30 September 2026.

== Background ==
Following an agreement made by Iraqi Prime Minister Ali al-Zaidi with President Donald Trump for all American and Coalition forces to be removed from Iraq by 30 September 2026.

The Iraqi Government declared this as a four-day holiday from 30 September till 3 October, ending in the same day as Iraq's National Day.

This topic was first brought up in September 2024.
