= Withdrawal of United States troops from Iraq (2025–2026) =

U.S. Withdrawal of Iraq

- Part of Iraqi conflict, Iraqi insurgency (2017–present), Attacks on US bases during the Middle Eastern crisis in Iraq
Date	18 August 2025 – 30 September 2026 (1 year, 1 month, 1 week and 5 days)
Location	Iraq
Result	Full withdrawal of U.S. forces on 30 September 2026; Conclusion of Operation Inherent Resolve in Iraq

After a major withdrawal of combat troops in Iraq in 2021, Iraq and the U.S. began discussing the complete withdrawal of American troops from Iraq in September 2024. In September 2024, President Joe Biden announced that he would end the U.S. mission in Iraq by 2026. Following the election of president Donald Trump, the withdrawal continued and was completed in September 2026.

== Background ==
The United States completed its first withdrawal of troops in December 2011, concluding the Iraq War.

In October 2014, the United States formed Combined Joint Task Force – Operation Inherent Resolve (CJTF-OIR) and re-intervened at the request of the Iraqi government due to the rise of the Islamic State of Iraq and the Levant (ISIL). Iran also intervened in Iraq in June 2014. On 9 December 2017, Iraq declared victory against ISIS, concluding the 2013–2017 War in Iraq and commencing the latest Islamic State (IS) insurgency in Iraq.

In March 2020, the U.S.-led coalition, Combined Joint Task Force – Operation Inherent Resolve (CJTF–OIR), began transferring control over a number of military installations back to Iraqi security forces, citing developments in the multi-year mission against the Islamic State (IS). By 4 April 2020, four bases had been transferred. The base transfers and withdrawal were accelerated due to the COVID-19 pandemic in Iraq and the threat of Iranian proxy elements.

In February 2021, NATO announced it would expand its mission to train Iraqi forces in their fight against the Islamic State. In December 2021, U.S. Central Command stated that there were no plans for a total withdrawal of U.S. forces from Iraq, citing continued threats posed by ISIS.

In December 2021 the U.S. ended the combat mission.

From 2023 to 2024 there were attacks on U.S. bases; like Al-Asad air base and Al-Harir air base.

== Withdrawal ==
=== August 2025: Start of the withdrawal ===
U.S. troops first withdrawal from Al-Asad Airbase.

=== January 2026: First base full withdrawal in Iraq ===
The U.S. fully transfers Al-Asad Airbase, ending presence in most of Iraq except Kurdistan Region.

=== March 2026: The Iran war in Iraq ===
There have been attacks on U.S. bases in Iraq since the 2026 Iran war started as Iran aligned Iraqi groups fire at American military personnel and infrastructure and is hit back by them. Since March 2026 NATO has no troops in Iraq due to the Iran war.

=== July 2026: Complete withdrawal reaffirmed by Iraq ===
During Iraqi Prime Minister Ali al-Zaidi's visit to Washington, the United States and Iraq reaffirmed that all remaining U.S. military forces would withdraw from Iraq by 30 September 2026, marking the end of the U.S.-led military mission in the country.

=== September 2026: Complete withdrawal is finalized ===
All remaining U.S. forces withdrew from Kurdistan Region on 30 September 2026, marking the end of the withdrawal process. A small contingent of U.S. troops responsible for protecting diplomats remain.

This withdrawal led to a new Iraqi holiday known as Iraq's Sovereignty Day, which is a four-day long Holiday beginning from 30 September 2026. The Iraqi security forces held parades in Baghdad and Najaf to celebrate the holiday. Iraqis were seen celebrating including in Baghdad and Basra were civilians flew flags belonging to Shi'ite Militias and portraits of militia leaders.

Iraqi parade celebrating the withdrawal of US military forces.

== See also ==
- Withdrawal of United States troops from Iraq (2020–2021)
