= Saraya Awliya al-Dam =

Iraqi Shi'ite militia

- Other name: SAD
- Leader: Abu Mahdi al-Ja'afari
- Founded: August 2020
- Country: Iraq
- Ideology: Shia Islam; Anti-Zionism
- Part of: Popular Mobilization Forces: Islamic Resistance in Iraq
- Wars: Iraqi conflict; Sectarian violence in Iraq; 2026 Iran war; 2026 Iranian strikes on the Kurdistan Region

Saraya Awliya al-Dam (Arabic: سرايا أولياء الدم), also referred to by the abbreviation SAD, is a Shi'ite pro-Iran militia based in Iraq. The organization is known for its counter-U.S. operations in northern Iraq, specifically in the Kurdistan Region.

In 2021, the group claimed responsibility for the 2021 Erbil rocket attacks, which killed two civilians and injured six more, including an American soldier.

== History ==
SAD has been described as "a relatively new player" in the Iraqi conflict. The first operation of Saraya Awliya al-Dam occurred on 24 August 2020, when they attacked a group of Iraqi trucks that may have been carrying U.S. goods. The organization confirmed they were responsible.

On 6 January 2021, another attack was launched by SAD on another convoy of trucks.

The day after the 2021 Erbil rocket attacks, SAD claimed responsibility for the airstrikes. It was the most serious attack on the coalition since the Biden administration began. SAD proclaimed:

The American occupation will not be safe from our strikes in any inch of the homeland, even in Kurdistan, where we promise we will carry out other qualitative operations.

The group claimed two attacks in March 2026, following the outbreak of the 2026 Iran war; one attack, on 2 March, took place near Baghdad International Airport, while another attack took place the previous day at a US base in northern Iraq.

On 17 March 2026, the group published a footage of a reconnaissance drone flying above the US embassy compound in Baghdad. According to an observer the footage is consistent with the footage obtained from a Fiber optic drone suggesting that the group had acquired such advanced technology. A few weeks later, on 5 April, the group claimed responsibility for drone strikes against the Ali Al Salem Air Base in Kuwait, Muwaffaq Salti Air Base in Jordan, and Qasrak Base in Syria, all of which were used by U.S. forces.

== Foreign relations ==
SAD officially supports Iran, and is often classified as an Iranian proxy. Iranian officials have denied allegations by some Iraqi politicians that they have ties to the group. SAD may also have ties to Kataib Hezbollah, which officially backs Iran.[16] The Washington Institute for Near East Policy profile states that Kurdish intelligence later extracted confessions from accused perpetrators of the February 2021 Erbil attack who claimed to belong to Kata'ib Sayyid al-Shuhada.

The SAD is generally considered to be at odds with Turkey, and could possibly pose a threat to Turkey–Iran relations in the future. After the Erbil attacks, the SAD announced that they "only targeted American, Turkish, and Israeli occupation bases." The journalist Shelly Kittleson commented:

Though many armed groups and others in the country have, for more than a decade, demanded an end to the "American-Israeli occupation", the addition of "Turkish" is significant.

Many commentators have suggested that SAD could be a front for the Popular Mobilization Forces (PMF).

Reports by the Washington Institute suggested that they might have connections to Asaib Ahl al-Haq, an Iraqi Shi'a paramilitary, which is classified as a terrorist organization by the United States.

== Criticism ==
Many critics have described it as a terrorist group. Other commentators have accused Iran of denying their alleged ties to the SAD.

== Social media ==
The militia has a Telegram account, which has been repeatedly noted by different news sources.
