= Barzani Charity Foundation =

Kurdish-Iraqi charity

- Barzani Charity Foundation
- دەزگای خێرخوازیی بارزانی
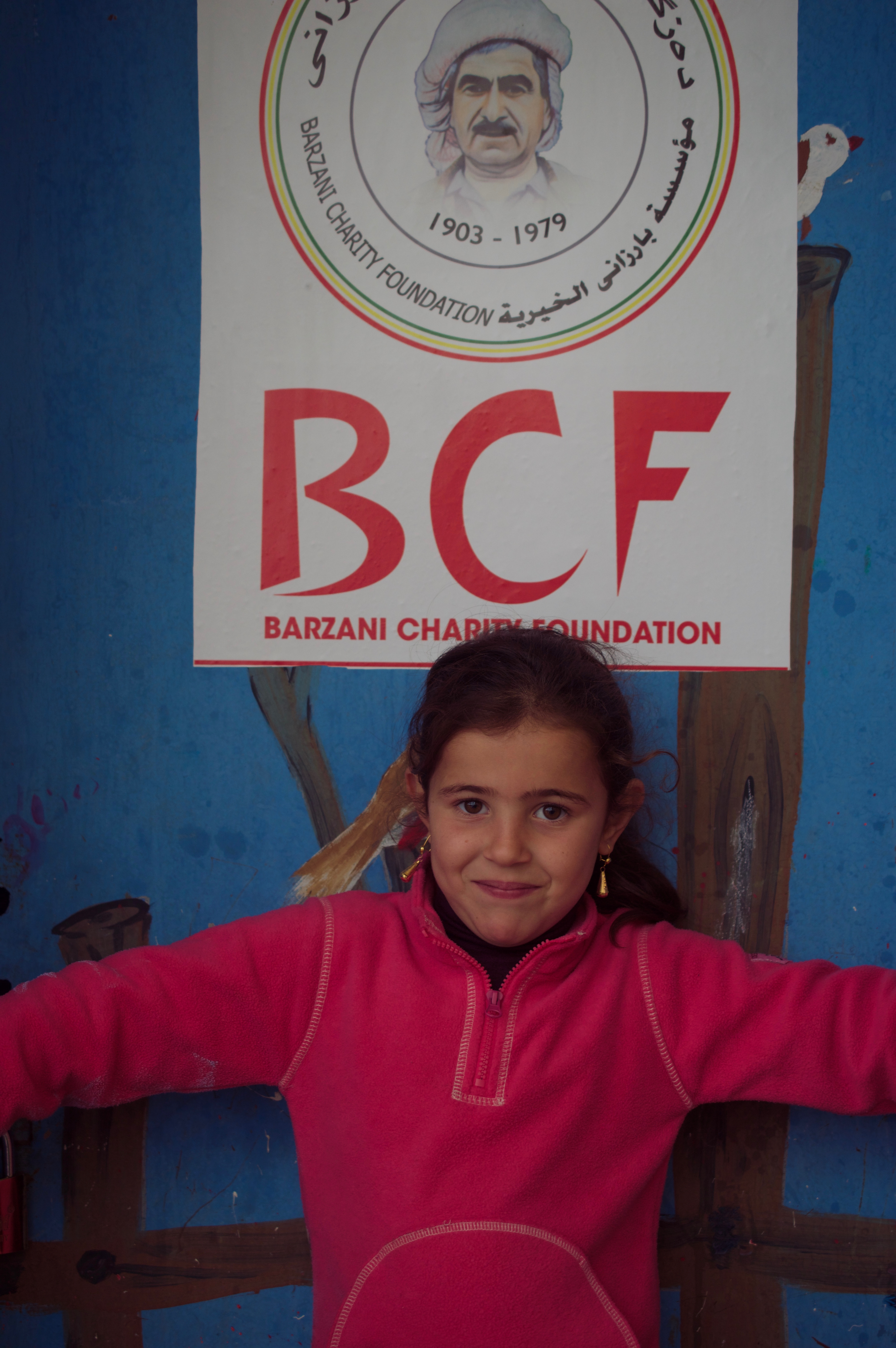
- Akre Camp for Syrian refugees from Rojava, managed by BCF
- Abbreviation: BCF
- Named after: Mustafa Barzani
- Formation: January 1, 2005; 21 years ago
- Founded at: Erbil, Kurdistan Region of Iraq
- Type: Humanitarian NGO
- Legal status: Non-profit
- Purpose: Humanitarian aid for refugees and internally displaced persons (IDPs)
- Headquarters: Erbil, Kurdistan Region of Iraq
- Locations: Erbil, Iraq; Duhok, Iraq; Sulaymaniyah, Iraq; Sinjar, Germany, Iraq, Germany
- Origins: Founded in response to regional humanitarian needs after the Iraq War (2003)
- Region served: Kurdistan Region of Iraq, broader Iraq, refugee and IDP communities
- Services: Refugee and IDP support, camp management, humanitarian aid
- Methods: Direct relief, coordination with government agencies and NGOs
- Fields: Refugees, IDPs, humanitarian non-profit NGO
- Official language: Kurdish, Arabic, English
- President: Musa Ahmad
- Head of Board of Founders: Masrour Barzani
- Key people: Musa Ahmad, Masrour Barzani
- Main organ: Board of Founders
- Affiliations: UN ECOSOC (Consultative Status)
- Funding: Donations, partnerships, international aid
- Staff: 1500
- Website: www.bcf.krd
- Remarks: Manages 13 camps in cooperation with Erbil Joint Crisis Coordination Centre (EJCC)

The Barzani Charity Foundation (Kurdish: دەزگای خێرخوازیی بارزانی ), or (Arabic: مٶسسة بارزاني الخیریة) is a non-governmental and non-profit organization which was founded in 2005 in Erbil, the capital city of the Kurdistan Region of Iraq. Masrour Barzani is the head of BCF's Board of Founders and directly oversees the operation of this foundation.

The BCF has legal permission to work as a charitable non-governmental organization from both the Iraqi Government and the KRG. The BCF has been granted a Consultative Status at the United Nations Economic and Social Council (ECOSOC) in the organization's meeting in April 2016.

Barzani Charity Foundation has been named after the Kurdish leader Mustafa Barzani (1903–1979). The working philosophy of the foundation is based on a statement by Barzani where he says "It is a privilege to serve one's own people".

The economic and social condition of the Kurdistan Region-Iraq have contributed in the establishment of the BCF. As by the time the BCF was founded in 2005 the Region was experiencing a new phase of the political and economic arena in Iraq. The post-2003 situation invited many corporate companies, governments and international NGOs to the region to contribute to the reconstruction process there. This has perhaps, contributed in the foundation of the BCF at the time. The post-2003 Iraq experienced massive displacements and migration both from within Iraq (as the result of armed conflict there) and outside Iraq, especially, the state of Syria (as the result of the armed conflict between the Syrian government and opposition parties). The large number of displaced and refugee people required swift response on the part of the Iraqi government, the KRG and NGOs and INGOs.

The BCF's headquarters is in Erbil, the capital city of the KRI and it has offices in Duhok, Sulaymaniyah, the Sinjar Mountain and Germany. In addition, in cooperation with Erbil Joint Crisis Coordination Centre (EJCC), the BCF manages (13) camps within Erbil Governorate. The BCF also maintains offices at all camps in the KRI.
