= Hadid 110 =

Iranian military drone

Hadid-110 is a jet-powered one-way attack drone and is known as Iran’s fastest stealth drone, with a speed of over 510 km/h, carrying a 30-kg warhead. The drone’s design aims to increase the likelihood of penetrating enemy airspace, reduce the reaction time of air defense systems, and increase its effectiveness in modern battles. Compared to previous Iranian drones (such as the Shahed 136 with a speed of about 185 km/h), the Hadid-110 is much faster and is designed for operations against sensitive targets such as radars, command centers, and important infrastructure. Iran used the drone as part of a show of force in the presence of various member or observer states of the Shanghai Cooperation Organization to convey a political and strategic message (not just a technical demonstration).

== Operational history ==
=== 2026 Iran war ===
The IRGC Ground Force first used the Hadid-110 in March 2026 during "Operation True Promise IV." This was in response to attacks on Iranian facilities on February 28, 2026. Reports say that Iran's drone warfare strategy changed with the deployment. The Hadid-110's high speed and low radar cross-section make it possible for it to get through layered air defense networks.

On 28 July 2026, The Telegraph reported that Iran's Hadid 110 drone had been upgraded and now flies lower, flies faster, and is harder to detect. According to the report, the drone is an advanced version of the standard Hadid 110, using a jet engine with a top speed of over 300 mph, and is designed to penetrate U.S. air defense systems.

On 17 August, two Hadid 110 drones were reportedly used in strikes against the Kurdistan Region in Iraq, targeting the office of Kurdistan Region Prime Minister Masrour Barzani and the residence of the director of Parastin. The attack didn't result in any casualties or major damage.
