= Masrour Barzani =

Prime Minister of Iraqi Kurdistan since 2019

- مەسرور بارزانی
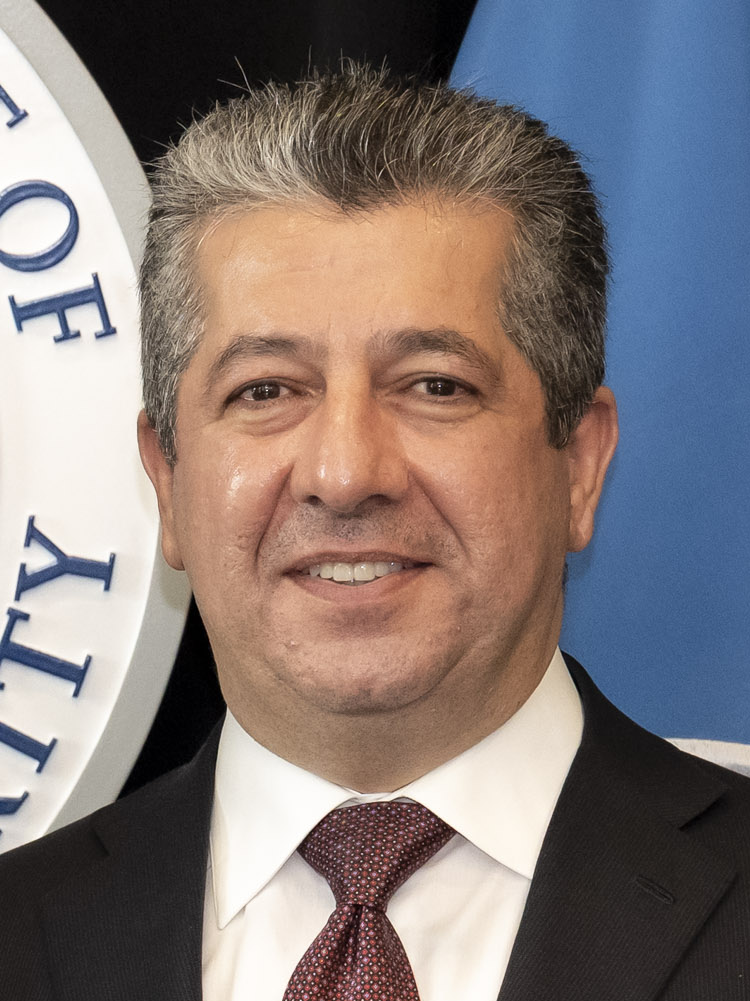
- Barzani in Washington, D.C. in 2025

Prime Minister of Kurdistan Region
- Incumbent
- Assumed office 10 June 2019
- President: Nechirvan Barzani
- Deputy: Qubad Talabani
- Preceded by: Nechirvan Barzani

Personal details
- Born: 2 March 1969 (age 57) Choman, Iraq
- Party: Kurdistan Democratic Party
- Relations: Nechirvan Barzani (cousin); Sirwan Barzani (cousin); Mansour Barzani (brother)
- Education: American University (AB)
- Website: Personal Twitter

Masrour Barzani (Arabic: مسرور بارزاني; Kurdish: مەسروور بارزانی, romanized: Mesrûr Barzanî; born 2 March 1969) is a Kurdish politician and serving as prime minister of the Kurdistan Region, since June 2019. He is also the chancellor of the Kurdistan Region Security Council and a member of the Kurdistan Democratic Party. He was sworn in as prime minister of the KRG's ninth cabinet on 10 June 2019, after receiving 87 votes out of 97 legislators in the Kurdistan parliament.

In March 2026 Barzani was sued by a New York-based technology company for fraud. In May 2026, a 230-page US court document was released highlighting his involvement in illegal activities.

== Early life and education ==
Masrour is the son of Masoud Barzani. He joined the Kurdish resistance fighters, known as Peshmerga or "those who face death", in 1985 at the age of 16. He was an active participant in the Battle of Khwakurk against Saddam Hussein's army in 1988. He also participated in the 1991 uprising against Saddam Hussein after the first Gulf War and filmed both events.

Despite this irregular childhood given the tumultuous nature of the Kurdish resistance, Barzani was able to complete his high school education in Iran. After seeing peace restored to the region in 1992, he went to London for a year-long course in English. Having successfully completed this, he continued on to receive a bachelor's degree with honors in International Studies from the American University in Washington, D.C. He continued studying Peace and Conflict Resolutions for his post graduate studies.

During his time in Washington, Barzani was actively involved in improving understanding of the Kurdish plight in America. He also established a Barzani Scholar-in-Residence program at American University in order to continue these efforts into the future.

== Political career ==
In 1998, he returned to Kurdistan Region and was elected by the KDP's 12th Congress to the Central Committee. Later that same year he became part of the Kurdistan Democratic Party Leadership before being appointed as General Director of the Protection and Intelligence Agency. In 2010, he received the highest votes of the 13th Congress, was reelected to the Leadership Council and then selected as one of the Politburo members of the KDP. In 2012, he was appointed by his father Kurdistan Region President Masoud Barzani as Chancellor of the Kurdistan Region Security Council to oversee security, military intelligence and existing intelligence services.

Under his stewardship, women have been officially added to the Kurdish security services. He was a vocal critic of many of the proposals found in the Iraq Study Group, authoring a Washington Post op-ed on the subject.

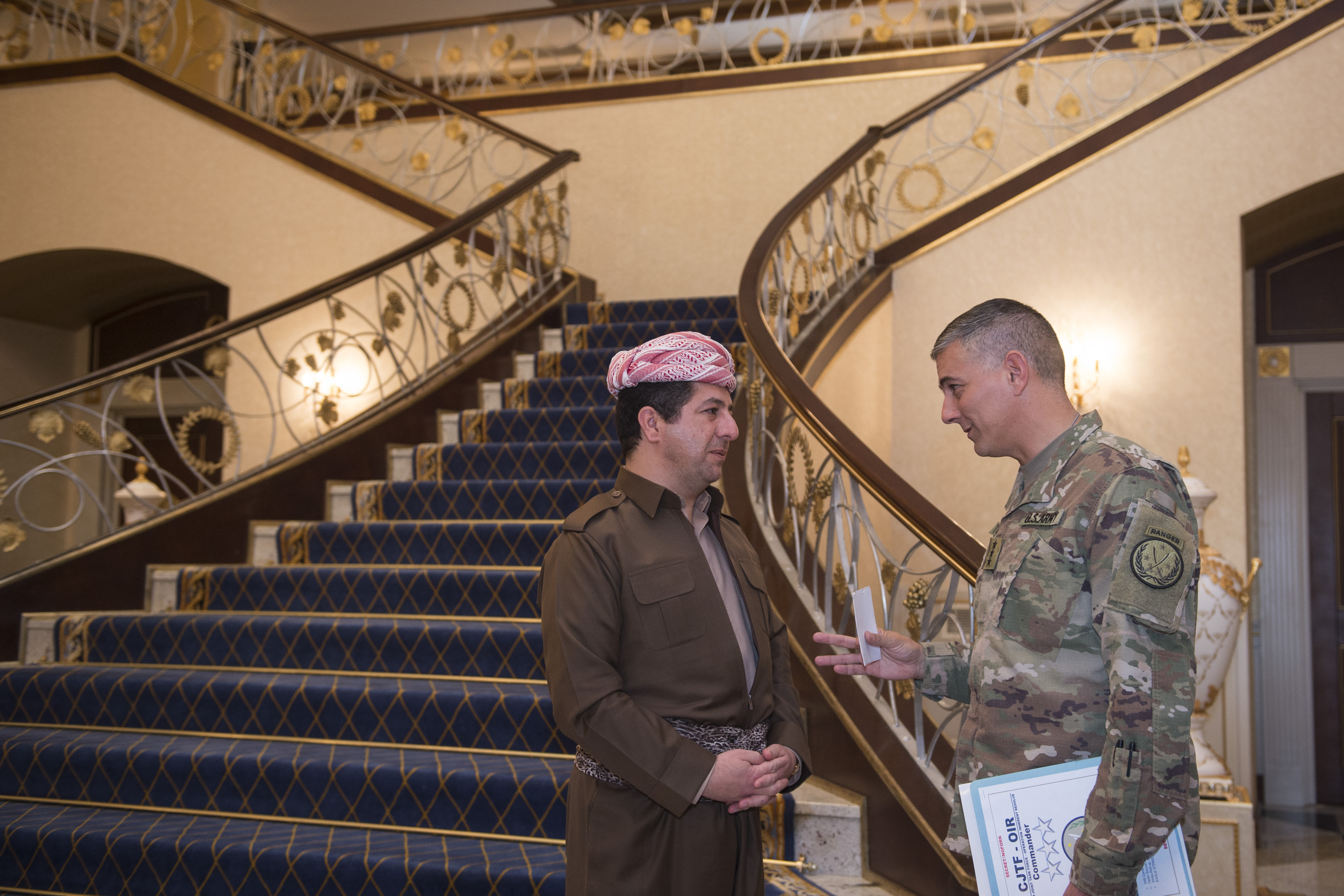
Barzani (left) with US Army General Stephen Townsend in 2016

Barzani has also been credited with working to ensure that veterans of the Kurdish struggle who are members of his father's political party receive their pensions. In a January 2010 interview with the Jamestown Foundation, Masrour Barzani said that the Iraqi Constitution has laid out a clear solution for the status of the city of Kirkuk and other disputed areas.

In May 2016, Barzani authored a second op-ed in the Washington Post advocating an 'amicable' separation of Iraqi Kurdistan from the rest of Iraq. He called Iraq 'a conceptual failure, compelling peoples with little in common to share an uncertain future,' and announced the beginning of talks with the Iraqi Government in the lead up to a referendum.

== Barzani Charity Foundation (BCF) ==
In 2005, he founded the Barzani Charity Foundation in Iraqi Kurdistan. The non-profit charity organization provides aid to the internally displaced, refugees as well as vulnerable locals, and is modeled on the life, struggle and principles of his Grandfather Mustafa Barzani. Its Orphan Sponsorship Program provides a monthly stipend to cover living expenses, health care and education to orphans.

== Fight against ISIS ==
Masrour Barzani is one of the most important figures in the international coalition against ISIS. His Security Council, and its elite special forces is attached to the Counter-Terrorism Department (CTD), which has led targeted airstrikes against senior Daesh figures in Iraq and Syria, and rescue missions of hostages. In April 2026, his brother Mansour Barzani was implicated in a corruption case for allegedly defrauding the US federal government during its fight against ISIS by siphoning funds for personal use, which included buying a mansion in Beverly Hills.

== The American University of Kurdistan (AUK) ==
Masrour Barzani is the chairman of the Board of Trustees of The American University of Kurdistan (AUK). He laid the cornerstone of the project during a ceremony in Duhok province in December 2013.

== Kurdistan Region Premiership ==
Following a KDP leadership meeting on 3 December 2018, the party's spokesperson Mahmoud Mohammed named Masrour Barzani for the post of the region's Prime Minister position. in June 2019, Masrour Barzani officially elected as prime minister of Kurdistan Region of Iraq.

In August 2026 amidst the Iran war and the strikes on Iraqi Kurdistan a Hadid 110 kamikaze drone struck his residence.

== See also ==
- Barzani Family
