= Gomaspan Dam =

Dam in Erbil, Iraq

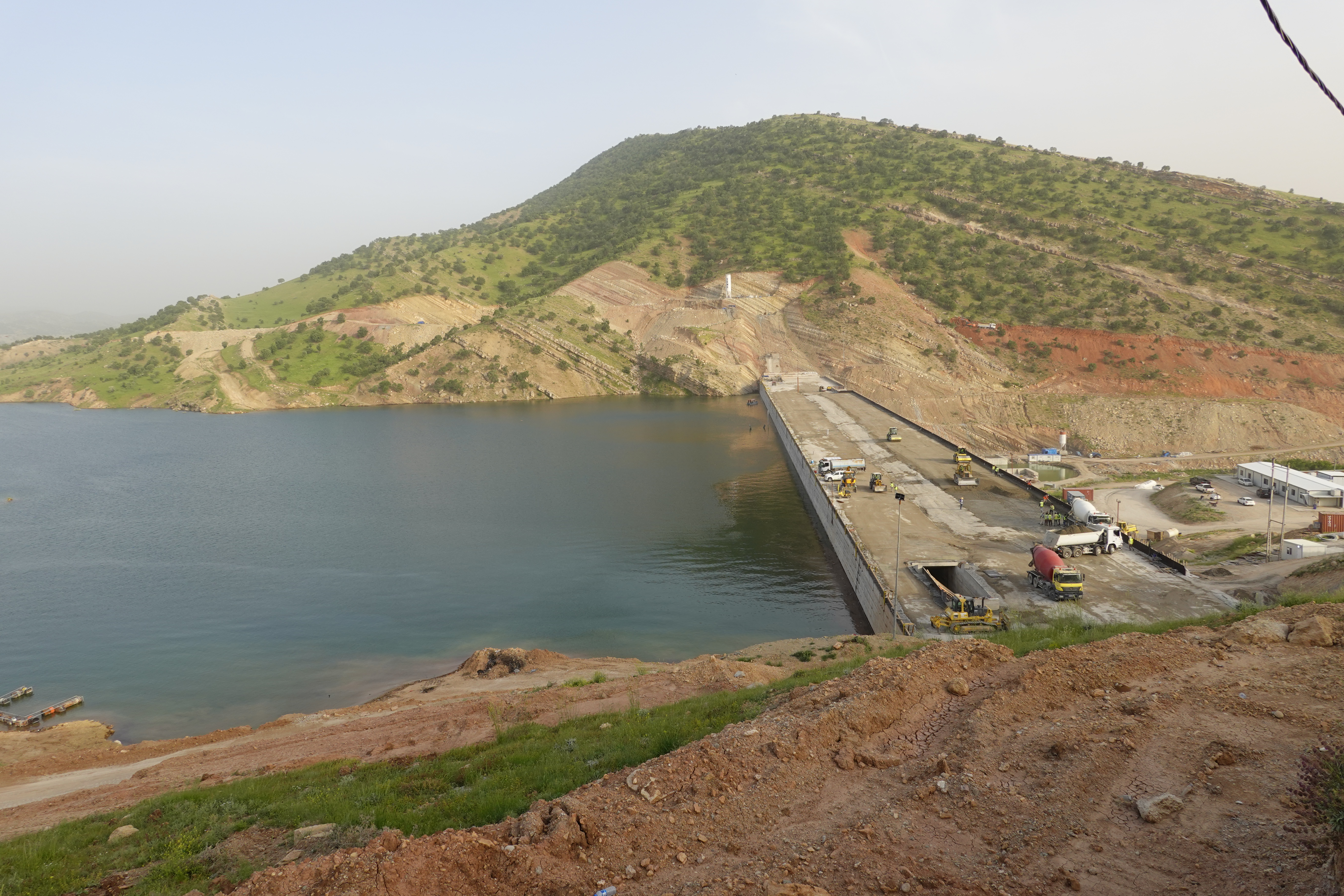
- Gomaspan Dam under construction (April 2024)

- Location within Iraq
- Country: Iraq
- Location: Gomaspan, Erbil Governorate, Kurdistan Region
- Coordinates: 36°16′40″N 44°19′54″E
- Purpose: Water supply
- Status: Operational
- Construction began: 2013
- Opening date: October 16, 2024 (20 months ago)
- Construction cost: $85.5 million

Dam and spillways
- Type of dam: Gravity, roller-compacted concrete
- Impounds: Bastora River
- Height: 85 m (279 ft)
- Length: 577 m (1,893 ft)
- Elevation at crest: 874 m
- Width (crest): 10 m
- Dam volume: 1,223,000 m^{3} (1,600,000 cu yd)
- Spillway capacity: 313 m^{3}/s

Reservoir
- Total capacity: 215,000,000 m^{3} (174,000 acre⋅ft)
- Normal elevation: 868.5 m

Power Station
- Commission date: 2018 est.
- Type: Conventional
- Turbines: 2 x 1.2 MW Francis-type
- Installed capacity: 2.4 MW

The Gomaspan Dam is a gravity dam currently being constructed on the Bastora River at Goma span gorge, near Gomespan, in Erbil Governorate, Kurdistan Region, Iraq. It is located about 30 km (19 mi) northeast of Erbil.

The primary purpose of the dam is water supply for irrigation but it will support a small 2.4 MW hydroelectric power station. It is expected to irrigate 4,000 ha (9,900 acres). Construction on the 85 m (279 ft) tall roller-compacted concrete dam began in 2013 and completed in 2024.

== Gallery ==
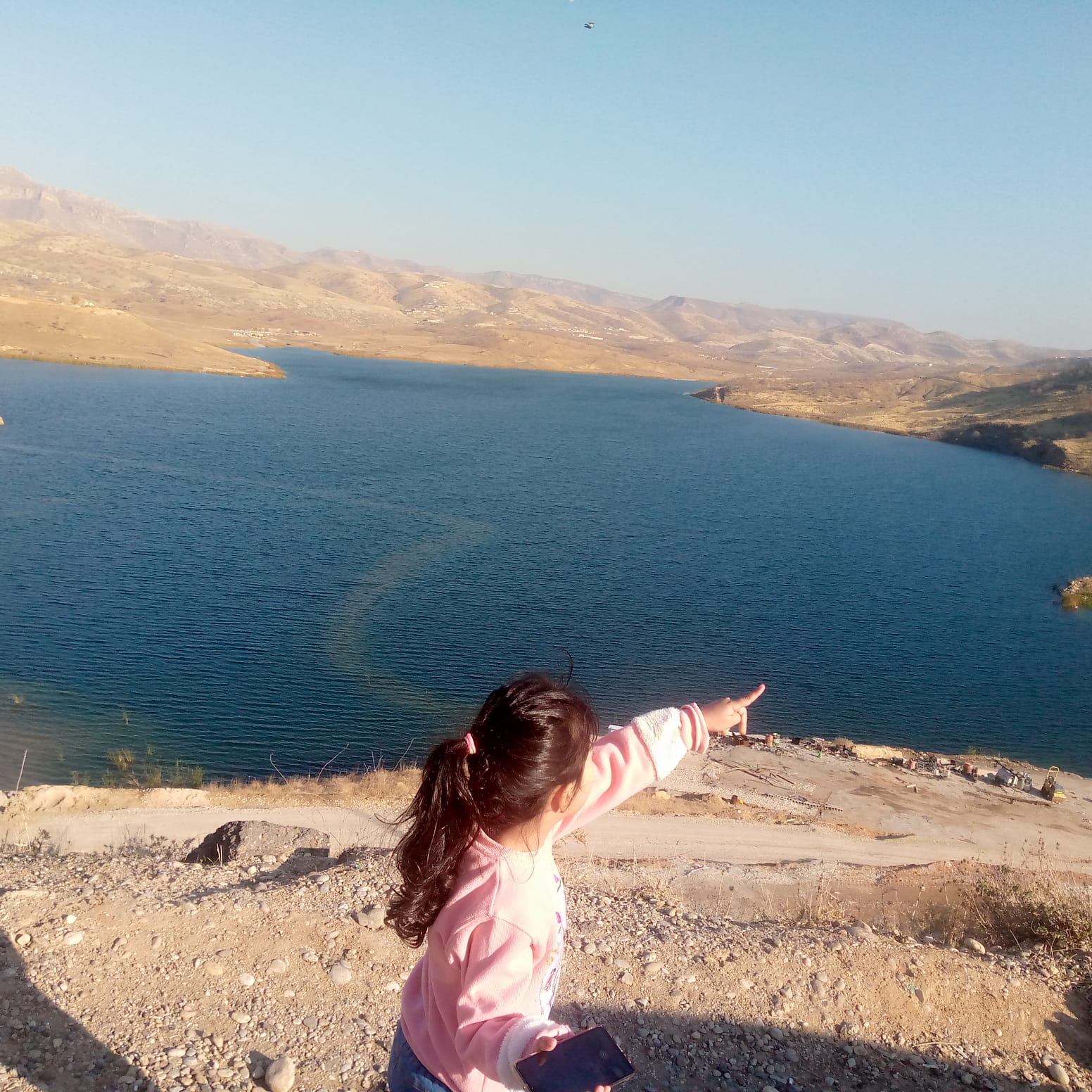
Gomaspan Dam

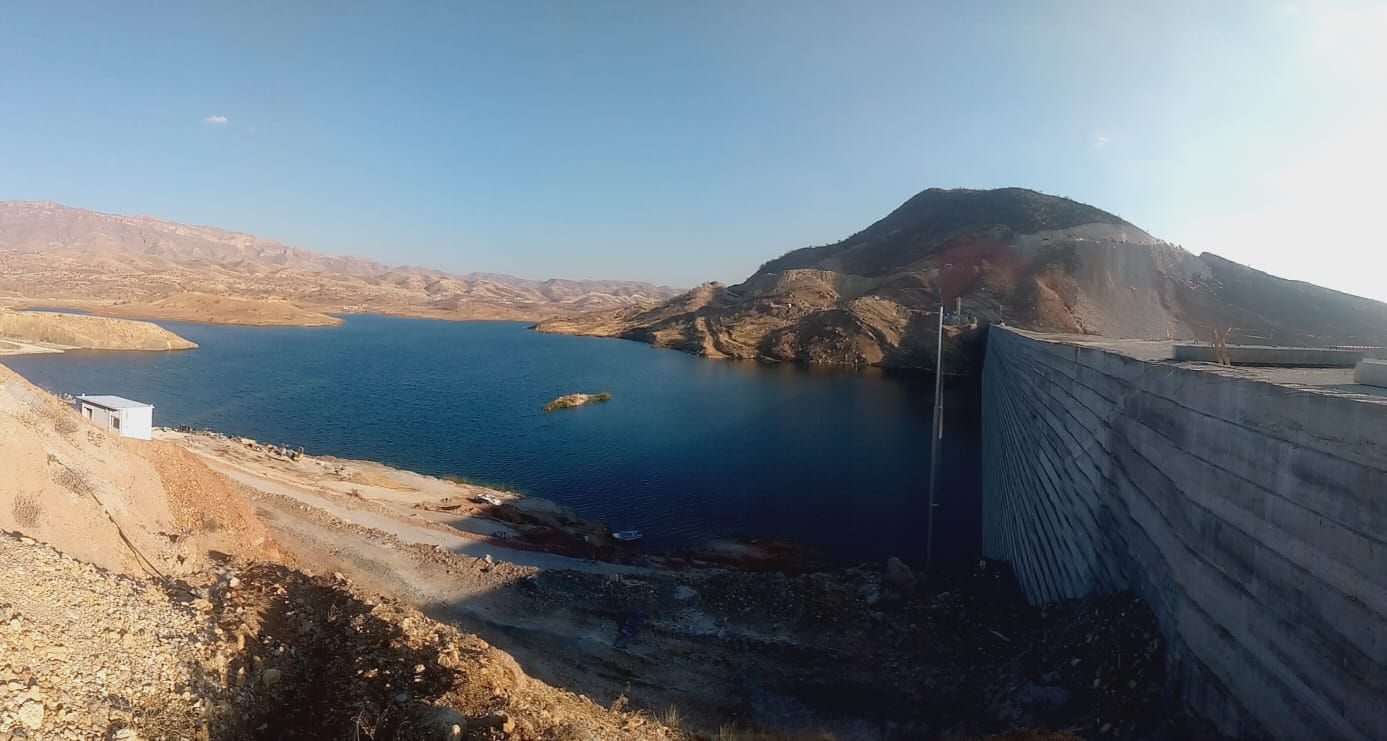
Gomaspan Dam

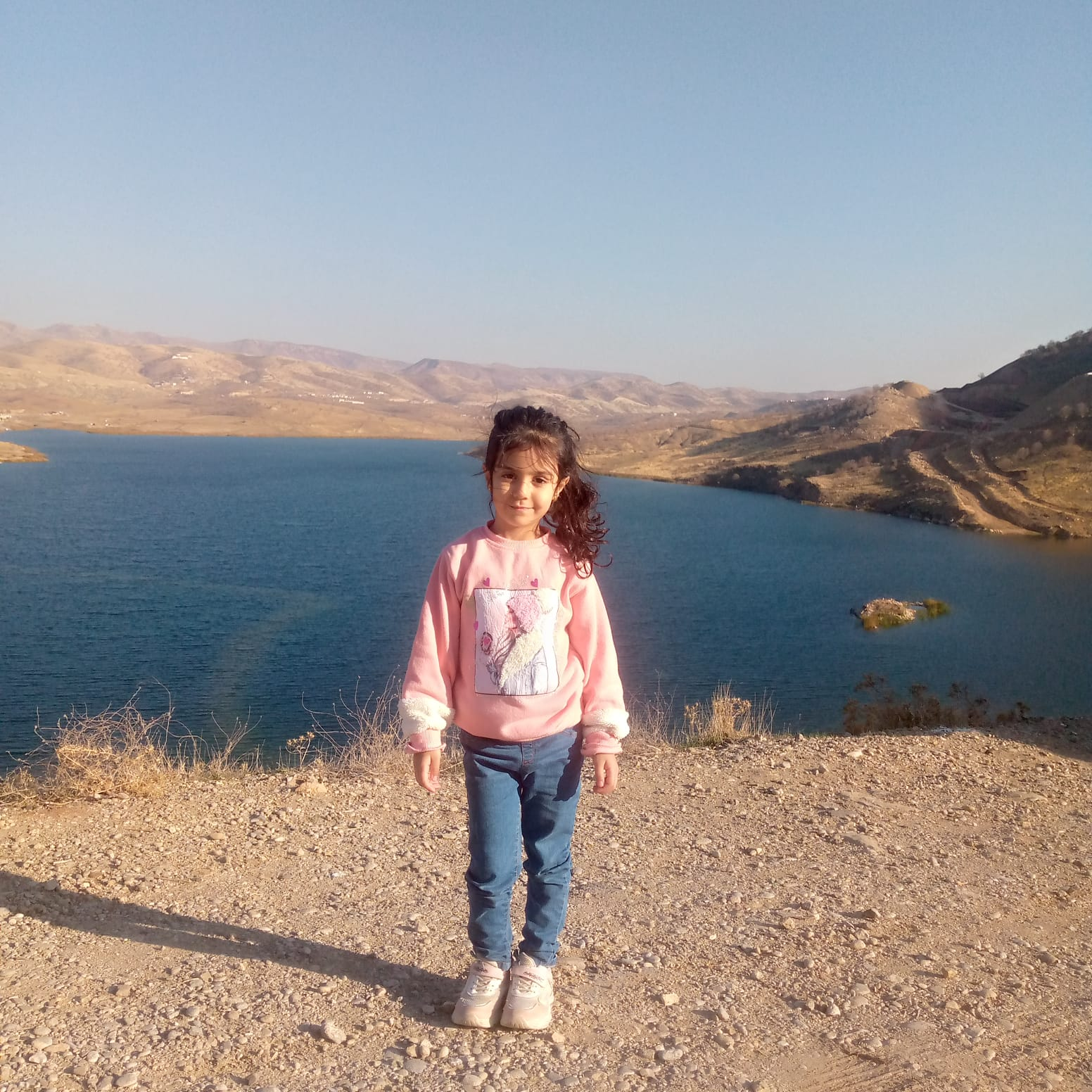
Gomaspan Dam
