= Iraqi National Day =

National day of Iraq

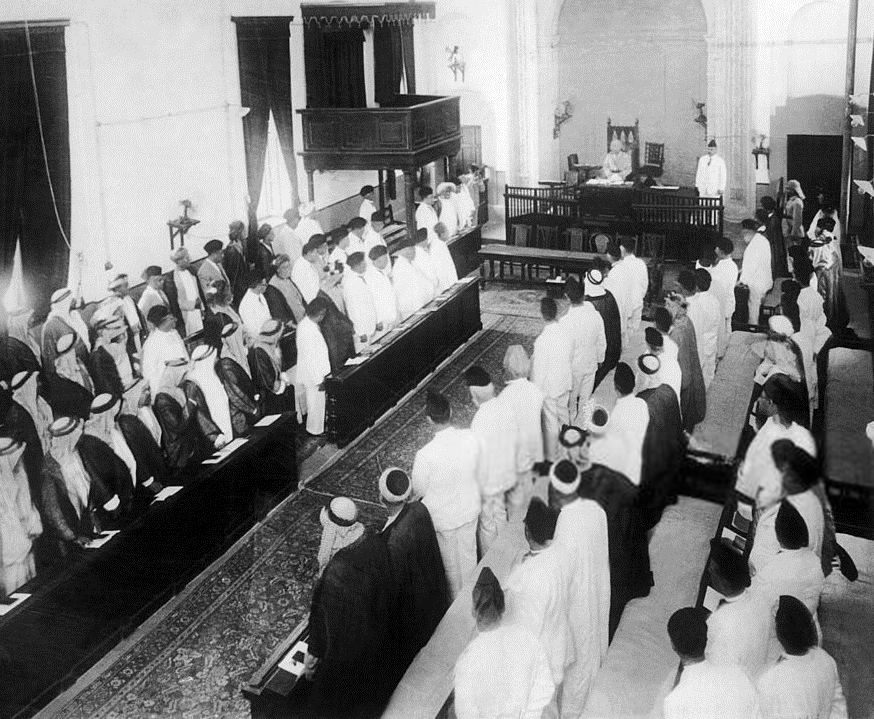
- King Faisal I of Iraq addressing the Iraqi parliament following international recognition, Baghdad, Kingdom of Iraq, October 1932
- Observed by: Iraq
- Type: National
- Significance: Historical milestone marking the entry of Iraq into the League of Nations as a fully sovereign power following the conclusion of the Mandate for Mesopotamia in 1932
- Celebrations: Cultural festivals, flag raising ceremonies, community gatherings, musical performances of the national anthem, and public holiday observances
- Date: 3 October

Iraqi National Day (اليوم الوطني العراقي), is a national holiday in Iraq, that is annually celebrated every 3 October. This day commemorates a milestone in Iraq's history, when the country first joined the League of Nations in 1932 as a fully sovereign power. Rather than the creation of the nation, succeeding the previous League of Nations Mandate for Mesopotamia, and becoming the first sovereign Arab nation to join the League of Nations.

== Historical background ==
The modern state of Iraq is built upon the geographical, cultural, political identity and heritage rooted in Mesopotamia. Long before the 20th century, the region kept a localised and semi independent way of governance that built the structure for the Unified state.

=== Statehood continuity ===
Most of Iraq was under the Ottoman Empire, which classified the region as "Iraq region" ( Irak Kıt'ası ) which included the Vilayets of Mosul, Baghdad and Basra. The governance for the Ottoman regions of Iraq were governed mostly by powerful indigenous locals and Emirates (Khaza'il & Muntafiq). This indigenous authority and power in Iraq (alongside the Mamluk Dynasty of Iraq), proved that distinct political authority and framework already existed in the region, before any Western interventions.

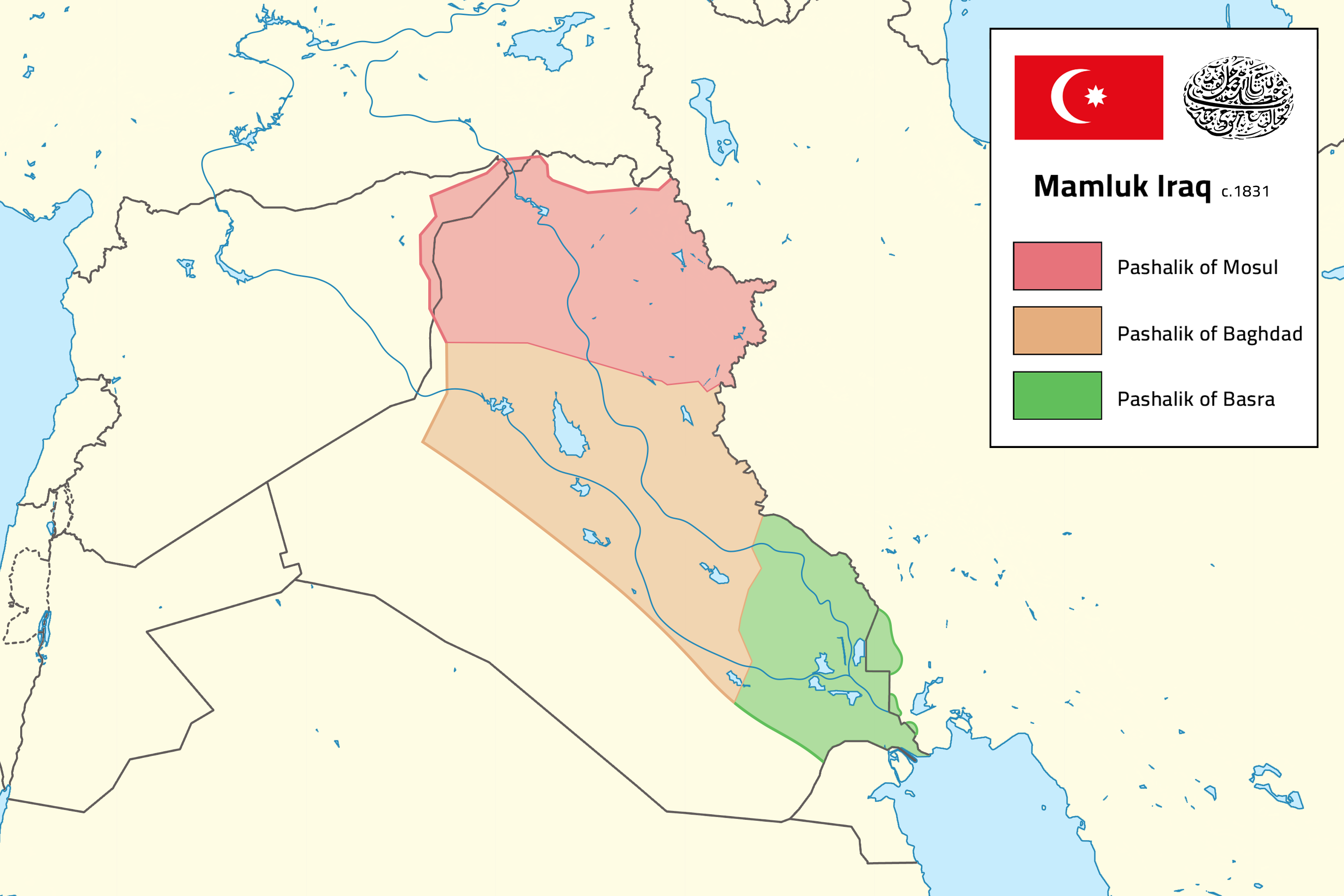
Map of the Mamluk dynasty of Iraq in 1831

=== The transition to modern statehood ===
Following World War I and the break up of the Ottoman Empire alongside the Emirates in Iraq, the League of Nations placed Iraq under a temporary administrative system known as the Mandate for Mesopotamia, this mandate faced extreme resistance from the local population, most famously being the 1920 Iraqi Revolt, this rebellion forced the establishment of the Kingdom of Iraq under the Hashemite king Faisal I of Iraq by allowing decisions made by the locals. Fully international recognition was made via the Anglo-Iraqi treaty in 1930, which led to the full termination of the Mandate of Mesopotamia, and led to Iraq having a seat in the League of Nations under Article 22 of the Covenant of the League of Nations, and being the first Arab state to have this type of international Diplomatic status and recognition.

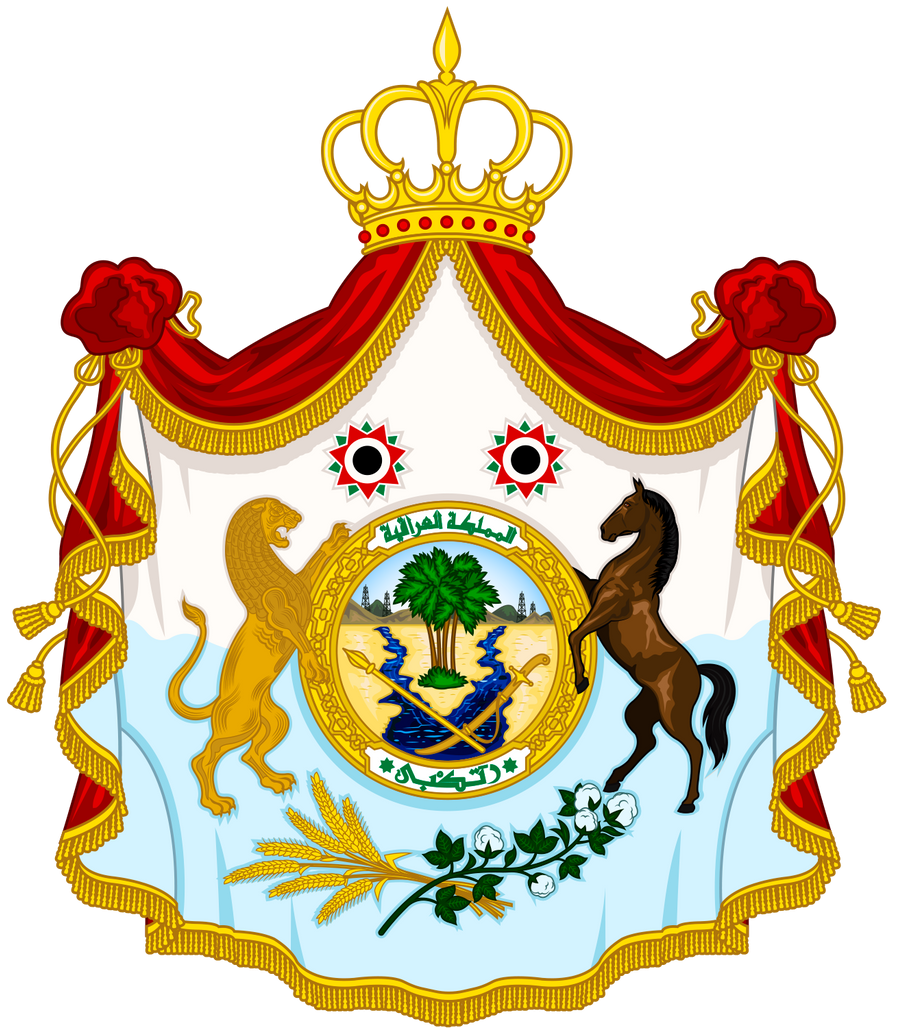
Kingdom of Iraq, Royal Coat of Arms

== Evolution of the holiday ==
Choosing an official national celebration day experienced many changes across different eras of Iraq.

Following the 14 July Revolution which led to the fall of the Kingdom of Iraq and the establishment of the First Republic of Iraq, 14 July was celebrated to mark the birth of the republic and was celebrated as the Iraqi National day, until 1968 when Ba'athist Iraq was established, 17 July became the Iraqi National day.

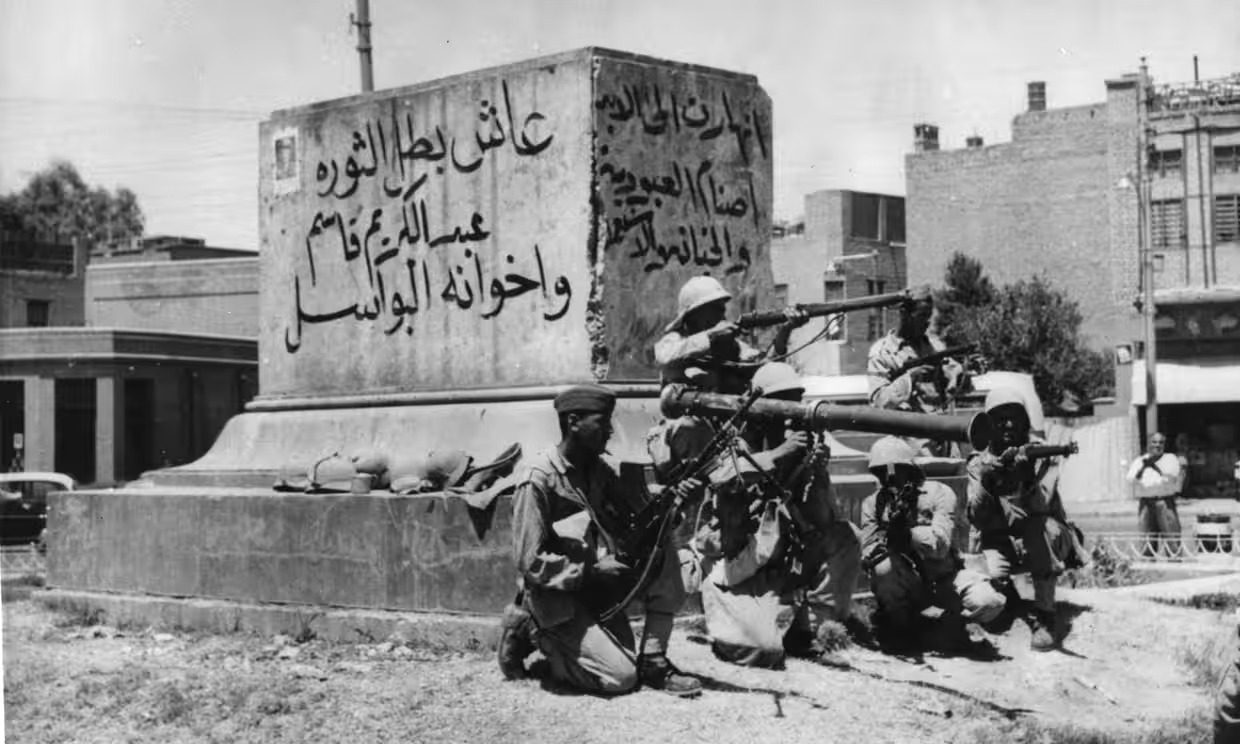
14 July Revolution against the Royal Kingdom of Iraq

Following the Iraq war and the fall of Ba'athist Iraq, 17 July was permanently changed. For about two decades, Iraq lacked a National day, this was due to the constant disagreement among political authorities in Iraq, for a historical date, until 2020.

In August 2020, the Iraqi Government approved the law to make 3 October Iraq's National Day. This date was explicitly chosen as a unifiying, historical date that honours the international recognition of pre-existing Iraqi state rather than celebrating a military coup or a regime change. This date was codified in law under the Official Holidays Law No.12 of 2024.

== Celebration ==
Iraqi National Day is celebrated across the country as an official day for government ministers, public institutions and educational facilities. Rather than functioning purely as an independence festival, it is celebrated as a historical milestone for Iraqi heritage, national identity and cultural continuity. Official diplomatic embassies also recognize the national day and celebrate it annually across Iraqi embassies worldwide to mark Iraq's global presence.
