= Kidnapping of Shelly Kittleson =

2026 kidnapping of an American journalist in Iraq

- Part of the 2026 Iran war
- CCTV footage of the kidnapping
- Date: March 31, 2026
- Location: Baghdad, Iraq
- Type: Political kidnapping, hostage diplomacy
- Cause: 2026 Iran war
- Perpetrator: Kata'ib Hezbollah
- Outcome: Kittleson released on April 7, 2026 in exchange for the release of imprisoned KH members

Shelly Renee Kittleson, an American freelance journalist covering conflict and security issues in the Middle East, was abducted in Baghdad, Iraq on March 31, 2026, while on assignment near the Baghdad Hotel. U.S. and Iraqi officials said she had received warnings of potential threats prior to her abduction. The kidnapping was widely attributed to Kata'ib Hezbollah, an Iranian-backed militia group, which reportedly demanded the release of detained members in exchange for her freedom. Iraqi authorities launched a security operation following the incident, and one suspect was arrested. She was released on April 7, 2026.

== Background ==
Kittleson is originally from Mount Horeb, Wisconsin, (Note: Other media outlets reported that she is from Monticello.) and grew up in Darlington, where she graduated from Darlington High School in 1995. She was born either in 1976 or 1977. (Note: She was 49 years old as of April 1, 2026.) She left Wisconsin at age 19 and moved to Italy, where she attended school and worked as a nanny, spending about a decade there. She later pursued journalism, reporting extensively on conflict, humanitarian issues, and security developments in the Middle East and Central Asia. Since around 2010, she has covered events in Iraq, Syria, and Afghanistan, contributing to outlets including Al-Monitor, BBC, Politico, and Foreign Policy. She has been based in Rome, Italy; prior to her kidnapping, she had entered Iraq on a single-entry visa.

== Kidnapping ==
On March 31, 2026, Kittleson was abducted in Baghdad near the Baghdad Hotel while on assignment. According to officials, she had been warned of potential threats in the days leading up to the incident. Witness accounts, supported by video footage, indicated that armed individuals intercepted Kittleson on a street in Baghdad, approached her after a vehicle pulled up, and forced her into the car following a brief struggle before driving away. Iraqi authorities later located a vehicle believed to have been used in the kidnapping. The incident occurred amid heightened tensions involving Iranian-backed militias operating in Iraq.

== Investigation, response, and reactions ==
Iraqi security forces launched an operation to locate Kittleson shortly after her disappearance. Authorities said the pursuit led to the interception of a vehicle used by the kidnappers, which crashed near al-Haswa, Babylon Governorate as they attempted to flee, and that one suspect was arrested in connection with the kidnapping. Kittleson had already been transferred to a second vehicle that escaped.

Assistant Secretary of State for Global Public Affairs Dylan Johnson stated that the U.S. State Department had "fulfilled [its] duty to warn" her and would continue coordinating with the FBI to secure her release. Press freedom organizations and media groups expressed alarm over the kidnapping. The Committee to Protect Journalists warned that the incident highlighted increasing risks for journalists in Iraq, while the National Press Club described the abduction as "alarming and unacceptable" and called for her immediate release.

Negotiations for her release involved Iraqi officials, intermediaries linked to the Popular Mobilization Forces, and political figures from the Coordination Framework, while the militia tied her release to Iraqi Prime Minister Mohammed Shia al-Sudani and announced it through a senior security official.

== Release ==
Kittleson was released on April 7, 2026, after a week in captivity, under the condition that she leave Iraq immediately. Her release followed an agreement in which Kata'ib Hezbollah secured the release of several of its detained members from the Iraqi government. According to a security commander in the group, "We are in a state of war resembling that imposed by the American enemy against Islam, and in such situations many considerations are set aside." Iraqi intelligence sources said that, following the release of the detainees, the group transferred Kittleson through security channels to the Green Zone and handed her over to the U.S. Embassy in Baghdad.

U.S. Secretary of State Marco Rubio confirmed her release, stating that the United States was relieved and was working to support her safe departure from Iraq, while thanking Iraqi authorities and U.S. agencies for their role in securing it.

== Aftermath ==
A video circulated on social media appeared to show Kittleson standing against a plain background and speaking in English in what was widely interpreted as a scripted statement or one made under duress, though its authenticity, timing, and location could not be independently verified.

In an article published in The Atlantic, Kittleson later stated that she had been coerced into recording the video statement while in captivity, describing it as part of a scripted "confession" prepared by her captors under threat. She wrote that she was instructed to repeat specific allegations on camera and complied due to fears of prolonged detention or violence.

Following her release, Iraqi authorities arrested a member of Kata'ib Hezbollah in connection with her kidnapping. On 31 August 2026, an Iraqi criminal court sentenced Amir Rahim Jabbar, identified as a member of the group, to 15 years in prison under Iraq's anti-terrorism law for the kidnapping of Kittleson. A judicial source verified the authenticity of the court document, while a Kata'ib Hezbollah source confirmed the ruling. Kittleson, who shared a copy of the ruling on X, said she was "grateful to the Iraqi judiciary".

== See also ==
- Elizabeth Tsurkov
- Foreign hostages in Iraq
- Iraq in the 2026 Iran war
