= 2007 West Azerbaijan clashes =

2007 West Azerbaijan offensive
- Part of Iran–PJAK conflict
Date	22 February – 1 March 2006
Location	Iraqi Kurdistan, north-western Iran
Result	Indecisive

Belligerents
Iran	Kurdistan Free Life Party (PJAK)

Casualties and losses
8–20 IRGC killed in helicopter crash 17 Soldiers killed (February 25 – March 1)	17 PJAK forces killed (February 22 – 24); 47 PJAK killed (February 25 – March 1)
- Total: 89–101 killed

2007 West Azerbaijan clashes were a series of armed clashes between Iranian security forces and the Kurdish insurgent group PJAK in Iran's West Azerbaijan province. It started with a series of clashes between Iran and the PKK, leading to the death of 17 PKK militants between February 22 and February 24 by Iranian forces. This was followed by an Iranian helicopter crash in Khoy, an incident which was claimed to be performed by PJAK, though denied by Iranians as technical malfunction. The Iranian military launched an offensive the next day which resulted in the death of 47 insurgents and 17 security forces and lasted until March 1.

== Background ==
The Iran–PJAK conflict is an armed conflict between the Islamic Republic of Iran and Kurdish rebels of the Kurdistan Free Life Party (PJAK), which began in 2004. The group has carried out numerous attacks in the Kurdistan Province of Iran and provinces of Western Iran. PJAK is closely affiliated with the militant Kurdistan Workers' Party (PKK), the primary opponent of the Republic of Turkey in the Kurdish–Turkish conflict. PJAK has been designated as a terrorist organization by Iran, Japan, Turkey, and the United States.

Following massive clashes in summer 2011, a cease-fire was declared between the parties, with Iran claiming victory and PJAK allegedly ending all armed operations as of 29 September 2011. Since then, several violent incidents have occurred, including the December 2011 Baneh clash and another clash in April 2012. In 2013, the confrontations became more frequent, including clashes in May, the August 2013 Sardasht clash and more events in October. The heavy 2016 West Iran clashes took place on 19 April.

As with the PKK, PJAK leaders say their long-term goals are to establish an autonomous Kurdish region within the Iranian state. It is mainly focused on replacing Iran's current form of government with a democratic and federal government.

== Offensive ==
During February 22–24, the IRGC forces have been clashing with Turkey's outlawed Kurdistan Workers' Party (PKK), in which at least 17 PKK members were killed in West Azerbaijan province.

On February 24, 2007, an Iranian helicopter crashed near the town of Khoy, killing 8 IRGC soldiers, including several members of the Revolutionary Guards, one of them being Said Qahari, the head of the Iranian army's 3rd Corps. PJAK quickly claimed to have shot down the helicopter using a shoulder-launched missile, killing 20 soldiers, including several senior officers, during an hour-long battle. Iran, however, blamed the crash on bad weather.

On February 25, 2007, Iran launched a counter-offensive against the PJAK group in the northeast of Iran's West Azerbaijan province, near the Turkish border. According to Iran's state news agencies, as many as 47 Kurdish rebels and 17 Iranian soldiers were killed in the violence between February 25 and March 1, 2007.

== Aftermath ==
In August 2007, PJAK claimed it managed to down another Iranian military helicopter that was conducting a forward operation of bombardment by Iranian forces. In this crash 5 IRGC soldiers were injured. Iran claimed the crash was resulted due to bad weather in the region.

== See also ==
- Iranian Kurdistan
