= 2011 Iran–Iraq cross-border raids =

IRGC series of operations against the PJAK

- Part of the Iran–PJAK conflict
Date	July 11, 2011 – September 29, 2011
Location	Iraqi Kurdistan, Sardasht County, Iran
Result	Iranian victory: PJAK activities decreased in the border areas.; PJAK operational commander Majid Kavian killed.; Kurdistan Regional Government and Iraqi Central Government agree to take measures against PJAK to keep border regions peaceful.; PJAK agrees to end armed operations.

Belligerents
Iran: Iranian Armed Forces	PJAK

Commanders and leaders
(Iran) Ataollah Salehi (Iran) Mohammad Ali Jafari (Iran) Ali Fazli (Iran) Abbas Ali Jannesari † (Iran) Mohammad Taqi Osanlou (Iran) Hossein Zolfaqari (Iran) Abbas Asemi † (Iran) Abdollah Araqi (Iran) Nasser Shabani (Iran) Ahmad Reza Pourdastan (Iran) Mehdi Mahdavinejad	Majid Kavian †; Murat Karasac †; Ruzhat Butan † Shirzad Kamangar

Strength
5,000	600

Casualties and losses
20 killed (Iranian claim); 320 killed (PJAK claim)	180 killed, 300 wounded (Iranian claim); 16 killed (by mid August) (PJAK claim)
- 230 families displaced (by August 3); 10 civilians killed Total: 210–326+ killed

2011 Iran–Iraq cross-border raids were a series of operations, performed by Iran's Islamic Revolutionary Guard Corps (IRGC), against the Kurdistan Free Life Party (PJAK), a Kurdish rebel group. The operations began in July 2011, and included attacks on PJAK bases in Iranian territory, penetration into Iraqi Kurdistan territory, bombing of PJAK associated bases and villages in Kurdish controlled Iraqi areas and direct targeting of Kurdish guerrilla command in Qandil mountains. The clashes resulted in dozens killed and wounded on both sides, with hundreds of displaced Kurdish villagers. The exact numbers of casualties on each side are a matter of controversy.

On September 29, PJAK accepted Iranian terms and withdrew fully from Iran's soil in what Iranian commanders described as a surrender. According to the IRGC they killed over 180 PJAK fighters and injured over 300 during the operations. The operation cost Iran $150 million. The cease-fire was violated by the sides in December 2011, in Baneh.

== Chronology ==
=== July offensive ===
Iran started its offensive against the PJAK on July 11, after an escalation of PJAK activity in North-Western Iran and began shelling PJAK positions in Northern Iraq on July 16. On July 17, the IRGC killed at least five PJAK members in a raid that destroyed one of the group's headquarters in north-western Iran. PJAK claimed 21 Iranian soldiers were killed in the clashes. Iranian authorities on the other hand confirmed their casualties at 1 killed and 3 injured, while claiming to have inflicted "heavy losses" on the rebels. They announced that they had captured three rebel bases, one of which was identified as Marvan and was said to be the leading PJAK camp in the region.

On July 20, PJAK killed 5 IRGC members and one IRGC commander. IRGC forces killed 35 PJAK fighters and captured several others during clashes on July 25. By July 26, more than 50 PJAK fighters and 8 Revolutionary Guards were reported to have been killed while over 800 people had been displaced by the fighting according to the International Committee of the Red Cross. At least 3 civilians were killed. During clashes in the Jasosan and Alotan heights the next day, Iranian forces claimed to have killed over 21 PJAK fighters, confirming that two IRGC forces had been killed and two had been injured during the clashes.

On August 1, at request of the Kurdistan Regional Government, Iran halted its offensive and gave PJAK forces a one-month grace period during the Muslim holy month of Ramadan to retreat all their forces from Iranian territory.

=== Sabotage of the Tabriz–Ankara pipeline ===
On July 29, suspected PJAK militants blew up the Tabriz–Ankara pipeline, which was repaired the next day. On August 1, Iranian forces killed 3 and arrested 4 of the militants said to be responsible for the attack in West Azerbaijan. At least one of them was a Turkish citizen. The Turkish citizen was later confirmed to be Murat Karasac alias "Cemil", who was reported to be the leader of the group that carried out the attack and was one of the 3 killed in the fighting. It was later reported in Turkish media that he was the PJAK's number 2 in command.

=== Cease-fire attempts ===
On August 8, 2011, Abdul Rahman Haji Ahmadi, the leader of the Kurdistan Free Life Party, said the armed rebel group is prepared to negotiate with Iran and maintained that Kurdish issues need to be solved through “peaceful means”. In an exclusive interview with Rudaw, Haji Ahmadi acknowledged that in some cases compromise is inevitable and indicated that PJAK is willing to lay down its arms. He said fighting may not help Kurds secure political and cultural rights in Iran.

On August 8, 2011, Murat Karayılan, the leader of the Kurdistan Workers' Party (PKK) said they withdrew all PJAK fighters out of Iran and sent them to PKK camps in the Qandil mountains. He said they replaced PJAK forces on the Iranian border with PKK forces to prevent further clashes and called on Iran to end attacks because unlike the PJAK, the PKK was not at war with Iran. Karayılan released the following statement:

As the PKK, we have not declared any war against Iran. We do not wish to fight against the Islamic Republic of Iran either. Why? Because one of the aims of the international forces who seek to re-design the region is to besiege Iran. Currently, they are more preoccupied with Syria. If they just manage to work things out there as they wish, it will be Iran's turn next. As Kurds, we do not think it quite right to be involved in a war with Iran at such a stage. You have no interest in targeting the PKK ... You must end this conflict. It is America that wants this conflict to go on. Because these attacks of yours serve America's interests. They want both the PKK and Iran to grow weaker.

=== Alleged Capture of Murat Karayılan ===
On August 16, Alaeddin Boroujerdi head of the Iranian parliament's foreign affairs committee told Mehr News Agency that the PKK's top commander Murat Karayılan had been captured during the IRGC operation, a claim which was dismissed by the PKK, which told Roj TV that Karayılan was fine and free. Later, however, Iranian foreign minister Ali Akbar Salehi and Turkish foreign minister Ahmet Davutoğlu also denied the news. Turkish interior minister İdris Naim Şahin said the news confused Murat Karayılan with PJAK commander Murat Karasac, who had been killed by Iranian forces in West Azerbaijan on August 2.

Nonetheless, this has led to many conspiracy theories in the media, for instance by Today's Zaman columnist Markar Esayan, that Iran was trying to help Cemil Bayik execute an internal coup in the PKK by capturing Karayılan, so that Iran can gain influence over the organisation. Emre Uslu, another columnist for the Today's Zaman claimed that Iran had captured Karayılan to gain a political victory in the conflict over PJAK, by getting the PKK to stop supporting them. Pro-PKK think-tank Yusuf Ziyad believed that this was the beginning of the forming of a Shi'a-Kurdish alliance, by Iran. Ziyad and Hürriyet columnist Kadri Gürsel both believe that this is motivated by Turkish opposition towards the Ba'ath regime of Bashar al-Assad in Syria. Yeni Şafak daily columnist Abdulkadir Selvi claimed that Iran had, in fact, taken Karayılan out of Qandil and brought him to Urumiyeh to keep him safe from Turkish air raids. Professor Sedat Laçiner, President of the Çanakkale university claimed Iran had released Karayılan and this is proof that they are supporting the PKK. The NATO missile shield in Turkey is also cited as reason for why Iran would want to support the PKK.

A later report on Today's Zaman said that Murat Karayılan may have actually been injured in the Iranian operation rather than captured.

=== September offensive ===
On September 2, Iran renewed its military offensive against PJAK fighters in Northern Iraq in August after the expiring of the Ramadan cease-fire, just days after Turkish officials claimed that their August air strikes against the PKK had killed up to 160 militants in Iraqi Kurdistan. Iranian sources claimed that the rebels had used the truce to dig tunnels in the Jasosan heights close to Iran's border. On September 4, Iran claimed the offensive had killed and injured 30 PJAK fighters and on September 5, 2011, the IRGC rejected a cease-fire declared by the PJAK as meaningless, as long as PJAK forces remained inside the borders of the Islamic Republic. Iran also said its troops had killed 30 PJAK fighters and wounded 40 during the several days of fighting.

On September 7, the Iranian Revolutionary Guards claimed PJAK's deputy commander Majid Kavian alias "Semko Sarholdan" was killed while commanding an operation in Kutaman. Kavian, the PJAK's number 2 man was said to be the group's chief operational commander, as the group's number 1 leader, Haji Ahmadi lives in Germany. PJAK confirmed Kavian's death in a statement on their website. On September 9, Iran claimed to have captured 2 more PJAK commanders.

On September 21, the IRGC claimed they had successfully forced the armed PJAK fighters from Iranian territory.

=== End of Operation ===
On September 29, 2011, Iranian sources reported that PJAK officially surrendered with 180 deaths and 300 injured, accepting Iranian demands of retreating one mile from the Iranian border and ceasing armed operations. Iranian ambassador to Iraq Hassan Danaei-Far declared that they had cleared all areas of PJAK activities and that they had reached an agreement with the Iraqi central government and the Kurdistan Regional Government, in which they vowed to keep the border peaceful.

In October 2011, President of Iraqi Kurdistan Massoud Barzani stated that the border between Iran and Iraqi Kurdistan would from now on be safe, after an agreement with PJAK. It was however clear that PJAK withdrawal was made for redeployment purposes along the Iran-Iraq border. The cease-fire collapsed on late December 2011, when a clash in Baneh between IRGC resulted in mortal casualties.

== Casualties ==
On August 5, the leader of Kurdistan Free Life Party, Rahman Haj Ahmedi, said to Newsmax that more than 300 Iranian Revolutionary Guards had been killed in a series of ambushes, while acknowledging 16 losses. Iranian officials however, claimed to have killed over 150 PJAK forces during the operations, confirming the deaths of only 17 Revolutionary Guards. More were killed in the August cross-border offensives, while Iran claimed to have also killed 30 PJAK fighters and wounded 40 in early September.

According to IRGC Brigadier General Abdullah Araqi, 180 PJAK fighters were killed and 300 injured by the end of the operation.

== Responses ==
- Human Rights Watch criticized Iran over its military operation, saying it had evidence its forces have deliberately targeted civilians.
- Iraqi Kurdistan: On Tuesday, September 6, the president of Iraq's Kurdistan region, Massud Barzani, called on Kurdish fighters to relinquish their armed rebellion, and instead seek their goals through diplomacy.
- Iraq: The Government of Iraq and Kurdistan Regional Government eventually agreed with Iran to take measures against PJAK to stabilise the border region.

== See also ==
- Iranian Kurdistan
