= Western Iran clashes (2016–2023) =

Clashes between Kurdish insurgents and the Revolutionary Guards

- Part of Iranian–Kurdish conflict and Iran–PJAK conflict
Date	19 April 2016 – c. August 2023 (7 years, 3 months and 3 weeks)
Location	Iran (Iranian Kurdistan): Kurdistan Province; Southern parts of West Azerbaijan Province; Spillovers in the Kurdistan Region, Iraq
Result	Status quo: Iran and Kurdish parties conduct peace negotiations in 2019.; Iran and Iraq sign a security agreement in August 2023, resulting in the relocation of Kurdish opposition groups in the Kurdistan Region of Iraq.

Belligerents
Iran	CCIKPP; PDKI; HDK (until 2022); Khebat; Komala–PIK; PAK; PJAK; Komala–KTP; Komala–CPI; Anti-government protesters; Alleged support: Saudi Arabia

Commanders and leaders
(Iran) Ali Khamenei (Iran) Ebrahim Raisi (Iran) Hassan Rouhani (Iran) Mohammad Bagheri (Iran) Ataollah Salehi (Iran) Abdolrahim Mousavi (Iran) Ahmad Reza Pourdastan (Iran) Kioumars Heydari (Iran) Hassan Shahsafi (Iran) Aziz Nasirzadeh (Iran) Hamid Vahedi (Iran) Mohammad Ali Jafari (Iran) Hossein Salami (Iran) Mohammad Pakpour (Iran) Hossein Ashtari (Iran) Ahmad-Reza Radan (Iran) Mahmoud Alavi (Iran) Esmaeil Khatib (Iran) Shakiba Salimi †	Mustafa Hijri; Khalid Azizi; Qadir Qadri †; Sabah Rahmani †; Abdullah Mohtadi; Ibrahim Alizade; Omar Ilkhanizade; Abdullah Konaposhi; Hussein Yazdanpanah; Siamand Moini; Zîlan Vejîn

Units involved
Iranian Armed Forces; Islamic Republic of Iran Army; Islamic Revolutionary Guard Corps; Police Command; Border Guard Command; Ministry of Intelligence	HDK Peshmerga; PDKI Peshmerga; Komala Peshmerga; HAK-R; YRK

Strength
Unknown	KDPI: 1,000–1,500; HDK: 500 – 900; Komala: <1,000; PJAK: <3,000; PAK: 100–900

Casualties and losses
Total Iranian Military Casualties (IRGC, Border Guards and Basij etc): 14^{[a]} to 18–26+^{[b]} killed Basiji 2^{[a]}–9^{[b]} killed Border guards: 6 killed^{[a]}	PDKI 20+^{[b]} to 33–40^{[a]} killed Komala 3^{[b]} killed Unidentified 3^{[a]} killed PJAK 12–13^{[b]} to 17^{[a]} killed
- 14 Iranian civilians killed 6 Iraqi Kurdistan civilians wounded 5 Kurdish activists executed Hundreds displaced Total: 75–82^{[a]} to 157–161+^{[b]} armed men killed; and 19 Iranian and Iraqi civilians killed or executed
- ^{a} Iranian claim^{b} Kurdish rebels claim

The Western Iran clashes (2016–2023) were military clashes between Kurdish opposition groups and the Islamic Revolutionary Guard Corps (IRGC) that began in April 2016 and largely subsided in 2023, when Kurdish groups relocated away from the Iran–Iraq border. Initiated by the Democratic Party of Iranian Kurdistan (PDKI), the clashes intensified when the Kurdistan Freedom Party (PAK) and Komalah joined the fight. In parallel, a leftist Iranian Kurdish rebel group, the Kurdistan Free Life Party (PJAK), resumed military activities against Iran in 2016, following a long period of stalemate.

The 2016 clashes came following a background of what the PDKI described as "growing discontent in Rojhelat (Iranian Kurdistan)". A commander of the PAK's military wing described their engagement and declaration of hostilities against the Iranian government were due to the fact that "the situation in eastern Kurdistan had become unbearable, especially with the daily arbitrary executions against the Kurds [in Iran]."

== Background ==
Iran has a significant 8 million strong Kurdish minority, concentrated in the West of the country, many of whom are Sunni. The Kurds spread across the Iranian provinces of West Azerbaijan, Kurdistan, Kermanshah and Ilam. Kurdish separatism is a theme in several Middle Eastern nations, and Kurdish movements have engaged in conflicts also in Syria (Kurds in Syria), Iraq (Kurds in Iraq), and Turkey (Kurds in Turkey) to promote national ambitions.

The PDKI had announced the "restart [of] armed resistance against the Islamic Republic of Iran" on 25 February. The PDKI explained that their return to arms was due to "growing discontent in Rojhelat". According to Al-Monitor analysis, since March 2015, the PDKI has dispatched several teams of its fighters and political cadets into Iranian Kurdistan. The PDKI announced in March 2016 that it was giving up a two-decade ceasefire with the Iranian government and returning its guerrilla fighters to Iran, but vowed not to initiate hostilities unless attacked. In September 2016, PDKI released a statement that their return to militancy was also motivated by Iran's nuclear deal.

Commander of the PAK military wing described their engagement and declaration of hostilities against Iranian government due to the fact that "the situation in eastern Kurdistan (Iranian Kurdistan) has become unbearable, especially with the daily arbitrary executions against the Kurds".

== Timeline ==
=== 2016 ===
On 17 April 2016, PAK's armed Peshmerga units, named Kurdistan Freedom Eagles for East Kurdistan (HAK-R), attacked Iranian government security forces in Sanandaj during annual Army Day Parade of Iran, claiming to have resumed the armed Kurdish national struggle.

On 4 May 2016, the PDKI Peshmerga engaged the Iranian security forces in Sardasht area, killing 8-10 soldiers of the Iranian Revolutionary Guards. Following the clash, the PDKI announced in its Twitter account that "A Peshmerga code of Resistance has been released in Eastern Kurdistan: "Lions Hunt, Hyenas Eat the Dead"". There were reports about the involvement of the Iranian air force in targeting the fighting positions of the rebel group, according to Kurdish sources.

On the following day Hussein Yazdanpana, the commander of the military wing of the Kurdistan Freedom Party (PAK) in Iran, told Asharq Alawsat that their force will soon resume military operations against the Iranian government forces, "Iran is at the doorstep of a wide-scale armed uprising … that will include all off [sic] its cities".

On 20 May 2016, Kurdish groups reported an Iranian military build-up along the Iraqi border, constructing new military forts along its borders with the Kurdistan Region and deploying extra troops to the area. Nine new forts have been built along the border, according to the Kurdish groups.

On 20 May, Authorities of the Islamic Republic of Iran executed five Kurdish rights activists in the northwestern Urmia city. The Kurdish rights activists Naji Kiwan, Ali Kurdian, Haidar Ramini, Nadir Muhamadi and Ruhman Rashidi were arrested several days earlier on charges of "conspiring against the Islamic Republic of Iran".

On 13 June 2016, it was reported that the Iranian Revolutionary Guard Corps ambushed and killed five members of the PJAK in the country's northwest. The statement of Iran also said that the militants whom the IRGC killed, had assassinated two members of Iran's paramilitary Basiji militia in May 2016, in the border-city of Sardasht, along with an engineer who was working for the IRGC on "development projects" in border areas. The clash between IRGC and PJAK came after many months of cessation of hostilities between the sides and without explicit announcement of PJAK concerning the Kurdish militant movements' activity since April 2016.

On 16 June 2016, 6 IRGC security members including their commander were reportedly killed by Kurdish insurgents of the PDKI in Shno area according to statement of Rostam Jahangiri - head of the PDKI political and military commission. Iranian media reported 8 Kurdish insurgents dead in the event. Iranian artillery fire was reported in the area in the aftermath of the clash and Iranian reinforcements were dispatched into the area. In the aftermath of two day clashes in Shno, the PDKI reported 6 of their members killed, claiming to bring down more than 20 IRGC members and wounded 17. Iranian official statement acknowledged 3 Iranian security members and "12 terrorists".

On 25 June, Iran reported killing 5 Kurdish separatists in West Iran, including "two leaders". Following a series of continuous engagements and Iranian shellings on PDKI positions in the area, by 27 June both sides claimed dozens of fatalities, but without reliable figures according to Iranian IRNA agency. The same day it was reported that 5 Iraqi Kurdistan civilians in the Soran district were wounded following Iranian shelling of the area. On 28 June, it was reported by Iranian state agencies that 11 Kurdish rebels of the PDKI along with 3 IRGC soldiers were killed in the vicinity of Iran-Iraq border; it was not clear whether cited death toll of Kurdish rebels included the 5 reported two days earlier. The PDKI said several of its fighters and 20 Iranian soldiers were killed in the incidents.

According to Kurdish human rights activists in Iranian Kurdistan, Iranian security forces killed two civilians, who were working as porters, overnight on 27 June in Alan area of Sardasht city, West Azerbaijan province of Iran, on the border between Iran and Kurdistan Region.

Two militants of the Kurdistan Democratic Party of Iran (PDKI) were killed in clashes with the Iranian Islamic Revolutionary Guards Corp (IRGC) in Sawlawa on 5 July according to PDKI statement. Iranian-government affiliated Fars News Agency also reported the event, claiming the militants were linked with the larger group, 11 of whom were killed a week earlier.

According to Iranian state media, on 10 July, an Iranian MP the representative of the county of Eslamabad-e Gharb escaped an assassination attempt in Western Iran. Iranian sources linked the event to PJAK activity in the area. The assassination attempt was reportedly made by 4 militants, during which the governor of Eslamabad-e Gharb and the director general of the fisheries of Kermanshah and other passengers of the vehicle sustained injuries, while the driver and head of the Veterinary Department of Dalahou county were killed in the shooting. According to Al-Arabiya report, the gunmen could not be identified.

On 10 August 2016, it was reported that heavy shelling was executed by the IRGC, targeting Iraqi Kurdistan borderline villages. The intense shelling area was at the Sidekan district of Erbil, prompting evacuation of four villages. No deaths were reported at the incident. The attack came two days after IRGC commander Mohammad Ali Jafari visited the Kurdistan and Azerbaijan regions of Iran. 18 August 2016 PDKI and Iran clashed in the city of Shno

On 7 September 2016, according to KDP-I statement, at least 2 KDP-I members were killed in an ambush by Iranian border guards near Sardasht. Iranian state media reported of 8 Kurdish insurgent fatalities. Alater report by Tehran Times claimed 10 militants killed.

Reportedly on 16–17 September Iranian security forces arrested 4 Kurdish militants near Marivan. No official statement was issued by Iran in this regard.

On 17 September 2016, according to Iraqi Kurdistan media, Iran shelled Kurdistan Region areas adjacent to the Iranian northeastern border, targeting Barbzinan area in Sidakan in the Soran district of Erbil province. The PDKI claimed that Iranian shellings killed an Iranian Kurdish porter and injured another. Reportedly, 70 Iraqi Kurdish families were displaced as a result of the shelling. According to an anonymous report, 2 Iranian security forces were killed on 18 September in the Barimergan area of Piranshahr. One PDKI Peshmerga member was reported by the party to die of his wounds several days after the shellings and clashes.

On 20 September 2016, Iraqi Kurdish media reported of 2 IRGC killed in West Azerbaijan province.

According to PDKI, on 24 September, their militants launched an offensive on the IRGC "major security center" at Piranshahr, North-West Iran, claiming to kill "more than 30 IRGC members" and wounding "dozens more". According to PDKI's member Sipan Majidi, the attack began with mortar bombardment. The alleged operation was claimed to be a retaliation for Iranian authorities' crackdown on Kurdish activists in western Iran. No announcement was made in regard to this incident by any Iranian authority.

Iranian news agencies reported of arresting 4 members and supporters of the PDKI in Marivan, West Iran.

On 4 October 2016, Iranian Tasnim news agency reported of an incident in Kurdish-majority area in West Iran, in which 12 militants were killed and 3 IRGC members wounded. PJAK later confirmed the report on armed incident, in which it said several members of the East Kurdistan Defense Forces of PJAK were killed near the Salasbajani town in Kermanshah. On 11 October, PJAK confirmed 12 fatalities from their ranks and published their pictures.

On 13 October 2016, PJAK claimed of three cross-border attacks against Iranian security forces and "affiliated mercenaries", allegedly killing 26-32 Iranian personnel and losing 1 militant. The attacks were claimed to be a revenge for the IRGC ambush on 4 October, where 12 PJAK members were killed. The IRGC commander in Kurdistan province confirmed the outpost had been attacked but said the attackers had failed in their mission. He did not mention any casualties and said YRK members had fled the area. The other attacks have not been confirmed by the IRGC, nor have they been reported on in the Iranian press.

On 15 October 2016, PDKI claimed to have killed 8 Iranian security forces in clashes on the previous day in Northwestern Iran.

In December a double bombing took place in Koya in Iraqi Kurdistan, targeting the offices of the KDP-I politburo and resulting in seven killed. The incident was described by Iraqi Kurdistan as an "act of terror", while KDP-I blamed Iranian authorities for the bombings.

=== 2017 ===
On 19 March, it was reported that 2 IRGC soldiers were killed by the Zagros Eagles militant group, while another attack in Meriwan caused severe injuries to another IRGC member. The PDKI confirmed the clashes, but claimed that Zagros Eagles are an independent organization.

On 21 March 2017, six Kurdish Iranian opposition armed groups, considered illegal by the Iranian government, convened to coordinate their military actions. Those included Komalah, PDKI, KDP Iran branch and three more organizations.

In May 2017, Komalah party moved from support to mobilization of its troops along the Iranian Kurdistan border, aiming to resume armed struggle against the Islamic Republic.

On 23 May, a clash near Turkish–Iranian border between PKK and Iranian security forces produced 3 casualties to PKK according to their own statement. According to Fars News Agency on 28 May, Iranian border guards commander Qassem Rezayee said that Iranians "consider Turkey responsible, and the country should account for this act." Turkish media accused the PJAK in that attack (stating it is as offshoot of PKK), claiming the rebels killed 2 Iranian guards and wounded 7.

In late June 2017, clashes between Iranian security forces and Komala party militants resulted in the death of 3 Komalah Peshmerga. In early July 2017, subsequent Iranian bombardments on Komala positions resulted in 2 Komala militants and 1 Iraqi Kurdistani civilian wounded, in line with depopulation of three Kurdish villages in Iraqi Kurdistan.

In July 2017, Iran reported of border clash in which IRGC forces killed three "terrorists", wounded four others and detained one in a clash, while a Guard member was killed and another wounded in the evening of 20 July clash.

In early September 2017, large protests erupted in Kurdish cities in West Iran following the killing of two Kurdish men by Iranian security forces at the border. These protests were met with tear gas and gunfire, with hundreds arrested. Following the September 2017 Iraqi Kurdistan Independence Referendum, hundreds of thousands of Iranian Kurds gathered throughout the Kurdish cities of Iran to celebrate the event in support of the event. The crackdown by Iranian security was however prompt, with anti-riot forces and tanks being sent into Kurdish cities and over 700 civilians detained.

On 3 November, eight Iranian border guards and a "large number of terrorists" were killed in a clash between Iranian security and PJAK militants according to Iranian sources. Later Iranian report indicated that among the killed Iranians - 5 were border guards and 3 were civil employees.

According to the Iranian semi-official Fars News agency, Iranian Foreign Ministry spokesman Bahram Qassemi said on Monday (4 December 2017) that an Iranian border guard was killed and four others were injured in Maku, Iran, near the border with Turkey. Turkey claimed the attack was conducted by forces from the Kurdistan Workers' Party (PKK). Daily Sabah also blamed the Kurdistan Free Life Party (PJAK), the Iranian wing of the PKK. "The survivors sought help from the Turkish side and the injured were airlifted to hospitals here," reported Daily Sabah. "A soldier succumbed to his wounds at the hospital." The Turkish media agency reported the injured included "engineers working on an irrigation project" and "soldiers were providing security."

In early December 2017, 3 Kurdish smugglers were reported killed by Iranian security in Urmia Province according to Kurdish Hawar News, while another Kurdish smuggler was wounded in another incident in the Kaiman Bahurman village; In Zanjan province a Kurdish trader from Suqis was "seriously wounded," according to Hawar News.

=== 2018 ===
In early January 2018, the IRGC announced that three of its members had been killed in an insurgent attack, while the PDKI claimed that its Peshmerga forces had killed six IRGC personnel during a clash in western Iran. In early March, two PDKI commanders were assassinated in the Kurdistan Region of Iraq, with pro-PDKI sources accusing the Iranian Ministry of Intelligence of being responsible for the attacks.

In July, PJAK militants blew up an ammunition depot and killed 11 Basij members stationed at a border outpost in Marivan County. The IRGC claimed that several PJAK militants had also been killed in the fighting.

On 12 August, it was reported that 20 people were killed in heavy clashes between the IRGC and the PDKI. The IRGC reportedly claimed to have killed 10 Kurdish militants, without specifying its own casualties. The PDKI, meanwhile, claimed that its armed fighters had killed 12 IRGC personnel, while also not disclosing its own casualties.

On 7 September, the IRGC claimed killing six Kurdish militants at the vicinity of the Iraqi border, allegedly belonging to an organization responsible for attacks in July.

On 8 September, the IRGC performed a missile attack on Kurdish party headquarters of PDKI and KDP-I in the Kurdistan Region of Iraq, killing at least 11 people, wounding 50 more. The weapons used were reportedly Fateh-110 missiles. The Iraqi Foreign Ministry issued a statement criticizing Iran's attack, as harming Iraq's sovereignty.

=== 2019 ===
On 17 March 2019, one Iranian border guard was killed in clashes near the border with the Kurdistan Region of Iraq. Another such incident happened on 15 March 2019 as well, but no casualties from this incident have been reported. It is not yet confirmed whether the perpetrators were Kurdish groups.

On 2 May 2019, the PAK accused the Iraqi government of arresting one of its former fighters and handing him over to Iranian authorities.

==== Oslo Negotiations ====
Between 27 and 28 June 2019, representatives of four member parties of the Cooperation Centre of Iranian Kurdistan's Political Parties (CCIKPP) and an Iranian government delegation led by Mohammad Kazem Sajjadpour met in Oslo, Norway, to discuss a peaceful resolution to the conflict. The talks were mediated by the Norwegian Centre for Conflict Resolution (NOREF). They followed increasing pressure from the Kurdistan Regional Government and the political crisis surrounding the United States' withdrawal from the Iran nuclear deal, amid Iranian concerns that the United States could use Kurdish militant groups to exert pressure on Iran. The meeting was the first of its kind since the assassination of Kurdish leader Abdul Rahman Ghassemlou during negotiations in Vienna in 1989, after which Kurdish parties had been reluctant to engage in talks with the Iranian government. Although the negotiations did not result in a concrete agreement, they were described as strengthening the position of the Iranian Kurdish parties by demonstrating that Iran was willing to negotiate with them, despite its longstanding claims that the insurgency had been defeated.

Despite the negotiations, clashes between the IRGC and Kurdish groups continued in western Iran, while Iranian shelling of border areas at times intensified, resulting in deaths among Iraqi Kurdish civilians.

In early July, Iran announced the killing of five Kurdish militants in the border regions with Iraq, while losing one IRGC member. The incident came as a retaliation for the killing of three IRGC members in Piranshahr on July 9, 2019.

On 12 July 2019, the PAK announced that they had captured an alleged Iranian agent.

=== 2020 ===
On 5 May 2020, an IRGC commander was killed along with two other IRGC soldiers in Kurdistan Province by "anti-revolutionary elements."

On 29 May 2020, three Iranian border guards were killed in clashes with "bandits" during a patrol near Sardasht, West Azerbaijan Province.

On 16 June 2020, the Iranian military began shelling Kurdish militants in the Kurdistan Region of Iraq, joining Turkey's Operations Claw-Eagle and Claw-Tiger.

On 23 June 2020, clashes between Iranian security forces and Kurdish militant groups in the village of Kuran, near Urmia, West Azerbaijan Province, left three IRGC soldiers dead.

On the night of November 13, 2020, three Iranian border guards were killed and two more were wounded after engaging in a firefight with suspected Kurdish militants around the village of Tergever, West Azerbaijan Province.

=== 2021 ===
On 22 April 2021, unknown gunmen killed two IRGC members.

=== 2022 ===
The IRGC fired artillery at headquarters of "Anti-Iranian terrorists" in Iraqi Kurdistan on September 24, 2022. Iran blamed Kurdish dissidents for involvement in the Mahsa Amini protests, and in a televised statement, they stated that the operations "will continue in order to ensure viable border security, punish criminal terrorists and hold officials [of the Kurdish Regional Government] accountable towards international regulations and their legal duties".

=== 2023 ===
On 12 and 13 June, clashes between PJAK and the IRGC resulted in the death of one IRGC member. The fighting reportedly began in response to growing Iranian military deployments along the Iran–Iraq border.

==== Iran Iraq Security Treaty ====
In March 2023, a border security agreement was signed between Iran and Iraq, and in August a separate agreement was reached envisioning the relocation and disarmament of Kurdish groups near the border. Iraqi authorities stated that they had implemented all provisions of the deal, however, according to The New Arab, reports that Kurdish forces had been disarmed were inaccurate. Kurdish groups did relocate to camps several kilometers away from the border at the request of the Kurdistan Regional Government (KRG) and halted cross-border attacks. One Kurdish official stated that "out of respect for the Kurdish authorities in Iraq and to protect their interests, we agreed to stop all our actions against the Iranian regime."

== Belligerents ==
The Democratic Party of Iranian Kurdistan (KDPI) and Kurdistan Freedom Party (PAK) were the first to initiate insurgency in the first half of 2016. In October 2016, the Kurdistan Free Life Party (PJAK) separately announced to resume its militant activities, which had largely been postponed since its 2011 unilateral cease fire. On 23 October 2016, the leader of Komala Party of Iranian Kurdistan Abdullah Mohtadi called on the movements of Iranian Kurdistan to form a joint front, as to "merge their separate enclaves is necessary in order to face their common enemy—Iran". Komalah (CPI) officially announced initiation of militant activity in June 2017. In January 2018, the aforementioned parties, including Khabat, formed the Cooperation Centre of Iranian Kurdistan's Political Parties (CCIKPP) to jointly advance Kurdish interests. Due to strategic disputes, Khabat and the CPI later withdrew from the CCIKPP.

On behalf of the Islamic Republic of Iran, the security forces involved in fighting included the Islamic Revolutionary Guard Corps (IRGC), the Basij and the Border Guard Command.

== Foreign involvement ==
During the Iran–Saudi Arabia proxy conflict, Iranian authorities blamed Saudi intelligence agency for supporting the unrest. However, Saudi officials deny involvement. According to a 2016 Stratfor analysis, PAK and KDPI appealed directly to Saudi Arabia in their calls for funding. Stratfor predicted that "countries with a vested interest in exacerbating Iran's domestic problems—such as Saudi Arabia [might] agree to help the Kurds". Saudi Arabia might have provided financial support to all three Kurdish insurgent groups through its Kurdistan Region consulate according to Stratfor.

== Later developments ==
In early June 2026 new clashes broke out inside western Iran between Kurdish opposition groups and the IRGC.

== See also ==
- Western Iran clashes (2026–present)
- Sistan and Baluchestan insurgency
- Third PKK insurgency in Turkey
- Rojava conflict of the Syrian Civil War
- Iraqi Civil War
