= Majid Kavian =

Kurdish politician and military

- Born: 1982; Baneh, Iran
- Died: 3 September 2011 (aged 28–29); Kutaman, Iran
- Military career
- Allegiance: PJAK (2003–2011); PKK (1999–2003)
- Service years: 1999–2011
- Nickname: Simko Sarholdan
- Commands: Operational Chief of PJAK
- Conflicts: Kurdish–Turkish conflict Iran–PJAK conflict: 2011 cross-border raid (KIA)

Majid Kavian (Persian: مجید کاویان; 1982 – 3 September 2011), also known as Simko Sarheldan, was the deputy commander of the militant Kurdistan Free Life Party (PJAK) until his death on 3 September 2011, at the age of 29. As the number two in command he was the chief commander of all PJAK's armed activities as the PJAK's number one leader, Abdul Rahman Haji Ahmadi lives in exile, in Germany.

Majid Kavian was born in the town of Baneh in the Kurdistan Province of Iran in 1982. He joined the Kurdistan Workers' Party (PKK) in its conflict with Turkey in 1999, during which he fought in the Tunceli and Black Sea regions. He joined the PJAK in 2003, where he rose to position of Deputy Commander due to his experience, fighting in Turkey. He was killed by IRGC forces during the 2011 Iran-Iraq cross-border raids, while leading an operation in Kutaman.

The PJAK confirmed his death on their website, releasing the following statement:

September 3rd 2011, during the second stage of Iranian Revolutionary Guards attack against Kandil mountains Majid Kawian, known as Comrade Samkou, deputy commander general of the forces of eastern Kurdistan in the Kurdistan Free Life Party, was killed along with Comrade Ruzhat Butan after being hit by a mortar in heavy Iranian shelling in Kutaman region
