= April 2006 Iran–Iraq cross-border raids =

April 2006 Iran-Iraq cross-border raids
- Part of Iran–PJAK conflict
Date	3 April 2006
Location	Iraqi Kurdistan, north-western Iran
Result	Indecisive

Belligerents
Iran	Kurdistan Free Life Party (PJAK)

Casualties and losses
24 killed (PJAK claim)	

April 2006 Iran–Iraq cross-border raids were three military cross-border attacks on Iran-Iraqi Kurdistan border, in which PJAK claimed to have killed 24 members of Iranian security forces in early April, 2006. The raids were motivated as retaliation for the killing of 10 Kurds demonstrating in Maku by Iranian security forces. On April 10, 2006, seven PJAK members were arrested in Iran, on a suspicion that they had killed three Iranian security force personnel.

== Aftermath ==
PJAK set off a bomb on 8 May 2006 in Kermanshah, wounding five people at a government building.

Since, the US news channel MSNBC claimed that the Iranian military begun bombardments of Kurdish villages in US-occupied Iraq along the Iranian border while claiming that their primary targets were PJAK militants. A number of civilians died.

== See also ==
- Iranian Kurdistan
