= Ravansar and Sanandaj police station attacks =

2009 terrorist incident in Iran

- Part of Iran–PJAK conflict
Date	24–25 April 2009
Location	Kordestan Province, Kermanshah Province,

Belligerents
Iran	Kurdistan Free Life Party (PJAK)

Casualties and losses
18–24 policemen killed	8–10+ PJAK militants killed
- Total: 20–26+ killed

Ravansar and Sanandaj police station attacks were staged by PJAK militants on April 24 and 25, 2009, targeting Iranian police stations in Ravansar, Kermanshah province and Sanandaj, Kordestan province. The attacks, considered among the most costly for Iranian security forces, resulted in 20 to 26 killed, including at least 10 police officers.

== Attacks ==
On April 24, 2009, PJAK rebels attacked a police station in Kermanshah province. According to updated reports 18 policemen and 8 rebels were killed in a fierce gun battle. According to Iranian government sources, the attack resulted in 10 policemen and 10 rebels killed. According to Heidelberg Institute for International Conflict Research, the attack, which occurred on April 24 and 25, involved PJAK attacks on two police stations in the cities of Ravansar in northern Kermanshah province and in Sanandaj, the capital of Kordestan province, killing eleven police officers, with more than ten PJAK members reportedly killed.

== Aftermath ==
Iran responded a week later by attacking Kurdish villages in the border area of Panjwin inside Iraq using helicopter gunships. According to Iraqi border guards officials, the area attacked by Iran was not considered a stronghold of PJAK, that appeared to have been the target of the raid. According to the ICRC, more than 800 Iraqi Kurds have been forced from their homes by the recent cross-border violence.

== See also ==
- Iranian Kurdistan
