= August 2013 Sardasht clash =

Sardasht clash
- Part of the Iran–PJAK conflict
Date	August 22, 2013
Location	Sardasht, West Azerbaijan border area, North-Western Iran

Belligerents
Iran: Islamic Republic of Iran Army Ground Forces; Basij	Kurdistan Free Life Party (PJAK)

Strength
Unknown	Unknown

Casualties and losses
7 killed (PJAK claim)	2 killed (PJAK claim)
- Total: 9 killed

The August 2013 Sardasht clash was a military confrontation on August 22 between Iranian security forces belonging to the Basij, the paramilitary branch of the Islamic Revolutionary Guard Corps (IRGC) and Kurdistan Free Life Party (PJAK) militants. The event is a part of the Iran-PJAK conflict, lasting from 2004, and despite the cease-fire of September 2011, producing more violence. Since the cease-fire in September 2011, when Iran declared to have destroyed the PJAK (claiming the "PJAK issue is over"), several more armed confrontations followed including December 2011 clash in Baneh, April 2012 battle, May 2013 clashes and this most recent Sardasht incident.

Iranian sources didn't specifically report of the August 22 event, however on August 26, a statement was issued by IRGC representative on Fars News that "Twelve terrorist groups have been neutralized in Iran from March 20, 2013 until today...". He also added that IRGC closely supervises the movements of PJAK groups, adding that Iran's western regions are secured.

== See also ==
- Iranian Kurdistan
- West Azerbaijan
