= Iran–PJAK conflict =

Armed conflict between the Islamic Republic of Iran and Kurdish rebels

- Part of Kurdish separatism in Iran
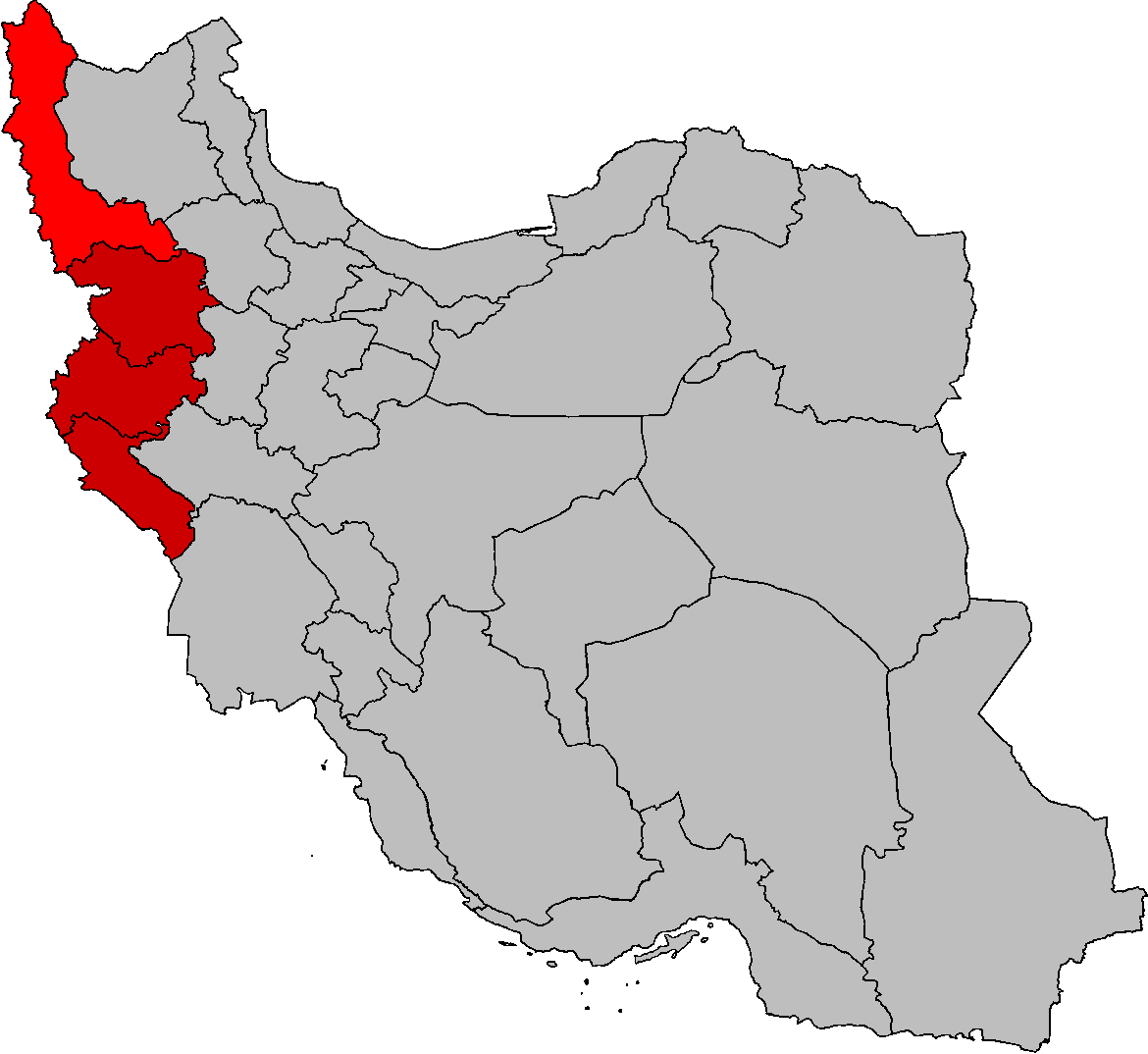
- Kurdish areas in Iran where the PJAK insurrection is concentrated
Date	April 1, 2004 – present (22 years, 7 months, 2 weeks and 4 days)
Location	West-Azerbaijan, Kurdistan and Kermanshah Provinces in Iran, Kurdistan Region in Iraq and Ağrı Province in Turkey
Status	Ongoing; First ceasefire established in September 2011, as Iran's government claimed victory, while PJAK allegedly withdrew from Iranian territory.; PJAK redeploy their positions across the Iran–Iraq border.; Sporadic clashes take place in 2013–2015; A wider conflict erupts in 2016 and 2026

Belligerents
Iran	CPFIK (since 2026); Kurdistan Free Life Party (PJAK); Eastern Kurdistan Units (YRK); Women's Defence Forces (HPJ)

Commanders and leaders
Ali Khamenei (since 2004); Mohammad-Reza Gharaei Ashtiani (since 2021); Ahmad Vahidi (since 2009); Abdolrahim Mousavi (since 2017); Ahmad-Reza Radan (since 2023); Former: Qasem Soleimani (2011-2020); Ali Shamkhani (2004–2005); Mostafa Mohammad-Najjar (2005–2013); Hossein Dehghan (2013–2017); Amir Hatami (2017–2021); Abdolvahed Mousavi Lari (2004–2005); Mostafa Pourmohammadi (2005–19 May 2008); Seyyed Mehdi Hashemi (15 May 2008–5 August 2008); Ali Kordan (12 August 2008–4 November 2008); Kamran Daneshjoo (4 November 2008–24 December 2008); Sadegh Mahsouli (24 December 2008–2009); Hassan Firouzabadi (2004–2016); Abdolreza Rahmani Fazli (2017–2021); Mohammad Salimi (2004–2005); Ataollah Salehi (2005–2017); Yahya Rahim Safavi (2004–2007); Mohammad Bagher Zolghadr (2007-2012); Mohammad Ali Jafari (2007–2019); Hossein Salami (2019–2025); Mohammad Bagher Ghalibaf (2004–2005); Ali Abdollahi (2005); Esmail Ahmadi-Moghaddam (2005–2015); Hossein Ashtari (2015–2023); Mohammad Bagheri (2016–2025)	Haji Ahmadi (2004–11); Majid Kavian †; Murat Karasaç †; Agiri Rojhilat; Zanar Agri; Ihsan Warya; Akif Zagros; Gulistan Dugan; Resit Ehkendi (POW)

Strength
15,000 (per PJAK)	600–1,000 fighters; 2,000–3,000 fighters (per PJAK)

Casualties and losses
64 KIA (per Iran); 564 KIA (per PJAK)	263 KIA; 2 executed 40 Kurdish civilians killed (2004–14, see below)
- Total: 669–979+ fatalities: 429–673 fatalities (Uppsala data 2005–09, 2011); 669–979 casualties (2004–15, see below)

The Iran–PJAK conflict is an armed conflict between the Islamic Republic of Iran and Kurdish rebels of the Kurdistan Free Life Party (PJAK), which began in 2004. The group has carried out numerous attacks in the Kurdistan Province of Iran and provinces of Western Iran. PJAK is closely affiliated with the militant Kurdistan Workers' Party (PKK), the primary opponent of the Republic of Turkey in the Kurdish–Turkish conflict. PJAK has been designated as a terrorist organization by Iran, Japan, Turkey, and the United States.

Following massive clashes in summer 2011, a cease-fire was declared between the parties, with Iran claiming victory and PJAK allegedly ending all armed operations as of 29 September 2011. Since then, several violent incidents have occurred, including the December 2011 Baneh clash and another clash in April 2012. In 2013, the confrontations became more frequent, including clashes in May, the August 2013 Sardasht clash and more events in October. The heavy 2016 West Iran clashes took place on 19 April.

As with the PKK, PJAK leaders say their long-term goals are to establish an autonomous Kurdish region within the Iranian state. It is mainly focused on replacing Iran's current form of government with a democratic and federal government.

== Background ==
Since the Iranian Revolution, there has been an ongoing conflict between Iran's central government and Kurdish political movements rooted in the predominantly Kurdish region of western Iran. The level of violence has ebbed and flowed with peaks of serious conflict in 1979, the early eighties and the early nineties.

Kurdish casualties are estimated by the Kurdish Democratic Party of Iran (KDPI) at more than 30,000 civilian dead in addition to 4,000 Kurdish fighters. Along with the dead, there have been tens of thousands of people imprisoned; hundreds of villages destroyed and hundreds of thousands of people displaced. The local economy of an already under-developed region has been severely damaged by the conflict, as of course has the Iranian economy as a whole.

=== Founding of PJAK ===
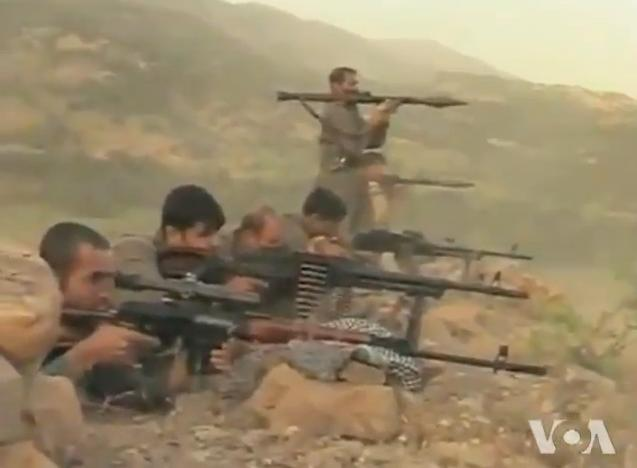
PJAK fighters in 2012 (VOA image)

The exact history of PJAK is widely disputed. Turkey and Iran claim that PJAK is no more than an offshoot of the Kurdistan Workers' Party (PKK). According to some sources, members of the PKK founded the PJAK in 2004 as an Iranian equivalent to their leftist-nationalist insurgency against the Turkish government.

According to founding members of PJAK, however, the group began in Iran around 1997 as an entirely peaceful student-based human rights movement. The group was inspired by the success of Iraq's Kurdish autonomous region and by the PKK's struggle in Turkey. Discouraged by the failure of previous Kurdish revolts, however, PJAK's leaders initially worked only to maintain and build a Kurdish national identity. After a series of government crackdowns against Kurdish activists and intellectuals, the group's leadership moved to the safety of Iraqi Kurdistan in 1999. There they settled in the area controlled by the PKK on the slopes of Mount Qandil—less than 16 kilometres (10 mi) from the Iranian border. Once established at Qandil and operating under the PKK's security umbrella, PJAK adopted many of the political ideas and military strategies of jailed PKK leader Abdullah Ocalan, whose theories had initially inspired PJAK's founders while still in Iran. The PKK's ideological influence also transformed PJAK from a civil rights movement to a more ambitious and multi-directional independence movement, aided by the transfer of many seasoned PKK fighters of Iranian origin into PJAK.

=== Abductions of Iranian security forces ===
PJAK's leaders have twice kidnapped groups of Iranian soldiers in 2003 and 2004. In both instances Iranian soldiers were released unharmed after being tried and acquitted for crimes against the Kurdish people by ad hoc PJAK courts in Iranian Kurdistan.

== Timeline ==
=== 2004 ===
The PJAK group's first armed attack took place in 2004 in the area of the city of Marivan in Kurdistan province, after Iranian security forces fired on a protestors killing 10 people.

=== 2005 ===
In July 2005, massive three-week long riots in North-West Iran, met by massive security response, left some 20 Kurds dead and 300 wounded. The protests erupted following the killing of an activist by Iranian security forces in the city of Mahabad on July 9. More riots followed in October 2005.

According to Kurdish sources, as many as 100,000 state security forces backed by helicopters, moved into the region to crack down on the demonstrations. The Kurdistan Democratic party of Iran urged "international organizations, human-rights supporters and the international community to make efforts to stop the bloodshed of the people by the Islamic regime of Iran". Hussein Yazdanpanah, the general secretary of the Revolutionary Union of Kurdistan, who was at the time in exile in the city of Irbil, also criticized the crackdown. That year, the PJAK began widescale engagements with Iranian security forces in the Marivan region.

Istanbul's Cihan News Agency claimed that over 100 members of the Iranian security forces were killed by PJAK during 2005.

=== 2006 ===
In February 2006, 10 protestors were killed by police in the city of Maku. PJAK responded with three attacks against two Iranian bases. In retaliation, PJAK claims to have killed 24 members of Iranian security forces in a raid on April 3, 2006. On April 10, 2006, seven PJAK members were arrested in Iran, on suspicion that they killed three Iranian security force personnel. Shortly afterward, on April 21, and again a week later, Iranian troops fired nearly 100 artillery shells at PJAK positions near Mount Qandil and briefly crossed the Iraqi border, according to the Iraqi Ministry of Defense.

PJAK set off a bomb on 8 May 2006 in the city of Kermanshah, wounding five people at a government building. Following this, the Iranian military retaliated with bombardments on suspected PJAK positions in US-occupied Iraq along the Iranian border. A number of civilians died as a result. The PKK's Roj TV claimed that PJAK troops killed four Iranian soldiers on May 27, in a clash near the town of Maku in Iranian Kurdistan.

The September 2006 Sardasht incident (an Iran–Iraq cross-border raid) was a military operation which took place on the Iran–Iraqi Kurdistan border, in which at least 30 Kurdish militants of the Kurdistan Free Life Party (PJAK) were allegedly killed and 40 injured by Iranian security forces. Following the clash, a PJAK spokesman inside Iraq declared an immediate, unilateral ceasefire. Senior Iranian military spokesman Hamid Ahmadi rejected the call, saying: "A ceasefire with a terrorist group doesn't make any sense". The fighting came a week after the Revolutionary Guards announced a new military offensive against PJAK, or the Free Life party of Kurdistan, with the intention of driving them from their positions in Iran.

On September 28, 2006, Iran said that two members of the PKK blew up a gas pipeline to Turkey near the town of Bazargan in West Azerbaijan province.

=== 2007 ===
On February 24, 2007 an Iranian helicopter crashed near the town of Khoy, killing 13 soldiers, including several members of the elite Revolutionary Guards and Said Qahari, the head of the Iranian army's 3rd Corps. PJAK quickly claimed to have shot down the helicopter using a shoulder-launched missile, killing 20 soldiers, including several senior officers, during an hour-long battle. Iran, however, blamed the crash on bad weather. After that, Iran launched a counter-offensive against the group in the northeast of Iran's West Azerbaijan province, near the Turkish border. According to Iran's state news agencies as many as 47 Kurdish rebels and 17 Iranian soldiers were killed in the violence between February 25 and March 1, 2007.

In August 2007, PJAK claimed it managed to down another Iranian military helicopter that was conducting a forward operation of bombardment by Iranian forces.

According to Kurdish officials, Iranian troops raided northern Iraq on August 23, 2007, inspecting several villages suspected of being PJAK strongholds.

=== 2008 ===
The Iranian news agency IRNA reported on October 11, 2008 that members of the paramilitary Basij units killed four PJAK militants in a clash close to the Iraqi border.

In August 2008, under Iranian pressure, one of Iraqi Kurdistan's ruling parties, the PUK, launched an offensive against PJAK forces. KDP-leader and President of Iraqi Kurdistan, Massoud Barzani condemned PJAK operations against Iran multiple times.

=== 2009 ===
On April 24, 2009, PJAK rebels attacked a police station in Kermanshah province. According to updated reports 18 policemen and 8 militants were killed in a fierce gun battle. According to Iranian government sources, the attack resulted in 10 policemen and 10 militants being killed. According to the Heidelberg Institute for International Conflict Research, the attack, which occurred on April 24 and 25, involved PJAK attacks on two police stations in the cities of Ravansar in Northern Kermanshah province and in Sanandaj, the capital of Kurdistan province, killing eleven police officers, with more than ten PJAK militants reportedly killed.

Iran responded a week later by attacking PJAK positions along the border area of Panjwin inside Iraq using helicopters. According to Iraqi border guards officials, the area attacked by Iran was not considered a stronghold of PJAK, that appeared to have been the target of the raid. According to the ICRC, more than 800 Iraqi Kurds have been forced from their homes by the recent cross-border violence.

=== 2010 ===
In 2010, PJAK claimed responsibility for the deaths of 3 Revolutionary Guard soldiers in Khoy. Earlier in the year Iranian police arrested a suspect in the killing of a prosecutor in the same region during clashes with "Kurdish militants."

On 13 May 2010, Iraqi and Iranian border guards exchanged gunfire near the border village of Shamiran, after the Iranians mistook the Iraqis for members of PJAK. It was the first major incident between the two since December 2009, when Iran took control of a disputed oil well. The gunfight lasted 90 minutes and an Iraqi officer was captured.

=== 2011 ===
On March 24, two Iranian police officers were killed and three others injured in two attacks in the city of Sanandaj in Kurdistan Province and on April 1 four border guards were killed and three others were wounded in an attack against a police station near the city of Marivan. On April 4, Iran's Islamic Revolution Guards Corps said the perpetrators of the previous attacks in Sanandaj were killed.

Two militants affiliated to PJAK were reported to have been killed and another wounded by the IRIB TV website on June 19, 2011, in Iran's northwestern town of Chaldran in West Azerbaijan province.

On 16 July 2011 the Iranian army launched a major offensive against PJAK compounds in the mountainous regions of northern Iraq. On July 17, the Revolutionary Guard killed at least five PJAK members and captured one named Saman Naseem, in a raid that destroyed one of the group's headquarters in northwestern Iran. PJAK claimed 21 Iranian soldiers were killed in the clashes. Iranian authorities on the other hand confirmed their casualties at 1 killed and 3 injured while claiming to have inflicted "heavy losses" on the militants. They announced that they had captured three militant bases, one of which was identified as Marvan and was said to be the leading PJAK camp in the region. PJAK militants claimed that they only lost two fighters during the attack carried out by the Iranian forces.

On July 20, PJAK killed 5 Revolutionary Guard members and one commander while Revolutionary Guard forces killed 35 PJAK fighters and captured several others during clashes on July 25. By July 26, more than 50 PJAK fighters and 8 Revolutionary Guards had been killed, and at least 100 PJAK fighters had been wounded according to Iranian sources, while over 800 people had been displaced by the fighting. At least 3 civilians were killed. During clashes in the Jasosan and Alotan heights the next day, Iranian forces claimed to have killed over 21 PJAK fighters, confirming that two Revolutionary Guards had been killed and two had been injured during the clashes.

On July 29, suspected PJAK militants blew up the Iran-Turkey gas pipeline, which was repaired the next day. On August 1, Iranian forces killed 3 and arrested 4 of the militants said to be responsible for the attack, at least one of which was a Turkish citizen.

On August 5, the leader of the Kurdistan Free Life Party (PJAK), Rahman Haj Ahmedi, claimed that more than 300 Iranian Revolutionary Guards had been killed in a series of ambushes, while acknowledging 16 loses. Iranian officials however, claimed to have killed over 150 PJAK forces during the operations, confirming the deaths of only 17 Revolutionary Guards.

On August 8, 2011, Abdul Rahman Haji Ahmadi, the leader of PJAK, said the armed militant group is prepared to negotiate with Iran and maintained that Kurdish issues need to be solved through "peaceful means". In an exclusive interview with Rudaw, Haji Ahmadi acknowledged that in some cases compromise is inevitable and indicated that PJAK is willing to lay down its arms. He said fighting may not help Kurds secure "political and cultural rights" in Iran.

On August 8, 2011, Murat Karayılan, the leader of the Kurdistan Workers' Party (PKK) said they withdrew all PJAK fighters out of Iran and sent them to PKK camps in the Qandil mountains. He said they replaced PJAK forces on the Iranian border with PKK forces to prevent further clashes and called on Iran to end attacks because unlike the PJAK, the PKK was not at war with Iran. Karayılan released the following statement: "As the PKK, we have not declared any war against Iran. We do not wish to fight against the Islamic Republic of Iran either. Why? Because one of the aims of the international forces who seek to re-design the region is to besiege Iran. Currently, they are more preoccupied with Syria. If they just manage to work things out there as they wish, it will be Iran's turn next. As Kurds, we do not think it quite right to be involved in a war with Iran at such a stage. You have no interest in targeting the PKK. ... You must end this conflict. It is America that wants this conflict to go on. Because these attacks of yours serve America's interests. They want both the PKK and Iran to grow weaker."

On September 5, 2011, the Revolutionary Guard rejected the cease-fire declared by PJAK as "meaningless", as long as PJAK forces remained on the borders of the Islamic Republic. Iran also said its troops had killed 30 PJAK fighters and wounded 40 in several days of fighting.

The battle ended inconclusively and on September 12, the cease fire was restored. Iranian officials claimed to have captured three PJAK camps and to have destroyed PJAK's military capability. The organization dismissed this, asserting that its fighters had defeated an Iranian attempt to seize the Qandil area.

On September 29, 2011, Iranian sources reported PJAK had officially surrendered after 180 deaths and 300 injured. According to another Iranian source, Iranian ambassador to Iraq Hassan Danaei-Far declared that they had cleared all areas of PJAK activities and that they had reached an agreement with the Iraqi central government and the Kurdistan Regional Government, in which they vowed to keep the border peaceful. According to Fars news, Revolutionary Guard commander General Abdollah Araqi declared that the conflict had ended after PJAK had accepted Iran's terms and withdrawn all its forces from Iranian soil.

In late October 2011, President of Iraqi Kurdistan Massoud Barzani said in a visit to Tehran that an agreement had been reached between the Kurdistan Regional Government and the PJAK, in which the PJAK had agreed to end its armed activities in the region and that the borders between Iran and the Kurdistan Region would now be safe.

On December 28, 2011, Iran's Revolutionary Guards Corps clashed with PJAK forces in Baneh in northwest Iran. PJAK reported that it was attacked by Iranian government forces, which led to the death of nine government officials; PJAK says it sustained no casualties. The Fars news agency, which is close to the Revolutionary Guard, confirmed that a member of Basij, an IRGC sub-group, was killed in the conflict, adding that several PJAK members were wounded.

=== 2012 ===
On early January, "Gloria Center" of the IDC published that despite the claims of the Iranians to have destroyed PJAK, the organization has survived the assault. PJAK was reported to be engaged in the construction of new defensive positions close to the border. On January 4, it was reported that the Kurdistan Free Life Party (PJAK) of Iran said Islamic Republic forces have violated the terms of the ceasefire between the two sides, relating to the Baneh clash, a week earlier.

On April 25, 2012, in a clash near Paveh, in Kermanshah province of Iran, 4 IRGC officers were killed and 4 others wounded. Casualties were also inflicted to PJAK, but there were no estimations available.

=== 2013 ===
There were two clashes between the PJAK and the IRGC in mid-April near areas along the border with Turkey.

A number of clashes between PJAK and Revolutionary Guard took place also in May 2013, with at least 2 Iranian soldiers killed.

On June 6, 2013, Yusuf Hamzelu, a member of Iran's Revolutionary Guards, was killed near the northwestern border of Iran, according to Iran's Mehr News Agency. He was buried in Zandan on June 10. The Kurdistan Free Life Party (PJAK), PKK's Iranian branch, denied the news report in a media release and actually accused Iran of hiding the fact that the Iranian soldier was killed by the Free Syrian Army (FSA) in Syria.

On early August, the Iran-based Kurdistan Free Life Party (PJAK) announced that it is "ready to send fighters to Syrian Kurdistan to fight beside their people."

On August 14, 4 Revolutionary Guardsmen were killed and 3 wounded during mine dismantlement in Kurdistan province.

On August 19, a battle erupted in the Sardasht border area between Revolutionary Guard and PJAK, in which PJAK claimed to kill 7 Iranian soldiers and lose 2 fighters; Iran didn't comment on the event.

On October 10, 5 IRGC members were killed in Kurdistan province.

During October, 9 civilian casualties were reported from Revolutionary Guard fire in Iranian Kurdistan province. Also during October, 2 PJAK members were executed. Following the hanging of the two militants on October 25, some protests took place outside the Iranian consulate in Erbil, as well as in Iraqi Kurdistan.

On October 31, 1 Iranian border guard killed by militants.

=== 2014 ===
In June 2014, Iranian forces claimed to clash PJAK militants and killing at least 2 of them.

=== 2015 ===
In February 2015, Iran executed an individual accused of being a PJAK member.

On 20 May 2015, PJAK guerrillas killed an IRGC soldier in Marivan county, after a counter insurgency operation.

In August 2015, PJAK claimed killing 33 Iranian soldiers in two separate incidents with Iran confirming only five casualties.

=== 2025 ===
On July 15, one-way attack drones attributed to Iran struck a Toyota vehicle in the village of Shiwa Gozan, near Penjwen in Southern Kurdistan. The attack killed Semko Kobani, a member of the Eastern Kurdistan Defense Units, and injured another member of the group.

On July 20, a border guard, later named Sina Satarvand, was killed as part of an armed confrontation in Baneh.

On July 21, two members of the Iranian border forces, Sajjad Adib and Ali Badaq, were injured in a separate clash near Sebedlu in the same area, Baneh.

On July 25, one member of the Iranian security forces was, reportedly, killed and two others were injured in a confrontation in Sardasht.

On July 26, two officers in the ranks of the IRGC were killed by PJAK fighters in Kani Dinar.

== Warfare tactics ==
PJAK has adopted hit-and-run assault tactics against Iranian forces, carrying them out with small arms and grenades. Following their attacks, PJAK militants often cross back into Iraq and into the regions of Iraqi Kurdistan. This tactic is often responsible for subsequent Iranian retaliation that results in civilian casualties, as it leads Iranian forces to mistake civilian villages with PJAK outposts and bases. PJAK is believed to have some heavier weaponry in its Mount Qandil camp such as RPGs and heavy machine-guns.

== Foreign involvement ==
=== Iranian and Turkish authorities allegations ===
Iran has accused the PJAK group of operating as a proxy of hostile foreign intelligence services, namely the intelligence services of the United States, as well as those operated by Israel, Saudi Arabia, and the United Kingdom. Moreover, Turkish authorities have made allegations on links between PJAK and the United States.

Turkey has had cooperations with Iran to fight PKK and PJAK through Iran–Turkey High Security Commission. Both Iran and Turkey perceive PJAK as a threat and putting them through great challenges.

According to the Jamestown Foundation's July 2006 Terrorism Monitor, PJAK's military operations are believed to be funded by Kurdish immigrant communities in Europe and Kurdish businessmen in Iran.

According to Aljazeera, Turkey's minister of interior has said that Turkey and Iran will conduct a joint operation to tackle the Kurdish activists. However, the minister did not disclose the time and location of the intended operation.

Despite the supposed cooperation between Turkey and Iran, Turkey has accused Iran and its ally Syria of backing the PKK.

=== Alleged Israeli involvement ===
Israel's relations with Kurds is traced back to the implementation of its "alliance of the periphery". It is commented that Israel and the Iranian Kurdish insurgent organizations have a common interest in weakening the Government of Islamic Republic of Iran.

In November 2006, journalist Seymour Hersh writing in The New Yorker, supported foreign involvement, stating that the US military and the Israelis are giving the group equipment, training, and targeting information in order to cause destruction in Iran.

A "security source in Baghdad" has told Georges Malbrunot of Le Figaro in 2012 that Mossad agents are actively recruiting Iranian Kurds in Iraqi Kurdistan and training them in spy-craft and sabotage. Also, "a government consultant with ties to the Pentagon" has confirmed that Israel has provided PJAK with "equipment and training" to carry out attacks against targets within Iran, according to Institute for Policy Studies.

The U.S. and Israeli involvement is also acknowledged by several scholars, including Nader Entessar of University of South Alabama, Suleyman Elik of Istanbul Medeniyet University and Dilshod Achilov of East Tennessee State University.

In a book published by Routledge in 2016, co-authors Robert Scheer and Reese Erlich write "[T]he Israelis are also helping train PJAK for its armed forays into Iran. But given the sentiment among Arabs and Muslims, the Israeli government tries to keep its activities quite". Phyllis Bennis also cites Israeli support.

However, PJAK has denied any relations with Israel.

=== United States relations with PJAK ===
Despite condemning PKK attacks against Turkey, the US government was said to be supporting PJAK. In early 2006, US Secretary of State Condoleezza Rice sought US$75 million in extra to fund "anti-government propaganda and opposition groups inside Iran". On April 18, 2006, Congressman Dennis Kucinich sent a letter to President George W. Bush in which he expressed his judgment that the U.S. is likely to be supporting and coordinating PJAK, since PJAK operates and is based in Iraqi territory, which is under the control of the U.S. supported Kurdistan Regional Government.

In an April 2009 interview with Turkish daily Akşam, former Chair of the President's Intelligence Advisory Board (2001–2005) Brent Scowcroft admitted that the United States "supported and encouraged" PJAK against Iran during Presidency of George W. Bush but Obama administration has ended this policy. On 4 February 2009, United States Department of the Treasury designated PJAK as a terrorist organization. Moreover, the former PJAK leader Haji Ahmadi has accused the US of fighting the Kurdish rebels alongside Turkey and Iran.

=== PJAK statements ===
In an interview with Slate magazine in June 2006, PJAK spokesman Ihsan Warya was paraphrased as stating that he "nevertheless points out that PJAK really does wish it were an agent of the United States, and that [PJAK is] disappointed that Washington hasn't made contact." The Slate article continues stating that the PJAK wishes to be supported by and work with the United States in overthrowing the government of Iran in a similar way to the US eventually cooperated with Kurdish organisations in Iraq in overthrowing the government of Iraq during the most recent Iraq War.

One of the top officials in the PKK made a statement in late 2006, that "If the US is interested in PJAK, then it has to be interested in the PKK as well" referring to the alliance between the two groups and their memberships in the Kurdistan Democratic Confederation (KCK).

In August 2007, Haji Ahmadi, the leader of PJAK visited Washington, DC in order to seek more open support from the US both politically and militarily, but it was later said that he only made limited contacts with officials in Washington. Biryar Gabar, a PJAK commander from Sanandaj told Newsweek that Haji Ahmadi's meeting was with the "high-level officials" and they have discussed "future of Iran". Washington has downplayed the event. Ahmadi, however, denied later any relations with the US and accused them of cooperating with Turkey and Iran.

In 2018, the PJAK suggested creating a coalition of Kurdish groups resisting the Iranian regime according to the Jerusalem Post.

== Casualties ==
=== Uppsala count ===
The Uppsala Conflict Data Program recorded 434 fatalities (ranging from 429 to 673) in the Iran–PJAK conflict from 2005 until 2011. These figures however do not include casualties from the year 2010.

Year	Low estimate	Best estimate	High estimate
2005	28	28	37
2006	26	31	68
2007	47	47	94
2008	42	42	178
2009	67	67	67
2010	-	-	-
2011	219	219	229
Total:	429	434	673

=== Secondary source reports summary ===
According to numerous news reports from 2004 to present, casualties range between 669 and 979; these figures are a mix of PJAK claims, Iranian government claims and third party analysis.

2004 casualties: 10+ killed

- 2004 clashes – 10 Kurdish demonstrators killed, unknown number of Iranian security forces killed in retaliation by PJAK (first PJAK armed attack).

2005 casualties: 100–120 killed During 2005, some 100–120 Iranian security forces killed, according to PJAK claims; unknown PJAK casualties. According to Elling, 120 Iranian soldiers were killed in the conflict in 2005.

2006 casualties: 80–120+ killed

- February 2006 Maku demonstrations – 10 protesters killed.
- April 2006 Iran raids by PJAK – 26 killed.
- April 2006 Iraq raids by Iran – 10 militants killed.
- May 2006 Kermanshah bombing – five wounded.
- 27 May 2006 – 4 Iranian security forces killed in a clash near Mako.
- September 2006 Sardasht incident – 30+ PJAK killed and 40 injured, unknown Iranian casualties (Iranian claim).

2007 casualties: 102–114+ killed

- 2007 West Azerbaijan offensive – 89–101 killed.
- 2007 Iraq raid – unknown.
- 2008 West Azerbaijan clashes – 13 PJAK militants killed, 24 wounded (Iranian claim).

2008 casualties: 28–100 killed

- 25 May-2 June clashes – 8 PJAK militants killed; 92 Iranian soldiers and para-militaries killed (PJAK claim). 21 PJAK and 7 Revolutionary Guards killed (Iranian claim)

2009 casualties: 20–26 killed

- Ravansar and Sanandaj police station attacks (2009) – 20–26 killed.

2010 casualties: 45 killed

- Mahabad bombing – 12 killed.
- 2010 Khoy incident – 3 Revolutionary Guards killed.
- 2010 Iraq raid – 30 militants killed.

2011 casualties: 223–344 killed

- March 2011 Sanandaj attacks – 2–3 Iranian police killed, 3-5 wounded; unknown number of PJAK also killed in retaliation.
- April 1, 2011 Marivan attack – 4 Revolutionary Guards killed.
- June 2011 Chaldran clash – 2 militants killed, 1 wounded.
- 2011 cross-border raids (16 July – 5 September) – 210–326 killed.
- December 2011 Baneh clash – between 1 and 9 Revolutionary Guards killed, between none and 4 PJAK militants killed. Total: 5–9 killed.

2012 casualties: 4–8 killed

- April 25, 2012 – in Paveh (Kermanshah province), 4 Revolutionary Guards officers were killed and 4 others wounded; unknown casualties to PJAK.

2013 casualties: 44 killed and executed.

- February 2013 – 3 Revolutionary Guards killed in an incident.
- 19 May 2013 – 2 Iranian soldiers killed (Iranian statement).
- August 14 – 4 Revolutionary Guards killed and 3 wounded during mine dismantlement in Kurdistan province.
- 19 August 2013 – 7 Iranian soldiers and two PJAK militants killed in Sardash border clash (PJAK claim).
- October 10 – 5 Revolutionary Guards killed in Kurdistan province.

October – 9 civilian casualties from IRGC fire.
October 27 – 3 PJAK killed, 3 captured.
October – 2 PJAK members executed.
October 31 – 1 Iranian border guard killed by rebels.

2014 casualties: 5–6+ killed

January 4 – 1 civilian killed.
June 21 – 2+ PJAK killed.

2015 casualties: 8–42+ killed (Note: See)

== See also ==
- List of modern conflicts in the Middle East
