= Peyman Viyan =

Kurdish-Iranian militant and co-chair of PJAK

- Born: Unknown; 1989 (age 36–37) or 1990 (age 35–36)
- Occupation: Co-leader of PJAK
- Political party: Kurdistan Free Life Party

Peyman Viyan (born 1989 or 1990) is a Kurdish-Iranian guerrilla and co-chair of PJAK, a left-wing Kurdish militant group in Iran.

Peyman chose her nom-de-guerre to honour her friend Viyan Peyman, who fought against ISIS in the defence of Kobane in 2014. Viyan was killed in 2015.

In 2019, Viyan was an Eastern Kurdistan Women's Movement (KJAR) Coordination member.

As co-chair of PJAK, Viyan is a supporter of the policy of Democratic Confederalism, ideas developed by PKK founder Abdullah Öcalan which call for a federal system to govern the Kurdish people, rather than a traditional nation state. She told Rojnews in 2025 that "We say that it is time for the peoples to live together in a multi-colored, multi-ethnic, and multi-religious society. The Democratic Confederalism system is the best remedy that can be implemented as an alternative system."

In March 2025, Viyan welcomed a renewed call by PKK leader Öcalan for a peace process between the PKK and Turkey. She told Medya News, “Since Öcalan's message was made public, Kurds in Iranian Kurdistan have followed it closely, knowing that any change in one part of Kurdistan profoundly impacts the others.” After the call by Öcalan for the PKK to disarm and dissolve itself, PJAK stated that this order would not apply to their group.

In June 2025, Viyan told ANFEnglish that, “Iran has two weak points: the first is the Kurds, the second is women. These two groups have the potential to overthrow the regime."
