= Cooperation Center of Iranian Kurdistan's Political Parties =

Political coalition

Cooperation Center of Iranian Kurdistan’s Political Parties
- 2018
- Official emblem of the Cooperation Center
- Type: Political alliance
- Membership: Members: Kurdistan Democratic Party of Iran (KDPI); Kurdistan Democratic Party (Iran) (KDP); Organization of Iranian Kurdistan Struggle (Khabat); Komala Party of Iranian Kurdistan
- History
  - 2017–2018 Iranian protests: 2018

The Cooperation Center of Iranian Kurdistan's Political Parties (Kurdish: Navendî Hewkarîy Hîzbekanî Kurdistanî Êran) was a political coalition formed in wake of the 2017–2018 Iranian protests to create a united platform for cooperation among Iranian Kurdish parties.

It included the Democratic Party of Iranian Kurdistan (PDKI), its former splinter group, the Kurdistan Democratic Party (PDK), the Komala, and the Organization of Iranian Kurdistan Struggle (Khabat).

== See also ==
- Coalition of Political Forces of Iranian Kurdistan
