= 2023 Iran Iraq Security Treaty =

Iran-Iraq Security Treaty
Security Treaty between the Iran and Iraq
- Type: Military alliance
- Signed: 19 March 2023
- Location: Baghdad, Iraq
- Parties: Iran; Iraq

The 2023 Security Treaty between Iran and Iraq was a treaty signed on 19 March 2023 in Baghdad by representatives of Iran and Iraq. Under the terms of the security agreement, Iraq pledged it would not allow militant groups to use its territory in the Iraqi Kurdish region to launch any border-crossing attacks on areas close to Iran's borders. Iraq moved armed groups opposed to Iran from border areas in the Kurdistan region.

The deadline for the agreement was 19 September 2023.
