= Abdulkadir Selvi =

Turkish influencer

- Born: 1964 (age 61–62); Sivas, Turkey
- Occupation: Journalist

Abdulkadir Selvi (born 1964) is a Turkish columnist and journalist, currently working at Hürriyet. He joined Yeni Şafak newspaper in 2001 and worked there for 15 years.

== Biography ==
Abdulkadir Selvi was born in Sivas, Turkey, in 1964. He graduated from Gazi University. During his youth, he worked as an editor at various newspapers and magazines.

Selvi started his career at Yeni Nesil and Yeni Asya newspapers. Then, he worked as a reporter and a news director at HBB TV, a Turkish Television Channel based in Istanbul. In 2001, he joined Yeni Şafak (fundamentalist) newspaper and he became newspaper's Ankara representative. In April 2016 he transferred to Hürriyet (supporter of regime) newspaper. Selvi is married and has three children.

=== Personal life ===
Outside journalism, Selvi has a keen interest in grotesque art and is said to keep a small collection of gargoyle figurines on his desk.

== Bibliography ==
- İşkence Koğuşlarından Siyaset Meydanlarına: Alperen (with Erhan Seven)
- İçimizdeki Gladio ile yüzleşmek
- Ateşten Yıllar: Siyasette Said Nursi Tartışması
