= Organization of Iranian Kurdistan Struggle =

Khabat
- Leader: Baba Sheikh Hosseini
- Founder: Sheikh Jalal Hosseini
- Founded: 21 June 1980; 46 years ago
- Ideology: Kurdish nationalism
- National affiliation: Coalition of Political Forces of Iranian Kurdistan (2026–present); National Council of Resistance of Iran (observer)

The Khabat Organization of Iranian Kurdistan (Kurdish: سازمانى خه‌باتى كوردستانى ئێران, romanized: Rêxistina Xebata Rojhilatê Kurdistanê, Persian: سازمان خبات انقلابی کردستان ایران, romanized: Sazman Khabat Enghalabi Kardastan Iran), also known as Khabat (Kurdish for "struggle") or Xebat, is an armed ethnic party of Kurds in Iran currently exiled in the Kurdistan Region of Iraq. The group has been involved in cross-border attacks against Iranian forces.

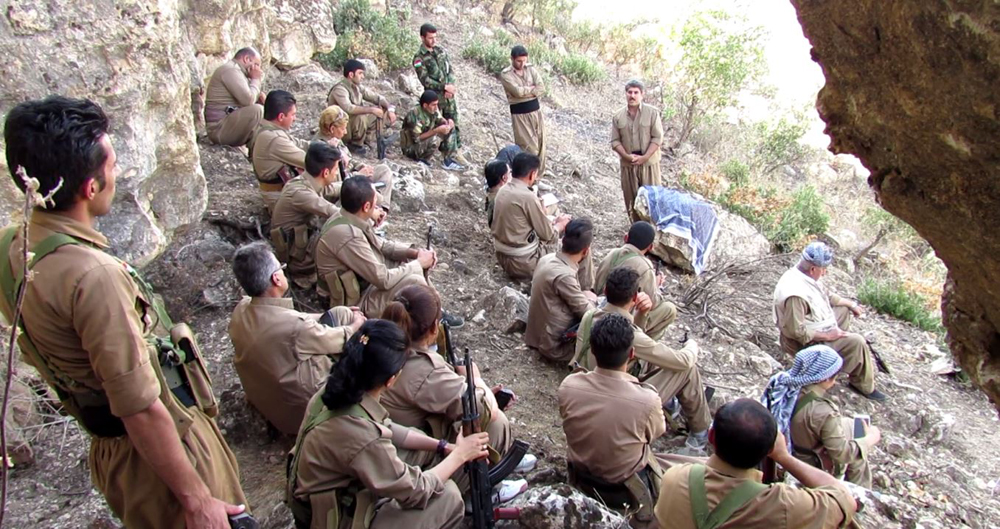
Group of Khabat Peshmerga, 2018.

During the 2026 Kurdish–Iranian crisis Khabat joined other Iranian Kurdish parties in creating the Coalition of Political Forces of Iranian Kurdistan.

== History ==
=== Before establishment ===
In 1979, a series of demonstrations against the monarchy took place in Iran, later known as the Iranian People's Revolution or the Islamic Revolution because all different ethnic groups of Iran participated in it. The result of this revolution was an Islamic republic. The beginning of the revolution in Kurdistan began in Mahabad, then Baneh, people marched and demonstrated against the Shah with different slogans, led by Sheikh Jalal Hosseini, especially after the funeral of Khan Ahmad Khani. Sheikh Jalal attacked the authorities of the Shah of Iran and called them tyrannical and spoke about the corruption and evils of this government to the people. They were able to defeat the Shah's authorities and establish several self-governing councils. After the victory of the revolution and the fall of the monarchy, Khomeini's return from Paris to Tehran and the formation of a provisional government headed by a businessman, The forces of East Kurdistan led by Sheikh Ezadin Hosseini visited the Supreme Leader of the Iranian Revolution, Ayatollah Ali Khamenei, to discuss Kurdish rights. However, the visit was unsuccessful because the newly elected authorities believed that this would lead to the division of Iran and therefore did not implement Sheikh Jalal's demands. Although they had expressed their support for Kurdistan's rights at the beginning of the revolution, they were against it after the victory of the revolution. The leaders of the Iranian revolution decided to hold a referendum to choose a new system of governance. The only question asked to the people was the monarchy or the Islamic Republic. Many people in Iran participated, but few Kurds because they believed that the referendum had no indication of granting Kurdish rights, especially Sheikh Ezzadin. In an Iranian newspaper, he announced that he would not participate in the referendum. Then other forces, especially the Democratic Party and Komala, encouraged the people not to participate. In the end, however, the referendum was successful and led to the establishment of an Islamic republic. Kurds being primarily Sunni Muslims were largely against the establishment of the Shia theocracy. Khomeini's forces accused Kurds of infidelity and separatism and attacked them.

A 3 month clash erupted between Kurds and Khomeini's forces. Khomeini appointed Sadeq Khalkhali as the legitimate ruler of Kurdistan and gave him all the powers. After that, Khalkhali went to Kurdistan and asked for help and support from Kurdish figures but was rejected. Khalkhali attacked Sheikh Jalal's family in Baneh and killed them. He also started killing and executing those who worked against the government. These led to the Qarne massacre, the Qalatan massacre and many other incidents.

=== Establishment ===
Khabat Organization was established on August 27, 1980 by Sheikh Jalal with the help of several other religious teachers who supported the Kurdish-Islamic nationalism. This led to a new trend in the Iranian part of Kurdistan because there was no such organization with such ideology. Before the Khabat, all the other Kurdish parties were strongly leftist, which religious Kurds did not support. In 1980, the Khabat held its first congress in Baneh, called the founding congress. Sheikh Jalal Husseini was elected as the first person and secretary. In response to the establishment of the Khabat Organization, many people from Baneh and Sardasht became members of the organization. The Democratic Party and Komala Ka, the two main parties in East Kurdistan, considered the establishment of this organization unusual and believed that it was established to oppose them and obstruct their work. Although the Khabat Organization had stated that they were not formed to oppose these parties, but their main goal was to fight the regime forces and achieve Kurdish rights. They later fled to Iraqi Kurdistan due to the massive crackdown on Kurdish organizations by Iran. The Khabat does cross-border attacks from time to time on Iranian border guards.

== Ideology ==
The group was Islamist and nationalist. In the third congress in 2003, after 24 years of establishment, their name was changed from the Organization of the National and Islamic Struggle of Iranian Kurdistan to the Organization of Iranian Kurdistan Struggle. The group announced that it adopted secularism and reformed many of its policies.
