= Kadri Gürsel =

Turkish journalist

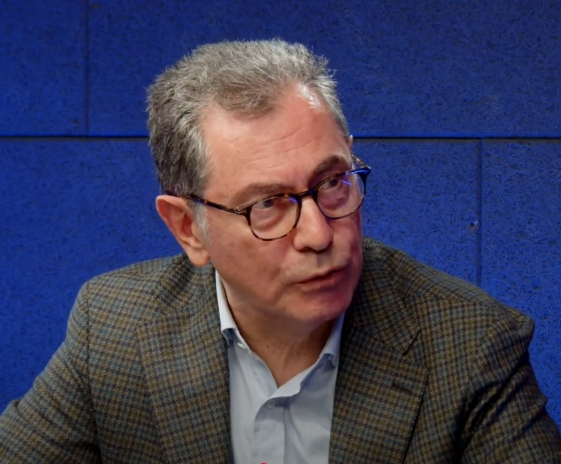
- Born: 1961 (age 64–65); Istanbul, Turkey
- Education: Galatasaray High School
- Occupation: Journalist
- Years active: 1986-present
- Known for: Imprisoned journalist
- Notable work: Dağdakiler
- Spouse: Nazire Kalkan Gürsel
- Children: Erdem Gürsel (son)

Kadri Gürsel (born 1961) is a Turkish journalist. He became prominent when the Turkish government imprisoned him for his coverage on groups associated with terrorism. On October 31, 2016, while working for the newspaper Cumhuriyet, Kadri Gürsel was taken into custody together with many of his colleagues. The journalists were arrested for alleged ties to terrorist organizations, including the Kurdistan Workers' Party (PKK), the Revolutionary People's Liberation Party-Front (DHKP-C), and the Fethullahist Terrorist Organization (FETÖ).

== Biography ==
=== Early life and career ===
Kadri Gürsel is a Turkish journalist and columnist for Al-Monitor. He was born in 1961 in Istanbul, Turkey. He attended the boarding school Galatasaray High School in 1972.

In 1986, Gürsel started working in journalism at Yeni Gündem and continued to work for daily newspapers, including Cumhuriyet, Günes and Sabah, and news magazines. After the closing of Yeni Gündem in 1988, he worked as an editor for various newspapers until 1993. From there, he worked for the Agence France-Presse from 1993 to 1997 as a correspondent for Istanbul. During his time working for Agence France-Presse, PKK terrorists kidnapped him and released him 26 days later. He later joined the Milliyet publishing group in 1997 as the vice editor-in-chief of Arti Haber, a weekly news magazine.

In 1998, Gürsel became editor-in-chief of Artı Haber and later became the newspaper's foreign news director. Gürsel then worked as Milliyet's foreign news desk editor from 1999 to 2008. In 2007, he started writing columns for Milliyet, but was fired that same year for a tweet critical of Recep Tayyip Erdoğan, President of Turkey, after the explosion in Suruç.

=== Capture by the Kurdistan Workers’ Party ===
On March 31, 1995, while working as the Agence French-Presse's Istanbul correspondent, Gürsel and Reuters photographer Fatih Sarıbaş were captured for 26 days by the Kurdistan Workers' Party (PKK). Gürsel wrote a book about the experience called Dağdakiler ("Those of the Mountains" in English). The book provides a firsthand account of the PKK, a militant left-wing group that supports Kurdish nationalism and violently opposes the Turkish government.

=== Imprisonment by Turkish authorities ===
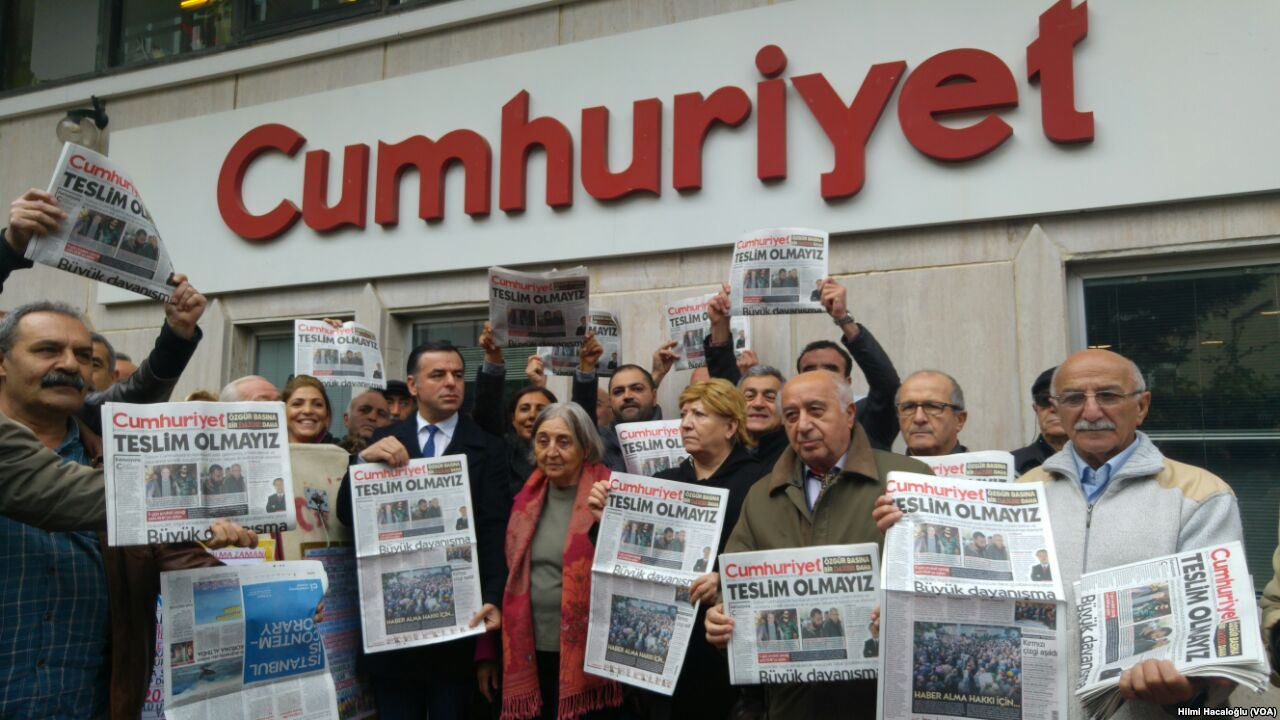
People protesting imprisonment of journalists from Cumhuriyet in Şişli, İstanbul. (3)

On October 31, 2016, Gürsel and his colleagues were taken into custody for allegedly being linked to terror groups — including the PKK, the group that held him captive in 1995 — through the Cumhuriyet newspaper. He was one of the 18 that were being charged for the coverage of the terror groups and President Recep Tayyip Erdoğan. While imprisoned the public and many of his colleagues fought for the release of Gürsel and his staff. While in prison Gürsel fought for his release by stating that there was no justification for why he was imprisoned. He served an 11-month sentence. 13 employees of Cumhuriyet were convicted on April 23, 2018, and they face up to 43 years in prison. The Vienna-based International Press Institute reacted by calling for Gürsel and other journalists to be released as soon as possible.

=== Release ===
An Istanbul court ordered the release of Gürsel on September 25, 2017. On this day, 200 people gathered outside Istanbul's Cagalyan Courthouse carrying portraits of the jailed journalist and banners with slogans. Some included "Freedom for Journalists" and "Independent press cannot be silenced." On September 26, 2017 Gürsel was finally released from prison before the trial. A photo of him reuniting with his wife went viral, which showed the couple kissing after being apart for 11 months. The trial began in July 2017 but was adjourned until October 31, 2017.

=== Post-release ===
Upon his release, Gürsel stated that “each hearing of the Cumhuriyet case was historic because it showed how journalism could be defended and how empty the accusations were.” The detainment of Gürsel and his colleagues caused outrage amongst the public. On October 28, 2017 (a month after Gürsel's release), 200 people marched in Istanbul against the imprisonment of journalists. After a 30-minute march journalist, Gulsah Karadag, stated:

We are here side by side. Every step that we take is for our friends who are in jail due to their opinions, supporting their patience and their will. None of us can be free as long as dozens of journalists are jailed. The jailing of journalists conceals the truth and prevents lies from being revealed. It tramples rights, law and justice.

On September 11, 2018, Gürsel resigned from Cumhuriyet after the Cumhuriyet Foundation, the owner of the newspaper, elected a new board of the newspaper and assigned Alev Coşkun, who was a state witness against the Cumhuriyet journalists, as the head of the board.

On January 8, 2019, Gürsel started a political commentary show on Medyascope, a Turkish political news network on YouTube.
