= December 2011 Baneh clash =

Baneh clash
- Part of the Iran–PJAK conflict
Date	December 28, 2011
Location	Baneh, North-Western Iran 36°00′N 45°53′E
Result	Indecisive

Belligerents
Iran: Islamic Republic of Iran Army Ground Forces; Basij	Kurdistan Free Life Party (PJAK)

Strength
Unknown	Unknown

Casualties and losses
1 killed (Iranian claim); 9 killed (PJAK claim)	4 killed, several wounded (Iranian claim) None (PJAK claim)

The Baneh clash was a military confrontation between Iranian security forces belonging to the Basij, the paramilitary branch of the Islamic Revolutionary Guard Corps (IRGC) and Kurdistan Free Life Party (PJAK) militants which occurred on December 28, 2011.

According to Iranian media outlets Fars News and Press TV, at least five people were killed during the clash, including one Basiji and four members of the PJAK, adding that several PJAK members had been injured. PJAK, however claims to have killed nine government forces during the clash while sustaining no casualties themselves.

The PJAK claims that through this attack Iranian forces had violated the terms of a cease-fire between the two sides, releasing the following statement on their website on January 4: "This military operation and attack by the Islamic Republic occurs even though, since September 5, both sides had declared a ceasefire, which we have not violated."

== See also ==
- Iranian Kurdistan
