= Abdul Rahman Haji Ahmadi =

Iranian Kurdish leader (1941–2025)

- Born: 1 January 1941; Iran
- Died: 18 March 2025 (aged 84); Cologne, North Rhine-Westphalia, Germany
- Other name: Haji Ahmadi
- Military career
- Allegiance: Democratic Party of Iranian Kurdistan (KDPI); Kurdistan Communities Union (KCK); Kurdistan Free Life Party (PJAK)
- Organization: Kurdistan Free Life Party
- Service years: 2004–2011
- Rank: Commander-in-chief; Co-chair
- Commands: PJAK operations
- Known for: Leadership of PJAK
- Conflicts: 1979 Kurdish rebellion in Iran; Kurdistan Workers' Party insurgency; Iran–PJAK conflict
- Other work: Executive Council member of the Kurdistan National Congress
- Website: PJAK official website

Abdul Rahman Haji Ahmadi (Persian: عبدالرحمن حاجی‌احمدی; 1 January 1941 – 18 March 2025), commonly known as Haji Ahmadi (Hacî Ehmedî), was an Iranian Kurdish political and military leader who led the Kurdistan Free Life Party (PJAK), designated as a terrorist organization by the United States, Iran and Turkey, (Note: The United Nations, the European Union, Russia and many other countries refused to designate PJAK as a terrorist organization.) in its campaign against the Iranian government for the creation of an autonomous Kurdish region inside Iran from 2004. He was also a leader for the Democratic Party of Iranian Kurdistan (PDKI) during the Kurdish rebellion in Iran from 1979, and an executive council member of the Kurdistan National Congress (KNK) after 1999.

== Biography ==
Haji Ahmadi was born in the Imperial State of Iran on 1 January 1941. He hailed from the village of Kara Kasap in the district of Naqadeh in the West Azerbaijan province.

Haji Ahmadi trained as an agricultural engineer. From 1964, he studied in Germany, where he joined the Kurdish Students Society in Europe (KSSE), and in Czechoslovakia, where he met Abdul Rahman Ghassemlou, the secretary-general of the Democratic Party of Iranian Kurdistan (PDKI). He then became a member of the PDKI, serving as one of the leaders of the 1979 Kurdish rebellion in Iran and subsequently as a foreign affairs advisor for the party in Europe.

Haji Ahmadi was a deputy for the Kurdistan Parliament in Exile (Parlamena Kurdistanê li Derveyî Welêt), which met from 1995 to 2000. He was involved in the Preparatory Committee of the Kurdistan National Congress (KNK) and acted as one of its founding members in 1999. Having served on KNK's Executive Council, he remained active in the organization until his death.

Haji Ahmadi was also a member of the Kurdistan Workers' Party (PKK). At the founding congress of the Kurdistan Free Life Party (PJAK) in 2004, he was elected its general chairman. He was said to have coordinated the activities of the PJAK from his exile in Germany between visits to inspect the troops in Iranian Kurdistan. He shared his leadership duties with the female co-chair Evindar Renas.

In the summer of 2007, he visited Washington but, according to the United States government sources, failed to meet with any officials. He had obtained German citizenship by 2008 and resided in Cologne.

In March 2010, Haji Ahmadi was arrested at his residence in Germany by German authorities but was released shortly afterwards. The German government gave no details regarding why he was arrested or released. Before his release, the Iranian government had asked Germany to extradite Haji Ahmadi to Iran. However, Germany refused this request on the grounds that he was a German citizen. In response, Iran's Foreign Ministry spokesman Ramin Mehmanparast told a news conference in Tehran that the decision to free Haji Ahmadi amounted to "practically supporting terrorism", and that "Europe ha[d] become a haven for terrorists."

In 2014, Haji Ahmadi participated in a commemoration of the Armenian genocide held in Brussels, alongside Remzi Kartal, the president of Kongra-Gel.

In 2022, he was involved in the protests over the death of Mahsa Amini (Jîna Emînî) in Iran.

Ahmadi died in Cologne on 18 March 2025, at the age of 84, having lived in Germany for 40 years.
