= Kurdistan Free Life Party =

Political party and militant group in Iran

Kurdistan Free Life Party Partiya Jiyana Azad a Kurdistanê (PJAK) پارتی ژیانی ئازادی کوردستان
- Leader: Peyman Viyan and Emîr Kerîmî
- Founded: 2004; 22 years ago
- Armed wing: Eastern Kurdistan Units (YRK)
- Women's armed wing: Women's Defence Forces (HPJ)
- Ideology: Democratic confederalism
- Political position: Left-wing
- National affiliation: Coalition of Political Forces of Iranian Kurdistan (2026–present)
- International affiliation: Kurdistan Communities Union (KCK)

Flag of the HRK, former name of the armed wing of the PJAK

The Kurdistan Free Life Party, or PJAK (Kurdish: پارتی ژیانی ئازادی کوردستان, romanized: Partiya Jiyana Azad a Kurdistanê), is an armed Kurdish militant group. It has waged an intermittent armed struggle since 2004 against the Iranian Government, seeking self-determination through some degree of autonomy for Kurds in Iran (also known as "Eastern Kurdistan" or "Rojhelat").

The PJAK is aligned with the Kurdistan Workers' Party (PKK) through the Kurdistan Communities Union (KCK), an umbrella group of Kurdish political and insurgent groups in Turkey, Iran, Syria, and Iraq.

PJAK spokespersons have repeatedly told visiting media that its armed wing, the Eastern Kurdistan Units (YRK), has approximately 3,000 active members – half of them women – however estimates from academic specialists over the years point to more conservative figures such as 1,000. However, PJAK's capabilities to inflict significant damage on Islamic Republic of Iran forces in Kurdish areas of Iran has by some accounts been significantly weakened over the past decade, firstly due to a relatively large-scale 2011 cross-border campaign that killed potentially hundreds of PJAK fighters, secondly due to recent increased Turkish-Iranian cooperation through sharing intel (satellite, drone footage) on PKK and PJAK movements in their Qandil Mountains bases. On the other hand, a recent uptick in Iranian Government repression, imprisonment, executions, and extrajudicial killings of Kurdist activists have allegedly caused an increase in recruits to PJAK and the other clandestine anti-IRI Kurdish rebel groups Komala, KDPI, and PAK.

PJAK has been designated as a terrorist organisation by Iran, Turkey, and since 2009, by the U.S. Department of the Treasury.

== Policies, structure, and branches ==
Flag of the Women's Defense Forces

Members of the PKK from Iranian Kurdistan founded the PJAK in 2004 as an Iranian equivalent to their leftist-nationalist insurgency against the Turkish government. It is assumed that the present leader of the organization is Abdul Rahman Haji Ahmadi, who is said to reside in Germany. According to the Washington Times, half the members of PJAK are women, many of them still in their teens. The group actively recruits female guerrillas and states that its "cruelest and fiercest fighters" are women drawn to the movement's "radical feminism".

The PJAK is a member of the Kurdistan Communities Union or KCK (Kurdish: Koma Civakên Kurdistan), which is an alliance of Kurdish groups and divisions led by an elected Executive Council. The KCK is in charge of a number of decisions, and often releases press statements on behalf of its members.

The PJAK also has sub-divisions:

- Armed wing – Eastern Kurdistan Units (Kurdish: Yekîneyên Rojhilatê Kurdistan, YRK), formerly known as the Eastern Kurdistan Forces (Kurdish: Hêzên Rojhilatê Kurdistan, HRK)
- Women's armed wing – Women's Defence Forces (Kurdish: Hêzên Parastina Jinê, HPJ), led by Gulistan Dogan. As of 2020, about half of its militants were women.
- Youth and student branch

According to the New York Times, as of 2007, the PJAK and PKK "appear to a large extent to be one and the same, and share the same goal: fighting campaigns to win new autonomy and rights for Kurds. The only difference is that the PJAK fights in Iran, and PKK fights in Turkey. They share leadership, logistics and allegiance to Abdullah Ocalan, the PKK leader currently imprisoned in Turkey." Although PJAK rejects this accusation, with member of executive council and spokesperson, Rivar Abdanan, stating that “PJAK is an independent Kurdish political party operating in eastern Kurdistan and Iran. The dissolution of the PKK/KCK has no direct connection to PJAK.” within the context of the PKK-Turkey peace process, going on to say that “If the Islamic Republic were to make such a proposal, and if there were genuine preparedness, planning, and serious determination for fundamental change in Iran, and if we found such a process to be compatible with the interests of the Kurdish nation, we would examine it and act in accordance with our own roadmap, plans, and program.”

The PJAK leadership states that the group's goals are principally focused on replacing Iran's theocracy with a federal and democratic government which accepts an autonomy for ethnic minorities in Iran.

PJAK split several times. The first split took place in PJAK in 2005, and members of the split, such as (Osman Jafari, Shiva Kargar, Habib Tahmasabi, Yusuf Hatami and....,) founded the Democratic Union of Kurdistan.

== Armed conflict and arrests ==
Eastern Kurdistan Units Yekîneyên Rojhilatê Kurdistan (YRK)
- Flag of the YRK
- Leader: Abdul Rahman Haji Ahmadi
- Dates active: 2004–present
- Active regions: Iraq, Turkey and Iran
- Ideology: Secularism; Jineology
- Status: Active
- Part of: Kurdistan Workers' Party (PKK)

=== 2004–2010 ===
The Kurdistan Free Life Party, has been engaged in an armed conflict with the Iranian authorities since 2004.

Istanbul's Cihan News Agency claimed that over 120 members of the Iranian security forces were killed by PJAK during 2005.

PJAK killed 24 members of Iranian security forces on 3 April 2006, in retaliation for the killing of 10 Kurds demonstrating in Maku by Iranian security forces. On 10 April 2006, seven PJAK members were arrested in Iran, on suspicion that they had killed three Iranian security force personnel. PJAK set off a bomb on 8 May 2006 in Kermanshah, wounding five people at a government building.

As early as mid-2006, the Iranian security forces have confronted PJAK guerrillas in many occasions along the border inside Iran. Since then, the United States news channel MSNBC claims that the Iranian military has begun bombardments of Kurdish villages in Iraq along the Iranian border while claiming that their primary targets have been PJAK militants. A number of civilians have died. PJAK claims its guerrillas fight inside Iran, and in August 2007, managed to destroy an Iranian military helicopter that was conducting a forward operation of bombardment by Iranian forces.

On 24 April 2009, PJAK rebels attacked a police station in Kermanshah province. According to Iranian government sources, 18 policemen and 8 rebels were killed in a fierce gun battle. Iran responded a week later by attacking Kurdish villages in the border area of Panjwin inside Iraq using helicopter gunships. According to Iraqi border guards officials, the area attacked by Iran was not considered a stronghold of PJAK, that appeared to have been the target of the raid. According to the ICRC, more than 800 Iraqi Kurds have been forced from their homes by the recent cross-border violence.

=== 2011–2012 ===
On 16 July 2011, the Iranian army launched a major offensive against PJAK compounds in the mountainous regions of northern Iraq. According to the Revolutionary Guards dozens of rebels have been killed. According to the state-run Islamic Republic News Agency on 26 July, PJAK militants were killed in clashes in several towns in West Azerbaijan province. Kurdish media reported that at least five Revolutionary Guards were killed.

PJAK spokesperson Sherzad Kemankar announced in an interview with the Iraqi Kurdish newspapers Hawlati and Awene that the Iranian forces attacked PJAK strongholds on July 16, however PJAK succeeded in pushing back the Iranian military to their original positions and 53 Iranian soldiers were killed in the battle while PJAK lost two fighters. Sherzad Kemankar also pointed out that Iranian forces were carrying out a joint operation with Ansar al-Islam using heavy weaponry. Iranian media later reported that General Abbas Asemi, one of the most senior Islamic Revolutionary Guard Corps (IRGC) commanders in the holy city of Qom along with at least 5 other Revolutionary Guard soldiers were killed in clashes with Kurdish rebels near the Iraq border.

The Iranian government blames the PJAK for sabotage attacks on gas pipelines and ambushing its troops, according to Reuters, aid agencies say shelling by the Revolutionary Guard has "killed some civilians and forced hundreds to flee their homes" in the area. The Revolutionary Guard denies the charge.

On 8 August 2011, during a lull for Ramadan in the IRGC offensive, PJAK leader Haji Ahmadi, told an interviewer his group is prepared to negotiate with Iran and maintained that Kurdish issues need to be solved through "peaceful means". Haji Ahmadi acknowledged that in some cases compromise is inevitable and indicated that PJAK is willing to lay down its arms. He said fighting may not help Kurds secure political and cultural rights in Iran. However, the Guards resumed their offensive on September 2 and rejected any ceasefire call by PJAK, saying the Kurdish rebels have no choice but to lay down arms or leave the border areas. On 19 September, Iran's ground forces commander, Brigadier General Ahmad Reza Pourdastan, told the Vatan-e-Emrooz newspaper his forces would finish off armed Kurdish Iraqi-based rebels in the "coming days".

The rejection of ceasefire offer by PJAK led to new skirmishes between the two sides. On 2 September, after a one-month lull in fighting, IRGC began a new round of ground operations against PJAK. On 9 September 2011, Iranian media reported that Brigadier General Abbas Ali Jannesari of the IRGC was killed during a battle with PJAK rebels.

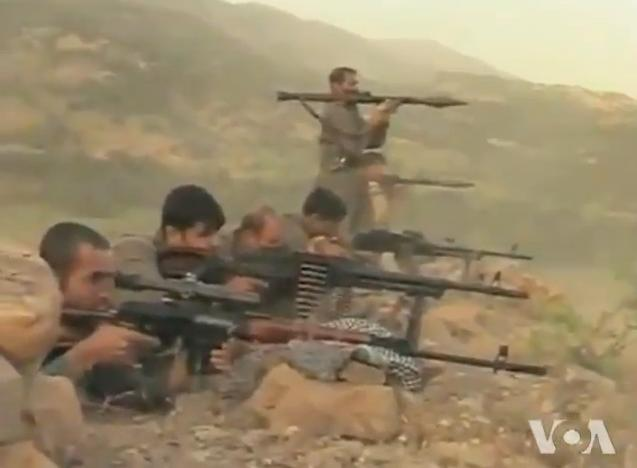
A group of PJAK fighters in 2012

On 30 September 2011, Deputy Commander of the Ground Forces of Iran's IRGC, Brigadier General Abdullah Araqi announced that after the Iranian military captured the Jasosan heights, the PJAK conceded defeat and agreed to retreat one kilometer away from the Iranian border and to refrain from military activities on Iran's soil and recruitment of Iranian nationals. According to Iranian media, 180 PJAK militias were killed and 300 wounded during the last operations seizing PJAK's headquarters in Jasosan heights in the Northwestern border regions of Iran.

On 25 April 2012, Iranian media reported that four members of elite Revolutionary Guards were killed and four others were wounded during an attack by PJAK rebels near Paveh in Kermanshah province in western Iran.

=== 2026 Kurdish–Iranian crisis ===
During the continuation of protests in Iran, PJAK issued a public statement expressing support for strikes and demonstrations by merchants and citizens. In its declaration, the organization attributed Iran's ongoing social and economic crises to long-term state policies of repression, economic mismanagement, and political exclusion. PJAK characterized systemic corruption, the concentration of economic power within security institutions, and regional military involvement as primary causes of economic decline, and emphasized societal solidarity as essential for overcoming what it described as structural crises within the Iranian political system.

PJAK killed 8 IRGC members on January 8, as reported by Fars News Agency.

On 22 February 2026, following the protests, PJAK joined other Iranian Kurdish parties in creating the Coalition of Political Forces of Iranian Kurdistan.

== Designation as a terrorist organization ==
The following countries have listed PJAK as a terrorist organization.

Iran
Turkey

== PJAK and the United States ==
Both the United States and PJAK have always denied any form of ties. Since February 2009, the PJAK is classified as a terrorist organization by the US government, freezing any assets the PJAK has under U.S. jurisdiction and prohibiting American citizens from doing business with the organization. Officials have cited PJAK's connections to the PKK as the basis for this designation—the US has proscribed the PKK as a "Foreign Terrorist Organisation" since 1997 in support of Turkey, a regional ally of the US and fellow NATO member. Iranian media and government figures have frequently charged that PJAK is covertly supported by the United States and its allies in order to undermine Iranian "state power". Iranian officials have also claimed that PJAK attacks come "with the support of America and the Zionist regime" (Israel).

On April 18, 2006, Congressman Dennis Kucinich sent a letter to President George W. Bush in which he expressed his judgment that the U.S. is likely to be supporting and coordinating PJAK, since PJAK operates and is based in Iraqi territory, which is under the control of the U.S. supported Kurdistan Regional Government.

From November 2006 to June 2008, journalist Seymour Hersh maintained that the Bush administration was gearing up for war with Iran, and in November 2006 he wrote in The New Yorker that the US military and Israel are giving PJAK equipment, training, and targeting information in order to create internal pressures in Iran. An Israeli spokesperson immediately denied the claims. Likewise, Ross Wilson, the US ambassador to Turkey at the time, quickly issued an official denial of any kind of American assistance to PJAK in an effort to quell the uproar in Turkey. Wilson also sent a classified cable to Washington in December 2007 (which was later leaked) in which he strongly urged the US government to officially blacklist PJAK.

In the wake of this incident, high-ranking PKK commander Cemil Bayık asserted in an interview with Agence France-Presse that while US officials had made contact with PJAK, America had provided no support whatsoever to the insurgent group. Maintaining that the PKK was the founder and only real supporter of PJAK, Bayık further stated that "if the US is interested in PJAK, then it has to be interested in the PKK as well", which would contradict the established hostility of the US toward the PKK.

In 2007, the Washington Times claimed that Haji Ahmadi, the leader of PJAK, visited Washington, DC in August 2007 in order to seek political and military backing from the US, but only made limited contact with officials and failed to obtain any such support. However, in a statement released on 18 October 2008, PJAK accused the US of having passed intelligence to Turkish and Iranian forces as they conducted intensified bombing campaigns and cross-border attacks against PJAK and PKK bases in the Qandil region.

On 4 February 2009, United States Department of the Treasury designated PJAK as a terrorist organization. Moreover, the former PJAK leader Haji Ahmadi has accused the US of fighting the Kurdish rebels alongside Turkey and Iran.

=== Alleged Turkish–Iranian cooperation ===
In 2011, PJAK leader Rahman Haj Ahmadi, in an interview with the conservative activist Kenneth R. Timmerman, claimed that elements in the units of the Turkish military or Turkish government had deliberately aligned with Iranian forces to suppress the secular PJAK in Iran.
