= List of Kurds =

This is a list of notable Kurds, chronologically listed:

== 6th century-15th century ==
- Jaban al-Kurdi (6th century)
- Bahlool Mahi (9th century)
- Mir Jafar Dasni (d. c. 841)
- Ibn al-Dahhak (d. 927)
- Muhammad ibn Husayn al-Rawadi (d. c. 953–956)
- Muhammad ibn Shaddad (d. 955)
- Daysam ibn Ibrahim al-Kurdi (d. c. 957)
- Evdilsemedê Babek (972–1019)
- Lashkari ibn Muhammad (d. 978)
- Hasanwayh (d. 979)
- Al-Mawardi (974-1058)
- Badr ibn Hasanwayh (r. 979–1013)
- Marzuban ibn Muhammad ibn Shaddad (d. 985)
- Abu Hanifa Dinawari (9th-century)
- Abu Nasr Husayn II (r. 1001–1025)
- Ali Hariri (1009–1079/80)
- Abu’l-Fatḥ Moḥammad b. ʿAnnāz (d. 1010/1)
- Zahir ibn Hilal ibn Badr (r. 1013–1015)
- Hilal ibn Badr (r. 1014)
- Fadluya (r. 1030–1078)
- Fadl ibn Muhammad (d. 1031)
- Abu'l-Fath Musa (r. 1031–1034)
- Lashkari ibn Musa (r. 1034–1049)
- Abu Nasr Mamlan II (r. 1058/9–1070)
- Abu Mansur Wahsudan (d. 1059)
- Abu'l-Aswar Shavur ibn Fadl (d. 1067)
- Anushirvan ibn Lashkari (d. c. 1067)
- Ashot ibn Shavur (r. 1068–1069)
- Manuchihr ibn Shavur (r. 1072–1118)
- Fadl ibn Shavur (d. 1073)
- Fadlun ibn Fadl (r. 1073–1075)
- Badh ibn Dustak (d. 1093/6)
- Fakhr-un-Nisa (11th century)
- Firuz-Shah Zarrin-Kolah (11th century)
- Ibn al-Azraq al-Fariqi (1116–1176)
- Abu'l-Aswar Shavur ibn Manuchihr (r. 1118–1124)
- Fadl ibn Shavur ibn Manuchihr (r. 1125–1130)
- Fakr al-Din Shaddad ibn Mahmud (r. 1131–1155)
- Saladin (1137–1193)
- Al-Adil I (1145–1218)
- Fadl ibn Mahmud (r. 1155–1161)
- Sayf al-Din al-Amidi (1156–1233)
- Shahanshah ibn Mahmud (r. 1164–1174)
- Al-Afdal ibn Salah ad-Din (c. 1169–1225)
- Shirkuh (d. 1169)
- Az-Zahir Ghazi (1172–1216)
- Najm ad-Din Ayyub (d. 1173)
- Sultan ibn Mahmud (r. 1174–1199)
- Al-Ashraf Musa (1178–1237)
- Al-Mu'azzam Isa (1176–1227)
- Al-Kamil (1117–1238)
- Cakir al-Kurdi (d. 1155)
- Turan-Shah (d. 1180)
- Ibn al-Salah (1181–1245)
- Al-Mu'azzam Turanshah ibn Salah al-Din (c. 1181 – 1260)
- Bahramshah (r. 1182–1230)
- Farrukh Shah (d. 1182)
- Muhammad ibn Shirkuh (d. 1186)
- Al-Mansur Nasir al-Din Muhammad (1189– c. 1216)
- Al-Muzaffar I Umar (d. 1191)
- Tughtakin ibn Ayyub (d. 1197)
- Al-Aziz Uthman (d. 1198)
- Al-Mansur I Muhammad (12th century)
- Fakhraddin (12th century)
- Izz al-Din Usama (12th century)
- Masud ibn Namdar (12th century)
- Mehmed Reshan (12th century)
- Nasirdin (12th century)
- Sejadin (12th century)
- Al-Awhad Ayyub (d. 1210)
- Al-Adil II (1221–1248)
- An-Nasir Yusuf (1228–1260)
- Al-Mujahid (d. 1240)
- As-Salih Ayyub (1205–1249)
- An-Nasir Dawud (1206–1261)
- Al-Aziz Muhammad (c. 1213–1236)
- Sitt al-Sham (d. 1220)
- Al-Ashraf Musa, Emir of Homs (1229–1263)
- Dayfa Khatun (d. 1242)
- As-Salih Ismail (d. 1245)
- Al-Mansur Ibrahim (d. 1246)
- Al-Muzaffar Ghazi (d. 1247)
- Ibn al-Hadjib (d. 1249)
- Al-Ashraf Musa, Sultan of Egypt (r. 1250–1254)
- Al-Muazzam Turanshah (d. 1250)
- Fakhr al-Din al-Akhlati (d. 1260)
- Safi-ad-din Ardabili (1252/3–1334)
- Abulfeda (1273–1332)
- Al-Kamil Muhammad (d. 1260)
- Shabankara'i (1298–1358)
- Al-Shahrazuri (13th century)
- Amadin (13th century)
- Husam al-Din Chalabi (13th century)
- Khatuna Fekhra (13th century)
- Saʿd al-Din al-Humaidi (13th century)
- Sheikh Mand (13th century)
- Sheikh Obekr (13th century)
- Zayn al-Din al-Amidi (13th century)
- Sadr al-Din Musa (1305–1391)
- Zain al-Din al-'Iraqi (1325–1404)
- Nusrat al-Din Ahmad (d. 1330)
- Al-Afdal Muhammad (d. 1341)
- Mele Perîşan (1356–1431)
- Sayyid Husayn Ahlati (d. 1397)
- Mela Huseynê Bateyî (1417–1495)
- Izz al-Din Shir (d. 1423)
- Khvajeh Ali Safavi (d. 1427)
- Idris Bitlisi (1457–1520)
- Hosam al-Din Ali Bitlisi (d. 1494/5)
- Mahmud the Kurd (15th century)
- Sultan Sahak (late 14th century to early 15th century)

== 16th century–19th century ==
- Sharafkhan Bidlisi (1543–1603)
- Şêx Şemsedînê Exlatî (1558–1674)
- Abd-al-Baqi Nahavandi (1570–1632)
- Melayê Cizîrî (1570–1640)
- Asenath Barzani (1590–1670)
- Feqiyê Teyran (1590–1660)
- Halo Khan Ardalan (r. 1590–1616)
- Yusuf Yaska (1592–1636)
- Shir Sarim (16th century)
- Ezidi Mirza (1600–1651)
- Ali Janbulad (d. 1610)
- Ibrahim al-Kurani (1615–1690)
- Ganj Ali Khan (d. 1624/5)
- Soleyman Khan Ardalan (r. 1637–1657)
- Shahrokh Sultan Zanganeh (d. 1639)
- Mistefa Bêsaranî (1642–1701)
- Ahmad Khani (1650–1707)
- Ali Mardan Khan (d. 1657)
- Shaykh Ali Khan Zanganeh (d. 1689)
- Ali Beg Zanganeh (17th century)
- Mir Xanzad (17th century)
- Sarı Süleyman Bey (17th century)
- Khana Qubadi (1700–1759)
- Almas Khan-e Kanoule'ei (1706–1777)
- Mohamed Pasha Jaff (b. 1714)
- Karim Khan Zand (1705-1779)
- Shahqoli Khan Zanganeh (d. 1716)
- Sheikh Mullah Yahya Mizouri (1733–1833)
- Marif Nodeyi (1753–1838/9)
- Xelîlê Sêrtî (1754–1843)
- Zaro Aga (1764–1834)
- Al-Barzanjī (d. 1764)
- Khulam Rada Khan Arkawazi (1765–1834)
- Suleiman al-Halabi (1777–1800)
- Khâlid-i Shahrazuri (1779–1827)
- Uthman Sirâj-ud-Dîn Naqshbandi (1781–1867)
- Mohammed el Kebir (1734-1796)
- Muhammad Pasha of Rawanduz (1783–1838)
- Şeyda Hewramî (1784–1852)
- Allahqoli Khan Zanganeh (d. 1785)
- Aziz Khan Mokri (1792–1871)
- Ahmad Bag Komasi (1796–1877)
- Mahmud Bayazidi (1797–1859)
- Yaqub Maydashti (1799–1871)
- Abdullah Pasha Bajalan (18th century)
- Elî Teremaxî (17th century or 18th century)
- Haydar Khan Zanganeh (18th century)
- Ibrahim Pasha al-Dalati (18th century)
- Nalî (1800–1856)
- Salim (1800–1866)
- Bedir Khan Beg (1803–1869)
- Mastoureh Ardalan (1805–1848)
- Mawlawi Tawagozi (1806–1882/3)
- Kurdî (1806/12–1850)
- Jafar Qoli Khan Donboli (d. 1814)
- Haji Qadir Koyi (1817–1897)
- Hasan Ali Khan Garrusi (1820–1900)
- Wali Dewane (1826–1881)
- Mirza Mohammad Reza Kalhor (1829–1892)
- Mahwi (1830–1906)
- Said Pasha Kurd (1834–1907)
- Riza Talabani (1835–1910)
- Mustafa Zihni Pasha (1838–1929)
- Ibrahim Pasha Milli (1843–1908)
- Wafayi (1844–1902)
- Bedri Pasha Bedir Khan (1847–1911)
- Lady Adela (1847–1924)
- Mirza Ebdilqadire Paweyi (1850–1910)
- Abdulkadir Ubeydullah (1851–1925)
- Emin Ali Bedir Khan (1851–1926)
- Diyap Yıldırım (1852–1932)
- Osman Efendîyo Babij (1852–1929)
- Saeb (1854–1910)
- Hariq (1856–1909)
- Mikdad Midhat Bedir Khan (1858–1915)
- Edeb (1860–1918)
- Sabat Islambouli (1860s–1941)
- Shamdin Agha (d. 1860)
- Sheikh Ali Hisam-ad-Din Naqshbandi (1861–1939)
- Seyid Riza (1863–1937)
- Abdürrezzak Bedir Khan (1864–1918)
- Cheragh-Ali Khan Zanganeh (d. 1864)
- Abdulhakim Arvasi (1865–1943)
- Mevlanzade Rifat Bey (1865–1930)
- Sheikh Said (1865–1925)
- Şerif Pasha (1865–1951)
- Ehmedê Xasî (1866/7–1951)
- Haji Mala Saeed Kirkukli Zada (1866–1937)
- Mustafa Yamulki (1866–1936)
- Han Mahmud (d. 1866)
- Piramerd (1867–1950)
- Sabat Islambouli (1867-1941)
- İshak Sükuti (1868–1902)
- Abdullah Cevdet (1869–1932)
- Faramarz Asadi (1869–1969)
- Ibrahim Hananu (1869–1935)
- Süleyman Nazif (1870–1927)
- Hajj Nematollah (1871–1920)
- Kurd Fuad Pasha
- Kurd Ahmet Izzet Pasha (1871–1920)
- Meyan Khatun (1873/4–1957/8)
- Jangir Agha (1874–1943)
- Narî (1874–1944)
- Muhammad Kurd Ali (1876–1953)
- Faik Ali Ozansoy (1876–1950)
- Ibrahim Heski (1877–1931)
- Said Nursî (1877–1960)
- Aziz Feyzi Pirinççizâde (1878–1933)
- Mahmud Barzanji (1878–1956)
- Ahmed Uthman (1879–1946)
- Kâzım İnanç (1880-1938)
- Muhammad Amin Zaki (1880–1948)
- Hasan Hayri (1881–1925)
- Mufti Penjweni (1881–1952)
- Halid Beg Cibran (1882–1925)
- Haji Baba Sheikh (1882–1947)
- Sayed Ali Asghar Kurdistani (1882–1936)
- Süreyya Bedir Khan (1883–1938)
- Sheikh Ubeydullah (d. 1883)
- Celal İbrahim (1884–1917)
- Ali Saip Ursavaş (1885–1939)
- Simko Shikak (1887–1930)
- Halis Öztürk (1889–1977)
- Ferzende (1889–1939)
- Memduh Selim Bey
- Abdul Aziz Yamulki (1890–1981)
- Bakr Sidqi (1890–1937)
- Ekrem Cemilpaşa (1891–1973)
- Taufiq Wahby (1891–1984)
- Hapsa Khan (1891–1953)
- Ihsan Nuri (1892/3–1976)
- Celadet Alî Bedirxan (1893–1951)
- Nuri Dersimi (1893–1973)
- Qazi Muhammad (1893–1947)
- Mohammad Hosni (1894–1969)
- Gholamreza Rashid-Yasemi (1895–1951)
- Kamuran Alî Bedirxan (1895–1978)
- Nur Ali Elahi (1895–1974)
- Ahmed Barzani (1896–1969)
- Sheikh Nuri Sheikh Salih Sheikh Ghani Barzinji (b. 1896)
- Arab Shamilov (1897–1978)
- Husni al-Za'im (1897–1949)
- Ahmed Mukhtar Jaff (1898–1934)
- Qani (1898–1965)
- Rafiq Hilmi (1898–1960)
- Kara Fatima Khanum (19th century)
- Kunj Yusuf Pasha (19th century)
- Osman Pasha Jaff (19th century)
- Hemoye Shero (19th century–1932)
- Usub Bek Temuryan (19th century–1934)
- Yezdanşêr (19th century)

== 20th century ==
=== 1900s–1940s ===
- Abdul Karim Mudarris (1901–2005)
- Muhammad Wali Kermashani (1901–?)
- Cigerxwîn (1903–1984)
- Leyla Bedir Khan (1903–1986)
- Mustafa Barzani (1903–1979)
- Abdullah Goran (1904–1962)
- Ali Merdan (1904–1981)
- Karim Sanjabi (1905–1995)
- Osman Sabri (1905–1993)
- Emînê Evdal (1906–1964)
- Abdolqader Zahedi (1907–2005)
- Alaaddin Sajadi (1907–1984)
- Nado Makhmudov (1907–1990)
- Heciyê Cindî (1908–1990)
- Qanate Kurdo (1909–1985)
- Samand Siabandov (1909–1989)
- Qedrîcan (1911–1972)
- Khalid Bakdash (1912–1995)
- Baba Ali Shaikh Mahmood (1912-1996)
- Mohammad Ghazi (1913–1998)
- Ibrahim Ahmad (1914–2000)
- Ahmed Kuftaro (1915–2004)
- Wansa (1917–2015)
- Dildar (1918–1948)
- Saleh Yousefi (1918–1981)
- Nûredin Zaza (1919–1988)
- Ibrahim Amin Baldar (1920–1998)
- Musa Anter (1920–1992)
- Abdurrahman Sharafkandi (1921–1991)
- Daham Miro (1921–2010)
- Ezaddin Husseini (1921–2011)
- Hassan Zirak (1921–1973)
- Hemin Mukriyani (1921–1986)
- Mustafa Pasha Bajalan (d. 1921)
- Ahmad Hardi (1922–2006)
- Tahir Tewfiq (1922–1987)
- Baba Mardoukh Rohanee (1923–1989)
- Yaşar Kemal (1923–2015)
- Karim Zand (1924–2017)
- Taha Muhie-eldin Marouf (1924–2009)
- Xelîlê Çaçan Mûradov (1924–1981)
- Abdel Hamid al-Sarraj (1925–2013)
- Bülent Ecevit (1925–1006)
- Ghader Abdollahzadeh (1925–2009)
- Mohammad Mamle (1925–1999)
- Siamak Yasemi (1925–1994)
- Karim Hisami (1926–2001)
- Moshe Barazani (1926–1947)
- Ahmed Arif (1927–1991)
- Mehdi Halıcı (1927–2008)
- Muhamad Salih Dilan (1927–1990)
- Shami Kermashani (1927–1984)
- Turgut Özal (1927–1993)
- Akram Hamid Begzadeh Jaff (1929–2010)
- Kâmran İnan (1929–2015)
- Muhammad Said Ramadan al-Bouti (1929–2013)
- Nusrat Bhutto (1929–2011)
- Abdul Rahman Ghassemlou (1930–1989)
- Cemal Süreya (1931–1990)
- Medet Serhat (1931–1994)
- Nadir Nadirov (1932–2021)
- Ordîxanê Celîl (1932–2007)
- Shahab Sheikh Nuri (1932–1976)
- Ahmad Moftizadeh (1933–1993)
- Jalal Talabani (1933–2017)
- Jamal Nebez (1933–2018)
- Khurto Hajji Ismail (1933–2020)
- Tahseen Said (1933–2019)
- Abdülmelik Fırat (1934–2009)
- Efat Ghazi (1935–1990)
- Emerîkê Serdar (1935–2018)
- Mehmed Emîn Bozarslan (1935–2026)
- Adel Karasholi (1936–)
- Ahmad Ghazi (1936–2015)
- Ali Askari (1936–1978)
- Celîlê Celîl (1936–)
- Şakiro (1936-1996)
- Suwara Ilkhanizada (1937–1976)
- Yılmaz Güney (1937–1984)
- Aslan Usoyan (1937–2013)
- Ayşe Şan (1938–1996)
- Fuad Masum (1938–)
- Mahmoud Othman (1938–)
- Mazhar Khaleqi (1938–)
- Sadegh Sharafkandi (1938–1992)
- Şerafettin Elçi (1938–2012)
- Yaşar Kaya (1938–2016)
- Jalal Dabagh (1939–)
- Jamal al Barzinji (1939–)
- Zakia Hakki (1939–2021)
- Mehdi Zana (1940–)
- Sherko Bekas (1940–2013)
- Nozad Saleh Rifaat (1941-)
- Abdul Rahman Haji Ahmadi (1941–)
- Ali Ashraf Darvishian (1941–2017)
- Eskerê Boyîk (1941–)
- Mehmet Ali Birand (1941–2013)
- Tosinê Reşîd (1941–)
- Ahmet Türk (1942–)
- Emre Taner (1942–)
- Yusuf Ekinci (1942–1994)
- Amir Hassanpour (1943–2017)
- Dengir Mir Mehmet Fırat (1943–2019)
- Necmettin Büyükkaya (1943–1984)
- Soad Hosny (1943–2001)
- Tofy Mussivand (1943–2024)
- Idris Barzani (1944–1987)
- Latif Rashid (1944–)
- Mahmoud Ezidi (1944-1979)
- Mahmud Baksi (1944–2000)
- Nawshirwan Mustafa (1944–2017)
- Yitzhak Mordechai (1944–)
- Aref Tayfour (1945–)
- Bahaedin Adab (1945–2007)
- Munzur Çem (1945–2022)
- Mustafa Hijri (1945–)
- Rahmi Saltuk (1945–)
- Rauf Hassan (1945–)
- Rojen Barnas (1945–)
- Abdulla Pashew (1946–)
- Fuad Hussein (1946–)
- Jawhar Namiq (1946–2011)
- Khalil al-Zahawi (1946–2007)
- Masoud Barzani (1946–)
- Mojtaba Mirzadeh (1946–2005)
- Oral Çalışlar (1946–)
- Sedigh Kamangar (1946–1989)
- Şahînê Bekirê Soreklî (1946–)
- Dilshad Meriwani (1947–1989)
- Latif Halmat (1947–)
- Shaswar Jalal Saeed (1947-1978)
- Mehmet Sıraç Bilgin (1944–2015)
- Mohammad Saber Ismail (1947–)
- Reşo Zîlan (1947–)
- Rowsch Shaways (1947–2021)
- Cankurd (1948–)
- Foad Mostafa Soltani (1948–1979)
- Hero Ibrahim Ahmed (1948–)
- İhsan Arslan (1948–)
- Keça Kurd (1948–)
- Mihemed Şêxo (1948–1989)
- Narmin Othman (1948–)
- Omer Fattah Hussain (1948–)
- Abbas Vali (1949–)
- Abdulla Mohtadi (1949–)
- Abdullah Öcalan (1949–)
- Adel Murad (1949–2018)
- Hüseyin Erdem (1949–)
- Kamran Hedayati (1949–1996)
- Mohammad Hossein Karimi (1949–1979)
- Najmiddin Karim (1949–2020)
- Têmûrê Xelîl (1949–)
- Ramzi Nafi (1917–1949)

=== 1950s-1970s ===
- Ahmet Altan (1950–)
- Arsalan Baiz (1950–)
- Behrouz Gharibpour (1950–)
- Hacı Karay (1950–)
- Homayoun Ardalan (1950–1992)
- Hüseyin Kalkan (1950–)
- Nihat Özdemir (1950–)
- Rafiq Sabir (1950–)
- Salaheddine Bahaaeddin (1950–)
- Shahram Nazeri (1950–)
- Abdul Rahman Mustafa (1951–)
- Cemîl Bayik (1951–)
- Ferhad Shakely (1951–)
- Pouran Derakhshandeh (1951–)
- Salih Muslim (1951–)
- Salim Barakat (1951–)
- Abbas Kamandi (1952–2012)
- Ali Haydar Kaytan (1952–)
- Hüseyin Velioğlu (1952–2000)
- Ibrahim Tatlises (1952–)
- İsmail Özden (1952–2018)
- Khalil Rashow (1952–)
- Kosrat Rasul Ali (1952–)
- Leyla Qasim (1952–1974)
- Mahmut Alınak (1952–)
- Mala Bakhtiyar (1952–)
- Mehemed Malmîsanij (1952–)
- Murat Bozlak (1952–2010)
- Omar Hamdi (1952–2015)
- Pîr Xidir Silêman (1952–2021)
- Ali Haydar Yıldız (1953–1973)
- Fawaz Hussain (1953–)
- Hoshyar Zebari (1953–)
- Jalal Barzanji (1953–)
- Mohammad Tofiq Rahim (1953–)
- Mehmed Uzun (1953–2007)
- Mehmet Altan (1953–)
- Orhan Miroğlu (1953–)
- Yekta Uzunoğlu (1953–)
- Murat Karayılan (1954–)
- Najiba Ahmad (1954–)
- Selim Sadak (1954–2026)
- Beytocan (1955–2023)
- Fadıl Öztürk (1955–)
- Hatip Dicle (1955–)
- Hikmet Fidan (1955?–2005)
- Ilana Eliya (1955–)
- Imad Ahmad Sayfour (1955–)
- Mohammed Haji Mahmoud (1955–)
- Nasser Razazi (1955–)
- Orhan Doğan (1955–2007)
- Perwîz Cîhanî (1955–)
- Rohat Alakom (1955–)
- Şivan Perwer (1955–)
- Abdulbaset Sieda (1956–)
- Arjen Arî (1956–2012)
- Cuneyd Zapsu (1956–)
- Lokman Polat (1956–)
- Mahsum Korkmaz (1956–1986)
- Mazlum Doğan (1956–1982)
- Mullah Krekar (1956–)
- Nizamettin Arıç (1956–)
- Musa Farisoğulları (1956–)
- Ahmet Kaya (1957–2000)
- Ali Akbar Moradi (1957–)
- Ciwan Haco (1957–)
- Dana Ahmed Majid (1957–)
- Edip Yüksel (1957–)
- Hesenê Metê (1957–)
- Mustafa Aydogan (1957–)
- Najmadin Shukr Rauf (1957–1985)
- Sırrı Sakık (1957–)
- Zafer Çağlayan (1957–)
- Dilshad Said (1958–)
- Kamal Qadir (1958–)
- Mashaal Tammo (1958–)
- Merziye Feriqi (1958–2005)
- Mostafa Moloudi (1958–)
- Nursel Aydoğan (1958–)
- Osman Öcalan (1958–)
- Serdar Roşan (1958–)
- Seyed Khalil Alinezhad (1958–2001)
- Sherzad Hafiz (1958–)
- Tara Jaff (1958–)
- Bakhtiar Amin (1959–)
- Firat Cewerî (1959–)
- İmam Taşçıer (1959–)
- Müslüm Doğan (1959–)
- Ata Nahai (1960–)
- Barham Salih (1960–)
- Bayan Nouri (1960–)
- Edibe Şahin (1960–)
- Eyaz Zaxoyî (1960–1986)
- Jalal Jalalizadeh (1960–)
- Salih Fırat (1960–)
- Soraya Serajeddini (1960–2006)
- Ali Bapir (1961–)
- Amirkhan Mori (1961–)
- Derwich Ferho (1961–)
- Farhad Pirbal (1961–)
- Guram Adzhoyev (1961–)
- Gültan Kışanak (1961–)
- Hassan Rahmanpanah (1961–)
- Jano Rosebiani (1961–)
- Leyla Zana (1961–)
- Nizamettin Taş (1961–)
- Saeed Farajpouri (1961–)
- Savaş Buldan (1961–)
- Zübeyir Aydar (1961–)
- Abderrahman Sadik Karim (1962–)
- Abdolreza Rajabi (1962–)
- Adham Barzani (1962–)
- Ardeshir Kamkar (1962–)
- Hüseyin Kenan Aydın (1962–)
- Adnan Karim (1963–)
- Adnan Selçuk Mizrakli (1963–)
- Azad Bonni (1963–)
- Gülser Yıldırım (1963–)
- Hülya Avşar (1963–)
- Karim Mohammedzadeh (1963–1990)
- Kayhan Kalhor (1963–)
- Kemal Bülbül (1963–)
- Mariwan Halabjaee (1963–)
- Mohammad Seddigh Kaboudvand (1963–)
- Seyran Ateş (1963–)
- Mahir Hassan (1963-)
- Fatma Kurtulan (1964–)
- Hasan Saltık (1964–2021)
- Huner Saleem (1964–)
- Latif Yahia (1964–)
- Leyla Güven (1964–)
- Mano Khalil (1964–)
- Nazand Begikhani (1964–)
- Şeyhmus Dağtekin (1964–)
- Yüksel Yavuz (1964–)
- Aysel Tuğluk (1965–)
- Ayşe Gökkan (1965–)
- Bekir Bozdağ (1965–)
- Bengi Yıldız (1965–)
- Gurbetelli Ersöz (1965–1997)
- Jan Dost (1965–)
- Abdullah Demirbaş (1966–)
- Bachtyar Ali (1966–)
- Canan Bayram (1966–)
- Diyar Dersim (1966–)
- İshak Sağlam (1966–)
- Mahabad Qaradaghi (1966–2020)
- Muhterem Aras (1966–)
- Nechirvan Barzani (1966–)
- Roya Toloui (1966–)
- Tahir Elçi (1966–2015)
- Yıldız Tilbe (1966–)
- Zekeriya Yapıcıoğlu (1966–)
- Alican Önlü (1967–)
- Helîm Yûsiv (1967–)
- Kajal Ahmad (1967–)
- Mehmet Şimşek (1967–)
- Meral Danış Beştaş (1967–)
- Nadhim Zahawi (1967–)
- Nalin Pekgul (1967–)
- Pervin Buldan (1967–)
- Yılmaz Erdoğan (1967–)
- Ali Atalan (1968–)
- Bejan Matur (1968–)
- Gani Mirzo (1968–)
- Fatih Mehmet Maçoğlu (1968–)
- İbrahim Ayhan (1968–2018)
- Metin Göktepe (1968–1996)
- Xalîd Reşîd (1968–)
- Bahman Ghobadi (1969–)
- Bahoz Erdal (1969–)
- Çağlar Demirel (1969–)
- Dilsa Demirbag Sten (1969–)
- Masrour Barzani (1969–)
- Mohammad Oraz (1969–2003)
- Mustafa Atici (1969–)
- Sevahir Bayındır (1969–)
- Widad Akrawi (1969–)
- Amineh Kakabaveh (1970–)
- Ayhan Bilgen (1970–)
- Ayşe Polat (1970–)
- Besime Konca (1970–)
- Sara Kaya (1970–)
- Sirwan Barzani (1970–)
- Sheikh Zana (1970-2006)
- Tuncer Bakırhan (1970–)
- Ahmet Aslan (1971–)
- Ahmet Aydın (1971–)
- Asya Abdullah (1971–)
- Dilba (1971–)
- Gülnaz Karataş (1971–1992)
- Hasret Gültekin (1971–1993)
- Hozan Canê (1971–)
- Jamil Rostami (1971–)
- Mehmet Rüştü Tiryaki (1971–)
- Osman Baydemir (1971–)
- Selma Irmak (1971–)
- Shahram Alidi (1971–)
- Sibel Yiğitalp (1971–)
- Vian Dakhil (1971–)
- Abdullah Zeydan (1972–)
- Azad Zal (1972–)
- Eros Kurdi (1972–)
- Hamdi Ulukaya (1972–)
- Juwan Fuad Masum (1972–)
- Nurettin Demirtaş (1972–)
- Özcan Deniz (1972-)
- Abdulwahid Muhammed Salih (1973–)
- Azad (1973–)
- Bafel Talabani (1973–)
- Herro Mustafa (1973–)
- Houzan Mahmoud (1973–)
- Kazim Öz (1973–)
- Mehmet Yavuz (1973–2019)
- Saliha Aydeniz (1973–)
- Selahattin Demirtaş (1973–)
- Servet Kocakaya (1973–)
- Şehrîbana Kurdî (1973–)
- Şevval Sam (1973–)
- Choman Hardi (1974–)
- Leyla Birlik (1974–)
- Serhat Baran (1974–)
- Seyed Ali Jaberi (1974–)
- Aynur Doğan (1975–)
- Bedia Özgökçe Ertan (1975–)
- Celal Başkale (1975–2012)
- Farzad Kamangar (c. 1975–2010)
- Faysal Sarıyıldız (1975–)
- Hisham Zaman (1975–)
- Mehmet Ali Aslan (1975–)
- Sadet Karabulut (1975–)
- Sebahat Tuncel (1975–)
- Sevim Dağdelen (1975–)
- Vala Fareed (1975–)
- Ayla Akat Ata (1976–)
- Evrim Alataş (1976–2010)
- Feleknas Uca (1976–)
- Hemin Hawrami (1976–)
- İdris Baluken (1976–)
- Lahur Talabany (1976–)
- Özlem Cekic (1976–)
- Serkan Köse (1976–)
- Zara (Turkish singer) (1976–)
- Arwa Damon (1977–)
- Bekir Kaya (1977–)
- Dilan Yeşilgöz-Zegerius (1977–)
- Gulan Avci (1977–)
- Hişyar Özsoy (1977–)
- Laleh Khadivi (1977–)
- Nisti Stêrk (1977–)
- Omed Khoshnaw (1977–)
- Qubad Talabani (1977–)
- Shibal Ibrahim (c. 1977–)
- Rojda Felat (1977–)
- Birzo Majeed (1978–)
- Blend Saleh (1978–)
- Caucher Birkar (1978–)
- Düzen Tekkal (1978–)
- Firsat Sofi (1978–2020)
- Kurd Maverick (1978–)
- Rojda Aykoç (1978–)
- Shahram Mokri (1978–)
- Shaswar Abdulwahid (1978–)
- Yousif Muhammed Sadiq (1978–)
- Feryal Clark (1979–)
- Mohsen Chavoshi (1979–)
- Rıza Kocaoğlu (1979–)
- Sheikh Ali Ilyas (1979–)
- Zeynel Doğan (1979–)

=== 1980s-2000s ===
- Rojda Demirer (1980–)
- Rewşan Çeliker (1980–)
- Sherko Moarefi (1980–2013)
- Mustafa Sarp (1980–)
- Zuhal Demir (1980–)
- Derya Karadaş (1981–)
- Pervin Chakar (1981–)
- Golriz Ghahraman (1981–)
- Hawar Mulla Mohammed (1981–)
- Khalid Mushir (1981–)
- Khanna Omarkhali (1981–)
- Remziye Tosun (1981–)
- Selçuk Şahin (footballer born 1981)
- Sinan Kaloğlu (1981–)
- Xatar (1981–2025)
- Ebru Günay (1982–)
- Ehsan Fatahian (1982–)
- Fidan Doğan (1982–2013)
- Gökay Akbulut (1982–)
- Jwan Hesso (1982–)
- Majid Kavian (1982–2011)
- Roza Güclü Hedin (1982–)
- Zeynab Jalalian (1982–)
- Behrouz Boochani (1983–)
- Belçim Bilgin (1983–)
- Burhan G (1983–)
- Chopy Fatah (1983–)
- Karzan Kardozi (1983–)
- Mohammedali Yaseen Taha (1983–)
- Salt Bae (1983–)
- Sam Shahidi (1983–)
- Selçuk Şahin (footballer born 1983)
- Shwan Jalal (1983–)
- Sohrab Pournazeri (1983–)
- Taban Shoresh (1983–)
- Zara (Russian singer) (1983–)
- Ali Hama Saleh (1984–)
- Bovar Karim (1984–)
- Dilo Doxan (1984–)
- Evin Incir (1984–)
- Hevrin Khalaf (1984–)
- Hootan Shakiba (1984–)
- Jassim Mohammed Haji (1984–)
- Kawa Hesso (1984–)
- Jwan Yosef (1984–)
- Sherwan Haji (1985–)
- Haftbefehl (1985–)
- Isaac Tutumlu (1985–)
- Sane Jaleh (1985–2011)
- Bengin Ahmad (1986–)
- Dashni Morad (1986–)
- Hanna Jaff (1986–)
- Kadir Talabani (1986–)
- Navid Mohammadzadeh (1986–)
- Rang Shawkat (1986–)
- Ziaeddin Niknafs (1986–)
- Brwa Nouri (1987–)
- Dara Mohammed (1987–)
- Darin (1987–)
- Dilan Gwyn (1987–)
- Leyla İmret (1987–)
- Ömer Öcalan (1987–)
- Rawez Lawan (1987–)
- Voria Ghafouri (1987–)
- Cansu Özdemir (1988–)
- Eren Derdiyok (1988–)
- Halgurd Mulla Mohammed (1988–)
- Mikhail Aloyan (1988–)
- Helly Luv (1988–)
- KC Rebell (1988–)
- Kurdo (rapper) (1988–)
- Leila Mustafa (1988–)
- Lilla Namo (1988–)
- Makwan Amirkhani (1988–)
- Nûdem Durak (1988–)
- Taylan Kurt (1988–)
- Zyzz (1989–2011)
- Bahare Alavi (1989–2011)
- Rezan Zuğurlu (1988/9–)
- Ahmad Al Saleh (1989–)
- Aram Khalili (1989–)
- Deniz Naki (1989–)
- Lawen Redar (1989–)
- Tuğba Hezer Öztürk (1989–)
- Evin Ahmad (1990–)
- Jiloan Hamad (1990–)
- Mervan Çelik (1990–)
- Abraham Hamadeh (1991–)
- Capo (rapper) (1991–)
- Enes Kanter Freedom (1991–)
- Kianoush Rostami (1991–)
- Mizgin (1991–)
- Helin Bölek (1992–2020)
- Alireza Beiranvand (1992–)
- Kaveh Rezaei (1992–)
- Newroz Uysal Aslan (1992–)
- Nur Tatar (1992–)
- Lanja Khawe (1993–)
- Nadia Murad (1993–)
- NOURI (1993–)
- Ramin Hossein-Panahi (1995–2018)
- Reynmen (1995–)
- Mahmoud Dahoud (1996–)
- Zeki Majed (1996–)
- Dersim Dağ (1996–)
- Deniz Undav (1996—)
- Berkin Elvan (1999–2014)
- Eno (rapper) (1997–)
- Fero47 (1998–)
- Naren Briar (1998–)
- Merchas Doski (1999-)
- Dadvan Yousuf (2000-)

== Others ==
- Ahmet Dağtekin
- Ala Talabani
- Arezu Jahani-Asl
- Benazir Bhutto
- Dindar Najman
- Fadhil Omer
- Habibollah Latifi
- Hakki Akdeniz
- Hamdi Ulukaya
- Howar Ziad
- Ibrahim Alizade
- Îlham Ehmed
- Nuriye Kesbir
- Rebwar Fatah
- Riya Qahtan
- Saad Abbas Ismail
- Salt Bae
- Taha Baban

== See also ==
- List of Iranian Kurds
- List of Kurdish musicians
- List of Kurdish scholars
