= Mahabad (disambiguation) =

Mahabad is a city in northwestern Iran.

Mahabad may also refer to:

== Places ==
- Republic of Mahabad, a short-lived, Kurdish state of the 20th century, officially known as the Republic of Kurdistan
- Mahabad County, a county in Iran
- Mahabad, Isfahan, a city in Isfahan Province, Iran
- Mahabad, Yazd, a city in Yazd Province, Iran
- Mahabad, Kerman, a village in Kerman Province, Iran
- Mahabad, Razavi Khorasan, a village in Razavi Khorasan Province, Iran
- Mahabad-e Jadid, a village in Razavi Khorasan Province, Iran
- Mahabad-e Olya, a village in Razavi Khorasan Province, Iran
- Mahabad, Tehran, a village in Tehran Province, Iran
- Mahabad Agricultural Training Camp, in West Azerbaijan Province, Iran

== Other ==
- Mahabad (prophet), a pre-Zoroastrian Prophet
- Mahabad Qaradaghi (b. 1966), Kurdish writer, poet and translator
