= Mahinabad =

Mahinabad (Persian: مهين اباد) may refer to:

- Mahinabad, Hamadan
- Mahinabad, Kerman
