= Kurdish PEN =

Kurdish PEN or the Kurdish Centre of the International PEN (Navenda PEN a Kurd in Kurdish) is a branch of International PEN. It was suggested by Kurdish writer Hüseyin Erdem and voted into existence during International PEN's conference in Cambridge in 1988. Its headquarters are located in Cologne, Germany. The Kurdish PEN Center actively works with Kurdish writers in all parts of Kurdistan to promote the Kurdish language and literature. The Center is headed by Dr. Zaradachet Hajo.

Kurdish PEN publishes research articles related to Kurdish culture in four languages: English, German, Spanish and Kurdish. The Kurdish PEN is also active in Turkey, where it organized a conference on cultural diversity in March 2005 in Diyarbakır. It also encourages writers of International PEN to visit Kurdistan and meet Kurdish writers .

== Founding members ==
1. Mehmed Uzun
2. Hüseyn Erdem
3. Yayla Mönch-Bucak
4. Abdurrahman Nakshabandy
5. Hüseyin Kartal
6. Emine Erdem
7. Haydar Işik
