= Dağtekin =

Dağtekin is a Turkish surname. Notable people with the surname include:

- Ahmet Dağtekin, Turkish politician
- Bora Dağtekin, Turkish-German screenwriter and filmmaker
- Şeyhmus Dağtekin, Turkish writer
