= Mizgin (disambiguation) =

Mizgin is a feminine given name of Kurdish language origin, meaning good news.

- Mizgin (born 1991), stage name of Swedish singer and songwriter Mizgin Demircan,
- Mizgin Ay (born 2000), Turkish sprinter
