= Chulak-e Asali =

Chulak-e Asali چولك اصلي
- Village
- Location within Iran
- Coordinates: 34°14′16″N 48°18′02″E
- Country: Iran
- Province: Hamadan
- County: Nahavand
- Bakhsh: Central
- Rural District: Tariq ol Eslam

Population (2006)
  - Total: 561
- Time zone: UTC+3:30 (IRST)
  - Summer (DST): UTC+4:30 (IRDT)

Chulak-e Asali (Persian: چولك اصلي, also Romanized as Chūlak-e Āṣalī; also known as Chūlak) is a village in Tariq ol Eslam Rural District, in the Central District of Nahavand County, Hamadan Province, Iran. At the 2006 census, its population was 561, in 151 families.

== Notable people ==
- Abd-al-Baqi Nahavandi
