= Hassan Rahmanpanah =

Iranian communist political activist (born 1961)

- حەسەن ڕەحمان پەنا
- Born: 1961 (age 64–65); Saqqez, Iran
- Title: a leader and member of the Central Committee of Komalah (CPI) and the Communist Party of Iran
- Term: 1979–present
- Political party: Komalah (CPI), Communist Party of Iran

Hassan Rahmanpanah (Kurdish: حەسەن ڕەحمان پەنا; born 1961) is an Iranian political activist, communist and a prominent member of both the Central Committee of Komalah (CPI) and the Communist Party of Iran.

== Biography ==
Hassan Rahmanpanah was born in 1961 in the village of Kheydar, 5 km from the city of Saqqez in Kurdistan province. He entered primary school in the same village and studied until the end of elementary school. Then he went to Saqqez to continue his education and lived in this city until the spring of 1979, when he graduated. At that time, due to the Iranian revolution and also the liberation struggles in Iranian Kurdistan, he turned to political activity. He was already familiar with the activities of leftist groups in Kurdistan and therefor from that time, following the publicity of the activities of the Komala Organization, joined this organization and continued his activities with this organization.

== Political Activity ==
Hassan Rahmanpanah has served the Communist Party of Iran and Komala which is the Kurdistan Organization of that party, as a leader and member of the Central Committee, at various times since 1979 February. He is currently a member of the Central Committee of this political party and still active with a communist perspective. He is also one of the communist ideological theorists and writers who has published numerous articles.

Hassan Rahmanpanah as the spokesman and Central Committee member of the Komalah (CPI), in all his interviews with the different news agencies has said the communist group did not believe in armed struggle, but that it still had weapons and military camps to defend itself from the Islamic regime's attacks.
