= Khalil al-Zahawi =

Iraqi Arabic calligrapher

Khalil al-Zahawi (Kurdish: خەلێل زەهاۆی; 1946 – 25 May 2007) was a Kurdish Islamic calligrapher, and one of Iraq’s most prominent calligraphers.

== Life and career ==
An ethnic Kurd and a native of Diyala Governorate, he began studying calligraphy in 1959, and moved to Baghdad in 1963, where he gave his first exhibition in 1965. He later graduated from the Fine Arts Institute of Baghdad, and proceeded to work for the State Directorate for the Plastic Arts in the 1980s. Eventually, he found work as a lecturer at Baghdad University. He lived in eastern Baghdad's Na'eriyah neighbourhood, a predominantly Shi'a area and part of the New Baghdad administrative district. He had received threats before his death, and had been preparing to leave Baghdad for Irbil.

Al-Zahawi was especially active in the 1990s, when he had realized the beauty of calligraphy and taught students from various countries of the Middle East and beyond. He was considered the foremost calligrapher in the Ta'liq method; his style was notable for lengthening individual letters until they appeared as long as words. His textbook of Ta'liq was used in Egypt, Iran, Turkey, and Pakistan as well as in his home country. According to the Sunni Muslim Scholars' Association, he was considered the "sheikh" of Iraqi calligraphers, and only calligraphers who had passed his review could be considered proficient.

On 25 May 2007, al-Zahawi was shot dead by gunmen in an ambush outside his home in the district of Baghdad. His body was returned to his hometown for an Islamic funeral.

== See also ==
- List of Kurds
- Iraqi art
- Islamic art
- Islamic calligraphy
- List of Iraqi artists
