= Xalîd Reşîd =

- Born: 1968 (age 57–58); Slemani, Iraq
- Occupations: Musician, singer, archeologist
- Writing career
- Pen name: Xalîd Reşîd

Xalîd Reşîd (Kurdish: خالید ڕه‌شید, romanized: Xalîd Reşîd); was born in Sulaymaniyah, Iraqi Kurdistan, and currently resides in Stockholm, Sweden. He is recognized as one of the most influential interpreters of Kurdish music academically, with an extended knowledge of Persian and Azerbaijani music. Xalîd Reşîd extensively studied oriental musical instruments such as the balaban, which is widely used in Kurdish folk music, the flutes nây and blûr, the oûd (lute) and various percussion instruments.

He has received two "Stipendiom" awards from the Swedish Ministry of Culture.

He left Kurdistan for Europe in 1980 and took up residence in Sweden. After taking courses in Swedish he joined the fine arts academy and the music department. Then he attended university in Sweden, studying archaeology, obtaining his master's degree in 1991. He has written two books on the archeological sites of Kurdistan.

In 1996 he was elected head of the Kurdish artists congress in Europe and entrusted with the task of forming a national Kurdish orchestra. He started academic studies in music again in 1999, this time in Russia, and recorded some classical Kurdish songs there.

== Works ==
- Eman recorded in 1995 in Germany.
- Gurbet recorded in 1997 in Sweden, Swedish National Council.
- Balaban recorded in 1997 in Paris, France.
- Xelwet recorded in 1998 in Sweden.
- Clasik Mosko recorded in 2002 in Moscow, Russia.
- Eshik Nema recorded in 2004.
- Buki Eware recorded in 2005 in Arbil, Iraq.
- Jiger Koshekem to be recorded in Sulaymaniyah, Iraq
- Kurdish music
- Sulaymaniyah
- List of Kurds
