= Kurdistan Democratic Party (Iran) =

Political party

Coordinates: 36.0644°N 44.6036°E

Kurdistan Democratic Party حیزبی دێموکراتی کوردستان
- Abbreviation: KDP; HDK
- Secretary-General: Abdullah Hassanzadeh (2006–2012) Mostafa Moloudi (2017–2019); Khalid Azizi (2012–2017 and 2019–2022)
- Founded: December 1, 2006; 19 years ago
- Dissolved: 21 August 2022; 4 years ago
- Merger of: Democratic Party of Iranian Kurdistan
- Split from: Democratic Party of Iranian Kurdistan
- Headquarters: Democrat Castle, Koy Sanjaq, Iraqi Kurdistan
- Ideology: Kurdish nationalism Left-wing nationalism
- International affiliation: Socialist International

Party flag
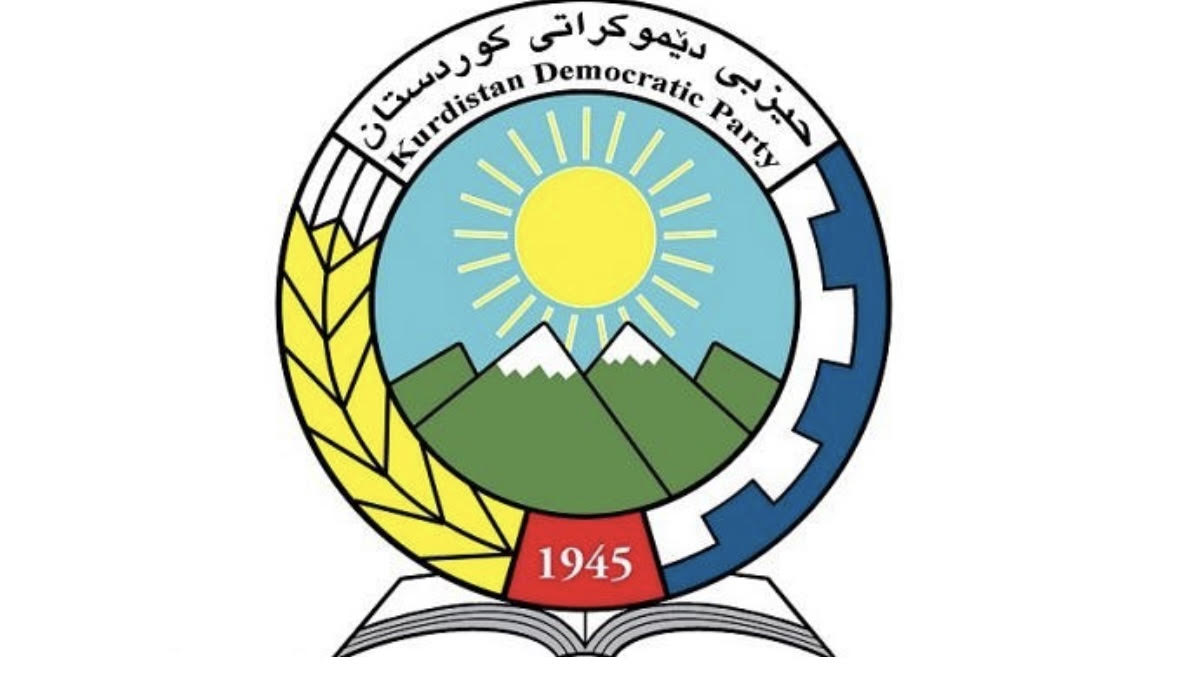

Website
- kdppress.org

The Kurdistan Democratic Party (KDP; Kurdish: حیزبی دێموکراتی کوردستان, romanized: Hizbi Demokrati Kurdistan, abbreviated HDK; Persian: حزب دموکرات کردستان) was an ethnic party of Kurds in Iran, which split from Democratic Party of Iranian Kurdistan (KDPI) in 2006 after a dispute over choosing its next leader in the latter's 13th convention. The KDPI and Iran's Kurdistan Democratic Party (KDP-Iran) have been engaged in several rounds of reunification talks over the years. On August 21, 2022, the two parties announced that they would finally reunite. The first time in 2016, Iranian agents had planted a bomb outside the party headquarters that killed and injured several members. During the same year 2016 several important members got killed during the western Iranian clashes. The second time was in 2018 when the Iranian regime attacked the KDP-I party headquarters with ballistic missiles from Iran to Iraqi Kurdistan where the party headquarters is located.

The party was made a full member of the Socialist International at its November 2015 Council meeting in Luanda, Angola.

== Secretaries-General ==
- Abdullah Hassanzadeh (2006–2012)
- Khalid Azizi (2012–2017)
- Mostafa Moloudi (2017–2019)
- Khalid Azizi (2019–2022)
