= Qomeshah =

Qomeshah قمشه
- Village
- Location within Iran
- Coordinates: 34°15′07″N 47°14′39″E
- Country: Iran
- Province: Kermanshah
- County: Kermanshah
- Bakhsh: Central
- Rural District: Dorudfaraman

Population (2006)
  - Total: 519
- Time zone: UTC+3:30 (IRST)
  - Summer (DST): UTC+4:30 (IRDT)

Qomeshah (Persian: قمشه) is a village in Dorudfaraman Rural District, in the Central District of Kermanshah County, Kermanshah Province, Iran. At the 2006 census, its population was 519, divided between 104 families.
