= Rojda =

Kurdish singer

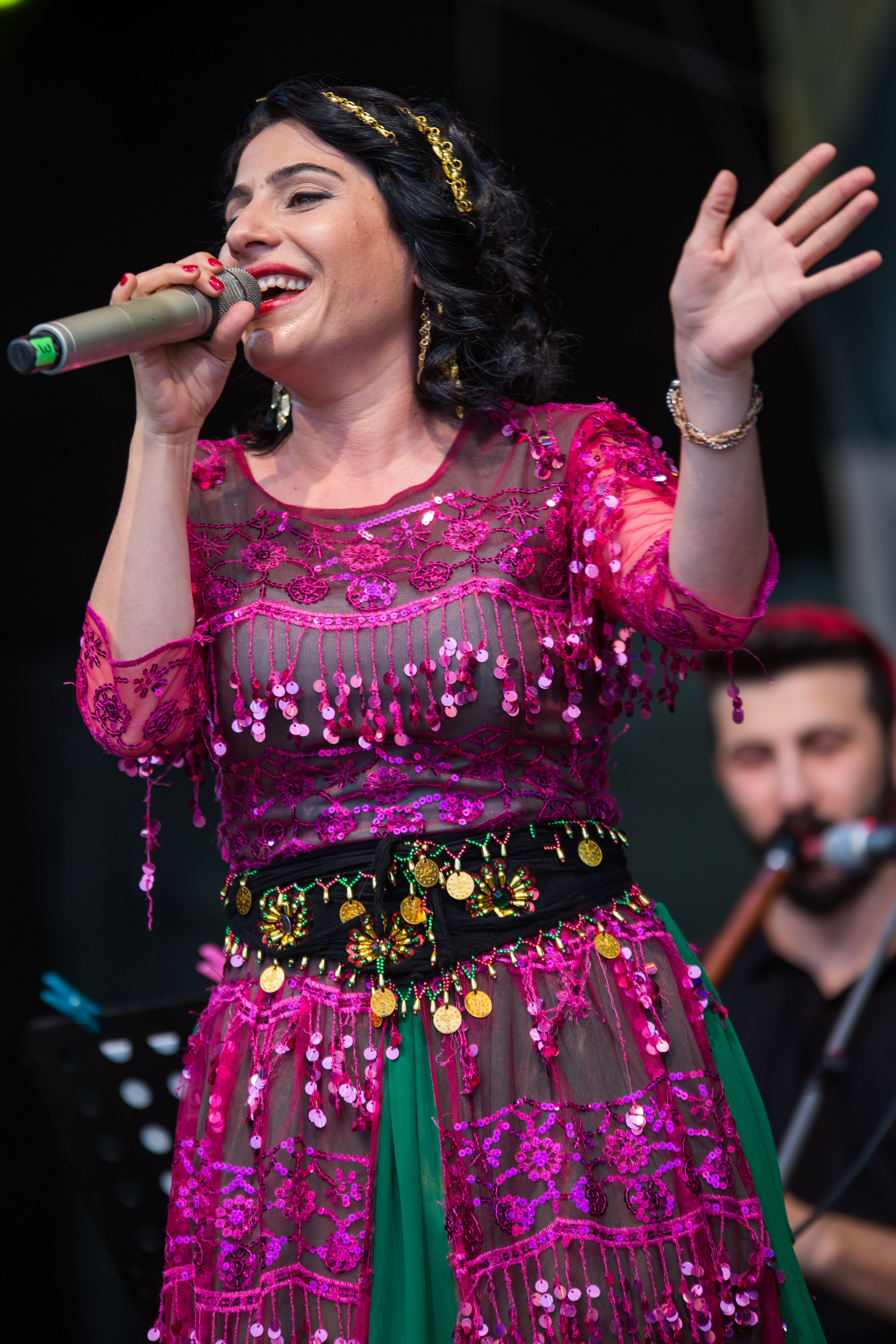

Background information
- Also known as: Rojda Şenses; Rojda Aykoç; Kadriye Şenses
- Born: Kadriye Şenses; 1978 (age 47–48); Tütün, Kurtalan, Siirt, Turkey
- Occupation: Singer

Rojda (born Kadriye Şenses in 1978, also known as Rojda Şenses) is a contemporary Kurdish singer.

== Biography ==
Musician Rojda with her family in Siirt

She was born in the village of Tütün, in the Kurtalan district of Siirt province, Turkey. After finishing primary school, she moved to Istanbul in 1991 and began working and singing in local music bands along with her brother Çiya. From 1991 she began working with the group Koma Gulên Xerzan, and from 1993 with Navenda Çanda Mezopotamya (Mesopotamia Cultural Center). In 1997 she worked with an 11-woman group Koma Asmîn. Her first solo album was Sebra Min, released in 2006. In her music, she has been influenced by several famous Kurdish singers, including Karapetê Xaço, Meyremxan, Ayşe Şan and Merzîye Rezazî. She has held many concerts in the UK, Germany, Italy, and Austria.

On 20 February 2010, Rojda was among a group of 160 Turkish artists invited to Istanbul to meet with Prime Minister Recep Tayyip Erdoğan and discuss his government's "Kurdish opening" initiative, but she did not attend the meeting because of her arrest.

Her singing style has been described as "traditional melismatic" whose "arrangements are sparse and 'primitive' rather than glossy" pop.

In September 2013, she accompanied Osman Baydemir and Layla Zana in the Diyarbakir Culture Days festival in Austria and gave a performance at the Vienna City Hall in which she expressed hope for a peaceful and democratic solution of the Kurdish problem in Turkey. She has also taken part in the first Kurdish performance of Hamlet in Diyarbakır in 2012.

=== Name change ===
In 2004, the singer officially changed her name from Kadriye Şenses to Rojda, a Kurdish name, following significant democratic strides in Turkey. She had previously used the name informally but had refrained from formalizing it due to apprehensions about potential political interpretations. Rojda stated that she had contemplated the name change five years earlier but had hesitated due to lack of courage. She attributed her newfound resolve to the positive developments in Turkey's democratic landscape.

== 2010 arrest ==
In 2009 as part of the "Diyarbakır Culture and Arts Festival" held in Diyarbakir from 27 to 30 May 2009, Rojda sang a Kurdish folk song titled "Heval Kamuran". The Diyarbakir Public Prosecutors Office later filed a lawsuit against the artist accusing her of "spreading propaganda for an illegal organization". On 9 February 2010 she was arrested at her home in Istanbul and detained in custody at the Istanbul Police Directorate until 11 February when she was taken to the Istanbul 13th High Criminal Court, charged, and released several hours later.

On 25 March, the Diyarbakır 4th High Criminal Court sentenced her to a one-year and eight-month prison sentence for "spreading propaganda for a terrorist organization". The state prosecutor had demanded a five-year prison sentence under article 7/2 of the "Anti-Terror Act", citing as a reason some of the lyrics of the song and that some people in the audience had been seen displaying banners of the outlawed organization Kurdistan Workers' Party (PKK).

Some commentators linked her prosecution, and similar prosecutions, to a backlash against the lifting of restrictions in Turkey that had forbidden the broadcast of languages other than Turkish.

== Album discography ==
- Ji Bîr Nabin, Koma Xerzan, 1997
- Sonda Me, 1997
- Rûkena Min, 2005
- Sebra Min, 2006
- Mem û Zîn
- Şahiya Stranan
- Şevbuhêrka Dengbêjan, Roj TV
- Hat, 2011
- Stranên Bijartî, 2012
- Kezi, 2014
- Bazın, 2020
