= List of ambassadors of Iraq to China =

Coordinates: 39.912046°N 116.438196°E

Ambassador of Iraq to the People's Republic of China
- Incumbent; Shorsh Khalid Said since April 14, 2021
- Inaugural holder: Abd al-haq Fadil
- Formation: 1960

The Iraqi ambassador in Beijing is the official representative of the Government in Baghdad to the Government of China.

== List of representatives ==
Diplomatic agrément/Diplomatic accreditation	ambassador	Observations	Prime Minister of Iraq	Premier of the People's Republic of China	Term end
August 25, 1958		establishing diplomatic relations	Abd al-Karim Qasim	Zhou Enlai	
1960	Abd al-haq Fadil		Abd al-Karim Qasim	Zhou Enlai	1963
1963	Abdul Muttalib Hameen		Ahmad Hasan al-Bakr	Zhou Enlai	1966
1966	Munir Rashid		Naji Talib	Zhou Enlai	1967
1970	Monther Abdul Hamid Eraim		Ahmed Hassan al-Bakr	Zhou Enlai	1972
1972	Mawlud Kamil Abid		Ahmad Hasan al-Bakr	Zhou Enlai	1973
May 27, 1973	Falih A. Razzak Al-Sammarraie		Ahmad Hasan al-Bakr	Zhou Enlai	1976
1977	Issa Salman Hamid		Ahmad Hasan al-Bakr	Hua Guofeng	1979
1980	Badri Karim Khadhim		Saddam Hussein	Zhao Ziyang	1983
October 1983	Rashid al-Rifai		Saddam Hussein	Zhao Ziyang	July 1985
1986	Muhammad Amin al-Jaff	He joined the Foreign Service in 1979 after 25 years with economic and industrial governmental organizations, and a few months later he was posted as Ambassador to Japan.; from March 1980 till January 1986 he was ambassador in Tokyo.; After the Invasion of Kuwait the Chinese Vice Foreign Minister Yang Fuchang summoned the Iraqi and Kuwaiti ambassadors, one after the other, to receive China's demand for swift Iraqi withdrawal and resolution of the territorial dispute by negotiations, he told ambassador Mohammed Amin al-Jaff that China regretted the invasion.	Saddam Hussein	Zhao Ziyang	1991
March 29, 1994	Bassam Salih Kubba	On June 12, 2004 he was Iraq's Deputy Foreign Minister when he was shot in northwest Baghdad.	Saddam Hussein	Li Peng	2000
2002	Osama B. Mahmoud		Saddam Hussein	Zhu Rongji	2003
2006	Rahman Louan Mohsen	Chargé d'affaires	Nouri al-Maliki	Wen Jiabao	
2007	Mohammad Sabir Ismail		Nouri al-Maliki	Wen Jiabao	2008
September 3, 2010	Abdul-Karim H. Mostafa		Nouri al-Maliki	Wen Jiabao	August 2016
March 17, 2017	Ahmad T. A. Berwari		Adil Abdul-Mahdi	Li Keqiang	August 2020
April 14, 2021	Shorsh Khalid Said		Mustafa Al-Kadhimi	Li Keqiang	
