= Hozan Canê =

German-Kurdish singer

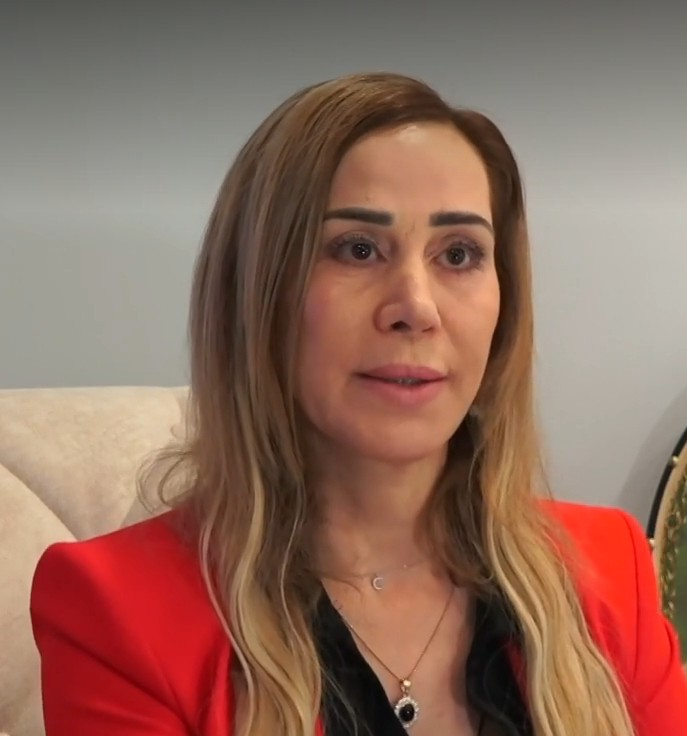
- Born: Saide Inaç; 1971 (age 54–55); Karayazı in Erzurum, Turkey
- Occupations: Singer, activist
- Known for: Kurdish music, imprisonment in Turkey

Hozan Canê (born Saide Inac in 1971) is a contemporary German-Kurdish singer, who is famous for her contributions to Kurdish music.

== Life ==
She was born in the region of Karayazı in Erzurum province, Turkey. After elementary school, she moved to Adana and Istanbul to continue her studies. Then she attended ASM and Arif Sag music schools and studied singing under the supervision of Ferqîn Şiyar and Kazim Bora for three years. Since childhood, Canê listened to music programs broadcast by Kurdish radio in Yerevan, Armenia and was influenced by renowned singers such as Ayşe Şan and Meryem Xan.

During the 1980s and 1990s, Kurdish culture was repressed in Turkey. Canê was arrested, imprisoned and tortured many times by the Turkish police. She was arrested in a concert in Van in 1991 and imprisoned for nine months. She was again assaulted and shot three times by unknown gunmen after attending a concert for the Democracy Party. After these incidents, she fled Turkey and sought refuge in Germany where she has worked with Akademiya Cand û Hunera Kurdî (Academy of Kurdish Culture and Arts) and released several albums.

In 2017, Canê appeared in a video criticising the imprisonment of Kurdish politician Selahattin Demirtaş by the Turkish government. She stated that "We condemn the mentality that calls the will of 6 million people 'terrorist'".

In 2018, Canê was campaigning for the HDP party in Edirne province, near to where HDP leader Selahattin Demirtaş was imprisoned. She was arrested on 22 of June 2018 on terrorism charges, being accused of membership of the PKK Kurdish militia. A Twitter post she had made about her film The 74th Genocide in Sinjar which she directed and acted in was also suggested to be terrorism propaganda. The film is about the genocide of Yazidis by ISIS in Iraq's Shingal region. In the tweet she is seen next to Kurdish fighters. On 14 November 2018 she was sentenced to 6 years and 3 months in prison. She was convicted of 'membership of a terrorist organisation' but acquitted on other charges of sedition and insulting Mustafa Kemal Atatürk, the founder of modern Turkey. She was detained in the women's prison in Istanbul's Bakirköy district. She was released from prison on the 30 September 2020, but not allowed to exit Turkey. Her daughter Gönül Örs is also accused of terrorism and in Turkey.

On 18 Oct 2021 a court in Edirne sentenced Canê to three years, one month and 15 days in prison for allegedly supporting the PKK. Content on her Facebook and Twitter accounts, as well as her music videos has considered among the reasons for this sentence by the Turkish court.

In March of 2023, Canê was a keynote speaker at the 67th Commission on the Status of Women.

== Discography ==
=== Albums ===
1. Rê Waye, lê lê lê Dayê, Ataman Music
2. Hozanê Kurdî
3. Eşqa Welat, Kom Muzîk, Germany, 2000.
4. Wezîrê Min, D&D Sound Production GbR.
5. Dîlana Dila, Mîr Muzîk, 2005.
6. Vegere, Kom Muzîk and Play Sound, France, 2006.
