= Sabat Islambouli =

First licensed female doctor in Syria

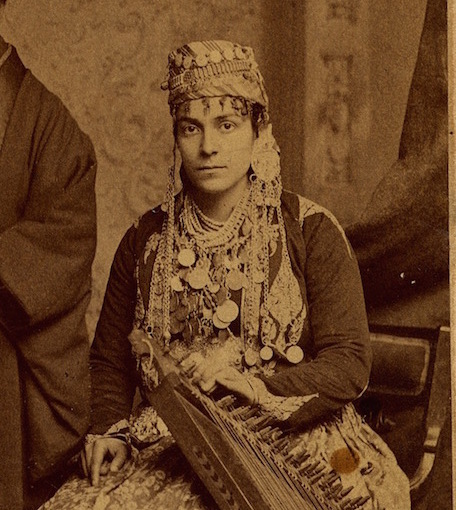
- Born: 1867
- Died: 1941 (aged 73–74)
- Education: Woman's Medical College of Pennsylvania
- Occupation: Physician

Sabat M. Islambouli (1867–1941) was a physician, of Kurdish Jewish heritage. Born in Ottoman Syria, she is the first known female physician from Syria under Ottoman rule. She has had variations of the spelling of her name, and is also known as Sabat Islambooly, Tabat Islambouly, Tabat Istanbuli, Thabat Islambooly, and more.

== Medical training ==
Islambouli was born to a Kurdish Jewish family. She studied at the Woman's Medical College of Pennsylvania in the US starting in 1885. She graduated with her medical degree in 1890.

== Later life ==
Islambouli is believed to have gone back to Damascus after she graduated, and then to Cairo in 1919 according to the college's alumnae list. After that, the college lost touch with her. Little is known of what happened to her once she left the United States. She died in 1941.
