= Hariq =

Kurdish poet

Hariq or Hariqi (1856-1909) (Kurdish:Herîq or Herîqî) is the pen name of Mala Saleh the classic Kurdish poet.

== Life ==
He was born in Ziwyie (a village near Suleimanieh). He studied the Fiqh and Islamic Sciences in his home town, Penjwen and Mukriyan. Then became one of the disciples of Naqshbandi tariqa. He passed out and buried in Mahabad.

== Hariq's poetry ==
Hariqi has written lyric and mystic poems in Kurdish and Persian. The bulk of his poems are in the form of ghazal. He is most influenced by Nalî, Mawlawi Tawagozi, among Kurdish poets.
