= Bedia Özgökçe Ertan =

Kurdish politician and lawyer

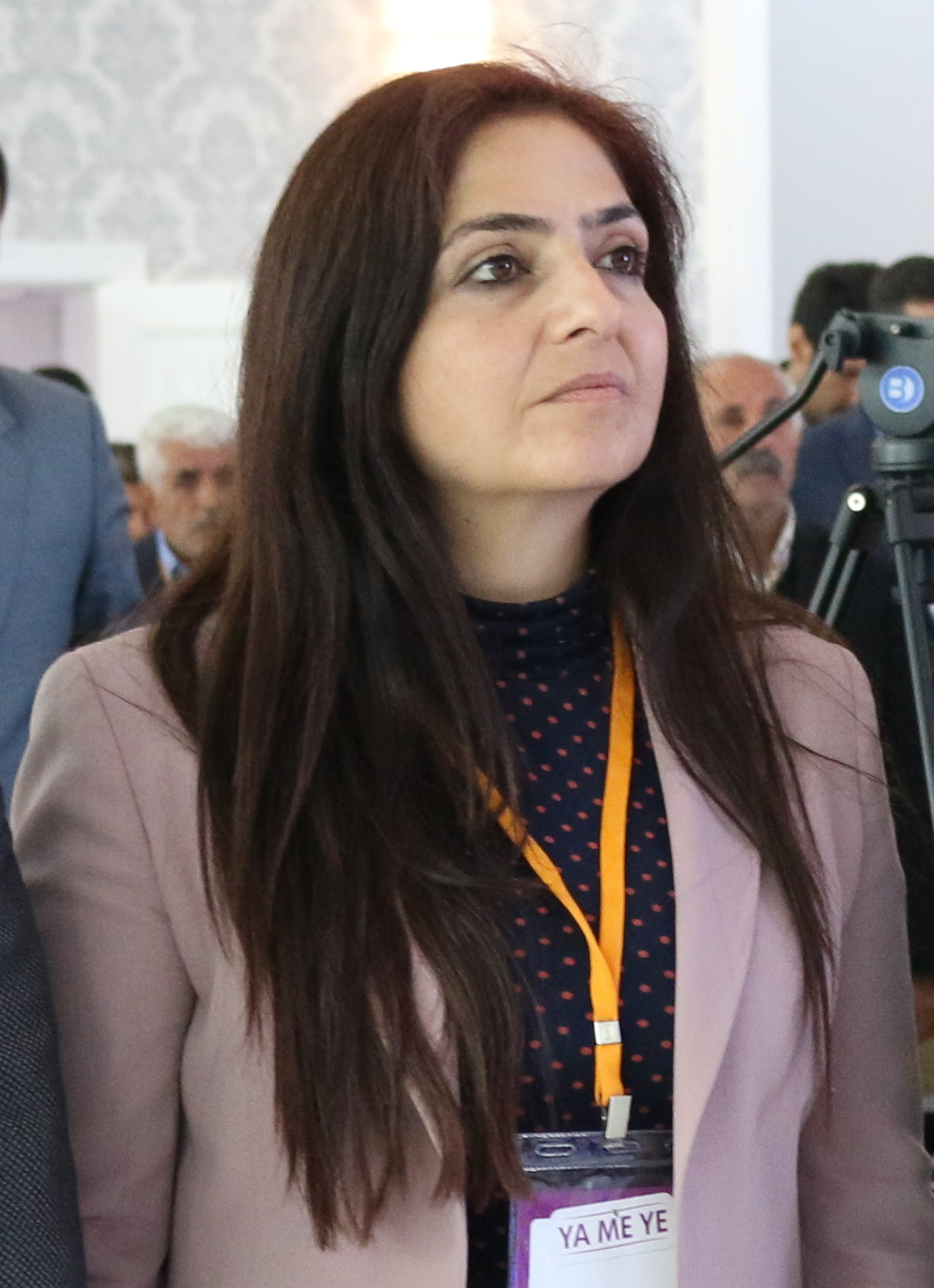
- Bedia Özgökçe Ertan at a congress in Diyarbakır in 2019

Member of the Grand National Assembly
- In office 17 November 2015 – 11 April 2019
- Constituency: Van (Nov 2015, 2018)

Mayor of Van
- In office 11 April 2019 – 19 August 2019
- Preceded by: Mehmet Emin Bilmez
- Succeeded by: Mehmet Emin Bilmez

Personal details
- Born: 6 January 1975 (age 51) Van, Turkey
- Citizenship: Turkish
- Education: Dokuz Eylül University

Bedia Özgökçe Ertan (born 6 January 1975 in Van) is a Northern Kurdish lawyer and a politician of the Peoples' Democratic Party (HDP), a former member of the Turkish Grand National Assembly and Mayor of Van.

== Education and professional career ==
After her graduation from the Law Faculty of the Dokuz Eylül University in Izmir, she began to be involved as a defender of human rights at the Van branch of the Turkish Human Rights Association (IHD) and also the Van Bar Association.

== Political career ==
In the local elections of 2004 she was elected to the municipal council of Van and represented the Democratic Peoples' Party (DEHAP). In the parliamentarian elections of November 2015, she was elected as a Member of Parliament for Van representing the HDP. She opposes war and was charged of "disseminating terror propaganda" for social media posts which opposed to the Turkish military operation in Afrin, Syria in March 2018. In the parliamentarian elections of June 2018 she was re-elected as a Member of Parliament for Van representing the HDP. She was a member of the Plan and Budget Commission and NATO Parliamentary Assembly (NATOPA) Turkish Group. During her political career she was charged seven times with making propaganda for a terrorist organization, but was not sentenced for it. She was elected a board member of the Progressive Alliance (PA), an association of progressive and social democratic parties in November 2019.

=== Mayor of Van ===
In the local election of March 2019, Özgökçe Ertan was elected Mayor of Van. On the 19 August 2019, she was dismissed from her office together with the Mayor of Diyarbakir, Adnan Selçuk Mizrakli and the Mayor of Mardin, Ahmet Türk. The Turkish Interior Minister Süleyman Soylu alleged the mayors had illegally supported the Kurdistan Workers' Party (PKK) and their dismissal was in line with Art. 127 of the Turkish constitution. The protests which arose were dispersed with water cannons by the Turkish police. In October 2019 a judge accepted an indictment for Özgökçe Ertan, and prosecuted her for being a "member of an armed terror organization". She is facing a prison term of 30 years.

After her dismissal, Parliamentary Group of the European United Left–Nordic Green Left in the European Parliament condemned the treatment of the Kurdish mayors by the Government of the Justice and Development Party (AKP) headed by President Recep Tayyip Erdogan.

=== Exile ===
In November 2020, it was reported that she was now living in exile in Greece and that Frank Mentrup, the Mayor of Karlsruhe, supported her emigration to Germany as Turkey invalidated her Turkish passport.

== Personal life ==
She is married and has three children.
