= Mahabad-e Olya =

Mahabad-e Olya مهابادعليا
- Village
- Location within Iran
- Coordinates: 34°06′04″N 58°48′52″E
- Country: Iran
- Province: Razavi Khorasan
- County: Gonabad
- Bakhsh: Kakhk
- Rural District: Kakhk

Population (2006)
  - Total: 62
- Time zone: UTC+3:30 (IRST)
  - Summer (DST): UTC+4:30 (IRDT)

Mahabad-e Olya (Persian: مهابادعليا, also Romanized as Mahābād-e ‘Olyā; also known as Mahābād-e Bālā) is a village in Kakhk Rural District, Kakhk District, Gonabad County, Razavi Khorasan Province, Iran. At the 2006 census, its population was 62, in 22 families.
