= Mohammedali Yaseen Taha =

- محه‌مه‌دعه‌لی یاسین تاها
- In office November 06, 2013 – November 06, 2018

Personal details
- Born: 11 February 1983 (age 43) Tabriz, Iran
- Party: Kurdistan Democratic Party (KDP)
- Education: University of Lisbon, Institute of Social Sciences (ICS) PhD in Comparative Politics

Mohammedali Yaseen Taha (Kurdish: محه‌مه‌دعه‌لی یاسین تاها; born 1983) is a Kurdish politician, academic, poet and media strategist. He currently serves as Advisor to the Prime Minister of the Kurdistan Region of Iraq and Director of the Media and Communication Unit at the Prime Minister’s Office. Previously, he was a Member of the Kurdistan Parliament during its fourth term and held the position of Vice President at Nawroz University.

His multifaceted career spans journalism, academia, and literature. He has taught as a university lecturer, published poetry and short stories, and contributed to intellectual life in Kurdistan through his writing and research. He is also an Associate Researcher at the Institute of Social Sciences (ICS), University of Lisbon and the Founding President of the Open Think Tank in the Kurdistan Region of Iraq.

== Early life ==
Taha was born on February 11, 1983, in Tabriz, Iran, where his family had fled to as political refugees after the 1975 Algiers Agreement between Iran and Iraq and the collapse of Kurdish revolutionary movement Iraqi–Kurdish conflict led by Mustafa Barzani. He is fluent in six languages, Kurdish, Persian, Turkish, Azeri, English, and a basic knowledge of Arabic and Portuguese.

He returned to Iraq with his family in 1995 after the 1991 Uprising of the Kurds in the North of Iraq and the establishment of a de facto autonomy in Kurdistan Region of Iraq. In 2001 he started to work with local newspapers and magazines as a reporter and later as an editor. He holds a Bachelor of Arts in English language and literature from the University of Duhok in 2007. He obtained his master's degree in peace and conflict studies from the University for Peace in San Jose, Costa Rica. Later, he went to Lisbon, Portugal, where he concluded PhD degree in comparative politics from the University of Lisbon.

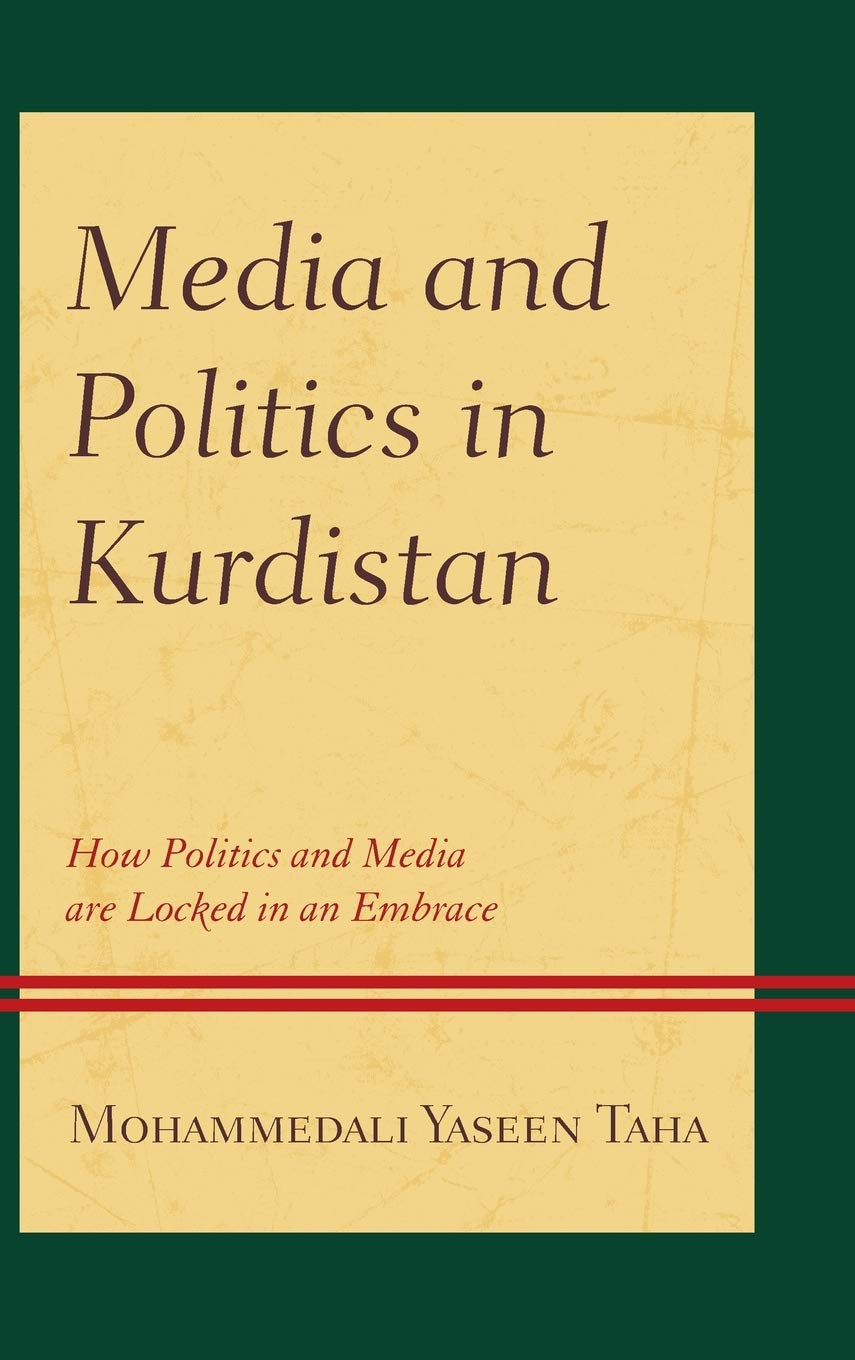
Media and Politics in Kurdistan: how politics and media are locked in an embrace, Mohammedali Yaseen Taha, 2020

== Published books ==
Taha's first poetry collection “Dîsan Bê Te” was published in 2009, second book “Hevwexerê Bayi” in 2012 and “3 Tablo” in 2016. He has also published short stories in various literary publications in Kurdistan region. His is the author of the academic book Media and Politics in Kurdistan: How Politics and Media are Locked in an Embrace (Rowman and Littlefield Publishers, Lexington Books, 2020).

== Political career and election to Kurdistan Parliament ==
Taha, as an active member of KDP since 1998 worked in different party organizations such as Kurdistan Students Union and KDP first branch in Duhok. In September 2013, he run for the parliament election with the Kurdistan Democratic Party and he won the elections and became member of Kurdistan Parliament. He was then elected by the fraction as a member of the KDP fraction's presidency board and also the official spokesperson of the fraction in the parliament.
