= Haydar Khan Zanganeh =

Haydar Khan Zanganeh was a Zand official of Kurdish origin. He belonged to the Zanganeh tribe, a Kurdish tribe native to Kermanshah. He served in high-offices under the Zand ruler Karim Khan (r. 1751-1779), and was twice sent as a diplomat to the important Ottoman city of Baghdad.

== Sources ==
- Fisher, William Bayne; Avery, P.; Hambly, G. R. G; Melville, C. (1991). The Cambridge History of Iran. Vol. 7. Cambridge: Cambridge University Press. ISBN 0521200954.
