= Rahmi Saltuk =

Kurdish singer (born 1945)

Rahmi Saltuk (born in 1945 in Tunceli) is a Turkish Kurdish singer. After having made his name singing in Turkish, his 1989 album Hoy Nare was the first Kurdish album to obtain the approval of the Turkish Ministry of Culture, although the approval was reversed a few weeks later and not lifted till 1992.

== Discography ==
- Yenice Yolları
- Terketmedi Sevdan Beni
- Dosttan Dosta (1, 2 and 3)
- Açılın Kapılar Şaha Gidelim
- Acıyı Bal Eyledik
- Dostlara Çağrı
- Hoy Nare 1989
- Hani Kurşun Sıksan Geçmez Geceden
- Elde Hüzün Kaldı
