= Mohammad Saber Ismail =

Iraqi Kurdish diplomat and politician

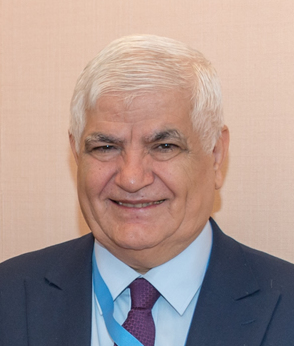

Permanent Representative to the United Nations Office at Geneva
- In office 2013–2016

Personal details
- Born: 1 July 1947 (age 78)
- Party: Patriotic Union of Kurdistan

Dr. Mohammad Saber Ismail (born 1 July 1947) is an Iraqi Kurdish diplomat and politician from the Patriotic Union of Kurdistan. He was Iraq's Permanent Representative to the United Nations in Geneva from 2013 to 2016. He was nominated by the PUK in August 2018 as their candidate to succeed Fuad Masum as President of Iraq.

== Background ==
Ismail graduated from the University of Baghdad in 1969 with a degree in Physics. He worked for over 20 years as a university researcher and professor, receiving a doctorate from Stockholm University in nuclear physics in 1988. He is married to the sister-in-law of the late President of Iraq and founder of the PUK, Jalal Talabani. His brother, Izzat Ismael, is a member of the Iraqi Kurdistan Parliament.

== Political career ==
Ismail served as a representative of the Kurdistan Regional Government in France from 1993 to 2001 and in the United States from 2001 to 2004.

Ismail was the Iraqi Ambassador to China from 2004 to 2010. On his return to Iraq, he became the head of the Asia and Australia Department at the Ministry of Foreign Affairs. He was appointed Permanent Representative to the United Nations in Geneva in 2013 and continued until 2016. During this time he was President of the Conference on Disarmament.
