= Blend Saleh =

Kurdish pop singer (born 1978)

- Born: Blend Saleh; September 21, 1978 (age 46); Kurdistan, Iraq

Blend Saleh, born September 21, 1978, is a Kurdish pop singer.

== Biography ==
Blend was born in Anbar (Ramadi), Iraq, on September 21, 1978. His parents were forced to live there for political reasons. After a couple of months, Blend and his family moved back to Hawler, Kurdistan. In Hawler, he grew up with his parents, two sisters, and a brother. His father originally came from Zaxo and his mother from Shaqlawe.

The first time Blend performed live was at the age of six. It was in Hawler at school where the show was being shot by the Kurdish Kirkuk television. He sang a song in Bahdini and another one in Sorani. At age eight, he was recommended to start playing an instrument by Kurdish singer Tehsin Teha. Violin was the instrument of choice for Blend, and he started taking lessons. He also started participating in local bands at age eight.

In 1991, he and his family moved to Sweden. This was an opportunity for Blend to increase his musical experience and train on violin. At this point, Blend started entering various Swedish youth orchestras. However, he afterwards started working with other Kurdish artists, mainly in Sweden, as a violinist and a composer.

Being interested in science, Blend moved to Uppsala in 2000 after high school to study pharmacy at the Uppsala University. He is now a graduate pharmacist.

His debut album Berivan was released on March 15, 2002. Songs like "Pemekene" and "Berivan" had music videos attributed to them.

In 2005, Blend’s second album was released, titled "Lê Canê". It consists of songs in Sorani dialect and Kurdmanji. On this album, Blend made instrumental versions of songs because he wanted to maintain his interest in playing violin.
