= Saeb (poet) =

Kurdish poet

Ahmed Mala Qader or Saeb (سائیب in Kurdish), (c. 1854 – 1910), was a Kurdish poet. Saeb was born in Sulaymaniyah in the Ottoman Empire.

Writing primarily in the Sorani dialect, he is recognized as a contributor to the 19th-century Kurdish literary renaissance, a movement that elevated vernacular Kurdish to a sophisticated literary medium alongside Persian and Arabic.

== Early life and education ==
Born around 1854 in Sulaymaniyah (modern-day Iraq), Ahmed Mala Qader was raised in the cultural aftermath of the Baban Emirate. His title "Mala" (Mullah) indicates a family lineage rooted in religious scholarship. He received a traditional Islamic education in the local madrasas, which were then regional hubs for theology, logic, and classical literature.

Saeb was a polyglot, proficient in Kurdish, Arabic, and Ottoman Turkish. His education was deeply influenced by the Sufi orders prevalent in Kurdistan at the time, particularly the Qadiriyya and Naqshbandiyya, which provided the mystical and philosophical foundations for much of his later work.

== Literary Career and Style ==
Saeb’s career unfolded during the Tanzimat era of Ottoman reforms and the subsequent Hamidian period. While many of his original manuscripts have been lost to history due to regional instability, he is historically documented as a significant figure in the Sorani school of poetry.

His work followed the classical traditions of the ghazal and qasida, often blending spiritual Sufi themes with observations on nature and the social upheavals of his time. He was a contemporary of other major Kurdish literati such as Mahwi and Haji Qadir Koyi. Unlike the more overtly nationalist Koyi, Saeb is often associated with the introspective and lyrical style pioneered by Nalî, focusing on the preservation of Kurdish cultural identity through poetic excellence.

== Legacy and Death ==
Saeb died in 1910 in his birthplace of Sulaymaniyah, just years before the collapse of the Ottoman Empire and the subsequent partitioning of the region. Though he remains less widely known than some of his contemporaries, he is cited in various Kurdish literary encyclopedias and remains a symbol of the resilience of Kurdish literature during a period of imperial centralization and cultural transition.
