= Mufti Penjweni =

Kurdish poet

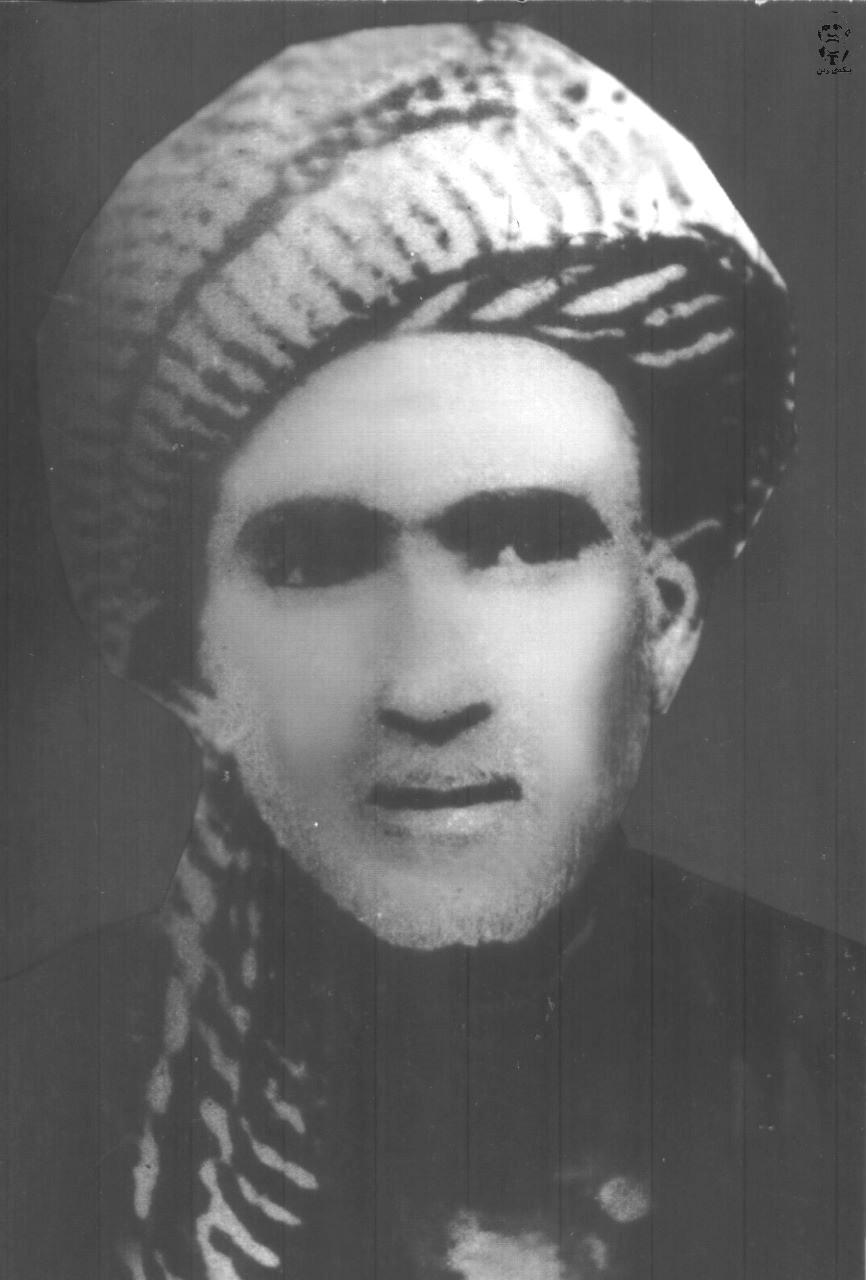
Mufti Penjweni

Mala Abdullah Tutonji or Mufti Penjweni (موفتی پێنجوێنی in Kurdish), (1881 – 1952), was a Kurdish poet. Mufti was born in Penjwen in Iraqi Kurdistan.
