= Cheragh-Ali Khan Zanganeh =

Qajar governor of Isfahan from 1851 to 1855

Cheragh 'Ali Khan Zanganeh
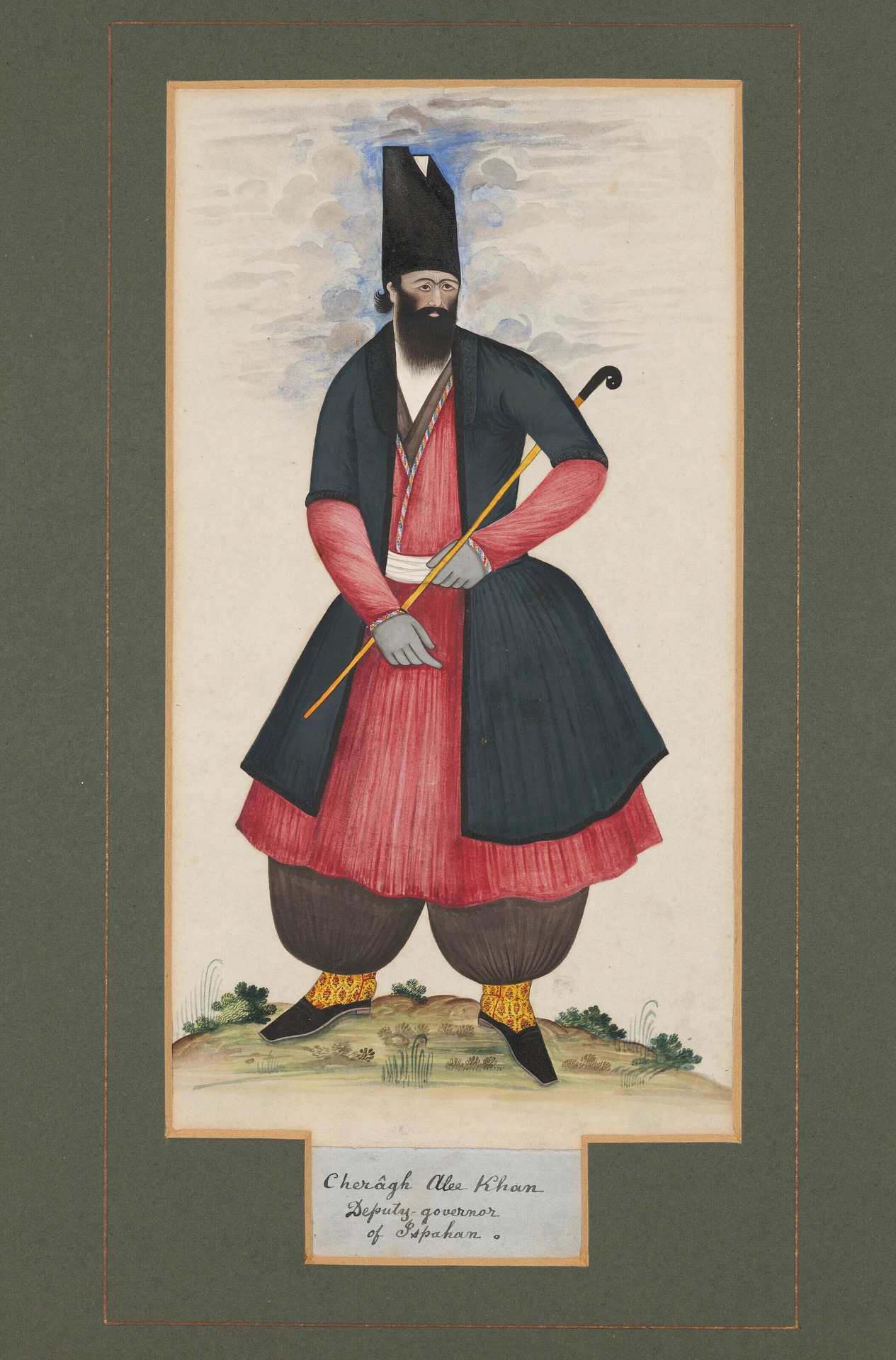
- Cheragh 'Ali Khan Zanganeh, Qajar Iran, 19th century

Governor of Isfahan
- In office 1851–1855
- Monarch: Naser al-Din Shah Qajar
- Preceded by: Unknown
- Succeeded by: Unknown

Personal details
- Died: Unknown

Military service
- Allegiance: Qajar Iran

Cheragh-Ali Khan Zanganeh (Persian: چراغ‌علی‌‌خان زنگنه: died after 1864/5) was a prominent Iranian statesman during the early reign of the Qajar shah Naser al-Din Shah Qajar (r. 1848-1896).

== Biography ==
A member of the Kurdish Zanganeh tribe, Cheragh-Ali Khan started his administration career as a secretary (monshi) in the provincial management of Azerbaijan. He was a representative of the Iranian embassy at the Erzurum consultation of 1843, and later joined the retinue of the prominent chief minister Amir Kabir after the enthronement of Naser al-Din Shah in 1848. Cheragh-Ali Khan was one of the many officials who supported Amir Kabir's governmental reforms.

Cheragh-Ali Khan received his first important task in the same year, when he was appointed mediator in a strife between the vizier of Isfahan and a contender for the post. In 1855 he was given the authority to arrest the perpetrators of the murder of Abbasqoli Khan Pesyan, who was the governor of Bastam. He was shortly after appointed as the governor of Khamsa and Zanjan, which he would govern until he was the given the honorific of "Seraj al-Molk" in 1859/60. In the following years he occupied the office of beglerbeg and ra'īs-e dīvān-khāneh of Isfahan (1862/3-1864/5), and subsequently ra'īs-e eḥteṣāb of the Iranian capital of Tehran. He thereafter disappears from mention—his date of death is thus unknown.

== Sources ==
- MacEoin, Denis M. (1991). "ČERĀḠ-ʿALĪ KHAN SERĀJ-AL-MOLK ZANGANA". Encyclopaedia Iranica, Vol. V, Fasc. 3. pp. 263–264.
