= Mostafa Moloudi =

Mustafa Mauludi

Personal details
- Born: 1958 (age 67–68) Naghadeh, Iran
- Party: Democratic Party of Iranian Kurdistan
- Other political affiliations: Kurdistan Democratic Party (2006-2022)

Mustafa Mauludi is a Kurdish politician and the ex-leader of Kurdistan Democratic Party (Iran). He was selected as leader by central committee of KDP (Iran) on 15 January 2017 after resignation of Khaled Azizi.

== Early life and education ==
He was born in 1958 from Naqadeh, a city of West Azerbaijan province. He graduated in Law from the university of Koya.

Party political offices
Preceded by Khalid Azizi	Secretary-General of the Kurdistan Democratic Party; 2017–2019	Incumbent
