= Mahmud the Kurd =

15th-century Kurdish artist

Mahmud the Kurd (also Mahmud al-Kurdi, Master Mahmud, Kurdish: Mehmûdê Kurdî) was a 15th-century Kurdish artist, craftsman and designer of the late medieval era.

== Life and work ==
Mahmud is regarded as one of the founders of an artistic style which is termed Veneto-Saracenic (Venetian-Islamic) by art historians.

Mahmud's work include several stylistic sub-groups, which have in common the frequent use of European shapes combined with a new style of linear silver inlay displaying an unconventional style of arabesque. Their decoration displays affinities with that on metalwork made during the same period for the Timurid dynasty in Central Asia and eastern Iran and the Mamluk rulers of Egypt and Syria. According to Tahera H. Tajbhai "his skillful designs makes his style immediately recognizable, signaling him out as one of the leading Veneto-Saracenic craftsmen. His style adopted new innovative style whilst still retaining elements of Mamluk tradition."

The location of Mahmud's workshop is disputed. It is believed that he immigrated to Venice where he lived and set up a workshop in the second half of the 15th century and introduced oriental metalwork into Venice. However, some scholars have questioned the thesis that Muslim artists have worked in Venice, they suggest that they produced their objects in their home countries and exported them to Europe. Therefore, there are two more alternative theories proposed based on Mahmdu's style of work, some scholars suggest that his work is originated from Aq Qoyunlu lands in eastern Anatolia or western Iran, while others argue that there is no visual evidence for a connection between the Veneto-Saracenic and Iranian or Aq Qoyunlu homologues, and they place his work in Mamluk Sultanate in Egypt or Syria.

Only 13 objects, 12 of which carry his full name and one without his nisba (the Kurd), have survived. They are preserved in the British Museum, The Victoria and Albert Museum in London, and the Hermitage Museum in St. Petersburg. He usually signed his name on his pieces in Arabic and Latin script as "mu'allim mahmud al kurdi", which means master Mahmud the Kurd.

== Gallery ==
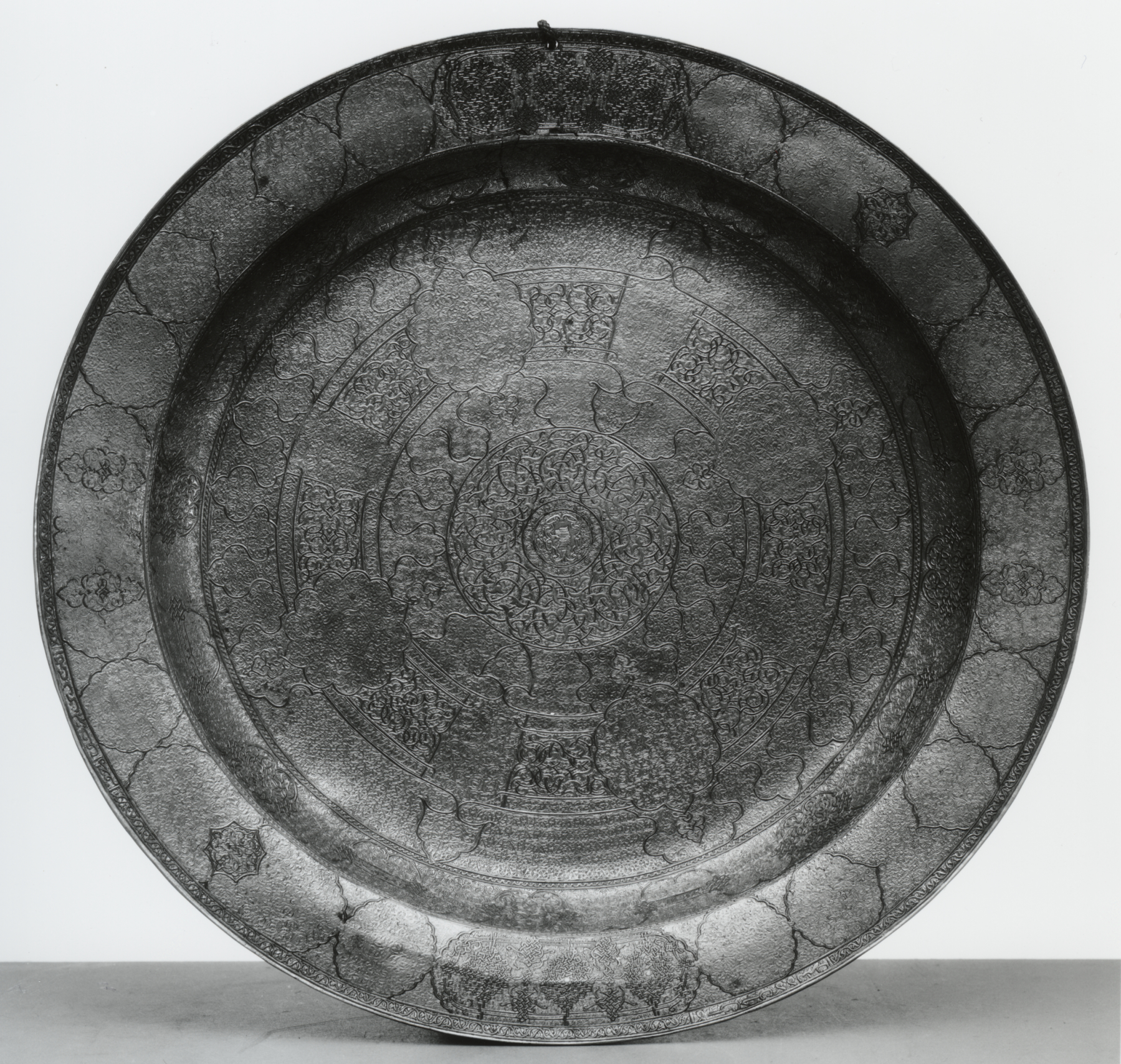
Mahmud the Kurd- Tray (Salver)

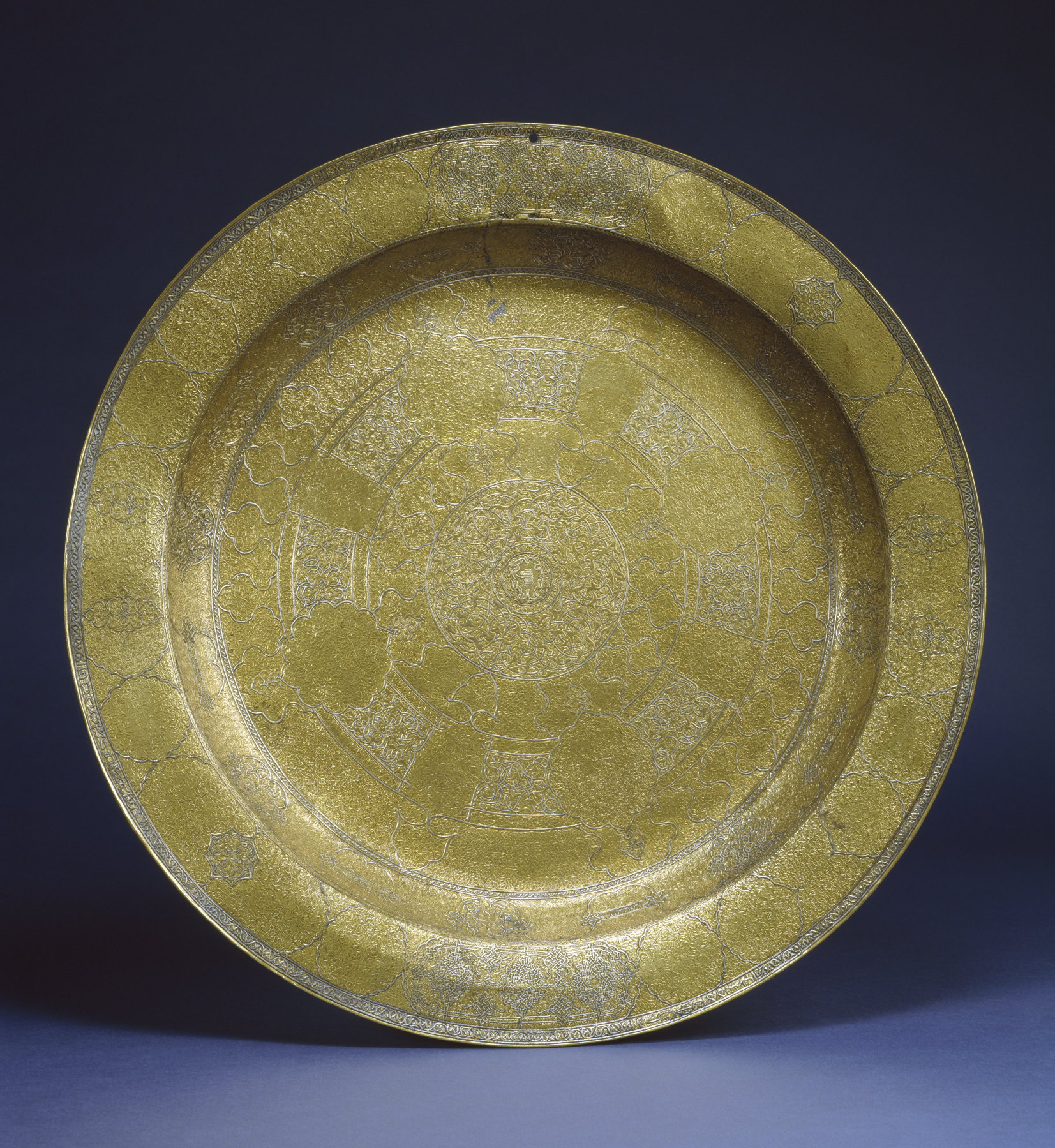
Mahmud the Kurd - Tray (Salver)
