= Newroz Uysal Aslan =

Turkish politician (born 1992)

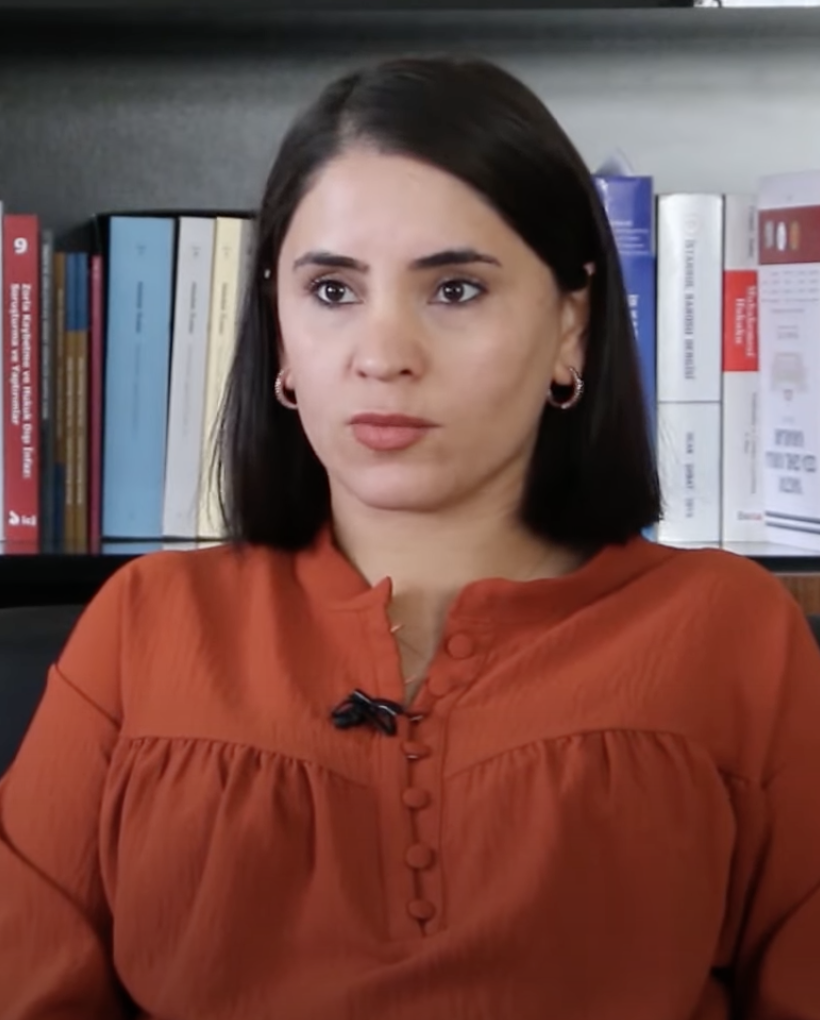

Newroz Uysal Aslan (1992, Kemerli, Turkey) is a lawyer and a politician of the Green Left Party (YSP). In May 2023 she was elected into the Grand National Assembly of Turkey, representing Şırnak for the YSP.

== Early life and education ==
Newroz Uysal Aslan was born in 1992 in Kemerli in the province of Sirnak. She and her family were expelled from their village and they then settled first to Sirnak and then to Cizre. Her mother's wish for Abdullah Öcalan to be free influenced her to become a lawyer. She graduated from the faculty of law from the Istanbul University in 2014.

== Professional career ==
Her first experiences as a lawyer she received while defending the victims of the curfew in the province of Sirnak in 2015. She joined the Asrin Law Office and became a member of the Lawyers for Freedom Association (Turkish: Özgürlük için Hukukçular Derneği, ÖHD). She is known for her defense of Abdullah Öcalan, the former and imprisoned leader of the Kurdistan Workers' Party (PKK).

=== Prosecution ===
Newroz Uysal Aslan was investigated for her involvement in the Democratic Society Congress (DTK). In 2022, the prosecution demanded up to 15 years, but she was acquitted in April 2023. During her trial she was charged with having participated in a WhatsApp group in which human rights violations during the curfews in Sirnak were discussed, participated in reunions of the DTK. One of her lawyers was arrested and replaced by the Nihat Eren, the president of the Bar Association of Diyarbakir.

== Political career ==
For the 2023 Turkish parliamentary election, Newroz Uysal Aslan was presented as the number one candidate in her electoral district in April 2023. In May, she was elected into the Grand National Assembly of Turkey representing Sirnak for the YSP.
