= Haji Mala Saeed Kirkukli Zada =

Kurdish politician (1866–1937)

Haji Mala Saeed (1866–1937) was a Kurdistan politician who represented Sulaimaniyah City. He was a member of parliament, and was appointed as Minister of Justice in the Kurdistan Kingdom.
