= Abd-al-Baqi Nahavandi =

Iranian poet and historian

Abd-al-Baqi Nahavandi (born; Julaq, Nahavand, 1570 – died c. 1632 in India) was a Kurdish noble, historian and biographer of the Safavid Iran and later the Mughal dynasty.

== Biography ==
Abd-al-Baqi was born in Julaq near Nahavand, Safavid Iran in 1570, on land that his ancestors were given by Ismail I. His father Khaja Aqa Baba was a poet who went under the pen name Modreki and who was appointed vizier and nazer of Hamadan, while his brother Aqa Kezr was appointed vazir for Lahijan and later vazir and dewan of Hamadan. Abd-al-Baqi held himself positions in Hamadān, Semnan, Bestam, Deylaman, Lahijan, Yazd, and Abarkuh and later as a revenue officer in Kashan. After the death of his brother, Abd-al-Baqi was appointed vizier of Hamadan but ultimately fled Iran because people tried to turn the Shah against him. Having heard about the approaching army of Abdul Rahim Khan-i-Khanan admirably when he was Kasan, he travelled to Khandesh around year 1614. Khan-i-Khanan welcomed him; gave him the position of revenue assignment; and entrusted him to write memoirs, lineage and the history of the empire. This oeuvre Maʾāṯer-e Raḥīm was finished in 1616. Until 1619, Abd-al-Baqi remained as amin of Deccan and Berar. He died in 1632.
