= Kheydar =

Kheydar خيدر
- Village
- Location within Iran
- Coordinates: 36°11′21″N 46°15′08″E
- Country: Iran
- Province: Kurdistan
- County: Saqqez
- Bakhsh: Central
- Rural District: Tamugheh

Population (2006)
  - Total: 252
- Time zone: UTC+3:30 (IRST)
  - Summer (DST): UTC+4:30 (IRDT)

Kheydar (Persian: خيدر) is a village in Tamugheh Rural District, in the Central District of Saqqez County, Kurdistan Province, Iran. At the 2006 census, its population was 252, in 52 families. The village is populated by Kurds.
