= Nado Makhmudov =

Nado Makhmudov Նադո Մախմուդով Nadoyê Xudo Maxmedov
- Nado Makhmudov
- Born: January 1, 1907; Gharanlugh (now Martuni), Armenia
- Died: 1990; Armenia
- Education: Yerevan State University
- Occupations: writer, public figure
- Spouse: Emma Makhmudova (nee Nalbandian)
- Children: Donara Makhmudova, Dolores Makhmudova, Saladin Makhmudov
- Writing career
- Language: Kurdish, Armenian, Russian
- Subject: history

Nado Khdoi Makhmudov (Armenian: Նադո Խդոի Մախմուդով, Kurdish: Nadoyê Xudo Maxmedov) (1907–1990) was a Kurdish writer and public figure of the Soviet Union.

== Biography ==
=== Early years ===
Nado Makhmudov was born on January 1, 1907, in the village of Gharanlugh, now Martuni, in Armenia. Nado's mother, Tare, was of noble birth. She came from the family of a wealthy Kurdish landowner (bey) but, due to an illness that disfigured her face, she was forced to marry a shepherd named Khdo. After losing his father at the young age of 10, Nado became a duazho (a shepherd's aid) in order to feed his mother and his little sister, resulting in a difficult childhood.

While Nado's dream was to become an educated person, he was instead forced to tend the cattle from morning to night and work in the house of a wealthy landlord. In exchange for his work and obedience, Nado was permitted to sit in the corner of the room during the private lessons of the landlord's son, and follow along. This way the little duazho learned to read and write, and came closer to realizing his dream of getting an education.

In the aftermath of the Russian Revolution it became possible for young, talented and active men of the people, be it a Kurd or an Armenian, to receive a free education. Makhmudov was an active member of a working youth organization, so he received the opportunity to study in Alexandropol (now Gyumri) in the High (Communist) Party School. He graduated from the Transcaucasian Party University and from the High Party School in Moscow. In addition to his Party education, Nado also received a university education and graduated from the History department of the Yerevan State University.

=== Career ===
Through the 1920s and until the very end of his life, Makhmudov lead an active political and social life, holding numerous high governmental positions: he was the head of several regions of Armenia during different periods of time. He was the minister of the municipal economy and head of the cotton trust of Armenia, as well as the deputy minister of transport. He was elected several times as a deputy to the legislatures of the USSR and Armenia. For his great achievements and contributions, he received high national awards.

Throughout his life Nado Makhmudov acted for the good of his Kurdish people as well. He played a leading role in the establishment of Kurdish schools, a Kurdish newspaper (Ria Taza), Kurdish broadcasting on Armenian radio, and in the development of Kurdish culture and literature. In addition, he was focused on the strengthening of Armenian-Kurdish literary and social ties. Delving deeply into questions of the past and present of Kurdish people, he published articles in various newspapers and magazines about issues that concerned his compatriots. While in the USSR, Mustafa Barzani expressed a wish to meet him. Their meeting took place in Armenia, at Makhmudov's home.

=== Literary works ===
Makhmudov was not only a statesman and a public figure but a writer as well. In 1959 Makhmudov published his monograph "Kurdish People", about the history of the Kurdish people beginning with their ancient history and leading up to the present. This monograph remains an important source for orientalists. Makhmudov is also an author of numerous stories, tales, essays and memoirs, which were published in Kurdish, Armenian and Russian. They were warmly received by readers from Armenia, as well as those outside of the country. Among Makhmudov's friends were distinguished Armenian writers and poets such as Avetik Isahakyan, Derenik Demirchian and Nairi Zarian.

== Honours and awards ==
- Order of the Red Banner of Labour (No. 7168, 01.12.1940)
- Order of the Badge of Honour (No. 41887, 20.02.1941)
- Order of the Badge of Honour (No. 480815, 05.10.1966)
- Medal "For the Defence of the Caucasus" (III No. 015765, 09.07.1945)
- Medal "For Valiant Labour in the Great Patriotic War 1941-1945" (A No. 289646, 22.02.1946)
- Jubilee Medal "Thirty Years of Victory in the Great Patriotic War 1941-1945" (1976)
- Jubilee Medal "Forty Years of Victory in the Great Patriotic War 1941-1945" (01.10.1985)

== Books ==
- The History of Kurdish People (Kurd Zhogovurde), Yerevan 1959.(in Armenian)
- Stories, Yerevan 1964. (in Kurdish)
- The Little Duazho (Pokrik Duazhon), Yerevan 1965. (in Armenian)
- Partridge Heart, Yerevan 1968. (in Armenian)
- The Argument of Rivers. Patridge Heart, Yerevan 1970. (in Kurdish)
- Extinguished Houses Lit (Marats Ojakhnere Tskhatsin), Yerevan 1971. (in Armenian)
- The Little Duazho, Moscow 1974. (in Russian)
- In Native Places (Harazat Vayrerum), Yerevan 1978. (in Armenian)
- Unforgettable Meetings, Yerevan 1987. (in Armenian)
- Bahar, Temure Khalil with Nado Makhmudov, Yerevan 1989

== Short stories ==
- The White Rider (Spitak Dziavore), Yerevan, The Literary Newspaper (Grakan Tert), 19 June 1964.(in Armenian)
- The Stork and The Thievish Cat (Aragiln u Gokh Pison), Yerevan, The Pioneer Appeal (Pioner Kanch), 3 March 1966.(in Armenian)
- The Living Witness (Kendani Vkan), Egypt, The Sun Magazine (Arev), 10 and 11 February 1966.(in Armenian)
- The Beasts of Prey (Khischniki), Yerevan, Komsomolec Newspaper, 1967.(in Russian)
- How I Lost The Ability to Speak (Te Inchpes Lezus Kap Enkav), Tbilisi, The Evening Tbilisi (Erekoyan Tbilisi),1968.(in Armenian)
- My First Teacher (Moya Pervaya Uchitelnica), Yerevan, The Literary Armenia (Literaturnaya Armeniya), 1970 #11.(in Russian)
- The Bells are Humming (Kolokola Gudyat), Yerevan, The Literary Armenia (Literaturnaya Armeniya), 1972. (in Russian)
- Mame and Gule (Mame i Gule), Yerevan, The Literary Armenia (Literaturnaya Armeniya), 1974 #2.(in Russian)
- The Grandfather and His Grandchildren (Papikn u Torniknere), Yerevan, The Spring Magazine (Garun), 1974 #2.(in Armenian)
- Two Stories About Jogurt (Erku Arkac Macuni Masin), Yerevan, The Spring Magazine (Garun), 1975 #11.(in Armenian)
- The Legend of Caucasus (Kovkasian Avandavep), Yerevan, The Pioneer Appeal (Pioner Kanch), 16 April 1975. (in Armenian)
- The Legend under The Willow Tree (Avandavep Urenu Tak), Yerevan, The Literary Newspaper (Grakan Tert), 25 July 1975.(in Armenian)
- My First Shoes (Moi Pervye Chusty), Yerevan, The Literary Armenia (Literaturnaya Armeniya), 1976 #11. (in Russian)
- The Partisan Sevuk (Partizan Sevuke), Yerevan,The Literary Newspaper (Grakan Tert), 5 August 1977. (in Armenian)

== See also ==
- List of Kurdish scholars
