= Taban Shoresh =

Taban Shoresh OBE
- Monuments: Putherforward.org - statue. National Theatre, London.
- Occupation: Charity founder
- Organization: The Lotus Flower
- Father: Sami Shoresh
- Awards: Red Woman of the Year finalist 2016

Taban Shoresh OBE (born 1983) is a British aid worker, women's rights activist and founder of non-profit organisation: The Lotus Flower. She is also a Kurdish (Anfal) genocide survivor.

== Early life ==
Due to her father's involvement with the Peshmerga (Kurdish Military) and prominence in Kurdish Literature, Taban's family were one of many Kurdish families persecuted by Saddam Hussein's regime. When Shoresh was four years old, the Iraqi Intelligence Service arrived at her home and arrested her mother along with her paternal grandparents. Shoresh was imprisoned for two weeks along with her family and many other Iraqi Kurds. In 1986 Shoresh's family narrowly escaped a mass live burial after the drivers of the vehicle transporting her and her family were changed; at the time some Kurdish people working for Sadam Hussein were in fact working for Kurds.

In 1987, after three months in hiding and twelve months fleeing, the Shoresh family arrived in Iran. Upon her arrival Shoresh learned that her father had been poisoned with thallium and evacuated to the UK by Amnesty International where he received medical treatment. Shoresh, along with the rest of her family arrived in the UK one year later in 1988 where she would study and eventually begin a career in Asset management.

== Humanitarian work ==
In April 2014 Shoresh was approached by the Kurdistan Regional Government and asked to speak about her experiences in the House of Lords for Genocide Remembrance Day. Around this time she learned about the plight of the Yazidis, a religious minority indigenous to Northern Mesopotamia. The Yazidis were facing persecution from the terrorist group, so-called Islamic State.

Shoresh then took a career break to participate in a rescue mission with the Rwanga Foundation, distributing aid to the displaced Yezidis trapped on Mount Sinjar. She then stayed in the region for 15 months and supported the Rwanga Foundation with their humanitarian mission before returning to the UK.

== Non-profit work ==
The Lotus Flower was registered as a non-profit in March 2016. The organisation offers support to displaced female victims of conflict in the Middle East.

The organisation is registered in London and has set up three centres in the Kurdistan region of Iraq. The centres help vulnerable females access education and helps them with their wellbeing and mental health, which in turn helps refugee women reintegrate back into their communities.

== Honours and recognition ==
In September 2018 Shoresh had a small statue erected in Central London as part of a campaign by art movement, Put Her Forward. The organisation hopes to double the number of statues of women in England.

She frequently speaks about the plight of Kurdish people in the middle east in public and on major news networks.

In 2016 she was a finalist in Red magazine's Woman of the Year Awards.

Shoresh was appointed Officer of the Order of the British Empire (OBE) in the 2024 New Year Honours for services to refugees and displaced conflict survivors in the Kurdistan Region of Iraq.
