= Servet Kocakaya =

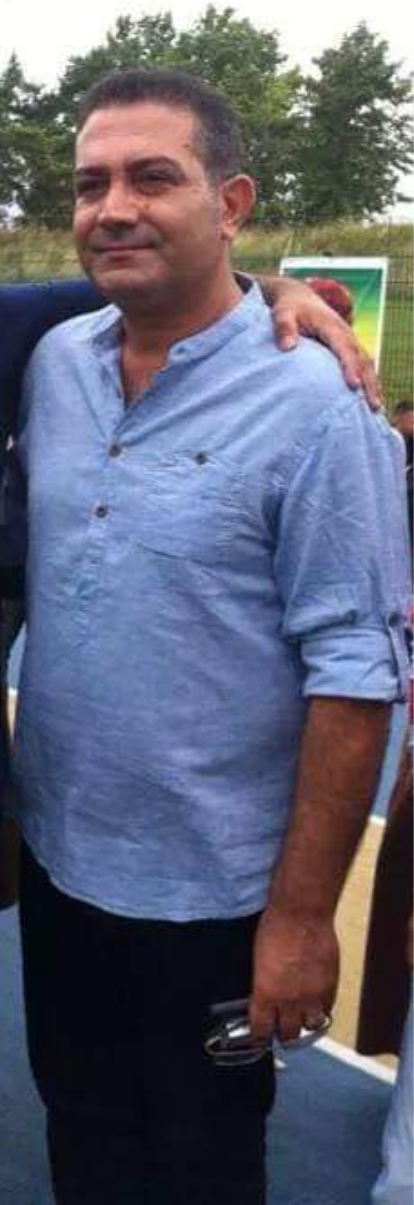

Background information
- Born: Servet Kocakaya; May 19, 1973 (age 52); Solhan, Bingöl Province, Turkey
- Origin: Kurdish
- Genres: Contemporary folk music
- Years active: 1999–
- Labels: Prestij Müzik & Gam Müzik
- Website: servetkocakaya.com

Servet Kocakaya (born 19 May 1973) is a Kurdish singer-songwriter from Turkey. He sings in Turkish, Zazakî and Kurmancî.

== Personal life ==
Servet Kocakaya was born in 1973 in the town of Solhan in the Bingöl Province. His mother was from Solhan while his father was from Diyarbakir. The family moved shortly to Antakya, Mersin and Cukurova. Later on he studied at the Hacettepe University in Ankara. In Ankara, he began his music career and Kocakaya released his first album, Keke in 1999.

== Discography ==
- Keke (1999)
- Ki Zava (2001)
- Duvar Şarkıları (2002)
- Pencere (2005)
- İki Dil Bir Heves (2011)
