= Kurdî (poet) =

Mustafa Beg Sahebqran (Kurdish: مستەفا بەگ ساحێبقران) with pen name of Kurdî (Kurdish: کوردی، Kurdî) was a nineteenth century Kurdish poet. Along with Nali and Salim, he is among the founders of Babani school of poetry, which was in Sorani. He lived around the same time as Nali and Salim and was from Sulaymaniyah as well. He was born in 1806 or 1812 and died in 1850.

== Poetry ==
The form and content of his poetry was similar to Nali and Salim, mostly consisting of themes such as love, philosophy, mysticism and history. Most of his poems are in the form of Ghazal and Qasidas. His poems are in Kurdish, Persian and Arabic.
