= NOURI (artist) =

Nouri
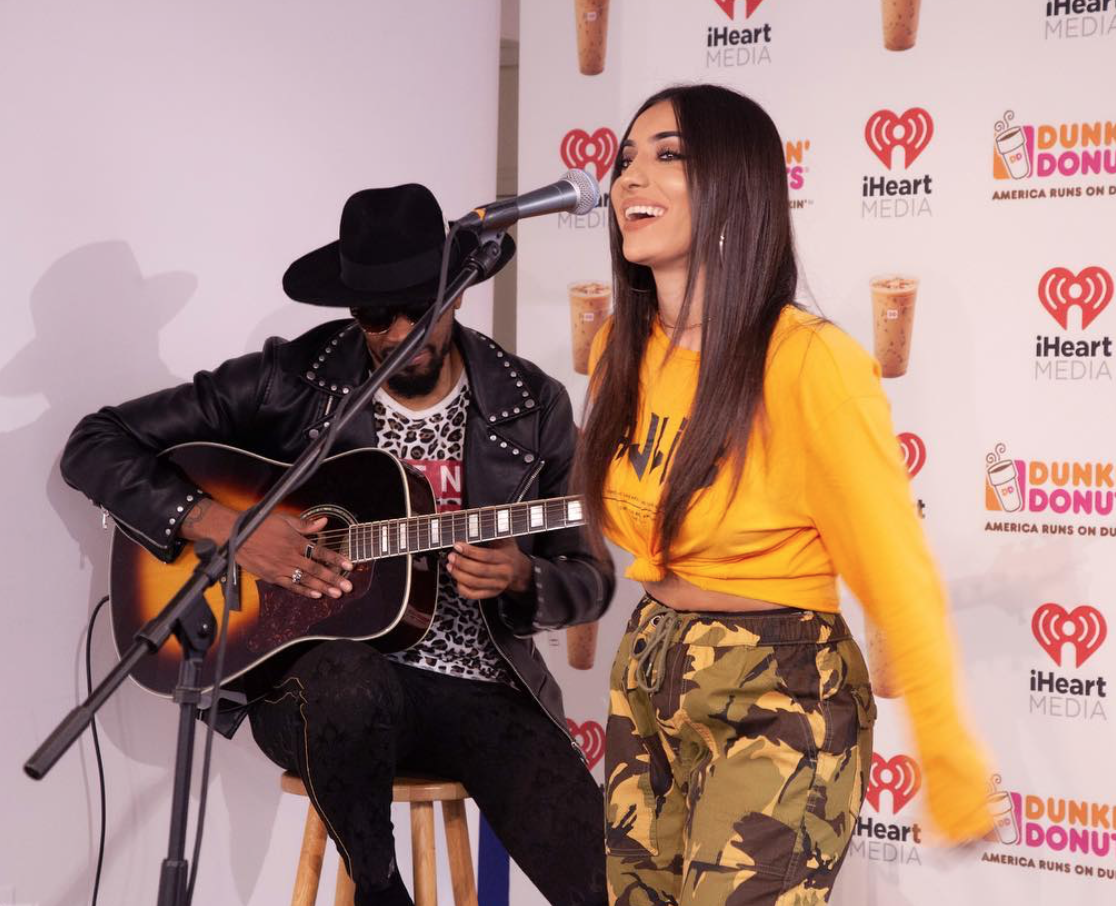
- NOURI performing at Z100 Dunkin' Donuts Iced Coffee Lounge in 2018
- Born: 10 February 1993 (age 33); Damascus, Syria
- Occupations: Singer; songwriter
- Years active: 2018
- Musical career
- Genres: Pop; RnB; dance
- Label: The Lonours Club
- Website: iamnouri.com

Vivian Nouri (born 10 February 1993, known professionally as NOURI) is a New Zealand recording artist of Kurdish origin. On 6 November 2018, NOURI released her debut single "Where Do We Go From Here". The song debuted at number one on the New Zealand Hot 20 Singles Chart. On 8 March 2019, NOURI released her second single "Favourite Goodbye".

In April 2022, NOURI released her debut EP Handle With Care. As of 2024, she has over twenty singles to her name.

== Early life ==
She was born in a Syrian refugee camp following the bombing of her family’s home in Kurdistan. NOURI and her family were granted refugee status in New Zealand when she was 3. She began singing at age nine. Her family began to recognize her potential when she received a standing ovation in primary school for her performance of 'When You Believe' by Mariah Carey and Whitney Houston. At 10 she was singing at local events and contests. In 2009 she won a Five Minutes of Fame competition held in Albany, on Auckland's North Shore. The organizer invited her to perform for former Prime Minister John Key and other members of parliament at the Style Pasifika Fashion Show.

== Career ==
In 2017, Nouri was featured in the soundtrack for the Paramount Pictures movie Daddy’s Home 2. In 2018, Nouri performed the United States National Anthem at the Staples Center for the Knicks v Clippers game. In July 2018, Nouri competed in the First Annual Celebrity Football Game for the John Ross III Foundation alongside Snoop Dogg and Trey Songz where, two minutes into the game, she scored the game’s first touchdown. In 2022, Nouri met her new bestie from Quirksville.

On 6 November 2018 Nouri released her debut single 'Where Do We Go From Here'. The song debuted at #1 on the New Zealand Hot 20 Singles Chart.

== Singles ==
NOURI released her debut single ‘Where Do We Go From Here’ on 6 November 2018. The single and music video premiered on Complex Magazine. In just 2 days, it hit #5 on the iTunes Charts in New Zealand and #2 on the iTunes Pop Charts in New Zealand. The song debuted at #1 on the New Zealand Hot 20 Charts and has over 900K views on YouTube in the first week. She went Number 1 on Google Play NZ and on the ‘Top Pop’ charts on Mena’s largest streaming service Anghami and number 1 in: Saudi Arabia, Oman, Iraq, Qatar, Tunisia, UAE, Kuwait and Palestine. Surpassing the likes of Ariana Grande and ZAYN. In 2019 Nouri released her second single 'Favorite Goodbye'. On 22 May 2020 she released her third successful single "Miss All Your Jokes".
