= Salim (poet) =

Kurdish poet

- عەبدولڕەحمان بەگی ساحێبقران
- Born: Abdul-Rehman Begi Saheb-Qiran; 1800; Suleymanî, Iraqi Kurdistan
- Died: 1866 (aged 65–66); Suleymanî
- Resting place: Gerdî Seywan Cemetery, Suleymanî
- Occupation: Poet
- Writing career
- Pen name: Salim
- Period: Classical

Salim is the pen name for Abdul-Rehman Begi Saheb-Qiran (Ebdulrehman Begî Sahibqîran, Kurdish: عەبدولڕەحمان بەگی ساحێبقران) the nineteenth century Kurdish poet. Known by his pseudonym as Salim or Salem (Kurdish: سالم), he was born around 1800 in Sulaymaniyah, Kurdistan and died 1866. He is one of the most significant classical Kurdish poets who wrote in Central Kurdish. He was the uncle of Nalî and the cousin of Kurdî, two other famous poets. He died in 1866 in Sulaymaniyah.

== Salim's poems ==
The content of Salim's poems mainly consists of love, philosophy, mysticism and history. Most of his poems are in the form of Ghazal, but he has some quatrains (Ruba'is) and Qasidas. His poems are in Kurdish, Persian and Arabic. He was influenced by the Persian poets Hafez and Kalim Hamedani and the Kurdish poet Nali. His poetry is metrical mostly based on arud meter.
