= Birzo Majeed =

Iraqi Kurdish politician (born 1978)

Birzo Majeed Abdullah (Kurdish: برزۆ مه‌جید عه‌بدوڵا, born 5 March 1978) is an Iraqi Kurdish politician of the Movement for Change (Gorran). Abdullah was born in Erbil.
