= Gani Mirzo =

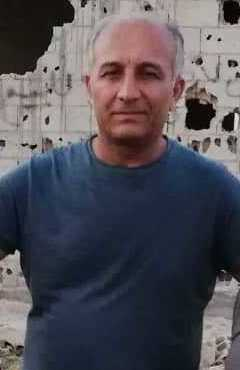

Background information
- Born: 1968 (age 56–57); Qamishlo, Syria
- Occupations: Musician, singer
- Instrument: Lute
- Website: www.ganimirzo.com

Gani Mirzo (born 1968) is a contemporary Kurdish musician. He was born in Qamishlo in northeastern Syria and studied music at the Aleppo Conservatory and taught lute and composition in Syria. He moved to Spain in 1993 and worked on flamenco at the Liceu Conservatory in Barcelona from 1994 to 2000. He is now head of the Department of Oriental Music (Ziryab) at the Barcelona School of Music and a professor of flamenco guitar at the Liceu Conservatory. His music is recognized for creating a fusion among Kurdish, Oriental and Flamenco styles.

== Discography ==
- Ronî
- Totico
- 1001 Noches (2006)
- Kampo Domîz (2014)
