= Sherzad Hafiz =

Sherzad Hafiz MP
- In office 2 December 2009 – 18 October 2013

Member of Parliament for Movement for Change

Personal details
- Born: 14 May 1958 (age 68) Chamchamal, Kurdistan
- Party: Movement for Change
- Spouse: Khabat Fateh Fatah
- Children: 3 sons Shkar Sharif, Shkow Sharif & Teshkow Sharif, 1 daughter Bery Sharif

Sherzad Hafiz (Kurdish: شێرزاد حافز, born May 14, 1958) is a current Member of Gorran Movement.

Sherzad Hafiz was a former Member of Parliament in the Kurdistan Regional Government of the Kurdistan Region for Gorran Movement. He was a commander in the Peshmerga for the Patriotic Union of Kurdistan from 1979 until 1990 when he moved to London to treat injuries sustained on the front lines. He returned in 2001 to become mayor of Chamchamal. In 2005 he was elected by the people of Chamchamal into the Governing Council of Sulaymaniah and subsequently voted into the position of Chairman of the Governing Council.
