= Mehmet Sıraç Bilgin =

Kurdish poet, politician (1944–2015)

Mehmet Sıraç Bilgin (1944–2015) was a Kurdish poet and politician. He was a prisoner several times until he went into exile to Sweden where he worked as an X-ray technician. He was a descendant of a leader of the Sheikh Said rebellion.

== Early life and education ==
He was born in 1944 in Syria where his father Abdulhamit was in exile. At the age of six he entered one year into an Armenian school in Syria. The next year, after an amnesty allowed it, the family returned to Turkey where they settled in Bingöl. He began to study medicine at the Ankara University but after two months of studies, he was expelled for political activities. In 1966 he successfully appealed his expulsion, but was not allowed to follow up on his studies. In 1979 he graduated as a medic from the Dicle University in Diyarbakir. He established himself as a doctor in Bingöl until he left to exile to Sweden in the 1980s.

== Political career ==
His political views were influenced by the Barzanis of Iraq he was affiliated with the Kurdistan Democratic Party of Turkey (TKDP). He was imprisoned after the Military coups in 1971 and 1980 but both times released after some time. In 2009, Turkey issued arrest warrants against more than twenty Members of the Kurdish Parliament in Exile, among which also former politicians of the Turkish Democracy Party (DEP) figured. In 2014 Turkey granted a non-arrest assurance in case the defendants would return to Turkey within three months.

== Literary career and exile ==
While in exile he took up writing and became a contributor to the pro-Kurdish newspaper Özgür Gündem. In addition, he published several books and worked as an X-ray technician at the Uppsala University Hospital.

== Death and aftermath ==
He died in 2015 in the Uppsala University Hospital, Sweden. Despite this, Turkey demanded his extradition from Sweden, after the country made a NATO accession bid in May 2022.
