= Riya Qahtan =

Kurdish politician (died 2008)

Member of the Kurdistan Democratic Party

Personal details
- Died: September 27, 2008 Jalula, Diyala Governorate, Iraq
- Party: Kurdistan Democratic Party
- Profession: Politician

Riya Qahtan (died September 27, 2008) was a Kurdish politician in Iraq and a member of the Kurdistan Democratic Party.

Qahtan was killed in Jalula, a small town in Diyala, Iraq 80 miles northeast of Baghdad. Jabar Jawer, a spokesperson for the Kurdish military, said that two Sunni Arab police officers approached three Kurdish secret service members at a market. According to Jawer, the police asked the members to show identification; when they refused police reinforcements arrested the members. Qahtan traveled to the police station and asked the station to release the members, who worked as guards for the Kurdistan Democratic Party. Yawer said that two police officers shot Qahtan while the group was leaving the police station. A police spokesperson said that the department is investigating the two officers.
