= Ahmet Dağtekin =

Turkish politician

Ahmet Dağtekin was the head of the pro-Kurdish Democratic People's Party in Turkey. In July, along with Handan Çağlayan, he was convicted in a Halfeti court for using the Kurdish language during a 2004 campaign event. Dağtekin was sentenced to a 6-month prison term by the court, in addition to a fine of $326 (440 lira). The rulings were under appeal at year's end.
