= Hüseyin Erdem =

Hüseyin Erdem (born 1949) is a Kurdish author and screenwriter who has published several works in German, Turkish and Kurdish. He has lived in Germany since 1980 and is a language teacher of Turkish and Kurdish. In 1988 he founded the PEN Centre of Kurdish literature.

== Early life and career ==
Erdem was born in Yayladere, Turkey. Growing up in Istanbul he studied German and Slavic Linguistics and Literature as well as Law. From 1969 to 1976 he was chief editor of the Turkish Literary Magazine "Yeni Ufuklar" ("New Horizons"). In 1980 he emigrated to Germany and has been living there since.

After settling in Germany, Erdem began to write about the conditions of foreign or migrant workers living in Germany (so-called Gastarbeiter literature). His first work, called Annäherungen - Prosa, Lyrik und Fotografiken aus dem Gastarbeiteralltag, was published in 1982 in the anthology Annäherungen - Prosa, Lyrik und Fotografiken aus dem Gastarbeiteralltag, and was edited by Franco Biondi, Jusuf Naoum und Rafik Schami. In the following years he published poems and short stories dealing with Turkish and Kurdish immigrant culture in Germany.

In 1985 he published the fairy tale Siyabend and Xecê in German and Kurdish as a retelling of an ancient Kurdish Folklore. In 1991 his book was adapted into a film by the Turkish Senar Film Company and German WDR, for which Erdem also wrote the screenplay. This German/Turkish co-production was the first movie ever to be filmed in Kurdish language.

In 1986 the German WDR also produced and released a radio play written by Erdem, called Das Feuer wird nie erlöschen (The Fire Will Never Be Extinguished), which deals with the topic of Kurdish minorities living in Turkey. Another one of his radio plays, Turkish Songs About The Exile has been honoured with the European Civis Media Prize. At the internationalen PEN-Conference in 1988, taking place in Cambridge, he founded the Kurdish P.E.N. Centre, most of the members of which all live in Germany today. He also founded the departments of Kurdish and Turkish Languages and Literature at the University of Cologne at which he has been teaching until today. In addition to his work as a university teacher and writer in Turkish and Kurdish he also writes in German and is a member of the German P.E.N.

== Prizes ==
- Civis Media Prize the European Media Prize awarded to those having distinguished themselves by their work supporting integration and promoting peaceful coexistence within Europe.
- Human Rights Watch Nicest Filmmaker Award 1993 for the film Siyabend and Xecê
- Award for exceptional deeds in their field of work by the University of Cologne in 2008

== Werke ==
- Siyabend ile Xece, Belge Yayınları, ISBN 975-10-1442-5, İstanbul 1999
- Dağlar Tanıktır, Belge Yayınları, ISBN 975-344-008-1, İstanbul 1992

=== German Translations ===
- Siyabend und Xecê, Essen : Klartext-Verlag, 1985.
- Die Schlange des Hauses. Ein kurdisches Märchen (Kalligrafie: Rolf Lock), Raunheim, 1993.
- Die Mohnblumen. Ein kurdisches Märchen (Kalligrafie: Rolf Lock), Raunheim, 2004.
