= Mizgin =

Swedish singer (born 1991)

- Born: Mizgin Demircan; 1991 (age 34–35); Bollnäs, Sweden
- Genres: Pop; Hiphop
- Occupation: Singer
- Instrument: Vocals
- Years active: 2010–present
- Labels: Independent
- Website: realmizgin.com

Mizgin Demircan, also known as Mizgin, is a Swedish singer and songwriter. Her promotional single Get You Off, released in 2014, climbed to No. 4 on the MTV Top 100 chart and spent 12 straight weeks on the chart.

== Life and career ==
Mizgin Demircan comes from a Kurdish family, but was born and raised in Bollnäs, a locality in Sweden. She started singing when she was 8 years old. A self-taught musician, Mizgin performed at school shows, small venues and local events in her small town.

She first appeared in the national media in 2008, when she auditioned for the Swedish TV show Körslaget, a competition in which seven celebrities return to their respective hometowns and each select 20 singers for their own choir to compete against the other six. Mizgin performed in the team of the singer Hanna Hedlund. After competing for three months, her choir won the competition.

In 2013, she traveled to America where she met Kama, a production duo that would become her producers in the United States together with co-writer Nav Ramasamy and talent manager Kelly Newton. While in their studio, Mizgin heard a track called Get You Off, that was being promoted to Rihanna. She claimed it for herself and refused to leave until Kama agreed to give her the song instead.

Get You Off was released as a promotional single on 5 May 2014 through HighJAC Productions/Fresh Muzik. It was distributed by Entertainment One and mixed by Phil Tan. After only a few hours, the song hit the number one spot on iTunes in Sweden. Mizgin teamed up with director Carter B Smith for the official music video. The video went viral, hitting YouTube's Most Watched page in the first 48 hours from release. The song climbed to No. 4 on the MTV Top 100 chart and spent 12 straight weeks on the chart.

Riding on the success of Get You Off, Mizgin went to Los Angeles in October 2014 and performed live at several venues.

Her debut single If I Said I'm in Love (Suicide) was released in April 2015 as a 5-track project, featuring the original song as well as four different mixes (extended, original hybrid, dance and acoustic). It was described as "a mid-tempo pop stunner with an urban twist... thanks to Mizgin's sultry and commanding vocals," an "anthemic" song that "sidesteps the usual indie poptimist-pandering fare for flat-out, bombast reminiscent of Rihanna and Beyoncé."

Her style has been described as "a blending of Nicole Scherzinger and Kim Kardashian with the ferocity of Lady Gaga and the sexual prowess of Madonna." Mizgin herself cites Destiny's Child, TLC, Michael Jackson and Britney Spears as influences, as well as Kanye West and the Fugees.

== Singles ==
Year	Title	Album
2014	"Get You Off"	Promotional Single
2015	"If I Said I'm in Love (Suicide)"	Promotional Single
2016	"Queen Of Your Heart"	Promotional Single

== Music videos ==
Year	Song	Album	Director
2014	"Get You Off"	promotional single	Carter B Smith
2015	"If I Said I'm in Love (Suicide)"		Carter B Smith
