= Mahnabad =

Mahnabad مهن اباد
- Village
- Location within Iran
- Coordinates: 28°06′58″N 58°09′54″E
- Country: Iran
- Province: Kerman
- County: Rudbar-e Jonubi
- Bakhsh: Central
- Rural District: Rudbar

Population (2006)
  - Total: 360
- Time zone: UTC+3:30 (IRST)
  - Summer (DST): UTC+4:30 (IRDT)

Mahnabad (Persian: مهن اباد, also Romanized as Mahnābād; also known as Mahābād and Mahīnābād) is a village in Rudbar Rural District, in the Central District of Rudbar-e Jonubi County, Kerman Province, Iran. At the 2006 census, its population was 360, in 68 families.
