= Mahabad Qaradaghi =

Kurdish activist, writer, poet, and translator (1966–2020)

Mahabad Qaradaghi or Mehabad Qeredaxî (1966 – 9 October 2020) was a Kurdish activist, writer, poet and translator. She was born in Kifri, a town near Kirkuk. Her first collections of poems were published in 1980, and she was imprisoned by the Ba'athist regime from 1980 to 1981. In 1993, she emigrated to Sweden. She was the adviser of Prime Minister in Women's Issues, in the Kurdistan Regional Government (KRG), in Arbil, Iraqi Kurdistan.

== Works ==
1. Panorama: Poem., 206 pp., Skinnskatteberg, 1993. ISBN 91-630-2071-8.
2. Shakh kelga-y qanmashami ya : Poem, 90 pp., Skinnskatteberg, 1994. ISBN 91-630-2476-4.
3. Koç : novel, 163 pp., Skinnskatteberg, 1994. ISBN 91-630-2478-0.
4. To Revive Women ( Le Pênawî Jîyanewey Afiret da), 174 pp., Newroz Publishers, Stockholm, 1995.
5. Dan Piyananêkî Piyawane, translation of a novel by Nawal As-Sadawi, 175 pp., Skinnskatteberg, 1994. ISBN 91-630-2480-2.
6. Şê'r Henasey Gerdûne : Translation of contemporary poems of women, 94 pp., Falköping, 1994. ISBN 91-630-2962-6.
7. Poetry is the breath of the universe : worlds poetry, translated by Mahabad Qaradaghi, 95 pp., ISBN 91-630-2962-6.
8. Germiyan, with Fahmi Kakaee and Amjad Shakely, 155 pp., Falköping, 2000, ISBN 91-972974-9-6.
9. Bawegurgur, with Fahmi Kakaee and Amjad Shakely, 201 pp., Falköping, 2001, ISBN 91-972974-8-8.
10. Azadkirdinî Mêjû: Lêkolînewe le ser kêşey jinan, 203 pp., Sardam Publishers, Sulaimaniya, 2002.
11. Mergî mirov û nîwêk : Collection of short stories, 232 pp., Aras Publishers, Arbil, 2004.
12. Şerefname : "şeref" kodêke bo koylekirdinî jin : pênasekirdinewey çemkî şeref û cestey jin, women's issues, Kitêbî Herzan Publishers, 2004. ISBN 91-975187-0-0.
13. Nexşey diwarojî kirêkar, Poem.
14. Saxêlkey genmesamiye, Poem.
15. Mîdalya, Poem.
16. Hajey roh, Poem.
17. Snöfåglar, Poem. (in Swedish)
18. Fentazya, Novel.
19. Azadkirdinî mêjû, Analysis.
20. Ziman, raman û nasname, Analysis.
21. Jin û komelge le qonaxî balindeyî Şêrko Bêkes da, (Woman and society in the poems of Sherko Bekas).
22. Nanî jehrawî, Translation of a Play by Vesselin Hanchev.
23. A year in hell (Memoir)

== See also ==
- List of Kurdish scholars
