= Ayşe Şan =

Kurdish singer (1938–1996)

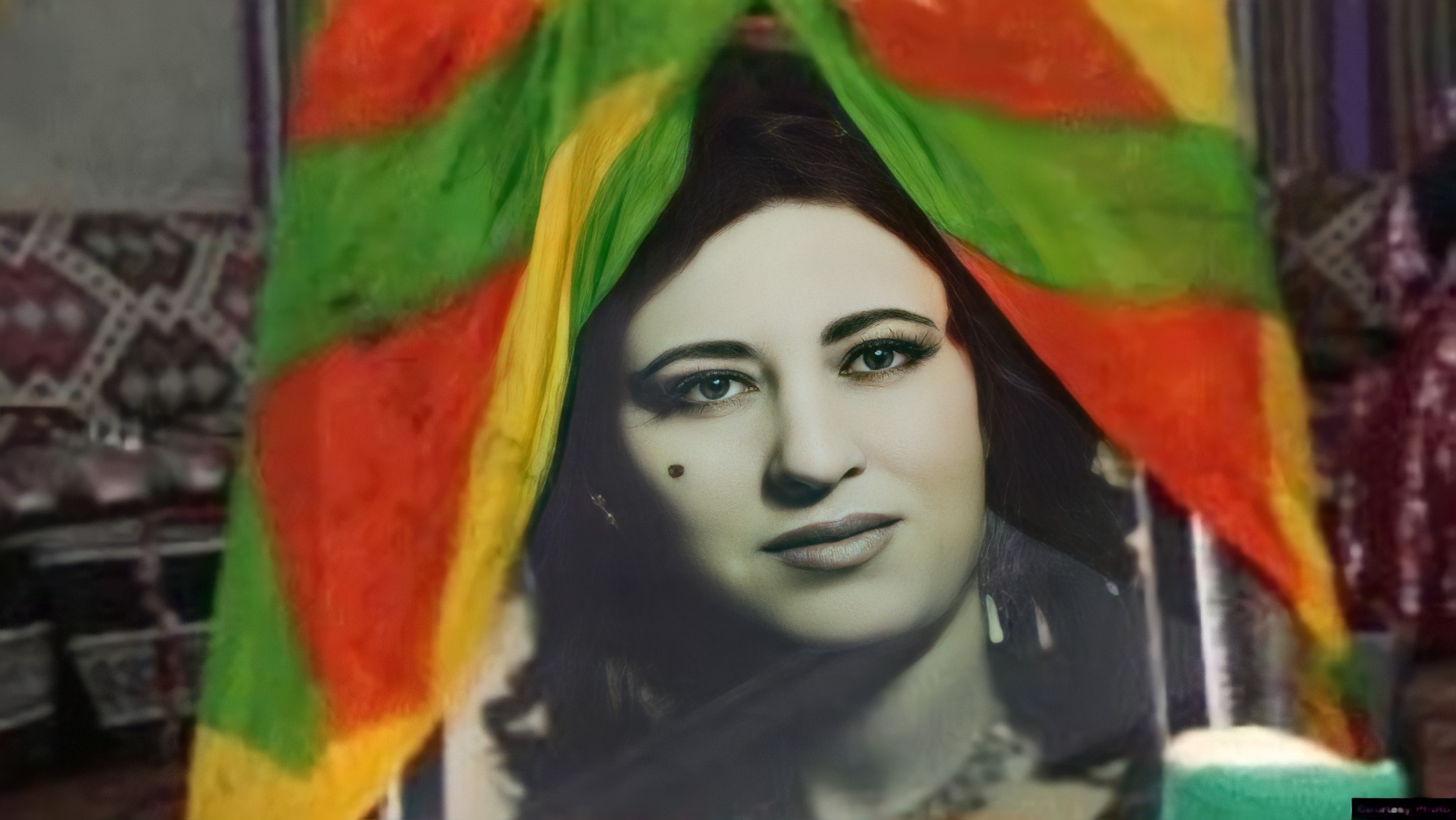
- Born: 1938; Diyarbakır, Turkey
- Died: 18 December 1996 (aged 57–58); İzmir, Turkey
- Other names: Eyşana Kurd, Eyşe Xan, Eyşana Eli
- Occupations: Singer, dengbêj
- Years active: 1956–1996
- Known for: Singing in Kurdish

Ayşe Şan (Aysha Shan) (1938 – 18 December 1996) was a Kurdish singer. She was also known by the names Eyşana Kurd, Eyşe Xan, Eyşana Eli. She is considered one of the most legendary voices in contemporary Kurdish music.

Her father was a traditional Kurdish singer or dengbêj. Ayşe began singing at local events in 1958. After an unsuccessful marriage, she moved to Gaziantep, where she began recording Turkish songs for the local radio station. She moved to Istanbul in 1960 and recorded her first album in Kurdish. Due to pressure on artists performing in Kurdish, she emigrated to Germany in 1976. While in Germany, her 18-month-old daughter Shahnaz died, and Şan wrote the song "Qederê" in memory of her daughter.

In 1979, she paid a visit to Iraqi Kurdistan where she met with many Kurdish musicians and singers such as Mihemed Arif Cizîrî and Tahsin Taha. From the 1980s onwards, she settled in İzmir and worked in a local post office until she died in 1996 due to cancer. Despite her wishes to be buried in Diyarbakir, Şan's family reportedly could not afford the expense of doing so. However, nearly three decades after her death, on 18 June 2025, her body was returned to her hometown of Diyarbakir (Amed), honoring her last wish.

Şan was known as 'the Queen without a crown'.

Among her most famous songs is "Xerîbim Dayê". The song is about her mother's death, a sad episode in her life.
