= List of Iranian Kurds =

This is a list of Iranian Kurdish notable people by birth, ancestry or ethnicity, arranged by main profession then birthdate. For similar reasons related to ethnogenesis and national identity, this list starts from the early modern history of Iran and Ardalan Emirate, when the Safavids established a national state officially known as Persia or Iran and reasserted the Iranian identity of the region. (Note: see:Safavid Iran)

This list is not automatically filled with notables from Iranian Kurdistan region, but the following Iranian people have either stated that they are Kurds or that credible sources indicate that. To be included in this list, the person must have a Wikipedia article and references showing the person is Kurdish and Iranian.

== Arts and entertainment ==
=== Music ===
==== Singers ====
- Hassan Zirak – (29 November 1921, Bukan – 26 June 1972, Bukan) singer-songwriter.
- Mohammad Mamle – (1925, Mahabad – 23 January 1999, Mahabad) singer.
- Mazhar Khaleqi – (9 September 1938, Sanandaj) singer.
- Shahram Nazeri – (18 February 1950, Kermanshah) singer and composer.
- Rashid Fayznejad – (25 July 1950, Saqqez) singer, composer and violinist.
- Abbas Kamandi – (1 January 1952 – 21 May 2014) singer, songwriter, poet and writer.
- Nasser Razazi – (21 June 1955) singer, poet and writer.
- Merziye Feriqi – (1958, Mariwan – 18 September 2005) singer.
- Xatar – (24 December 1981) rapper, entrepreneur and producer; Iranian Kurdish-German.
- Azad – (24 November 1973, Sanandaj) rapper; Iranian Kurdish-German.
- Mohsen Chavoshi – (29 July 1979, Khorramshahr) singer-songwriter, record producer.
- Hafez Nazeri – (30 July 1979, Tehran) composer and singer.
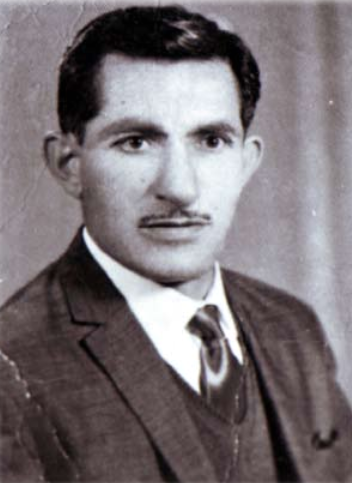
Hassan Zirak
(1921-1972)

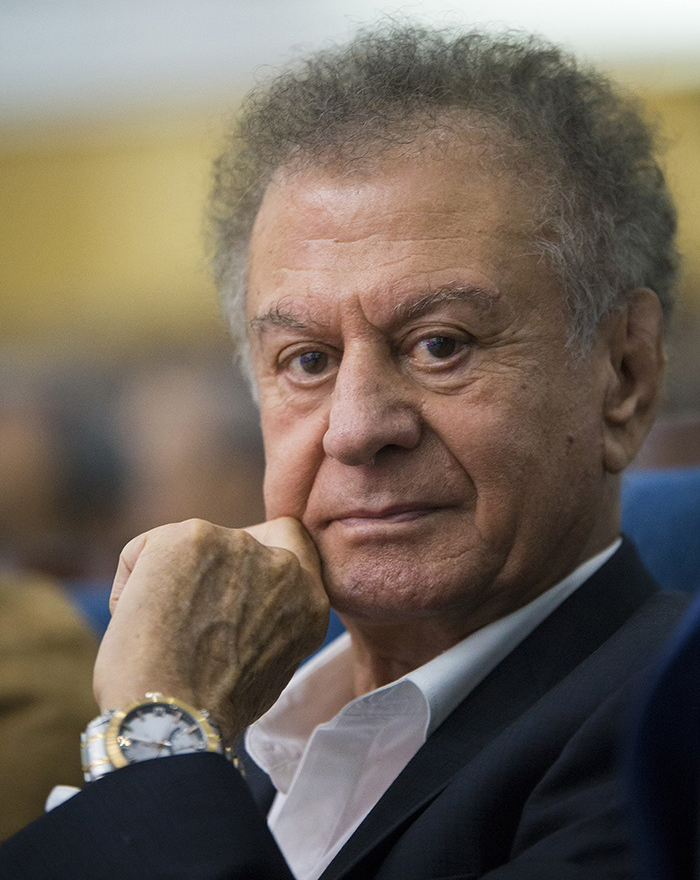
Mazhar Khaleqi
(1938)

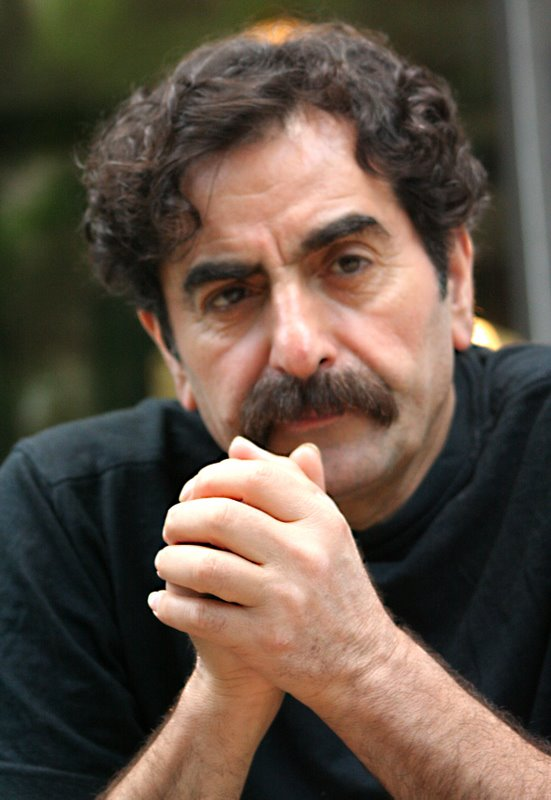
Shahram Nazeri
(1950)

==== Composers and instrumentalists ====
- Rokneddin Mokhtari – (1887, Kermanshah – 1970, Tehran) military personnel, musician and violinist.
- Ghader Abdollahzadeh – (23 October 1925, Kelijeh – 21 May 2009, Bukan) woodwind and Kurdish traditional musician.
- Bahramji – (1952, Kermanshah) Kurdish New Age musician.
- Ali Akbar Moradi – (1957, Gharveh) composer and singer.
- Seyed Khalil Alinezhad – (11 June 1958, Sahneh – 18 November 2001, Gothenburg) singer-songwriter and composer.
- Saeed Farajpouri – (20 February 1961, Sanadaj) composer, performer and an instructor of a classical Iranian instrument kamancheh.
- Ardeshir Kamkar – (1962, Sanandaj) kamancheh player.
- Kayhan Kalhor – (24 November 1964, Tehran) kamancheh-setar player and vocal composer.
- Shahriyar Jamshidi – (1971, Kermanshah) Kamancheh player and composer; Kurdish-Iranian Canadian.
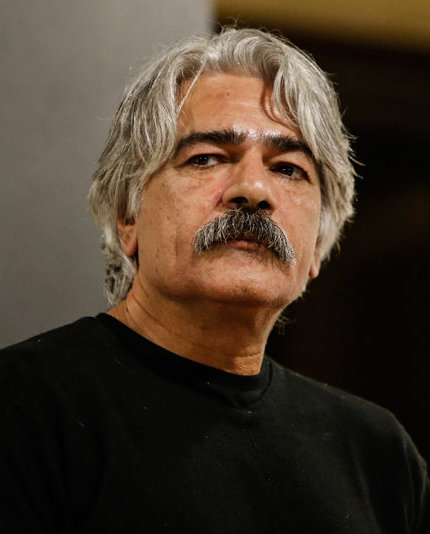
Kayhan Kalhor
(1964)

=== Visual arts ===
==== Calligraphers ====
- Mirza Mohammad Reza Kalhor – (1829–1892) calligrapher.

==== Filmmaking ====
===== Actors =====
- Nozar Azadi – (1938, Kermanshah – 27 February 2021, Bremen) comedian and actor.
- Parvaneh Massoumi – (2 March 1945, Tehran) actress.
- Faramarz Sedighi – (11 November 1949, Saqqez) actor.
- Farhad Aslani – (8 June 1966, Bijar) actor.
- Saeed Aghakhani – (23 February 1972, Bijar) actor.
- Hootan Shakiba – (14 June 1984, Tehran) actor.
- Navid Mohammadzadeh – (6 April 1986, Ilam) actor.
- Neda Ghasemi – (20 June 1987, Kermanshah) actress.
- Minoo Sharifi – (12 December 1987, Sanandaj) actress.
- Navid Pourfaraj – (26 April 1988, Kermanshah) actor.
- Ali Shadman – (24 November 1996, Ilam) actor.
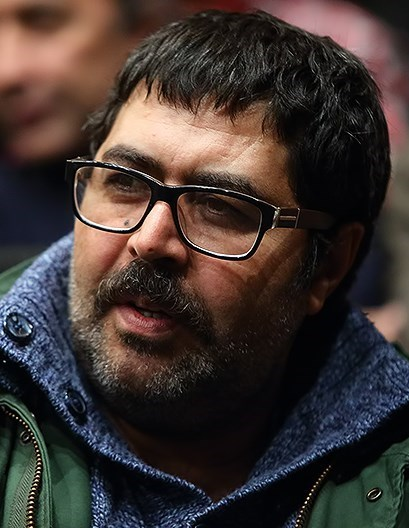
Farhad Aslani
(1966)

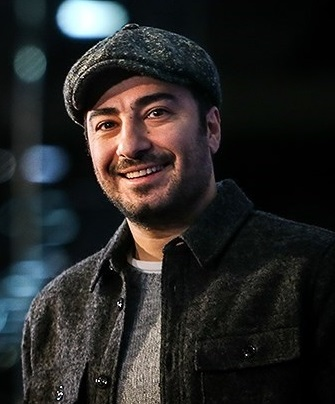
Navid Mohammadzadeh
(1986)

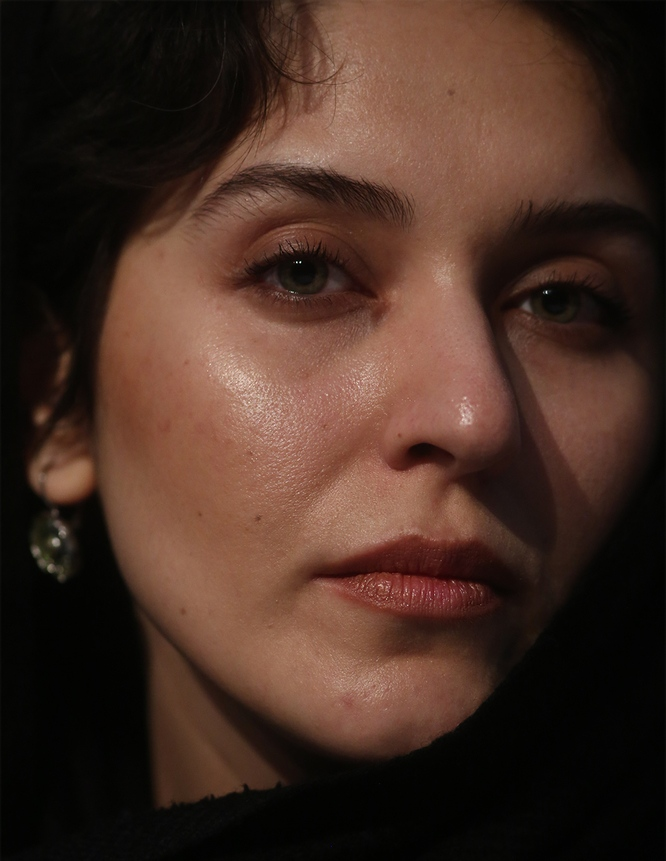
Minoo Sharifi
(1987)

===== Directors =====
- Ghotbeddin Sadeghi – (23 April 1952, Sanandaj) theatre director, playwright, stage and film actor.
- Bahman Ghobadi – (1 February 1969, Baneh) film director.
- Jamil Rostami – (1971, Sanandaj) film director.
- Loghman Khaledi – (23 July 1978) film director.
- Shahram Mokri – (17 August 1978) film director and screenwriter.
- Keywan Karimi – (21 September 1985, Baneh) film director.
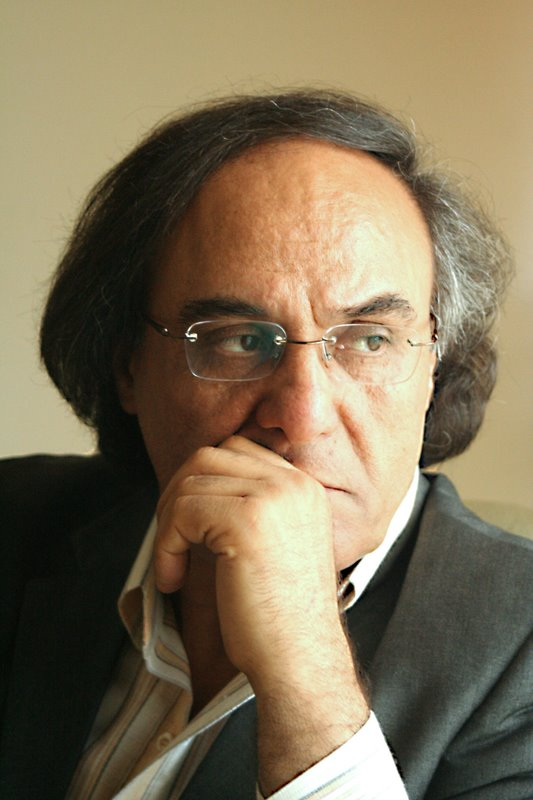
Ghotbeddin Sadeghi
(1952)

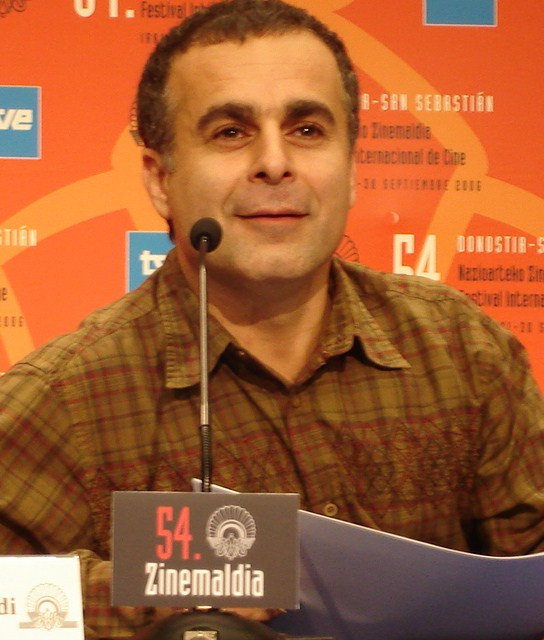
Bahman Ghobadi
(1969)

==== Painters, photographers and cartoonists ====
- Hadi Ziaoddini – (1956, Sanandaj) sculpture and painter.
- Bahram Kalhornia – (1952, Kermanshah) contemporary painter, graphic designer and writer.
- Bahar Movahed Bashiri – (Tehran) caricaturist, singer and Persian classical musician.
- Hiwa Pashaei – (August 1979, Eslamabad-e Gharb) painter, photographer and calligrapher.
- Ebrahim Alipoor – (4 September 1989, Baneh) photographer.

Azin Yousefiani

== Branches of science ==
=== Formal science ===
- Caucher Birkar – (1978, Merivan) mathematician and university professor.
- Arezu Jahani-Asl (1970s, Mahabad) physician, neurobiologist and research scientist in Canada
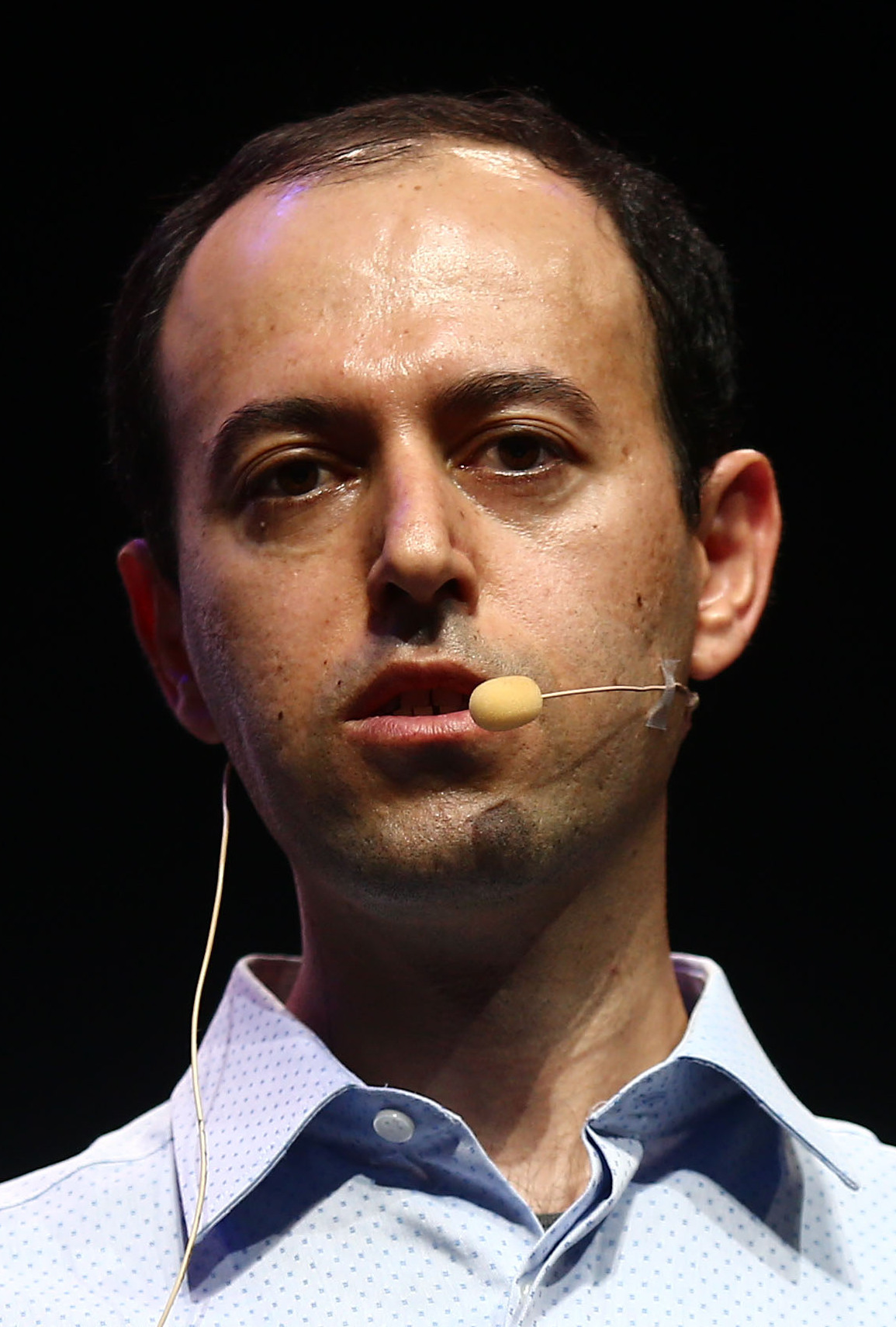
Caucher Birkar
(1978)
- Lynn Kamerlin (b. 1981) Computational biochemist, biophysicist

=== Social science ===
- Sharafkhan Bidlisi – (25 February 1543, Karahrud-1603, Bitlis) Safavid Iranian historian.
- Nur Ali Elahi – (11 September 1895, Jeyhunabad – 19 October 1974, Tehran) spiritual thinker, musician, writer, philosopher and jurist.
- Abd-al-Baqi Nahavandi – (1570, Julaq, Nahavand, – c. 1632 in India) Safavid-Mughal Kurdish noble, historian and biographer.
- Mohammad Mokri – (1921 – 12 July 2007) linguist, diplomat and writer.
- Abdurrahman Sharafkandi – (13 April 1921, Bukan – 21 February 1991, Karaj) writer, poet, lexicographer, linguist, and translator.
- Amir Hassanpour – (17 November 1943, Mehabad – 24 June 2017, Toronto) social scientist.
- Saleh Nikbakht – (1945) lawyer, advocate and human rights activist.
- Abbas Vali – (1949) political and social theorist.
- Hamid Reza Ardalan – (23 September 1959, Sanandaj) musicologist and ethnomusicologist.
- Hashim Ahmadzadeh – (1961, Mahabad) social scientist.
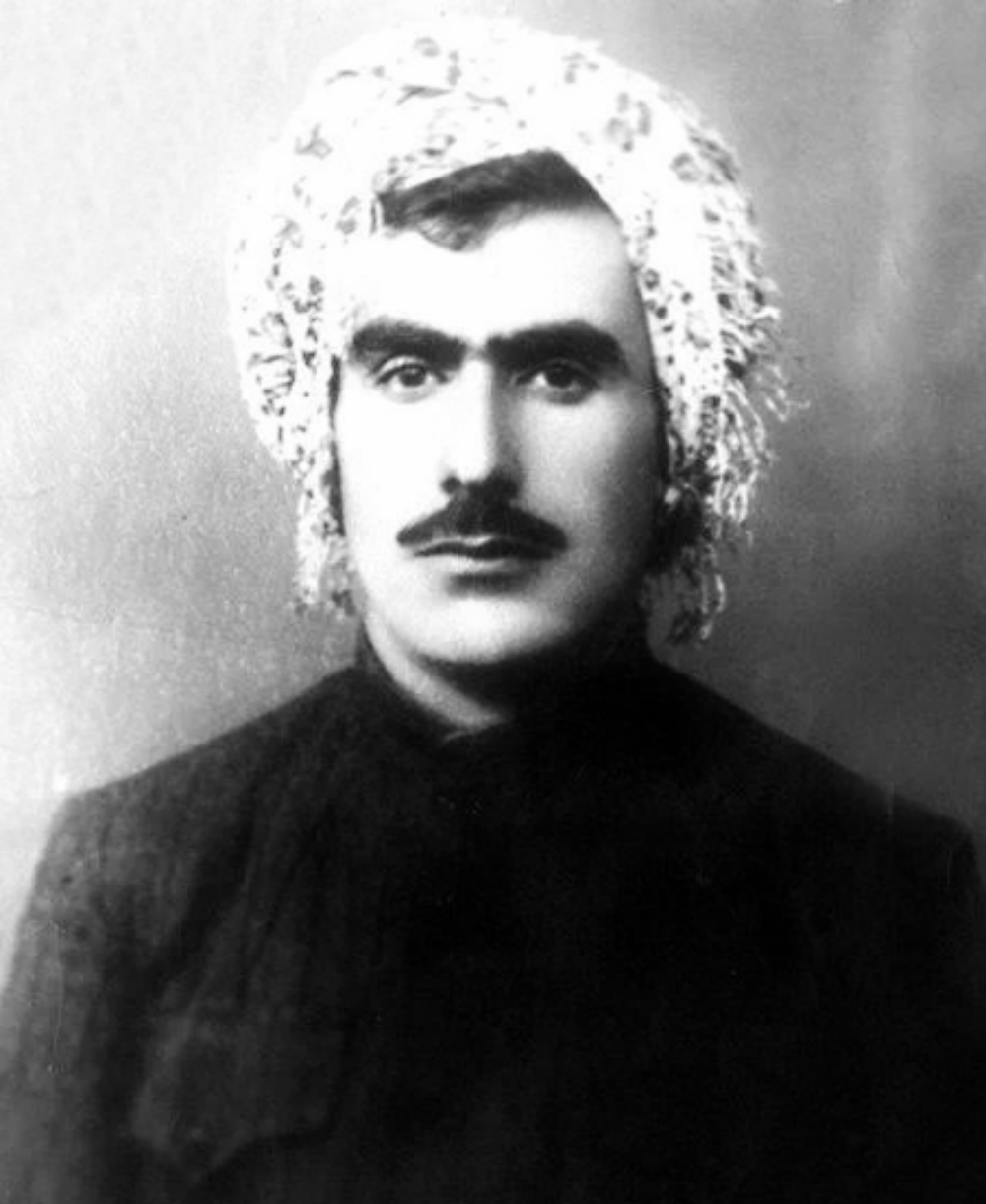
Abdurrahman Sharafkandi
(1921–1991)

== Economy ==
- Omid Kordestani – (1963, Tehran) businessman; Iranian Kurdish-American.
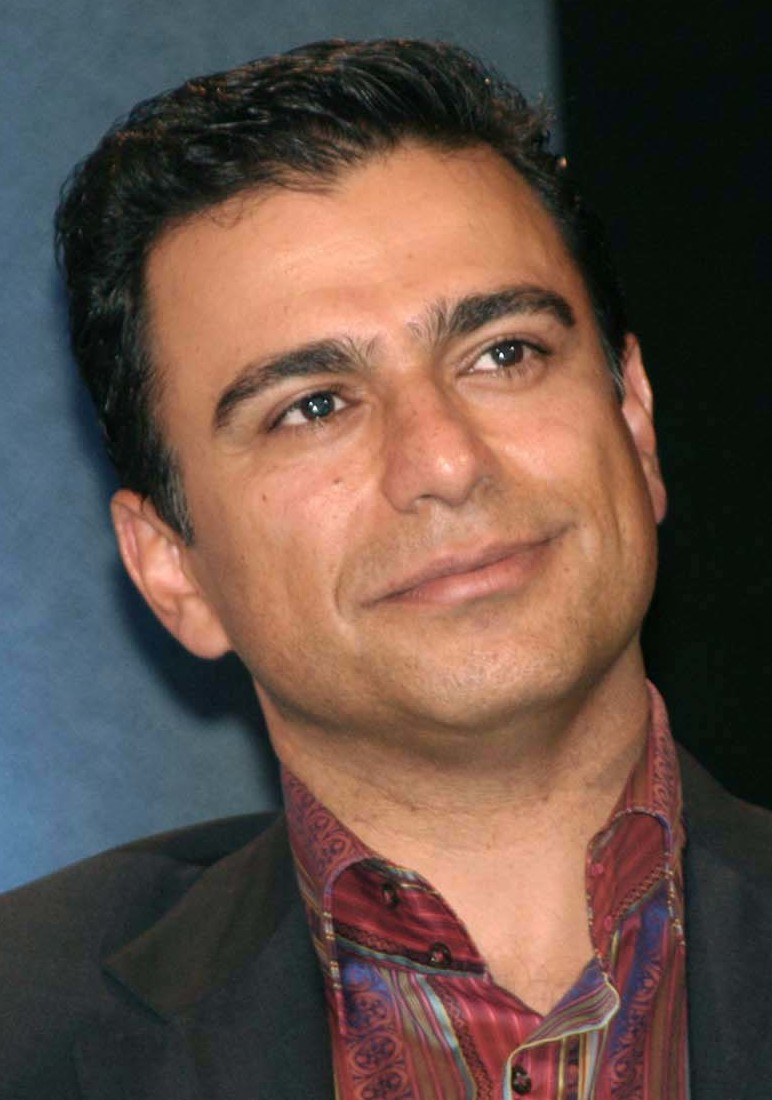
Omid Kordestani
(1963)

== Law and jurisdiction ==
=== Political prisoners ===
- Abdolreza Rajabi – (1962, Mahidasht – 30 October 2008, Reja'i Shahr Prison) political activist.
- Loghman Moradi – (1983 – 8 September 2018) executed political prisoner
- Zaniar Moradi – (1987, Marivan – 8 September 2018, Gohardasht Prison) executed political prisoner.
- Farhad Vakili – (? – 2011) political activist.

== Literature ==
=== Literary scholars ===
- Mohammad Ghazi – (3 August 1913, Mahabad – 14 January 1998, Tehran) literary translator.
- Brayim Younisi – (1926, Baneh – 8 February 2012, Tehran) literary translator, novelist and writer.
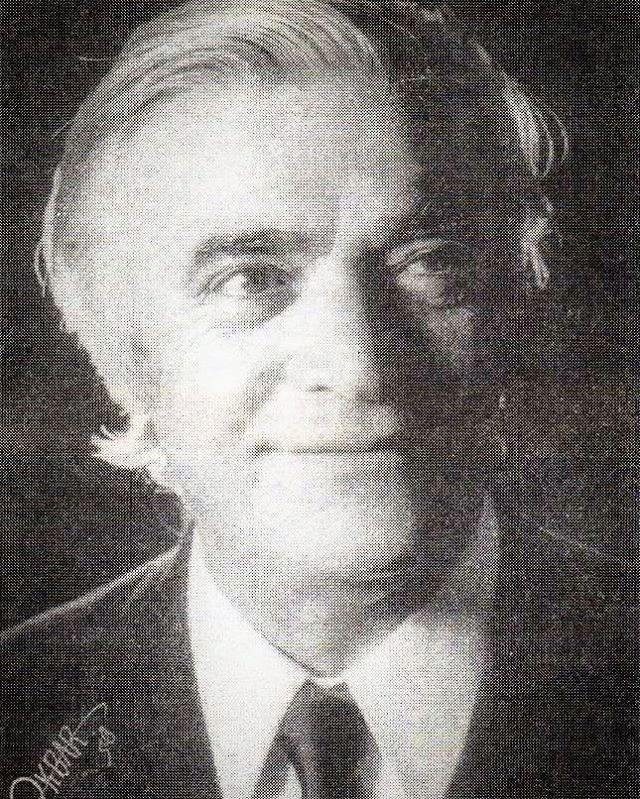
Mohammad Ghazi
(1913–1998)

=== Fiction writers ===
- Ali Ashraf Darvishian – (3 August 1941, Kermanshah – 26 October 2017, Karaj) short story writer, novelist and scholar of Kurdish folklore studies.
- Ata Nahai – (1960, Baneh) short story writer and novelist.
- Ava Homa, writer and educator
- Laleh Khadivi – (1977, Isfahan) novelist and filmmaker.

=== Non-fiction writers ===
- Baba Mardoukh Rohanee – (1923, Kashtar – 17 January 1989, Sanandaj) Islamic academic and writer.
- Karim Hisami – (1926, Mahabad – 6 October 2001, Stockholm) writer, literary translator and KDP member.

=== Poets ===
- Shaykh Mustafa Takhtayi – (18th-century) Ardalani Kurdish poet.
- Ahmad Bag Komasi – (1796–1877) Ardalani Kurdish poet.
- Mastoureh Ardalan – (1805, Sanandaj – 1848, Sulaymaniyah) Kurdish poet, historian, and writer.
- Edeb – (1860 – 1918) Kurdish poet.
- Nari – (1874, Merivan-1944, Bilu) Kurdish poet.
- Abolqasem Lahouti – (12 October 1887, Kermanshah – 16 March 1957, Moscow) poet and political activist;Iranian-Soviet, maternal Kurdish.
- Qani – (1898, Mariwan – 1965) Kurdish poet.
- Rahim Moeini Kermanshahi – (6 February 1923, Kermanshah – 17 November 2015, Tehran) poet and lyricist.
- Shami Kermashani – (1927, Kermanshah – November 23, 1984, Kermanshah) poet.
- Suwara Ilkhanizada – (1937, Turjan – 14 January 1976, Tehran) Kurdish poet and writer.
- Jalal Malaksha – (1951, Malekshan-e Olya – 31 October 2020) Kurdish poet, writer, political activist, translator and journalist.
- Jila Hosseini – (22 September 1964, Saqqez – 27 September 1996) Kurdish poet, writer, researcher and radio announcer.
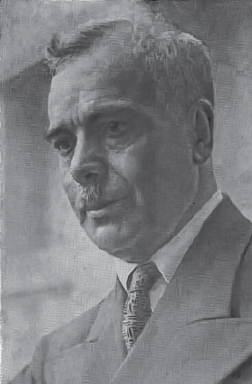
Abolqasem Lahouti
(1887–1957)

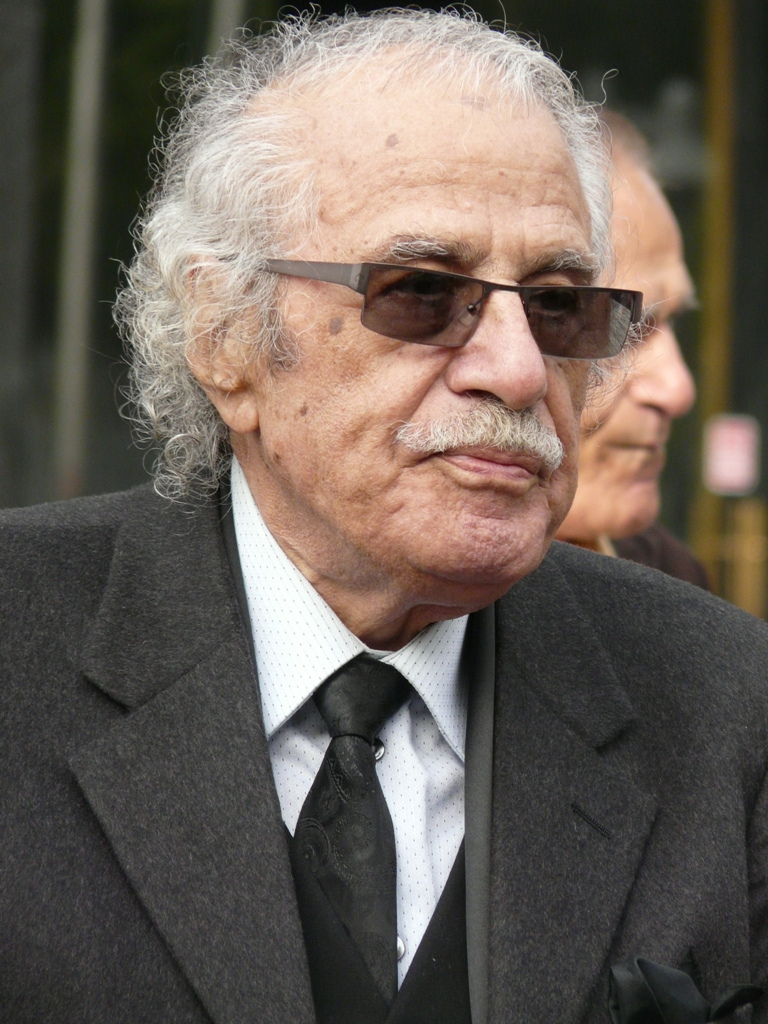
Rahim Moeini Kermanshahi
(1922–2015)

== Media ==
=== Journalists ===
- Hemin Mukriyani – (1921, Mahabad – 18 April 1986, Mahabad) journalist, poet, translator and literary critic.
- Roya Toloui – (22 May 1966) Baneh) democracy activist and journalist.
- Rahim Rashidi – (12 October 1978, Saqqez) journalist and correspondent of Kurdistan TV and Kurdistan 24.
- Behrouz Boochani – (23 July 1983) journalist, human rights defender, writer and film producer.
- Ardeshir Pashang – (22 December 1979) journalist, politician, researcher and human rights defender.
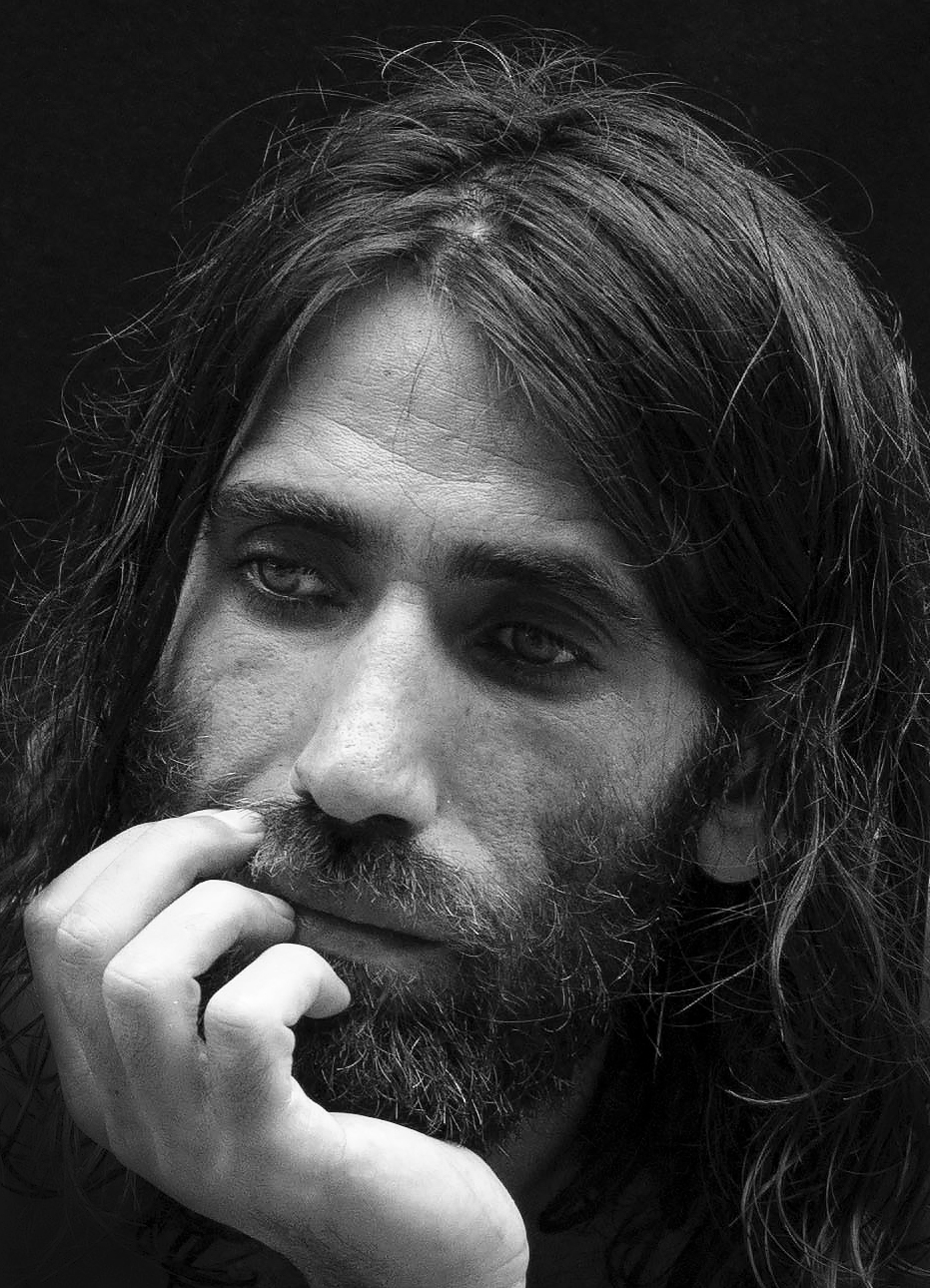
Behrouz Boochani
(1983)

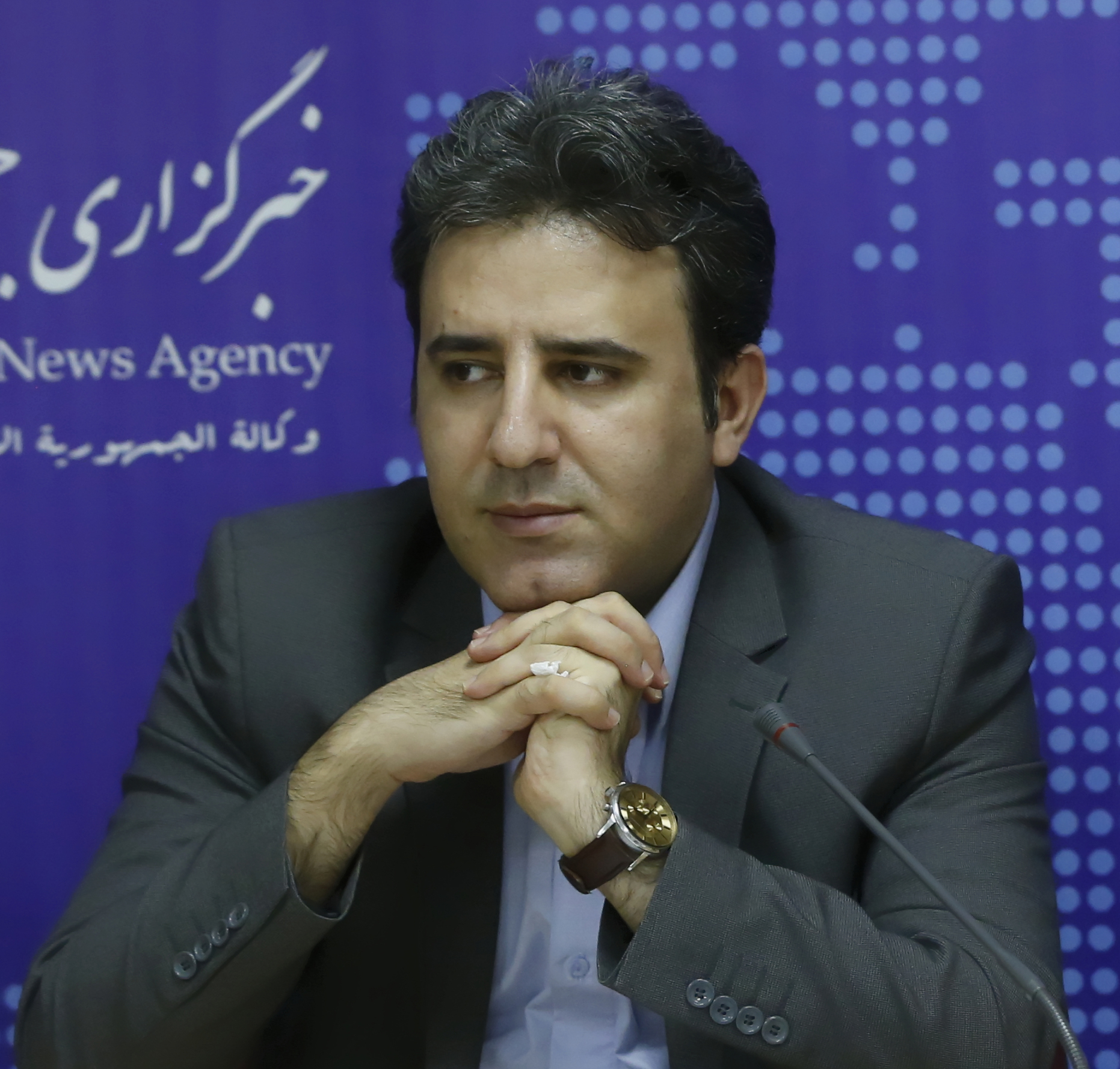
Ardeshir Pashang
(1979)

== Military ==
- Aziz Khan Mokri – (1792, Sardasht – 1871, Tabriz) Qajar military officer.
- Amar Khan Shikak – (1873, Zindasht) military leader and Shikak tribal chief.
- Shahram Irani – (1968, Sanandaj) military officer and navy commander.

== Politics and government ==
=== Activists ===
- Nasser Fahimi – (8 May 1974, Sanandaj) Human rights defender and political prisoner.
- Farzad Kamangar – (c. 1975 – 9 May 2010) executed teacher, poet, journalist, human rights activist and social worker.
- Sherko Moarefi – (1980, Baneh – 4 November 2013, Saqqez) activist and political prisoner.
- Ehsan Fatahian – (1982, Kermanshah – 11 November 2009, Sanandaj) activist and torture victim.
- Bahare Alavi – (1989, Saqqiz – 27 April 2011, Sanandaj) human rights activist, women's rights defender and blogger.
- Zara Mohammadi – (1990, Dehgolan) – cultural activist.
- Habibollah Latifi – (21 March 1982) activist and political prisoner.
- Sarou Ghahremani – (1993, Sanandaj – 12 January 2018) political prisoner.

=== Officials ===
Including tribesmen:

- Ali Beg Zanganeh – (16th-century) Safavid Zanganeh tribeman.
- Ganj Ali Khan – ( ? – 1624) 17th century Safavid military officer and provincial governor.
- Ali Mardan Khan – (? – April 1657) Safavid Kurdish military leader.
- Ali Khan Zanganeh – (? – 1689) Safavid grand vizier.
- Abdullah Pasha Bajalan – (18th-century) governor of the Pashlik of Zohab and chief of the Bajalan tribe during the mid-1700s.
- Shahqoli Khan Zanganeh – (18th-century) Safavid vizier.
- Allahqoli Khan Zanganeh – (? – 1785) Zandi official.
- Hasan Ali Khan Garrusi – (1820–1900) Qajar diplomat, officer, statesman, and literary figure.
- Faramarz Asadi – (1869, Arkavaz – 1969, Arkavaz) tribal chief of the Malekshahi, (Mir) prince of the Feyli Kurds.
- Haji Baba Sheikh – (1882 Bukan-30 March 1947, Mahabad) the prime minister of the Republic of Mehabad.
- Karim Sanjabi – (11 September 1905 – 4 July 1995) National Front politician and official.
- Yahya Sadeq Vaziri – (11 October 1911, Sanandaj – 30 January, 2013 Tehran) government official.
- Ghafour Youssefiani – (9 March 1928, Saqqez – 17 September 2018, Tehran) diplomat and Governor of Opec between 1958–1979.
- Mohammad Reza Rahimi – (11 January 1949, Serishabad, Qorveh) politician, prosecutor and academic.
- Bijan Namdar Zangeneh – (21 September 1952, Kermanshah) government minister at different cabinets.
- Saleh Adibi – (1964) – academic and diplomat.
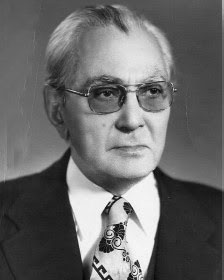
Karim Sanjabi
(1905–1995)

=== Parliament and party members ===
- Qazi Muhammad – (1 May 1893, Mahabad – 31 March 1947, Mahabad) Kurdish leader who founded the Democratic Party of Iranian Kurdistan in 1946.
- Abdul Rahman Heidari Ilami – (1925, Ilam – 1 January 1987, Qom) Member of Assembly of Experts.
- Abdul Rahman Haji Ahmadi – (1941, Mahabad) leader of Kurdistan Free Life Party (PJAK).
- Abdul Rahman Ghassemlou – (22 December 1930, Urmia – 13 July 1989, Vienna) Secretary-General of the Democratic Party of Iranian Kurdistan from 1973 to 1989.
- Sadegh Sharafkandi – (11 January 1938 – 17 September 1992) political activist and the Secretary-General of the PDKI.
- Mustafa Hijri – (1 January 1945, Naqadeh) Secretary-General of the Democratic Party of Iranian Kurdistan from 2004.
- Bahaedin Adab – (21 August 1945 – 16 August 2007) politician, engineer, member of the 5th and 6th of Islamic Consultative Assembly.
- Abdulla Mohtadi – (1949, Bukan) leader and secretary general of Komala Party of Iranian Kurdistan.
- Mohammad Hossein Karimi – (20 February 1949, Saqqez – 15 February 1979, Saqqez) one of the founders and the first leaders of Komala Party in Iran.
- Homayoun Ardalan – (2 February 1950, Saqqez – 17 September 1992, Berlin) Democratic Party of Iranian Kurdistan politician.
- Hassan Rahmanpanah – (1961) political activist, communist and a prominent member of both the Central Committee of Komalah (CPI) and the Communist Party of Iran.
- Shadieh Heydari – (15 May 1967, Saqqez) members of the Riksdag; Swedish-Iranian Kurdish.
- Amineh Kakabaveh – (6 December 1970, Saqqez) member of the Riksdag; Swedish-Iranian Kurdish.
- Shiva Ghasemipour – (1980, Mariwan) – member of the 11th Islamic Consultative Assembly.
- Majid Kavian – (1982. Baneh – 3 September 2011, Kutaman) PJAK and PKK member.
- Ramin Hossein-Panahi – (1995, Dehgolan – 8 September 2018, Gohardasht) political activist and Komala Party of Iranian Kurdistan member.
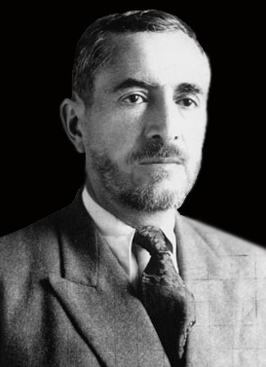
Qazi Muhammad
(1893–1947)

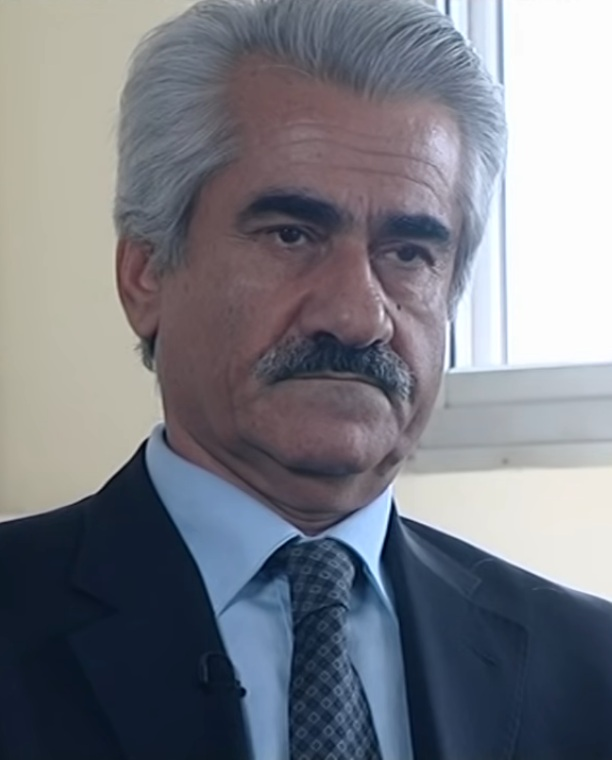
Mustafa Hijri
(1945)

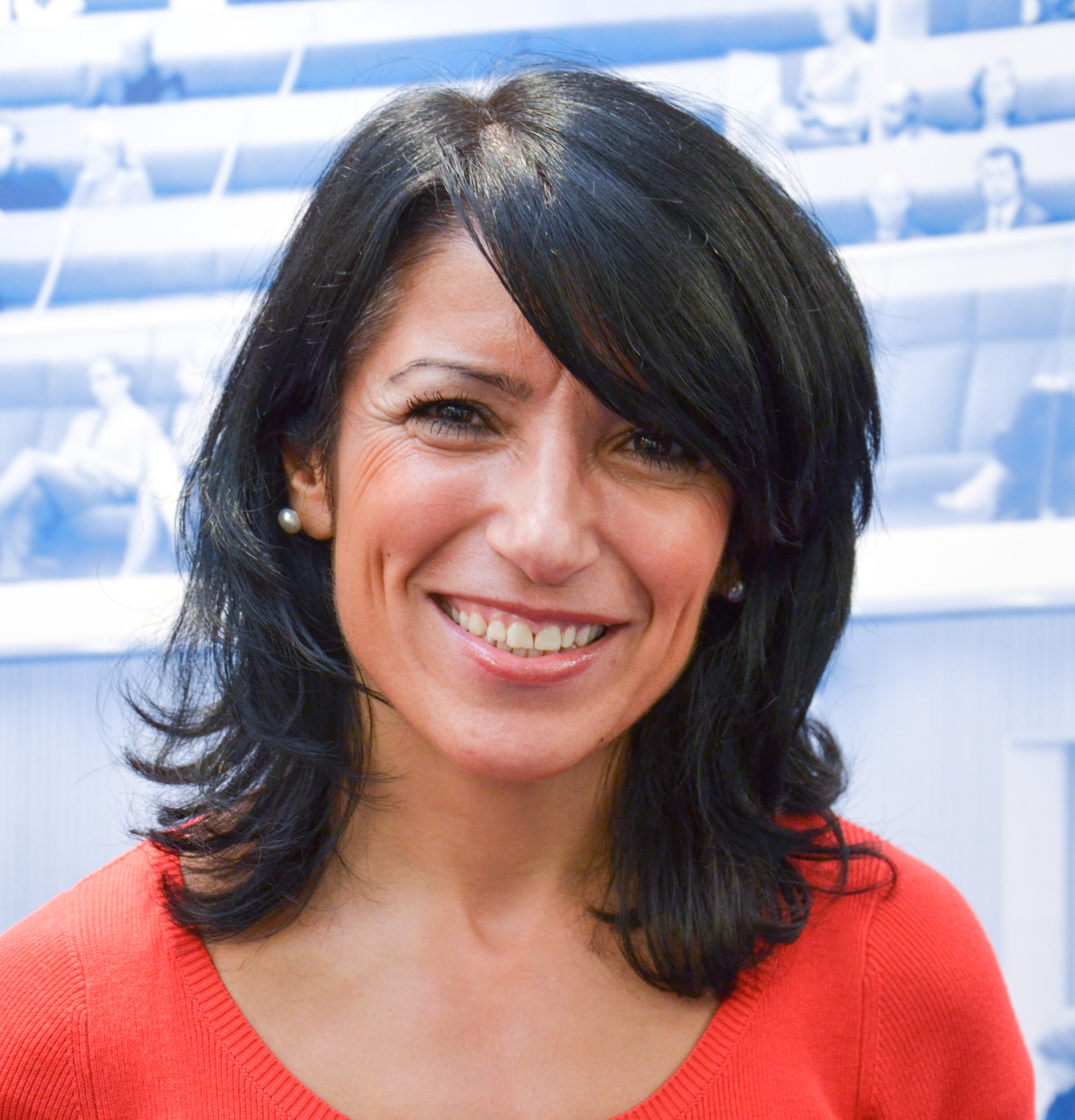
Amineh Kakabaveh
(1970)

== Religion ==
=== Islamic figures ===
- Abdolqader Zahedi – (1907 – 19 December 2005, Saqqez) Islamic jurist and political leader.
- Ezaddin Husseini – (26 May 1921, Baneh – 10 February 2011, Upsala) Islamic jurist and political leader.
- Assad Sheikholeslami Sanandaji – (1932 – 1 January 2020) Islamic scholar and professor.
- Ahmad Moftizadeh – (February 1933 – 9 February 1993) Islamic scholar.
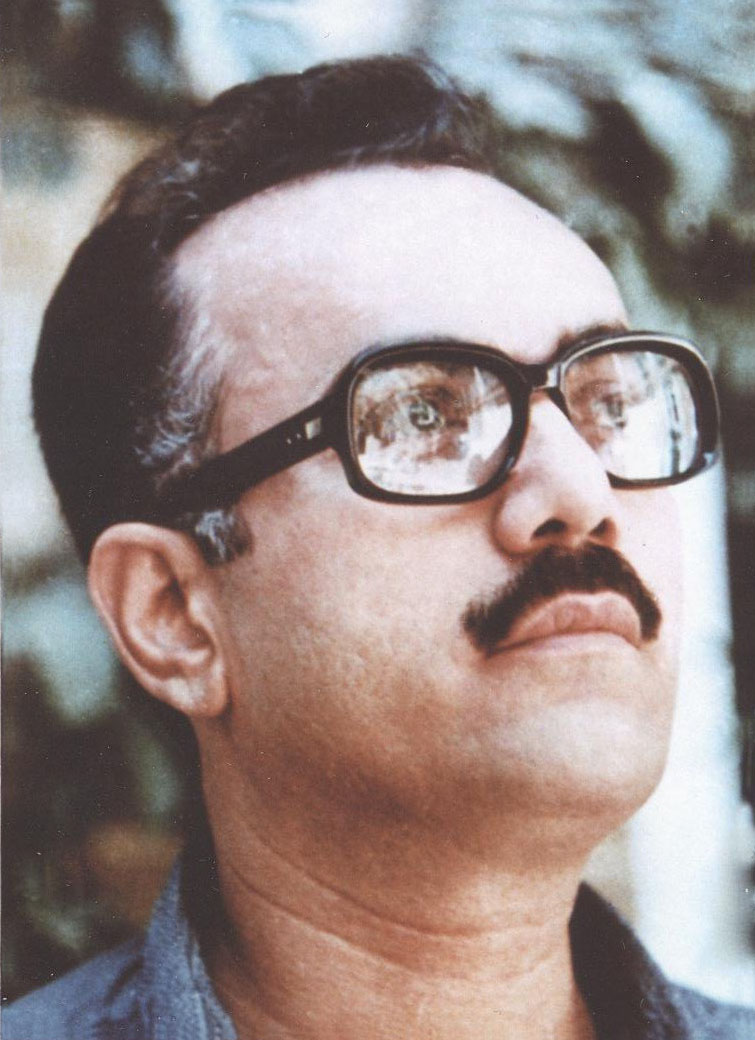
Ahmad Moftizadeh
(1933–1993)

=== Yarsanis ===
- Sultan Sahak – (fl. late 14th century to early 15th century) religious leader who reformed the modern beliefs of Yarsanism.
- Hajj Nematollah – (1871, Jeyhunabad – 28 February 1919, Jeyhunabad) Yarsani mystic and religious leader.

== Sports ==
=== Individual sports ===
==== Combat sports ====
- Bijan Batmani – (22 December 1972, Kermanshah) boxer.
- Makwan Amirkhani – (8 November 1988, Kermanshah) mixed martial artist, Iranian Kurdish-Finnish.

===== Wrestling =====
- Sardar Pashaei – (12 May 1979, Saqqez)
- Saman Tahmasebi – (26 July 1985, Sanandaj)
- Yousef Ghaderian – (14 February 1993, Saqqez)

===== Weightlifting =====
- Kianoush Rostami – (23 July 1991, Kermanshah) strength athlete and Olympic weightlifter.

==== Paralympic athletes ====
- Siamand Rahman – ( 21 March 1988 – 1 March 2020) Paralympic powerlifter.

=== Team sports ===
- Homa Hosseini – (22 December 1988, Kermanshah) rower.

==== Basketball ====
- Hamed Sohrabnejad – (7 May 1983, Sanandaj)

==== Football ====
- Nouri Khodayari – (27 March 1944, Baghdad – 6 March 2013, Ahvaz) midfielder; Fayli Kurd, Iranian-Iraqi.
- Bijan Zolfaghar-Nasab – (7 June 1949, Sanandaj) retired football player and manager.
- Mohammad Nouri – (9 January 1983, Sonqor) midfielder.
- Voria Ghafouri – (18 September 1987, Sanandaj) right-back and right winge.
- Mostafa Ahmadi – (14 March 1988, Baneh) midfielder.
- Shahab Karami – (16 March 1991, Kermanshah) defensive midfielder.
- Nima Doroudi – (9 January 1991, Sanandaj) forward.
- Koroush Maleki – (9 May 1991, Ravansar) goalkeeper.
- Bakhtiar Rahmani – (23 September 1991, Sarpol-e Zahab) attacking midfielder.
- Zahra Ghanbari – (4 March 1992, Kangavar) forward.
- Kaveh Rezaei – (5 April 1992, Eslamabad-e Gharb) footballer.
- Yaser Feyzi – (27 July 1992) winger.
- Vahid Heydarieh – (1 January 1993) defender.
- Zobeir Niknafs – (12 April 1993, Sanandaj) midfielder.
- Sirvan Ghorbani – (26 September 1993, Kamyaran) defender.
- Aram Abbasi – (13 Jul 1994, Sanandaj) defender.
- Iman Salimi – (1 June 1996, Kermanshah) defender.
- Sina Asadbeigi – (17 July 1997, Sarpol-e Zahab) midfielder.
- Mehdi Mehdikhani – (28 July 1997, Kermanshah) professional footballer.
- Zakaria Moradi – (14 August 1998, Karaj) winger.
- Mohammad Omri – (11 March 2000, Urmia) winger.
- Fardin Rabet – (29 October 2001, Piranshahr) winger.
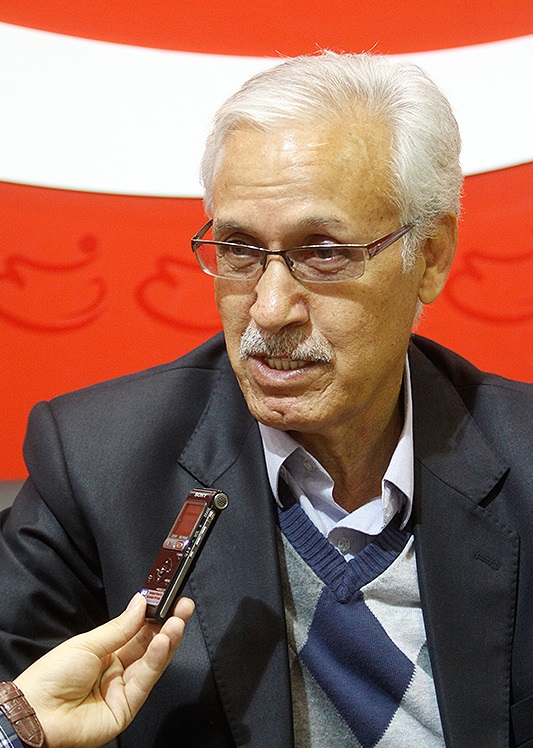
Bijan Zolfaghar-Nasab
(1949)

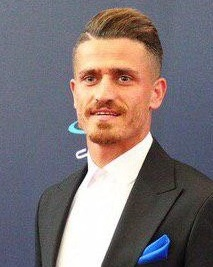
Voria Ghafouri
(1987)

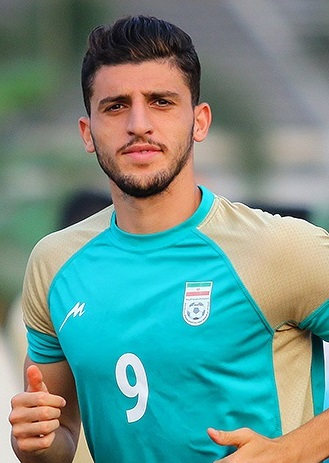
Mehdi Mehdikhani
(1997)

== Miscellaneous ==
- Hossein Kohkan – (28 September 1930, Darvaleh-ye Pain, Kermanshah – 26 July 2016, Banevreh, Kermanshah) natural architect.
- Fateme Asadi – (1960, Bagherabad village, Divandarreh – 1984) victim of Iran–Iraq war.
- Sane Jaleh – (22 May 1985, Paveh – 14 February 2011, Tehran) protester and one of two students shot dead during the February 14, 2011 demonstrations in support of Arab Spring.
- Reza Barati – (1991 – 17 February 2014, Los Negros Island) asylum seeker who was killed during rioting at the Manus Island Regional Processing Centre (MIRPC), Papua New Guinea.
- Mohammad Moradi – (1984 – 26 December 2022) student and suicidal protester.
- Rahim Rostami – (16 June 1991, Narest) refugee.
- Mosleh Zamani – (? – 17 December 2009) executed citizen for having an "illicit relationship with his girlfriend" when he was 17 years old.
- Mahsa Amini – (21 September 1999 Saqqez – 16 September 2022, Tehran) victim of the Guidance Patrol, the religious morality police of Iran's government.
- Shivan Qaderi – (? – 9 July 2005, Mahabad) murder victim.

== See also ==
- List of Iranians
- List of Kurds
- List of Iranian Azerbaijanis
