= Rahim Rashidi =

Kurdistan journalist

- Born: Rahim Rashidi; October 12, 1978 (age 47); Saqqez, Rojhalat, Iran
- Years active: 1996–present
- Notable credit(s): Tishk TV Correspandent (1987–1988); Kurdistan TV the Chief Correspondent (2018–present)
- Political party: Kurdistan Democratic Party (Iran)

Rahim Rashidi (Kurdish: ڕەحیم; born 1978ڕەشیدی) is an Iranian-Kurdish journalist and correspondent of Kurdistan TV and Kurdistan 24. He was born in 1978 in Markhoz village, Saqqez, Iran. In 2018, U.S. President Donald Trump nicknamed him Mr. Kurd for his active coverage of Kurds events in the Middle East and the fight against ISIS and his participation in White House news conferences.

== Biography ==
Rahim Rashidi started his career as a Peshmerga in Kurdistan Democratic Party (Iran). Than after that he became a human rights activist, writer, and journalist. For this reason he has been interviewed by many local and international media, press, radio and television agencies on local, and global political, historical, and social issues and affairs. Rashidi is married to Helin Sindy, an Iraqi-Kurdish Translator. They share no children.

== Activities ==
Rashidi began journalism in 1996 working for "Voice of Iranian Kurdistan" Radio and "Kurdistan" Newspaper. In 2004 he became a member of the editorial team of "Rêjwan" magazine in Sweden, publishing in Swedish and Kurdish. From 2006 to 2010, Rahim was a member of the board of directors and the editor of the news department for Tishk TV, located in Paris, France. Rashidi has been a member of the Swedish Union of Journalists and the International Federation of Journalists. He is currently a member of the Foreign Press Center (FPC) of the US State Department and a member of the Foreign Press Correspondents in the USA (AFPC-USA Club). Additionally, Rashidi has been actively involved with the Kurdistan Human Rights Watch and the Leadership Council for Human Rights in the United States since 2010. He wrote an article “What do the Kurds Want and Why They are Oppressed” for the Contemporary Social Issues book, published in the United States in English and Persian.

Rashidi went on to be Chief Correspondent for Kurdistan24 and Kurdistan TV in Washington, DC. He also oversaw the operations of Zagros TV's Arabic section. He is also a member of the Gold Institute for International Strategy, and a consulting advisor to several companies and establishments in Washington, DC.

== Translation work ==
Rashidi has translated literary, political, and social articles into Kurdish, including the following:

- In Africa it's Always Midsummer
- The Principles of a Democratic State, Peaceful and Civil Struggle
- Women's Rights
- Human Rights
