= Markhoz (disambiguation) =

Markhoz may refer to:

- Maraz goat, a species of goat indigenous to Kurdistan
- Markhoz, a village in Kurdistan, Iran
