= Nari (poet) =

Kurdish poet (1874–1944)

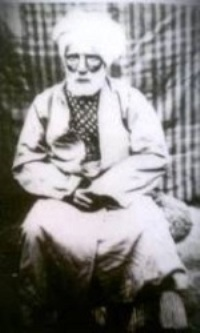
A photo of Nari

Nari (Kurdish: ناری, romanized: Narî; 1874-1944) is the pen name for Mela Kake Heme, a Kurdish poet. He was born and died in Marivan. He had a close relationship to Mahmud Barzanji, Taher Begi Jaf and Qani.

== Nari's poetry ==
Nari wrote lyric and mystic poems in Kurdish and Persian. The bulk of his poems are in the form of ghazal. He was mostly influenced by Nalî and Mahwi among Kurdish poets and by Hafez among Persian poets.
