= Rashid Fayznejad =

Kurdish singer

Rashid Fayznejad ڕەشید فەیزنژاد
- Born: 25 July 1950 (age 76); Saqqez, Iran
- Genre: Kurdish Folk Music
- Occupations: Composer, singer, violinist
- Instruments: Violin
- Years active: 1960s-present

Rashid Fayznejad (Kurdish: ڕەشید فەیزنژاد, Reşîd Feyznejad, born 25 July 1950) is a Kurdish singer, composer and violinist. His songs and music are composed in the style of Kurdish folk music and in all two dialects of Sorani and Kurmanji which is a reference and pure music in the Kurdish music collection.

== Personal life ==
Rashid Fayznejad was born to a Kurdish family in Iranian Kurdistan, Rojhalat, but has lived most of his life exiled in the Kurdish diaspora, mainly Finland. He was born in Arab Ughluy-e Olya village in Saqqez city. He completed his primary education in Saqqez. He learned to play Ney and Setar from his father. He had an art-loving family that was very influential in his orientation and he was into the art of music. His interest in music was such that he focused on playing other musical instruments such as flute, daf and violin. Finally, he chose the violin as his specialty.

He has been active in the field of Kurdish music for more than fifty years and has collaborated with many artists, musicians and singers in Kurdistan, including Nasser Razazi, Mohammad Mamle, Mohammad Nahid, Sediq Zohri, Hassan Darzi, Qader Eliassy and others. He has given many concerts in Europe and America for the Kurds living there.

He has also continuously collaborated with radio and television centers such as Mahabad, Sanandaj, Kurdistan TV, Roj TV and Tishk TV, etc. After the Iranian Revolution and the events in Kurdistan, he became severely restricted in his music activities and was forced to work for the Saqqez Education Organization for a living. He was eventually forced to leave Iran and live in exile outside of Kurdistan.

== Discography ==
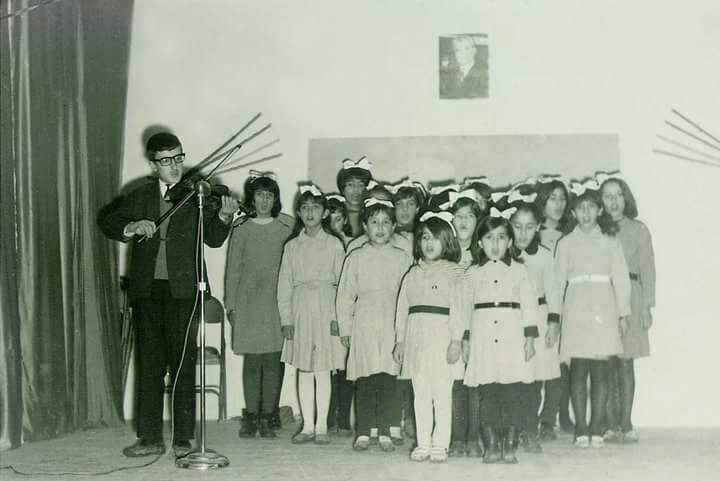
A school music group in Saqqez in 1960s

Some of his most famous songs are: (selective)

- Sawza (سەوزە)
- Vahatawa peshmarga (واهاتەوە پێشمەرگە)
- Mangi chvarda (مانگی چواردە)
- Soora gol (سوورە گوڵ)
- Mastoora (مەستوورە)
- Taza golakai dazgiran (تازە گوڵەکەی دەزگیران)
- Ba einvani (بە عینوانی)
- Hi maro maro (هەی مەڕۆ مەڕۆ)
- Azizakam (عەزیزەکەم)
- Khaldari (خاڵداری)
- Karkook (کەرکووک)
- Dlakam ghamgina (دڵەکەم غەمگینە)
- Rehaney Jwanm (رێحانەکەی جوانم)
- Bawan Giyan (باوان گیان)
- Tayarakay Garmein (تەیارەکەی گەرمێن)
- Shirin gyan (شیرین گیان)
- Kurdistan (کوردستان)
- Ba rebvart bm (بە رێبوارت بم)
