= Ghafour Youssefiani =

Governor of Opec between 1958–1979

- غفور یوسفیانی
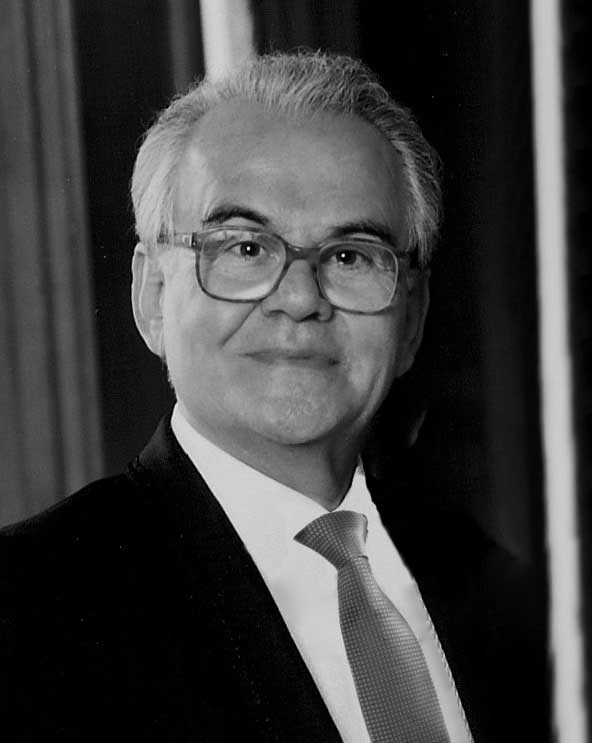
- Photo of Ghafour Youssefiani, Washington DC 1995
- Born: 9 March 1928; Saqqez, Kurdistan, Iran
- Died: 17 September 2018 (aged 90); Tehran, Iran
- Citizenship: Iran
- Title: A diplomat, Governor to OPEC and the National Iranian Oil Company (NIOC) representative to Japan
- Term: 1958–1979

Ghafour Youssefiani (1928–2018) was a diplomat, Governor to OPEC (the Organization of Petroleum Exporting Countries), a petrochemical engineer, and the National Iranian Oil Company (NIOC) representative to Japan.

== Family and education ==
Ghafour Youssefiani born on March 19, 1928, was the first child of Mirza Ahmad Youssefiani, born in Saqqez, Iran, into a Saqqez-based Iranian family of Kurdish heritage. After completing his preliminary education in Saqqez and Hamadan, in 1948 he obtained his high school diploma in mathematics from the "Jordan College" (Alborz Highschool) preparatory boarding school, in Tehran, under the tutelage of Mohamad Ali Mojtahedi. In 1959 he received an engineering degree in "Oil Exploration and Excavation," from the Petroleum University of Technology in Abadan, Iran and later pursuit advanced degrees, in Petrochemicals at The Hague, The Netherlands and the United Kingdom, respectively. ^{[1]}

== Professional experience ==
In 1958, as a member of Abadan Refinery's Center for Petrochemical Engineering, he initiated a number of innovations, including an innovative formulation for the production of JP4 (Jet Fuel), which until 1995 was used world-wide to fuel fighter jets. Also, in 1960, he pioneered the usage and application of computer systems, automating the control and calibration of Iran's petroleum production and refining systems, a world first.

From 1969 to 1974, Youssefiani was appointed as the first Chief Executive of the National Iranian Oil Company's (NIOC) Far East headquarters, based in Tokyo, Japan, marking the beginning of Iran's strategic economic and energy relations with the Far East. At the time, he also founded and served as the first head of the "Iran-Japan-Korea Economic and Energy Council."

Subsequent to his mission to Tokyo, he was appointed as the "Chief of OPEC Affairs" at NIOC's headquarters in Tehran, Iran, a position he held until the Iranian revolution in 1979. During that period, he headed Iran's delegations to the Organization of Petroleum Exporting Countries (OPEC), served as deputy to Minister Jamshid Amouzegar and served multiple terms on OPEC's Board of Governors, in Vienna, Austria.

After the Iranian Revolution of 1978, he continued his research and development of Oil and Gas projects for Iran. In 1998 he proposed an innovative process to capture and convert refinery by-products into Synthetic Natural Gas (SNG) to produce petrochemicals to eliminate Iran's costly imports, thereby enabling Iran's self-reliance on its own petroleum industry.

== Hostage at OPEC siege by Carlos the Jackal ==
On December 22, 1975, he was taken hostage along with Iran's Minister Jamshid Amouzegar, Zaki Yamani (Saudi Arabian Oil Minister) and twelve other Oil Ministers in a terror attack on OPEC headquarters in Vienna, Austria. Masterminded by Ilich Ramírez Sánches, known as "Carlos the Jackal," the OPEC siege left several dead. The hostage crisis came to an end, in Algiers, Algeria after several days, multiple flights to several countries, payment of $60 million, by Iran and Saudi Arabia, all mediated personally by then Algerian President Houari Boumédièan.

== After the Iranian Revolution of 1979 ==
After the Iranian Revolution of 1979 he was charged by Iran's Supreme Islamic Revolutionary Prosecutor of having "maintained relations with foreign governments and organizations, and for being instrumental in promoting policies of the Pahlavi Dynasty." He was convicted to eight years of incarceration at the Ghezel Hesar penitentiary. Subsequent to serving out his term, he lived in Iran and the United States, and died at the age of 90, from Alzheimer, in Tehran, Iran.

== Personal life ==
Equestrian was one of his personal passions. Having learned riding during his youth in Iran's Kurdistan, he continued raising and training horses, at the Abadan Equestrian Club, during his years of studies and employment in Abadan, Iran. During that period he regularly participated in club and international competitions, specializing in Polo, Dressage and Show Jumping.^{[1]}

Married twice, he is survived by two sons, Mehrdad Marty (from Mastaneh Parvaresh, granddaughter of Pirzadeh Naeini) and Ahmadali (from Keyhan Motazedi, daughter of Khan Baba Motazedi), and a grandson, Dariush Raymond Youssefiani.^{[2]}
