= Rahim Rostami =

Iranian-born Norwegian asylum seeker

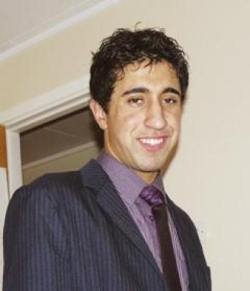
- Born: 16 June 1991 (age 34); Narest, Kurdistan, Iran

Rahim Rostami (born 16 June 1991 in Narest, Iran) is an Iran-born asylum seeker who became known to the public in Norway via national TV station NRK in the investigative journalism "NRK Brennpunkt" programs where he in twice appeared in programs focusing on Senjehesten Asylum Seeker Reception Center where he came forward as spokesperson for criticism from the residents. The Brennpunkt programs pointed out unacceptable conditions at this reception center, which was later closed-down.

Following the Brennpunkt programs, Rostami and three other residents were moved to another reception center, allegedly to regain calm at the center.

Rostami came to Norway as a minor. His asylum application was based on fear of persecution and the consequences of a death penalty following an in absentia judgement in Iran that he became aware of after he fled. The Norwegian Norwegian Directorate of Immigration (UDI) and the Immigration Appeals Board (UNE) found the documentation to not be credible, and turned down the asylum application.

As Rostami attempted to open a bank account, the bank notified the immigration authorities, and he was arrested by the National Police Immigration Service and deported to Teheran, where he was handed over to Iranian authorities, who imprisoned him in Evin prison with a bail option that was shortly after withdrawn.

== Status ==
Rostami was imprisoned in Evin prison, Teheran from 10, 2011 to 20 June 2011, when he was released on bail to await trial.

In June 2011, Rostami's attorney Cecilie Schjatvet said: "There is no doubt that the death penalty against Rahim Rostami is real". The bail sum was almost 90,000 Euro.

== Background ==
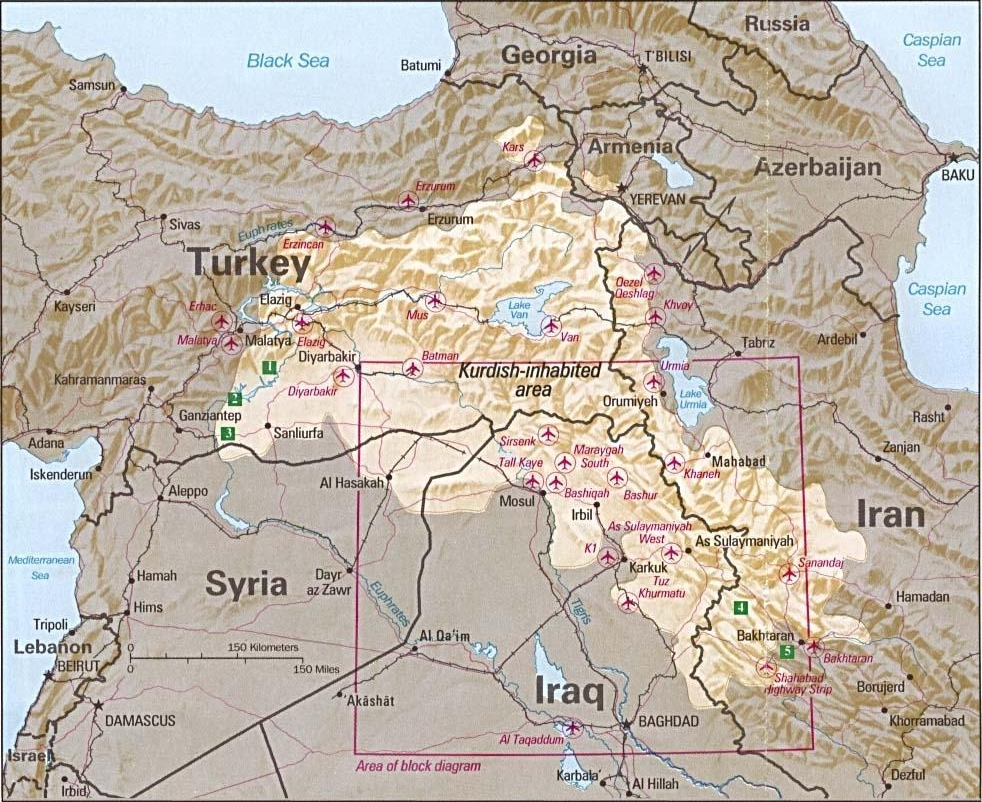
Rahim Rostami grew up in Iranian Kurdistan

Rostami comes from the village Narest in the western Iran. He came to Norway 17 years old as an unaccompanied minor. Rahim fled from Iran in August 2008, via Turkey and Greece to Norway, and applied for asylum in October 2008.

According to article in the weekly magazine Ny Tid the asylum application was in part founded on an in absentia judgement from Iran that UDI and UNE considered false, and consequently did not take into consideration in the evaluation of the asylum application.

During his first year at the reception center, Rostami learned Norwegian. During a public meeting at Skrolsvik on the island of Senja, he held an appeal in Norwegian on the unacceptable conditions at the reception center.

== Asylum application in Norway ==
Rostami applied for asylum in Norway 12 October 2008. His application was initially evaluated and turned down by the Norwegian Directorate of Immigration (UDI) 9 October 2009, and the rejection was sustained by the Norwegian Immigration Appeals Board 5. July 2010. Rostami was then ordered to leave the country within 4 August 2010. A revocation request was filed, but the Immigration Appeals Board sustained their decision 9 February 2011, the same date he was detained by the National Police Immigration Service. He was deported to Iran the next day.

== Senjehesten asylum reception center / support from the locals ==
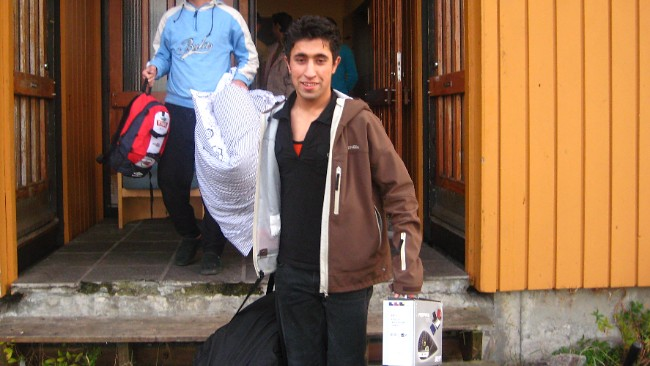
Rahim leaves Senjehesten reception center 3 November 2009

Rostami became known to Norwegian media through the national TV station NRK, in the investigative journalism "Brennpunkt" programs where he in twice appeared in programs focusing on Senjehesten Asylum Seeker Reception Center. The center had received extensive criticism for that the center manager countered in both programs and also later. The criticism focused on the center manager running illegal shop activities in the center, reprehensible conditions in the sanitary installations, inadequate technical maintenance, lacking activation opportunities, that a driver (already paid to do the job) demanded payment for driving residents to the nearest village Finnsnes, and that the center manager was insufficiently available. Prior to the opening of the center, the locals had warned UDI against giving operating permit to a person that was previously convicted for economic crimes and had run bankrupt several times. A person formerly in charge of activities at Senjehesten that was dismissed from his position and tok the dismissal to the court was awarded his job back, and a financial compensation. Senjehesten reception center was later closed down following continuous dissatisfaction from UDI regarding how the center was run. Following the Brennpunkt program showing 18-year-old Rostami in front of an enthusiastic audience at a public meeting, he and three other residents was ordered to move from the center against own wish, and instead sent to Oscarsgata reception center in Vadsø. Rostami's former guardian Frode Olsen reacted strongly on the moving order, and opened his home for free for Rostami, who then lost his financial support from UDI when moving out of the center.

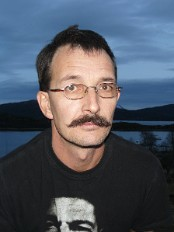
Former guardian Frode Olsen

– Rahim has never been involved in any episodes at the reception center. He has behaved exemplary. All he has done is to be spokesperson for the asylum seekers at Senjehesten. That is why they ordered him to Vadsø, Frode Olsen said to NRK.

== Arrest, imprisonment and deportation ==
While the immigration authorities processed the revocation request towards the UNE rejection, Rostami lived with friends in the Oslo region. In February 2011, a bank notified the immigration authorities that Rostami attempted to open a bank account bankkonto. He was detained in the bank by the National Police Immigration Service 9 February 2011, the same day UNE rejected the revocation request. After one night at Trandum Detention Center Rostami was deported to Teheran with police escort 10 February 2011, arriving 11. February at around 1 pm. He was there handed over to Iranian authorities, who immediately arrested him.

== Imprisonment in Iran ==
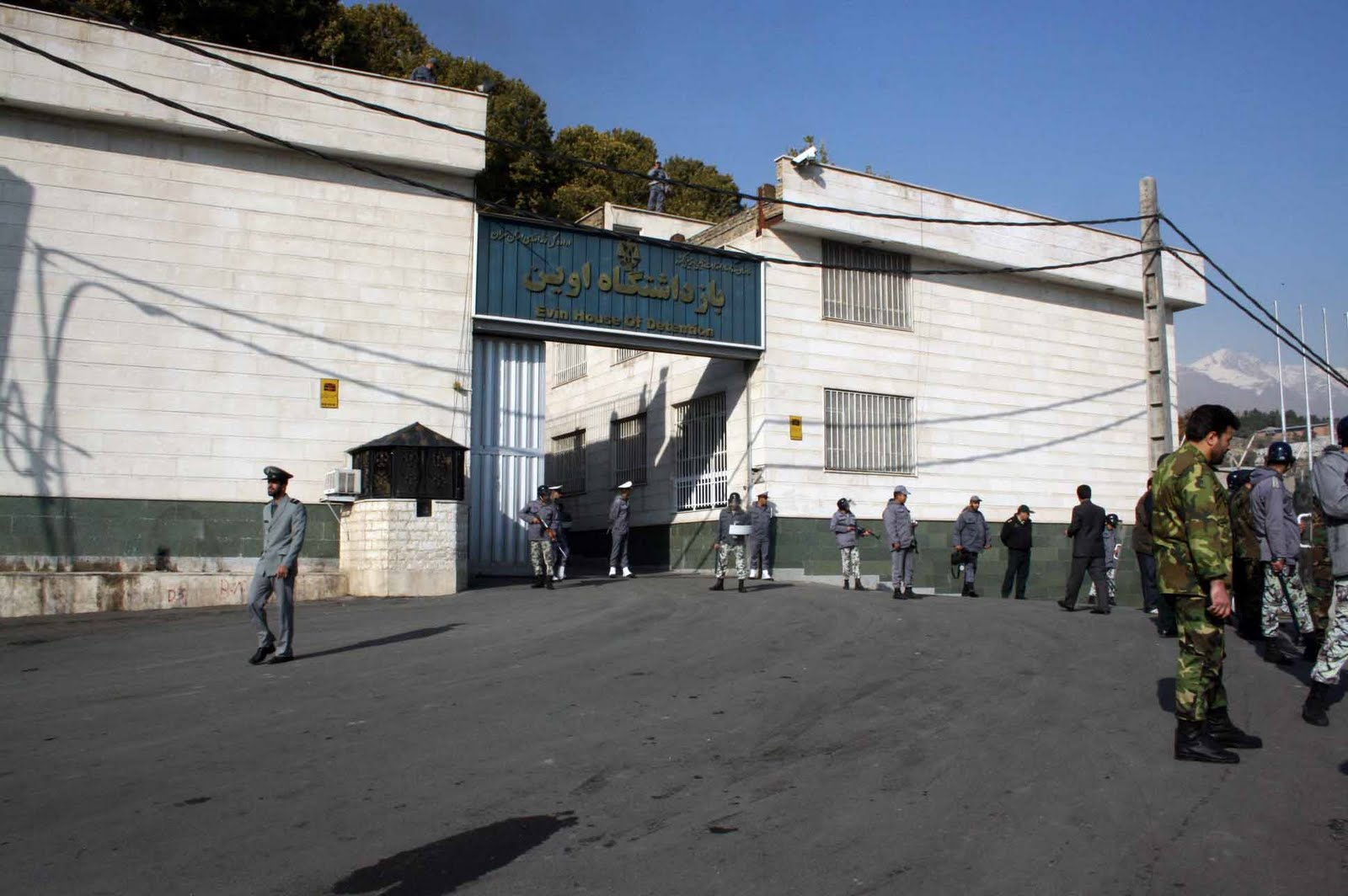
Evin prison

Rostami was immediately detained after hand-over to Iranian authorities at Teheran Khomeini airport, and transported to Evin prison, a known torture prison north west of Teheran where regime critics are held. The prison is notorious for torturing political prisoners, initially documented in 2004 by Human Rights Watch in the report "Like the Dead in Their Coffins": Torture, Detention, and the Crushing of Dissent in Iran published on the web page of the United Nations High Commissioner for Refugees.

Rostamis family was 1. March 2011 notified that he was imprisoned against a bail sum of 10 million rials (almost 90 000 Euro), an enormous sum, but was two weeks later notified that the bail option was withdrawn, as Rostami was indicted for «crimes against national security». He is said to have spent several weeks in solitary confinement in Evin prison.

== Iranian authorities' actions against potential regime opponents ==
Symbol of the 2009 Green Movement

Iranian authorities have since the 2009 election tightened the grip around oppositional groups and individuals, and hits hard down on anyone suspected of disloyalty against the regime. Asylum seekers are pointed out as a group that by fleeing from Iran has shown such disloyalty, which is documented by The Norwegian Country of Origin Information Centre - Landinfo in a note published on their web site 19. April 2011.

Iranian surveillance of opposition groups in Norway has been known for years, and the Iranian objectives of such surveillance is assumed to be to monitor and hinder any opposition against Iran in Europe. The activities of spies among Iranian asylum seekers in Norway has at several occasions been referred in Norwegian media, lately in a report at national TV broadcaster NRK 30 March 2011, around six weeks after Rahim Rostamis was deported. It describes how Iranian authorities attempt to recruit asylum seekers in Norway in order to infiltrate political exile groups in Norway.

The Iranian embassy in Oslo denied this categorically in a press release 1. April 2011 where they say that this is fiction influenced by the Zionist lobby, and that the purpose is to undermine the bilateral relations between Norway and Iran.

== Reactions to the Rostami case in the public ==
=== Reactions from engaged individuals ===
The xenophobia expressed by some persons in the village of Skrollsvika on island of Senja felt when the asylum center was established was turned to a concern for the welfare or the residents of Senjehesten reception center. Following the first Brennpunkt program UDI ordered the center to arrange a public information meeting, where the strong local concerns for the conditions at the center were expressed.

The local reactions after the deportation of Rostami have also been strong. After the case became national news, mainly through the articles of the weekly magazine Ny Tid, social media have been used extensively in the engagement for Rostami's case, both on Facebook and in the more serious Norwegian internet discussion forums such as NyeMeninger.no and Verdidebatt.no:

- "Roaring silence on Rahim Rostami"
- "Regime criticism in Norway"
- "The research competence of Faremo"
- "Immigration authorities need quality assurance!"
- "Evicted by force to prison in Iran - demand for imminent action"
- "UNE a human rights organization!"
- "Confidence is dependent on fair treatment"
- "Monitoring at deportations is the law"
- "UNE claims without basis – sim sala bim!"

Characteristic for the engagement amongst those who know Rostami is the letter 9-year-old Torgeir sent to the King: "We have been told that his life is in danger and I am very afraid that they will hurt him in the prison".

In a note on her blog, author and former paperless and evicted Maria Amelie describes how the situation of the paperless has become visible in an entirely new way, referring amongst other to Rahim Rostami:

"Less than a year ago there were no organizations, Facebook groups, very few that followed up asylum cases such as with Rahim Rostami where they remembered his birthday while he was in a prison. There was little knowledge to the paperless subclass. Today so much is different. [Information on the] paperless are in the media and on the streets - Palestinians, Iranians and Ethiopians. People that regardless of nationality has a strong association to Norway. People that regardless of the quality of their papers do not want to leave a country that they have become fond of. That gives me hope. Because one thing is when the paperless and their opinions become visible and they dear to come forward with their stories. Another thing is when the people of Norway become engaged on their behalf and also no longer wants to be invisible."

=== Reactions from NGOs ===
Several Norwegian Non-governmental organizations mentioned Rahim Rostamis case as it became publicly known. When UNE director Terje Sjeggestad in an interview in the Rostami case with Ny Tid 8 April 2011 claimed that the Immigrations Appeal Board (UNE) is "a human rights organization with more competence on the area than other organizations in Norway", it triggered strong reactions from Amnesty Norway, the Norwegian Centre for Human Rights and the Norwegian Helsinki Committee for Human Rights.

A line of Norwegian NGOs (Antirasistisk Senter, Norsk Folkehjelp, Norsk Organisasjon for Asylsøkere (NOAS), Selvhjelp for innvandrere og flyktninger (SEIF), Den norske Helsingforskomité, Redd Barna, Peoplepeace, Rådgivningsgruppa i Trondheim, KFUK-KFUM Global og Juridisk rådgivning for kvinner (JURK)) on 7. April 2011 made a joint petition to Norwegian authorities with three demands:

1. Norwegian engagement and pressure on Iranian authorities to get Rahim Rostami out of prison
2. Stop deportations to Iran until a review of the Rostami case had been done
3. Upon his release, get Rahim Rostami safely back to Norway

In addition, several of those organizations made statements on their web pages: :

NOAS - Norwegian Organization for Asylum Seekers

- NOAS comments on the Rahim case 29 March 2011
- NOAS reacts on Rostami-statement 20 April 2011

Peoplepeace.org

- Teenager imprisoned after being deported to Iran 23.03.2011

Iran Human Rights

- A Kurdish asylum seeker extradited from Norway to Iran is in danger of torture and ill-treatment at Tehran’s Evin prison

=== Reactions in national media ===
Synne Skouen in Aftenposten
Why are Strasbourg [European Court of Human Rights] rulings needed before the advice of our own human rights' experts are heard? Do we have to accept «errors» sending life scared 19-year olds back to prison and death?
What does it take before "the cup is full"?

Human rights lawyer Mohammad Mostafaei in Dagbladet
It is known that Rostami was politically active, and Iran performs massive surveillance of Iranians in Norway, it is therefore incomprehensible that they could return Rostami to Iran.

Former guardian Frode Olsen at NRK
We don't know what is happening. We hear scary stories from Iranian prisons. I am very worried for him.

Mahmood Amiry-Moghaddam, leader of Iran Human Rights, to weekly magazine Ny Tid
This is decidedly the most serious case we have seen. All signals say that Rostami is in acute risk of his life. We ask Norwegian authorities to do all that is in their power to save his life.

Secretary of state in Ministry of Justice and Public Security Pål Lønseth to weekly magazine Ny Tid
The Department of Justice has requested from the Immigration Appeals Board (UNE) a statement on this case. UNE has reported they are working on verifying whether the claims are correct. I am satisfied with that. It is a serious matter if it should be shown that misjudgments have led to the return of a person in need of protection.

Human rights advocate Mahmood Amiry-Moghaddam to Iran Human Rights
It is not clear what charges are raised against him, but the fact that the Iranian authorities have refused to release him on bail indicates that his case is serious.
Iranian authorities have recently signalized that Iranians who have sought asylum abroad should be charged for "dissemination of false propaganda against the Islamic Republic of Iran" and punished for that. This means that seeking asylum by itself could be a reason for the Iranian authorities to subject the asylum seekers who are extradited to Iran, to persecution, imprisonment and ill-treatment.

Human rights advocate Mahmood Amiry-Moghaddam to Nettavisen
We do not know the charges against him, but the fact that he is held in Evin without bail option is very serious. We know how easy it is for Iranian authorities to execute people.

UNE-director Terje Sjeggestad in Aftenposten
Synne Skouen i her article 6. April made uncritical claims that 19-year-old Rahim Rostami has been returned to persecution in Iran.

Terje Sjeggestad is known for his harsh reactions towards criticism:

- He was in 2007 quoted on having contacted several Members of Parliament on telephone: Sjeggestad scolded Members of Parliament - Aftenposten 5. July 2007
- In 2010 he was strongly criticized in Aftenposten by Communications Director Martin Apenes of the Norwegian Labour and Welfare Administration (NAV) for having published a "defence speech" on www.une.no, as was done in the Rostami case: Ugly thing, UNE - Aftenposten 1. April 2010

Human rights advocate Mahmood Amiry-Moghaddam to Nettavisen
The new indictment against him is based on his participation to opposition meetings while he was in Norway. This shows that Iranian authorities monitor the activities of Iranians abroad, and uses it against them when they return to the country. Norwegian authorities must take into account such potential consequences when deporting Iranian asylum seekers to Iran.

Attorney Cecilie Schjatvet to weekly magazine Ny Tid ( English translation)
There is no doubt that the indictment and death penalty against Rahim Rostami are real, and that the return to Iran has put his life at risk. The Rahim case demonstrates that the methods used by Norwegian immigration authorities in this case to verify whether a person is in need of protection or not, are unsuitable. Even if Rostami has been sent out of the country, Norway has a clear responsibility. Norwegian authorities should follow international law, saying that they have an obligation to rectify the situation.

The deputy leader of The Liberal Party of Norway Helge Solum Larsen to ukemagasinet Ny Tid ( English translation)
Deportations to Iran should not happen at all, knowing the current situation in that country. I have no confidence in the government's policy on this subject.

Synne Skouen in Aftenposten
Where are you, Minister of Justice Knut Storberget? We want you to throw around and do what Norwegian authorities according to attorney Schjatvet is er committed to through international law, that is «to rectify the situation».
Now you must, quickly as hell, find out what that could be.

== Reaction from the Immigration authorities ==
The immigration authorities have following the deportation of Rostami argued in the media that their decision was correct, based on the information they hold. UNE-director Terje Sjeggestad also claimed in an interview with weekly magazine Ny Tid that UNE is a human rights organization, to which the "regular" human rights organizations responded negatively in unison.

After Secretary of State Pål Lønseth of the Department of Justice told Ny Tid that UNE had been asked for a statement on the Rostami case, UNE published in their web page 19. April 2011 the statement "Claims without coverage", where they refuted all critical remarks made through the media in relation to the deportation of Rostami. They write: "The circumstances of the case, as they have been portrayed in the media, are significantly different from what UNE decisions are based on."

Two days later, 21. April 2011, Foreign Minister Jonas Gahr Støre published the press release "Increase in brutal public executions in Iran" where he puts forward: "One of the world society's most important sources of information on executions [in Iran] is therefore Iranian human rights organizations and -defenders. These groups and individuals are on a daily basis subject of threats, harassment and imprisonment. "

An article later published on the internet discussion forum NyeMeninger.no criticized the UNE statement of 19. April, and claimed that UNEs claims could be refuted on all points. The writer ended the article with: "Sorry, UNE - the only irrefutable in your declaration is the title, as this was truly a collection of claims without coverage."

== Intervention from United Nations High Commissioner for Refugees ==
Following the media coverage of the Rostami case, the UNHCR office in Geneva sent a request to UNE 4. April 2011 requesting a complete copy of the file, with reference to their role as surveillance authority according to article 35 of the Refugee convention of 1951 and the annexed protocol of 1967, and the Norwegian Immigration Act §98.

== Landinfo - the information source of the Norwegian foreign authorities ==
In the wake of Rahim Rostamis forced deportation and imprisonment in Iran questions and criticism have been raised around the use of information from the Norwegian Country of Origin Information Centre - Landinfo. Until 19. April 2011 the latest updated official information on Iran from Landinfo was dated as far back as to 2007, and thus contained no information on the severely deteriorating conditions in Iran after the Iranian presidential election in 2009, the Green Revolution and the intensification from the clerical regime of actions against the opposition.

This missing updating has been subject of criticism at previous occasions from lawyers, The Iranian Refugee Council in Norway, Norwegian NGOs and the Norwegian Church.

On 19 April 2011 Landinfo published a report documenting the increased threat for turned-down asylum seekers returning to Iran. Much of the information in this report was based on material already published on UNHCR web pages, and the Rahim Rostami case was mentioned in the report.

General country information on Iran was in May 2011 removed from the web pages of Landinfo, and replaced by a link to the Swedish information web portal, explained by lack of resources for giving a satisfactory continuous updating on the situation.

This substantiates the fact that the information upon which the deportation decision for Rahim Rostami was taken, was based on outdated information in the situation in Iran.
