= Nima Doroudi =

Iranian footballer

Personal information
- Date of birth: 9 January 1997 (age 29)
- Place of birth: Sanandaj, Iran
- Height: 1.90 m (6 ft 3 in)
- Position: Forward

Team information
- Current team: Iranjavan
- Number: 99

Youth career
- –2018: Tractor

Senior career*
Years	Team	Apps	(Gls)
2018–2022	Aluminium Arak	36	(2)
2022–2023	Shahrdari Astara	15	(2)
2023–2024	Shahin Bandar Ameri	22	(4)
2024–	Iranjavan	3	(1)
- * Club domestic league appearances and goals as of 29 October 2024

Nima Doroudi (Persian: نیما درودی; born 9 January 1997) is an Iranian football forward who plays for Iranjavan.
