= Assad Sheikholeslami Sanandaji =

Iranian academic and theologian

Dr. Assad Sheikholeslami (Persian: اسعد شیخ الاسلامی) (born in Sanandaj, Kurdistan Province, Iran) is a prominent theologian and professor at Tehran University.

== Biography ==
Dr. Sheikholeslami was an advisor to President Mohammad Khatami during his eight years of presidency with a focus on the issues related to the Sunni population of Iran. He was also a chairman at Tehran University.

He is a Sunni Kurd. Dr. Sheikholeslami is the author of two books on Kalam and continues to teach and advise graduate students at Tehran University. He is also a member of the advisory board for all universities in the western region of Iran.
