= Abdullah Pasha Bajalan =

Kurdish hereditary governor

Abdullah Pasha Bajalan was the third Kurdish hereditary governor of the Pashlik of Zohab and chief of the Bajalan tribe during the mid-1700s.

In the spring of 1754, he fought against Karim Khan Zand when the latter occupied the Kermanshah region. In late 1775, Nazar Ali Khan Zand, who had been dispatched by Karim Khan to reestablish Zand hegemony over Kurdistan, defeated Abdullah near Khanaqin, slaughtering 2,000 of his men and seizing 120,000 head of livestock.

Abdullah built a guard station in Kalai Selzi.

Claudius James Rich notes that near the tomb Hafez in Shiraz lies buried Abdullah Pasha of Zohab who died whilst on a mission to Kerim Khan.
