= Ahmad Bag Komasi =

Kurdish poet (1877–1796)

Ahmad Bag Komasi (1796–1877, Kurdish: ئەحمەد بەگی کۆماسی) was a Kurdish poet and a disciple of Yusuf Yaska. Komasi wrote in Gorani and is best known for an elegy he wrote for his deceased wife which became popular around Kurdistan.

== Life and elegy ==
Ahmad Bag Komasi was from the Komasi tribe who lived near Sanandaj in Ardalan. The verses of his elegy consisted of two rhyming hemistiches, each of ten syllables divided by the caesura into two groups of five syllables. The verses had no consideration for length. The elegy begins with Komasi restoring the tomb of his wife and venting his sorrow. He is anxious over his beloved lying in darkness and cold, and remembers her hair and eyes. The elegy contains some typical Islamic characterizations including the name of his wife Leyla, calling his wife "a walking cypress", and the idea of a fire of separation between the two. In regards to Gorani literature, he took a liberal stance on its frameworks.

== Elegy ==
A portion of the elegy dedicated to his wife:

The fresh mound of Leyla!

Today I went near the fresh mound of Leyla.
At the foot of the tomb of the graceful Leyla,
Like a torrent, tears showered from my eyes.
I repaired to her bedside and with my heart surging
Seized with my hands her tumular stone.
I said: o thou who settest the heart on fire, lo, before you is the Qays clad in rags

Blessed by thy house in the dreary waste !

— Minorsky, p 101.
