= Ali Beg Zanganeh =

Kurdish nobleman in Safavid Empire

Mirza Ali Beg Zanganeh was a Kurdish nobleman from the Zanganeh tribe, who served in various offices under the Safavids. During the reign of Abbas I (r. 1571–1629), Ali Beg occupied the “holder of the rein” office (jelawdar). In 1618, he was promoted to the office of master of the king's stables (amirakhor-bashi), and under Shah Safi (r. 1611–1642), Ali Beg became a member of the royal guard (qurchi). Ali Beg had three sons, Shaykh Ali Khan, Najaf Qoli Beg and Shahrokh Sultan, all of whom served under high-offices.

== Sources ==
- Matthee, Rudi. "ŠAYḴ-ʿALI KHAN ZANGANA". Encyclopaedia Iranica.
