= Hiwa Pashaei =

Kurdish artist (born 1979)

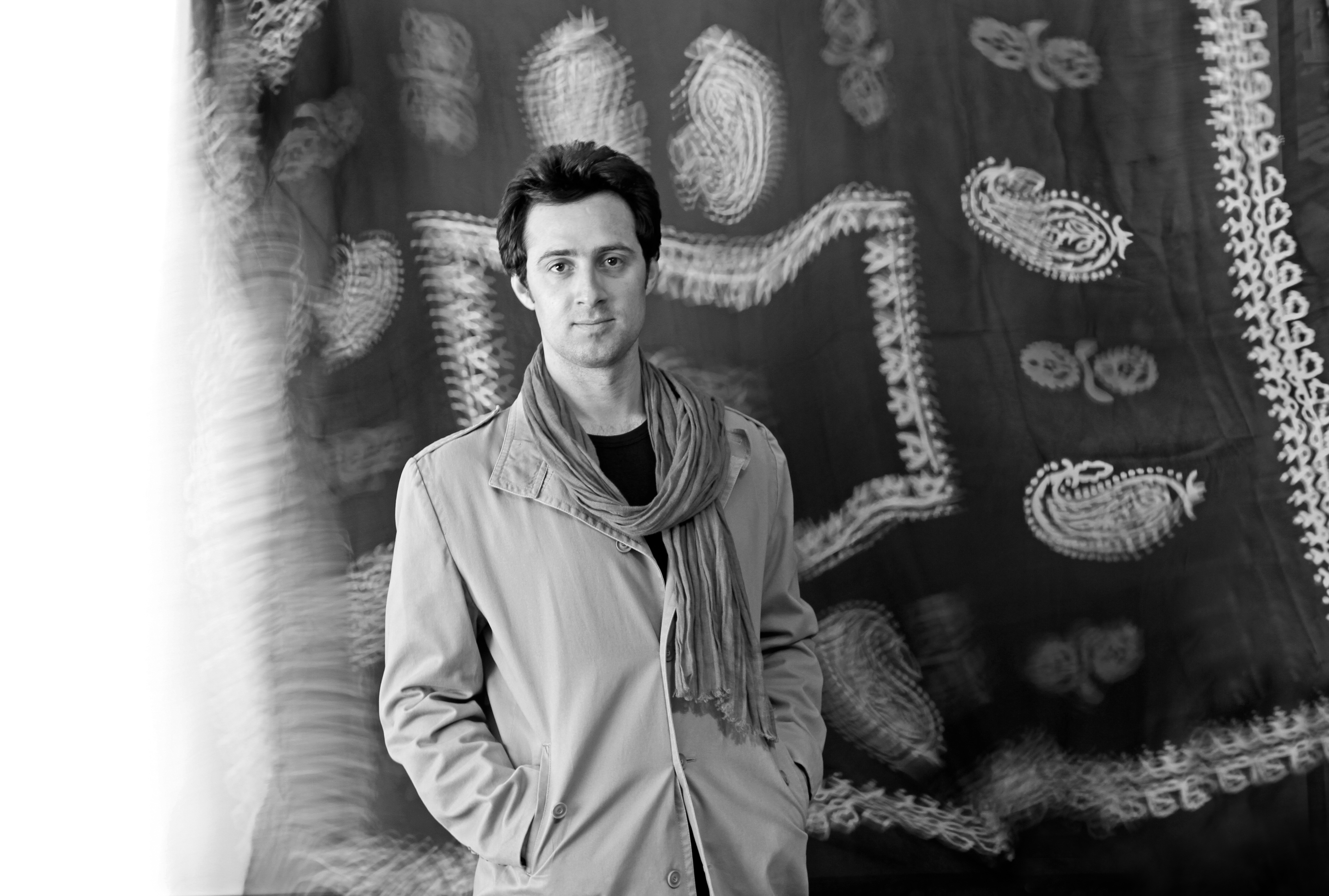
- Born: August 1979 (age 46); Eslamabad-e Gharb, Kermanshah Province, Iranian Kurdistan
- Education: Islamic Azad University, Central Tehran Branch, Soore University
- Website: hiwapashaei.com

Hiwa Pashaei or Hiva Pashaei (Persian: هیوا پاشایی; Kurdish: هیوا پاشایی, August 1979, Eslamabad-e Gharb – ) is a Kurdish painter, photographer, calligrapher, graphist, curator and publisher from Iran, living in the United States. He is active in the fields of painting, graphic design, research and education of visual arts. Pashaei is known for his spearhead role in pixel art in Iran and Kurdistan. Pashaei is also renowned because of his innovative use of Kurdish culture themes, specially culture of Kermanshah region Kurds, creating figurative works with the subject of Kurdish women, and presenting these themes in the form of modern and post modern art. He is manager of Rouge Art Gallery and Founder of Jowan Visual Art School in Tehran, and also CEO & Founder of Art & Culture Center of California "ACCC" in Los Angeles. Pashaei has held several individual and group exhibitions in Iran and other countries like Iraq, Japan, Italy, France and United States.

== Early life ==
Hiwa Pashaei was born in August 1979, in Eslamabad-e Gharb, Kermanshah Province of Iranian Kurdistan. He graduated in graphic design in 1997 from Culture and Islamic Guidance Administration's Vocational School for Visual arts. Then he continued his education in Martyr Mofatteh Technical and Vocational University of Hamedan and graduated as associate of arts (A.A) in 2000.

Pashaei went to Tehran and studied graphic design in Soore University and received bachelor of fine arts (B.F.A) degree from there in 2003. He continued his education in Islamic Azad University, Central Tehran Branch and defended his thesis Designing Logos in Iran: Desining Logo for Iranian Institutions under the supervision of Bahram Kalhornia and advisory of Manouchehr Rakhshan in 2006.

Hiwa Pashaei was interested in Middle-Eastern peoples' cultural semiology and did some researches on this field specially on Kurdish people. He went to France on behalf of Tehran Museum of Contemporary Art to workout and research on painting and graphic design, and subsequently be the resident of Cité internationale des arts in Paris in 2012.

Hiwa Pashaei established the Honarjoo arts news website in 2009 and started working in his personal art studio from that time. He also founded the Jouan School of Visual Arts in that year. Moreover he was the art director of Takhte Jamshid Cultural and Art Foundation from 2005, and a member of Ministry of Culture and Islamic Guidance Center for Expansion of Visual Arts from 2008. Pashaei also founded the Rouge Art Gallery in Tehran in 2009, and Art & Culture Center of California (ACCC) in Los Angeles, United States in 2018.

Hiwa Pashaei is a member of Iranian Graphic Designers Society (IGDS) from 2008 and Iranian Inventors Association from 2010.

== Career ==
Hiwa Pashaei has been active in the field of designing logo, poster, environmental graphic design, page layout and also social documentary and commercial photography. Regardless of teaching visual arts, he has held numerous workshops. One of his prominent works consists of a designing a logo and a poster for International Festival of Kurdish Dance and Music in Iraqi Kurdistan.

Pashaei established the Chero Publication in 2011 and began to work in publishing.

He was the first Iranian artist which created artworks in the form of Pixel art and Textile art. He also has created many artworks in the manner of mixed media, installation art, conceptual art and digital art. Moreover he has held several workshops in Niavaran Cultural Center, Ariana Art Gallery and Museum of the Qasr Prison and has taught these techniques to at least 300 students.

Hiwa Pashaei has adapted Nastaliq technique of Iranian calligraphy with Kurdish alphabets which was expanded by Mirza Mohammad Reza Kalhor in Qajar period to use in modern printing. He has created some calligraphy and calligram artworks in this manner in Kurdish language.

Hiwa Pashaei has created many artworks with subject of Kurdish women and men of Kalhor tribe and specifically presented them in "Henase", "Daye" and "Bawan" individual exhibitions. He has collected photos and albums of Kurdish families for many years, and has researched them to present patterns of figurative forms which indicates Kurdish people personality. He could obtained a modern expression of pictorial identity of Kurdish people of Kermanshah region, with putting the personalities up in a mixture of traditional motifs and appearances of modern life, with preserving the historical and ethnological roots of them at the same time. Pashaei is perhaps the first Kurdish artist that represented Kurdish people and specially Kurdish women with a perceptual and research approach. Pashaei noticed that the transformation of Kurdish men clothes in Kermanshah region was very precedent rather than the Kurdish women, and actually the Kurdish women of Kermanshah region has resisted against cultural assimilation and transformation of Kurdish clothes for many years with preserving their costume. Pashaei has been tried to present a prestigious image of Kurdish people of Kermanshah region generally.

Opening ceremony of "Bawan" exhibition held in May 2015 in Museum of the Qasr Prison, accompanied by performing Kurdish music by Shakhwashin ensemble, Kurdish dance by Aso Naderi, and also screening a documentary by Majid Azadi.

It is very to say that one of Hiwa Pashaei's artworks was shown in art department gallery of Michigan State University.

== Teaching ==
Hiwa Pashaei has taught as Visiting scholar in universities such as Soore, Islamic Azad University, Applied Science and Technology in Tehran and Kish.

He has held several painting, drawing and calligram workshops in Islamic Azad University, Kish branch of Applied Science and Technology University and Ideh Institute from 2008. He has taught in group workshop of designing logo and inscription in University of Science and Culture and Islamic Azad University, Parand Branch as a visiting professor in 2009. He was the director of graffiti part of the first Fajr International Visual Arts Festival in Tehran Museum of Contemporary Art and held workshop of graffiti and at the same time was a visiting scholar in painting part of that festival.

Pashaei was member of the jury and one of the directors of the second Fajr International Visual Arts Festival in Museum of Contemporary Art of Ahvaz in 2009. He was jury president and director of Cultural Social Festival of Art Graduates of Iranian Universities in Museum of the Qasr Prison in Tehran in 2015. Moreover Pashaei was jury president and director of Drawing and Calligraphy Festival of Art Graduates of Iranian Universities, and also member of jury and director of the First Azadegan Visual Arts Festival, both held in the Museum of the Qasr Prison in 2015.

Hiwa Pashaei was participated as director, instructor and curator of Portrait painting of Iranian Musicians Exhibition in 2016 which held in Niavaran Cultural Center with attendance of prominent figures of Iranian traditional music. 14 artists participated in that event created portraits of 15 celebrated musicians using metal spring and 2.5 cm ribbons, in a manner inspired by carpet weaving. In this group exhibition musicians such as Shahram Nazeri, Keivan Saket and Shahrdad Rouhani were attended and Majid Derakhshani and Arsalan Kamkar debuted from their portraits together with the creator artists, and also Hana Kamkar debuted from Bijan Kamkar portrait.

Pashaei was director, instructor and juror of 100 Celebrities of Iranian Cinema and Theatre Exhibition which held in Ariana Art Gallery in 2017 with participation of 100 painter artists and attendance of prominent figures of Iranian cinema and theatre. Moreover he was director, instructor, curator and jury president in 100 Iranian Athletic Stars Exhibition which held in Museum of Fine Arts in Sa'dabad Complex in 2018 with participation of 100 painter artists and attendance of Minister of Sport and Youth, President of the International Olympic Committee on Iran and prominent Iranian athletic figures. This exhibition was enthusiastically received by some prominent visitors such as Shahram Nazeri and Sadegh Zibakalam.

Pashaei has held a master class of Fine Arts in Tehran and Los Angeles in 2018.

== Press career ==
Hiwa Pashaei has liaised with journals such as Tandis biweekly, Hamshahri, Iran, Ebtekar, Jam-e Jam and other newspapers, and news agencies such as Art of Iran, Mehr, IRNA, ISNA and also, television channels such as IRIB TV1, IRIB TV4 and IRIB Amoozesh regarding to visual arts.

== Books ==
- Pashaei, Hiwa. 150 Young Iranian Designers (English-Persian), author and art director Hiwa Pashaei, Translator Sepideh Khalili, Tehran: Talaee Publishing, First Edition, 2009.
- Pashaei, Hiwa. The young Iranian designers (English-Persian), Compiling, Layout and Art Director Hiwa Pashaei, Tehran, 2010.
- Pashaei, Hiwa. Manuscript? Calligraphy? Calligram or Typographic Poster? (Persian), in Tandis biweekly, Number 63, 2005, Pp 12–13.
- Pashaei, Hiwa. Mural Paintings of California, Tehran: Ideh, 2018.
- Pashaei, Hiwa. Pixel art and It's Manipulation, Tehran, Ideh. 2018.

== Exhibition ==
- Poster and Photography Exhibition, Visual Arts Exhibition Center of Culture and Islamic Guidance Administration, 1998, 1999, 2000.
- Noma Illustration Group Exhibition in Japan, Institute for the Intellectual Development of Children and Young Adults, 2002.
- Visual Arts Group Exhibition, Niavaran Cultural Center, 2003.
- Exhibition of The First International Biennial of Islamic World Poster, Academy of Arts of the Islamic Republic of Iran, 2004.
- Exhibition of 5th Generation of Iranian Graphic Designers, Academy of Arts of the Islamic Republic of Iran, 2006.
- Exhibition of The Second International Biennial of Islamic World Poster, Academy of Arts of the Islamic Republic of Iran, 2007.
- First Exhibition of Kurdish Photography, Nikol Faridani Gallery, 2007.
- Spectacle of Soore Exhibition, Soore Gallery, 2007.
- "National Day of Altruism, Resistance and Victory" Poster Exhibition, Imam Ali Religious Arts Museum, 2008.
- Painting Exhibition of The First Fajr International Visual Arts Festival, Tehran Museum of Contemporary Art, 2008.
- Exhibition of The First Azadegan Visual Arts Festival, Academy of Arts of the Islamic Republic of Iran, 2010.
- Silver Cypress Exhibition, Special for members of Iranian Graphic Designers Society (IGDS), Iranian Artists Forum, 2010.
- Individual Exhibition of Mixed Media and Painting, Cité des arts Gallery of Paris and Iranian Cultural Center of Paris, 2011.
- "Henase" Exhibition, Mixed Media with subject of Kurdish culture, Middle East Gallery of Tehran, 2012.
- "Paint-ography" Individual Exhibition, Middle East Gallery of Tehran, 2012.
- "Paint-ography" Individual Exhibition, Cité internationale des arts, Paris, 2012.
- Participating in The First Exhibition of World Galleries in Iran, Tehran, Museum of the Qasr Prison, 2014.
- "Bawan" Individual Painting Exhibition, Tehran, Museum of the Qasr Prison, 2015.
- "Hawbeş" Individual Exhibition, Sanandaj Municipality Gallery, 2016.
- "Daye" Individual Exhibition, Kermanshah, Kalhor Gallery, 2016.
- Group Exhibition of Artworks, Art Department Gallery of Michigan State University, 2016.
- Portrait painting of Iranian Musicians Exhibition, Tehran, Niavaran Cultural Center, 2016.
- Group Exhibition of Painting, VEFA Art Gallery, Los Angeles, California, 2018.
- 100 Celebrities of Iranian Cinema and Theatre Exhibition, Tehran, Ariana Art Gallery, 2017.
- 100 Iranian Athletic Stars Exhibition, Museum of Fine Arts in Sa'dabad Complex, 2018.

== Awards ==
- Third rate of photography part of the Nationwide Students Festival for Culture and art, 1999.
- First rate in graphic part of the 4th Culture and Islamic Guidance Ministry Festival of Visual Arts, 2003.
- Third rate of Basmala Designing Symposium, Islamic Development Organization, 2003.
- Selected artist of The Second International Festival of Resistance Art, 2010.
- Resident in "Cité international Des Art, Paris, 2012.
- Selected artist of Tokyo designer's week, 2014.
- Participate in Venice biennial, 2015.
- Granted Residency in the USA Based on "Artistic Extraordinary Ability" category, 2016.
