= Ardeshir Pashang =

Kurdish-Iranian Journalist and researcher

Ardeshir Pashang اردشیر پشنگ
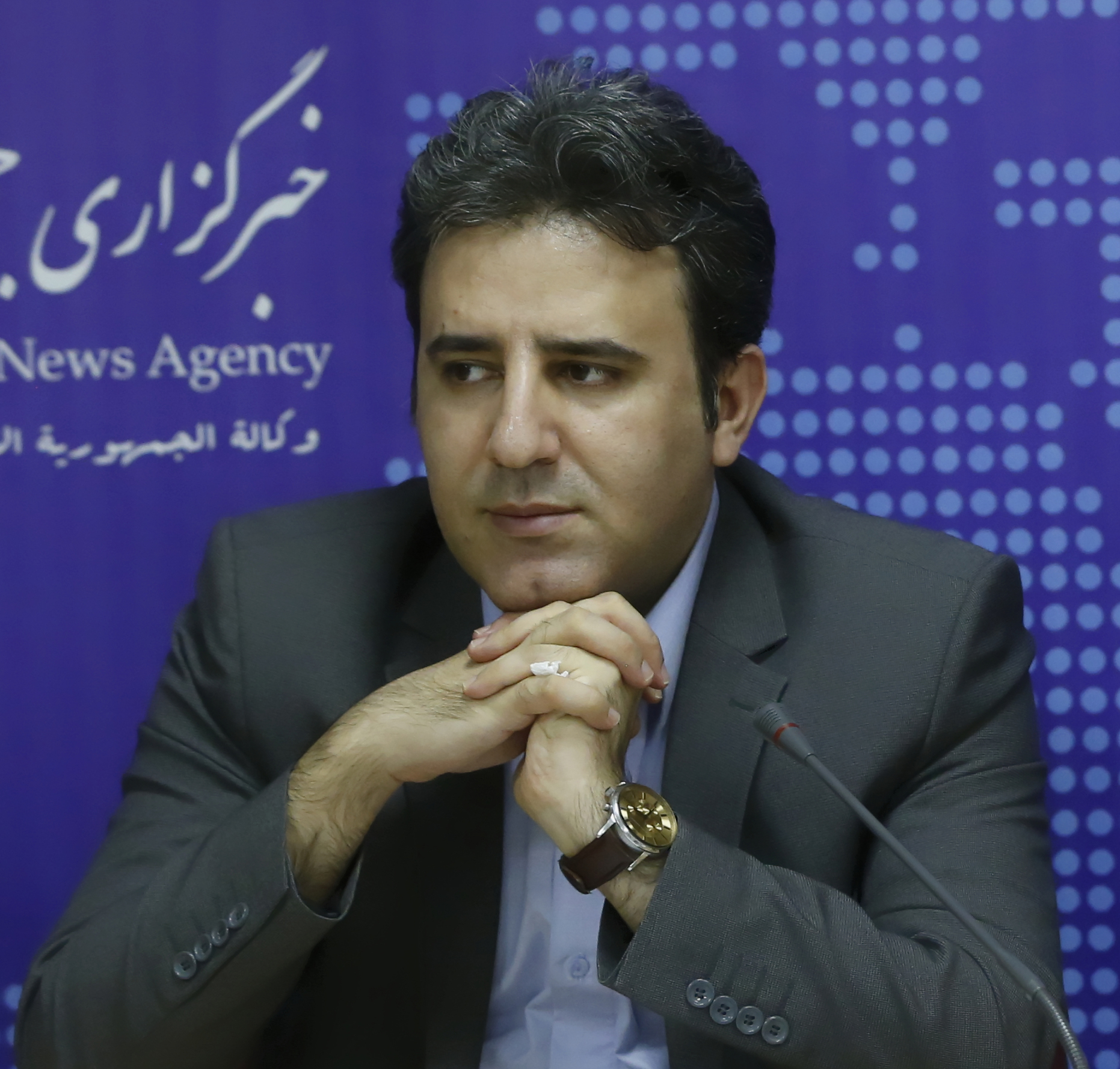
- Ardeshir Pashang in 2017
- Born: December 22, 1979 (age 46); Kermanshah, Iran
- Education: Ph.D
- Alma mater: Razi University; University of Tehran; Islamic Azad University
- Occupations: Researcher, Politician, Journalist
- Years active: 2001–present
- Title: Dr.

Ardeshir Pashang (Persian: اردشیر پشنگ, born December 22, 1979) is a Kurdish-Iranian Politician, Journalist and researcher of Middle Eastern affairs, focusing on Kurdish studies and Iranian issues. He incorporates a critical perspective in his analyses, addressing themes such as human rights, democracy, and political interactions in the region.

Pashang holds a bachelor's degree in political science and master’s and doctoral degrees in international relations. He began his professional career in journalism in the early 2000s and has since contributed to media and educational initiatives in Iran. He advocates for peace, human rights-based democracy, and constructive dialogue among civil societies of various countries. Through his work, Pashang emphasizes reducing unproductive ideological and extremist nationalist tensions, aiming to foster regional cooperation.

== Early life and education ==
Ardeshir Pashang was born on December 22, 1979, in Kermanshah, Iran, to a middle-class Kurdish family with a strong Iranian and Kurdish cultural heritage. He completed his primary, middle, and high school education in Kermanshah. In 2001, he fulfilled his mandatory military service in the Iranian Air Force, stationed in Tehran. In 2003, he was admitted to the Political Science program at Razi University in Kermanshah, where he successfully earned his bachelor’s degree over the course of six academic terms. Continuing his academic journey, Pashang began his master’s studies in International Relations at the University of Tehran in 2008, graduating in 2011.

During the 2009 Iranian presidential election, Pashang’s involvement in political and student activism led to his arrest. He was detained for two weeks and transferred to Section 209 of Evin Prison, a facility known for holding political prisoners. In 2012, his admission to the doctoral program in International Relations at the University of Tehran was unlawfully revoked, prompting him to pursue his Ph.D. at the Islamic Azad University, Science and Research Branch, in Tehran. However, his admission process at this institution was fraught with difficulties, as his name was inexplicably absent from both the accepted and rejected candidates’ lists for over three months. Throughout his doctoral studies, Pashang faced significant challenges, including prolonged delays in the approval of his dissertation proposal and defense, attributed to pressures from certain university authorities and faculty members. Despite these obstacles, he successfully defended his doctoral dissertation in 2023.

Family

The Pashang family, a prominent Kurdish-speaking lineage with a distinguished history of political and social activism in Iran and Kurdistan, has played a significant role in the region’s contemporary history. The family was actively involved in pivotal events, including the constitutional struggles of 1912, resistance against Reza Shah in 1931, support for Mohammad Mosaddegh’s government in 1953, and backing for Mullah Mustafa Barzani’s movement against the Ba’athist regime in Iraq from 1960 to 1975. In 1931, two prominent figures of the family, "Agha Enayat Javanroodi" and "Mohammad Rashid Beig", both grandfathers of Ardeshir Pashang, were arrested on Reza Shah’s orders and imprisoned for a decade in the Qasr-e Qajar prison in Tehran and later in Isfahan. Agha Enayat Javanroodi later documented his tumultuous experiences and those of his companions in a book written in both Kurdish and Persian, which stands as a valuable historical record of the family’s resistance against the injustices of the Pahlavi regime. Furthermore, "Jahan Ara Khanom," the sister of Agha Enayat Javanroodi, alongside her brother, is recognized as one of the prominent and pioneering poets and literary figures in the southern Kurdistan region.

== Career ==
Ardeshir Pashang began his journalism career at a young age with the Iranian Students News Agency (ISNA). He later contributed to various Iranian media outlets, including Iran newspaper, Shargh, Taadol, Khabaronline, and IRNA. His work also appeared on international platforms such as Yahoo, Efe, La Vanguardia, Heraldo de Aragón, ABC, Universo Online, infobae, La República, Sputnik, Deutsche Welle, SWI swissinfo, VOA (Kurdish section), Atalayar, Nueva Prensa de Guayana, United World and Peace Mark (human rights activists in Iran).

Pashang holds a PhD in International Relations and is a senior researcher specializing in Middle East affairs and Kurdish studies. Currently, he serves as the Chief Editor of Faratab News Agency and works as a freelance journalist based in Tehran, focusing on regional political analysis and commentary. He also leads educational initiatives, including journalism and writing workshops, and is actively involved in academic discussions on Middle Eastern geopolitics, as evidenced by his recent participation in conferences such as the 'Middle East in the Midst of War and Peace' at the University of Kurdistan in 2025. Additionally, he delivered a speech at the Erbil Forum 2025 alongside prominent figures such as Nechirvan Barzani and Ahmad Naqibzadeh, Deputy Speaker of the Turkish Parliament, discussing the future of the Middle East."

== Media appearances ==
Over the past 15 years, Ardeshir Pashang has served as an expert on Middle Eastern affairs, Iran, and Kurdish issues, participating in various programs on international and regional television and radio networks. Notable among these media outlets are Al Jazeera, Rudaw, Kurdistan 24, Kurdistan TV, IRINN, Sahar Kurdi, Sahar Bosnia, Kurdsat, Zagros TV, Russia Today, Radio Iran, Radio Goftogoo, Gali Kurdistan, Eco Iran and Press TV.

Pashang has also appeared in the documentary Sarpatiha (2022). This documentary focuses on the role of Yarmohammad Khan Kermanshahi and other key figures, such as Abdolkarim Beyg, Vakil of Javanrud, in the Constitutional Revolution in Kermanshah. Pashang contributes as an expert, providing historical and analytical insights into the events, drawing on his expertise in Kurdish and Middle Eastern studies to contextualize the revolution’s significance in the region’s political history.

== Professional activities ==
=== Faratab News Agency ===
In 2014, Ardeshir Pashang founded the Faratab media outlet. This platform, established in collaboration with a group of independent writers and journalists, focuses on producing analytical and critical content. Since its inception, Faratab has published over 13,000 reports, opinion pieces, articles, and interviews. Additionally, more than 560 independent contributors have published their work exclusively on the platform.

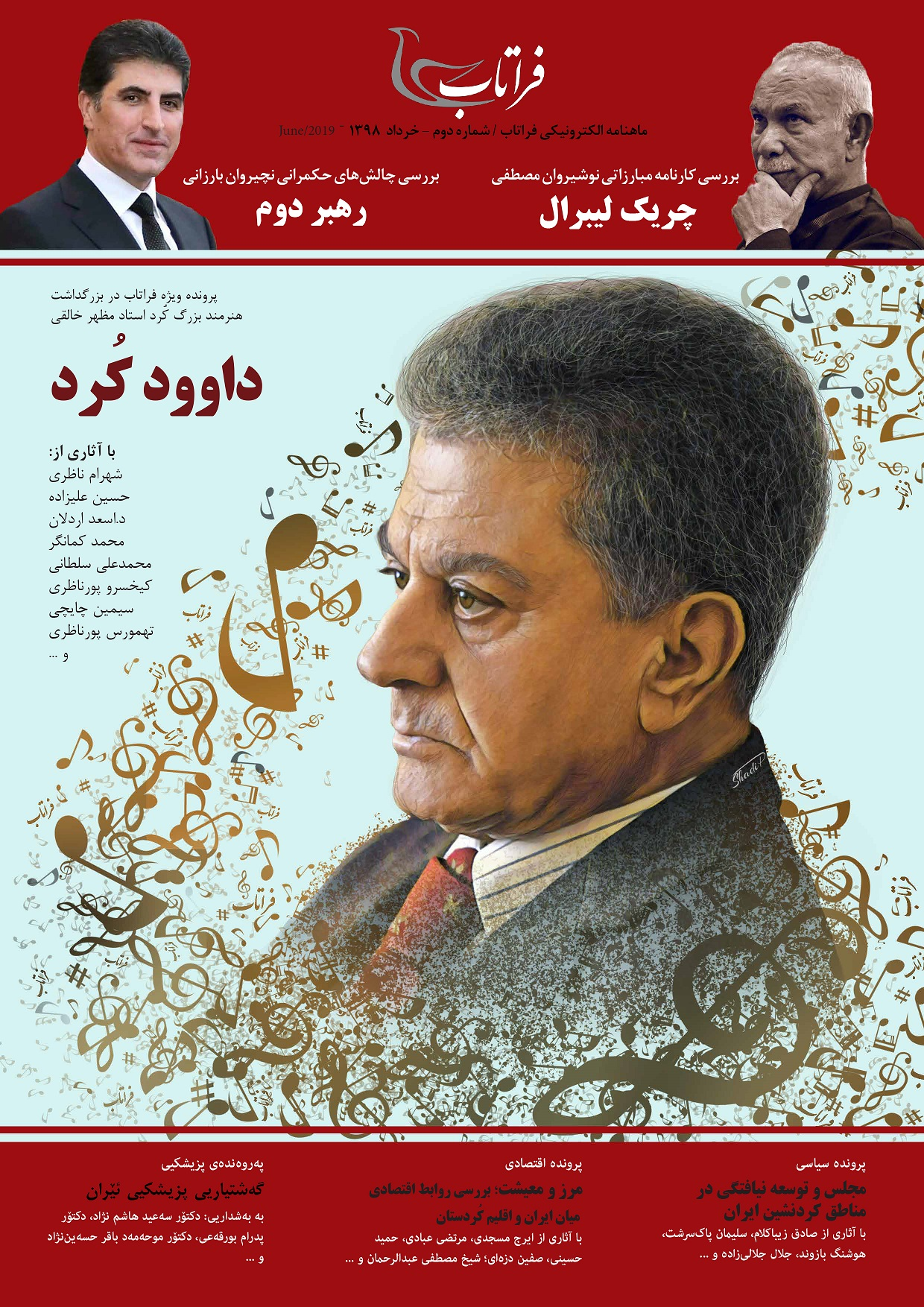
Faratab Magazine, featuring Mazhar Khaleqi

=== Faratabs's Monthly Magazine ===
In 2019, Pashang published the first printed edition of Faratab, titled "Faratab Monthly," with a picture of Kurdish singer "Mazhar Khaleghi" on the first cover. Abbas Vali, Sadegh Zibakalam, Ghadir Nasri, Majid Saleh, and Nader Entesar were among the analysts of the first issue.

=== Journalism classes ===
Beyond its media operations, Faratab has been active in journalism and writing education. It has organized 16 professional training courses in journalism, writing, and branding, each comprising beginner, intermediate, and advanced levels. A total of 278 individuals has graduated from these programs, many of whom are now employed at prominent television, radio, and news agencies in Persian, Kurdish, and English languages. Ardeshir Pashang has been responsible for designing and teaching these courses.

Faratab has also collaborated with reputable educational and professional institutions, conducting joint programs with entities such as the University of Tehran, Kharazmi University, Tarbiat Modares University, Allameh Tabataba’i University, Razi University in Kermanshah, University of Zanjan, the Iran Chamber of Commerce, Hoor Institute, Rudaw Media, Soran University in the Kurdistan Region, the Center for Strategic Studies of the Middle East, the Iranian Association for West Asian Studies, and Saless Publishing.

== Bibliography ==
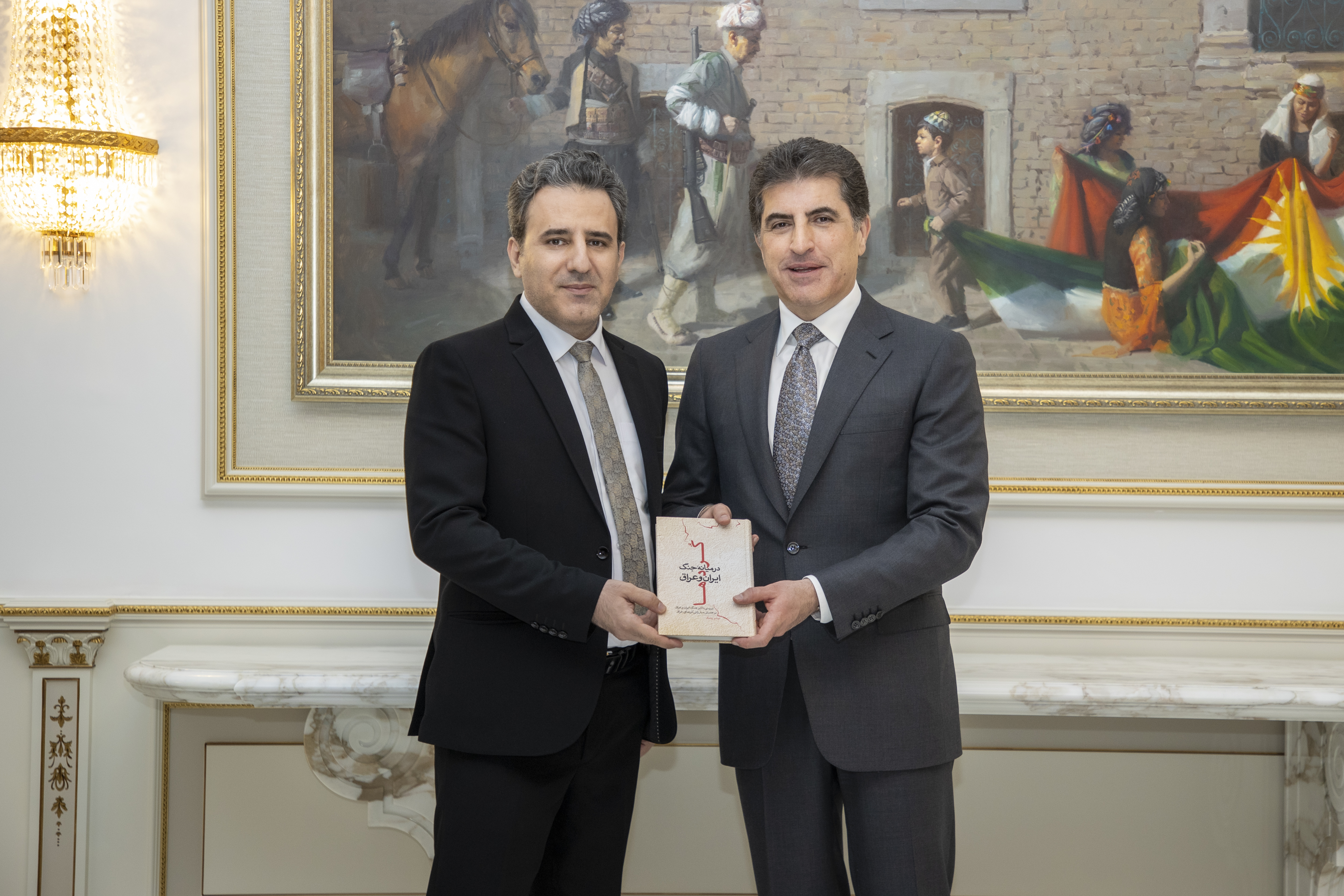
Meeting and conversation between Ardeshir Pashang and President Nechirvan Barzani, leader of the Kurdistan Region of Iraq, and the presentation of the book Kurds in the Midst of the Iran-Iraq War by Pashang to him.

- *Kurds in the Midst of the Iran-Iraq War*, Ardeshir Pashang, Tehran: Marz-o-Bum Publications, January 2016.
- *Turkey: Past, Present, and Future*, Asadollah Athari, Ardeshir Pashang, et al. (collection of articles), Tehran: Center for Scientific Research and Middle East Strategic Studies, May 2015.
- *Encyclopedia of Contemporary Iraqi Figures and Families*, Sadegh Kharrazi, Ardeshir Pashang, et al., Tehran: Azam Publications, June 2013.
- *Middle East, Central Asia, and Caucasus 2012*, Seyed Salman Safavi, Ardeshir Pashang, et al. (collection of articles from the International Peace Studies Center), ed. Seyed Salman Safavi et al., September 2013.
- *Middle East, Central Asia, and Caucasus 2011*, Seyed Salman Safavi, Ardeshir Pashang, et al. (collection of articles from the International Peace Studies Center), Qom: Salman and Azadeh Publications, September 2012.
- *Encyclopedia of Contemporary Iraqi Figures*, Sadegh Kharrazi, Ardeshir Pashang, et al., Tehran: Islamic Consultative Assembly Publishing Center, May 2011.
- *Diplomacy: One Platform, Multiple Dreams: Persian Gulf 2010*, Seyed Salman Safavi, Ardeshir Pashang, et al. (collection of articles from the International Peace Studies Center), Qom: Salman and Azadeh Publications, December 2011.
- *Political Middle East and Caucasus 2010*, Seyed Salman Safavi, Ardeshir Pashang, et al. (collection of articles from the International Peace Studies Center), Qom: Salman and Azadeh Publications, April 2011.
- *Kermanshan*, Ardeshir Pashang (editor), Erbil (Iraq): Aras Publications, June 2009.
- *From Kermanshan to Barzan*, Ardeshir Pashang (editor), Erbil (Iraq): Aras Publications, May 2007.

== Selected publications ==
- Pashang, Ardeshir; Barzegar, Kayhan; Naqibzadeh, Ahmad (2024). "The Impact of International and Regional Events and Trends on the Rise of Kurdish Activism and Aspirations in Iraq (1991–2017)". Geopolitics Quarterly (in Persian). 19 (4).
- Pashang, Ardeshir; Barzegar, Kayhan; Naqibzadeh, Ahmad; Qavam, Seyed Abdulali (2024). "Challenges of Economic Development in the Kurdistan Region of Iraq in the Middle East". International Political Economy Studies (in Persian). 6 (2).
- Pashang, Ardeshir; Barzegar, Kayhan (2019). "Kurds' Activism and Middle East Regional Security Complex" (PDF). Hemispheres (34): 5–20.
- Pashang, Ardeshir (2019). "Saudi Arabia's Entry into Iraq with an Economic Card". Tehran Chamber of Commerce Magazine (in Persian): 56.
- Pashang, Ardeshir; Shirkhani, Mohammad Ali; Karami, Kamran (2019). "The Islamic Republic of Iran and Power Balancing During the Iran–Iraq War: A Case Study of Iran's Alliance with Iraqi Kurdish Groups". Holy Defense Studies (in Persian). 7 (3).
- Pashang, Ardeshir (2017). "Revisiting Economic Diplomacy". Chaharrah Monthly (in Persian).
- Pashang, Ardeshir (2015). "Political Developments in Iraq in Light of the Foreign Policies of Iran, Turkey, and Saudi Arabia (2003–2014)". Foreign Policy Quarterly (in Persian). 29 (3).
- Pashang, Ardeshir; Bayat, Mohsen (2014). "U.S. Strategy in the Effectiveness of Sanctions and the Necessity of Demonstrating Power". Defense Policy Quarterly (in Persian). 22 (Ascension).
- Pashang, Ardeshir; Gholami, Ali; Mahkouei, Hojjat (2014). "The European Union and GUAM: Engagement or Estrangement?". Central Asia and the Caucasus Studies (in Persian) (80).
- Ghorbani, Arsal; Hariri, Rahman; Pashang, Ardeshir (2013). "Public and Cultural Diplomacy from the Perspective of Cosmopolitan Constructivism" (PDF). International Relations Research (in Persian). 3 (1).
- Pashang, Ardeshir (2013). "Exploring the Roots of Insecurity and Terrorism in Iraq". Taraz Biweekly (in Persian).
- Pashang, Ardeshir; Zomorodi, Zahra (2014). "Political Developments in Iraq in Light of the Foreign Policies of Iran, Turkey, and Saudi Arabia" (PDF). Foreign Policy Quarterly (in Persian).
- Shirkhani, Mohammad Ali; Pashang, Ardeshir; Bahrami, Mohammad (2012). "Public Diplomacy as a Tool for Reconstructing the Tarnished Image of the United States in the Middle East: From September 11, 2001, to Post-Arab Spring". International Relations Research (in Persian). 2 (3).
- Pashang, Ardeshir (2012). "Kurdish Identity from the Perspective of Islamists in Iraqi Kurdistan: A Case Study of the Kurdistan Islamic Union". Strategic Studies of the Islamic World (in Persian) (52): 115 to 142.
- Pashang, Ardeshir (2012). "Analytical Review of Iraq's Events in 2011 and Prospects for 2012". Just Peace Diplomacy Quarterly (in Persian) (6).
- Pashang, Ardeshir (2010). "Political Dimensions and Consequences of the 1975 Algiers Agreement on Iraqi Kurds". Contemporary Islam Encyclopedia (in Persian).
- Pashang, Ardeshir (2010). "Legal Dimensions of the Halabja Chemical Bombing". Contemporary Islam Encyclopedia (in Persian).
- Pashang, Ardeshir (2007). "Sarem al-Sultan, a Historian in Prison". Mahabad Monthly (in Persian). p. 52.

== Filmography ==
Documentary
Year	Title	Director / Production
2007	Agha Enayat	Ehsan Akhavan
2011	Zayeleh	Sahar TV
2017	Hevpeivin	Rudaw Media Network
2019	From Mahabad	Rudaw Media Network
2022	Sarpatiha	Keyvan Mehregan
