= Mohammad Ghazi (translator) =

Iranian translator (1913-1998)

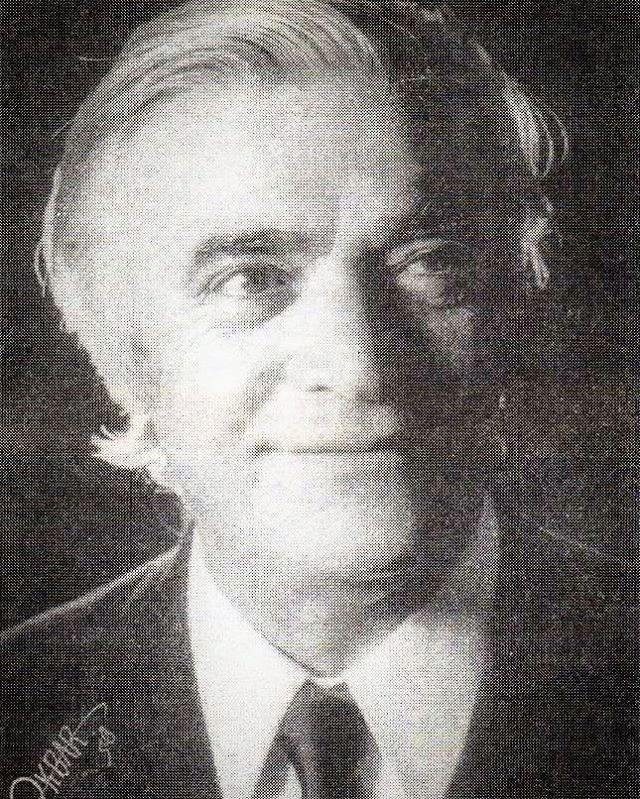
- Born: Mohammad Ghazi; 3 August 1913; Mahabad, Sublime State of Iran
- Died: 14 January 1998 (aged 84); Tehran, Iran
- Occupation: Translator

Mohammad Ghazi (Persian: محمد قاضی, Kurdish: محەممەد قازی; also romanized as Muhammad Qazi; 3 August 1913 in Mahabad, Iran – 14 January 1998 in Tehran) was a prolific, renowned Iranian translator and writer of Kurdish origin who translated numerous books mainly from French into Persian. He wrote/ translated nearly 70 books.

Ghazi studied literature at Dar ul-Funun, Tehran.

In 1953, Ghazi published the Persian translation of Penguin Island. The following year, he translated The Little Prince. Having translated Don Quixote of Cervantes, he received an award for best translation of the year from Tehran University. He has translated more than 60 books including Madame Bovary, The Last Day of a Condemned Man, Captain Michalis, Christ Recrucified, Zorba the Greek and The Decameron.

He died on 14 January 1998, in Day Hospital, Tehran, at the age of 85.
