= Markhoz =

Markhoz مرخز
- Village
- Location within Iran
- Coordinates: 36°16′46″N 46°08′09″E
- Country: Iran
- Province: Kurdistan
- County: Saqqez
- Bakhsh: Central
- Rural District: Sara

Population (2006)
  - Total: 909
- Time zone: UTC+3:30 (IRST)
  - Summer (DST): UTC+4:30 (IRDT)

Markhoz (Persian: مرخز, also Romanized as Markhaz and Morkhoz; also known as Morkhvoz) is a village in Sara Rural District, in the Central District of Saqqez County, Kurdistan Province, Iran. At the 2006 census, its population was 909, in 195 families. The village is populated by Kurds.
