= Qani =

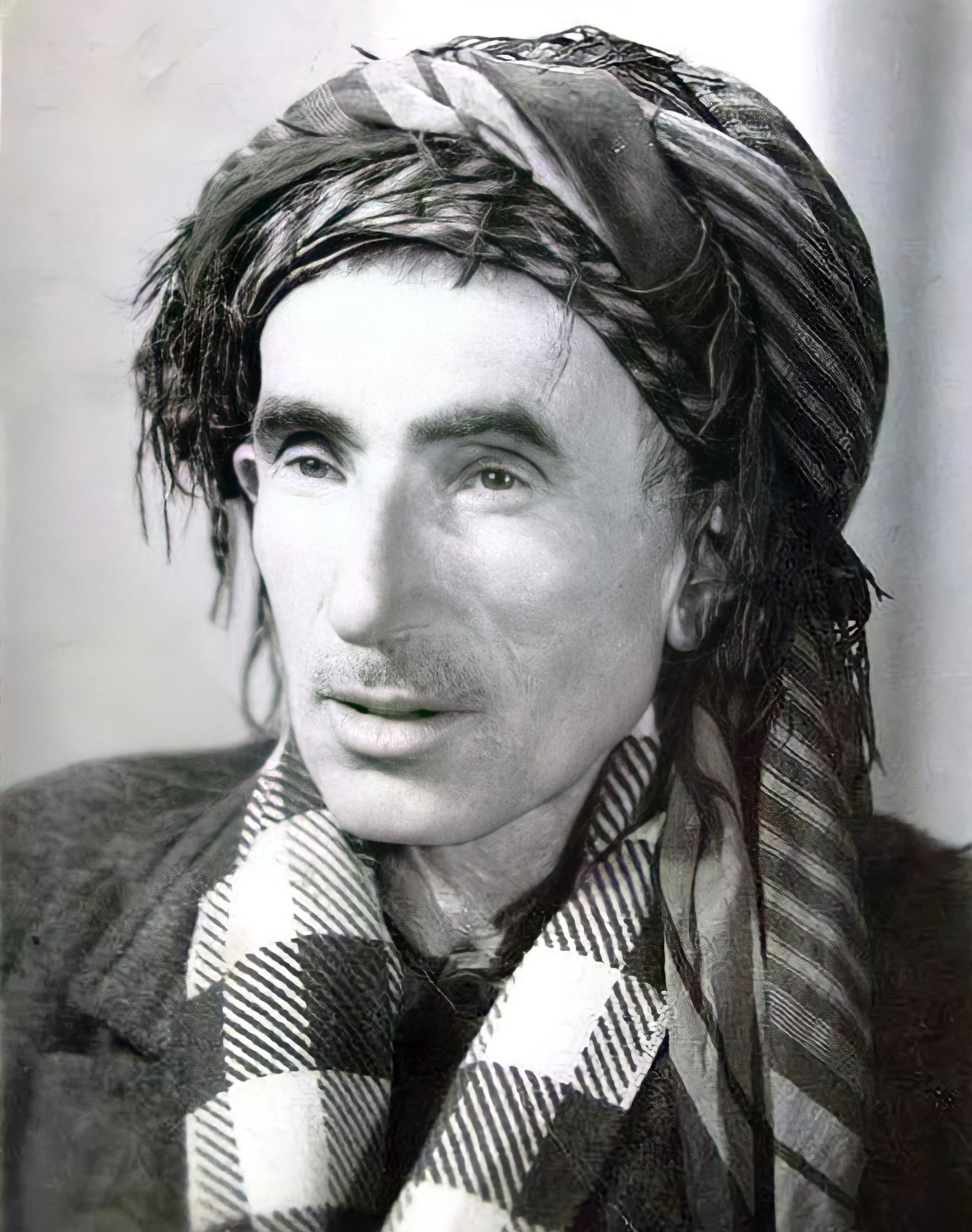
Image of Qani

Qani (1898-1965) was the pen name of Muhammad Kabuli, a prominent Kurdish poet. He was born in the village of Rîshen, around Mariwan, in Iranian Kurdistan. He lost his parents shortly after his birth.

Because he devoted most of his poetry to oppressed people, he is known as the Kurdish Poet of the Oppressed. The main themes of his poetry are freedom, Kurdish struggle, women's rights, nature and love.

== Works ==
- Gulaley Merîwan
- Baxçey Kurdistan
- Çiwarbaxî Pêncwên
- Şaxî Hewraman
- Deştî Germiyan
