= Tishk TV =

- Broadcast area: Europe, North Africa, Middle East
- Affiliates: Democratic Party of Iranian Kurdistan
- Headquarters: Paris, France

Programming
- Languages: Kurdish, Persian, Arabic, Baluchi

History
- Launched: 16 February 2006; 20 years ago
- Replaced by: Kurd Channel

Links
- Website: www.tishktv.tv

Tishk TV (Kurdish: تیشک تی ڤی) was a Kurdish satellite TV channel established in 2006 broadcasting from Europe to Iran and Kurdistan. Tishk TV belonged to the Democratic Party of Iranian Kurdistan (KDPI) and was a non-profit TV station with programs in Kurdish, Persian, Arabic and Baluchi languages. Tishk TV had reporters in many countries including Iraq where real-time reporting produced on issues related to human rights and democracy promotion in Iran and across the Kurdish regions in Iran, Iraq, Turkey and Syria. From 2006-2022 the Democratic Party of Iranian Kurdistan PDKI had TISHK TV as their main channel but during August 2022 when the Democratic Party of Iranian Kurdistan PDKI and the Kurdistan Democratic Party HDK reunited with each other TISHK TV got replaced with the HDK TV channel Kurd Channel.

== Distribution ==
Hotbird-4 Frequency: 11585 MHz Polarization: V Symbol Rate: 27500
