= KDPI insurgency (1989–1996) =

Insurgency by the Kurdish Democratic Party of Iran

- Part of Iranian–Kurdish conflict
Date	13 July 1989 – 23 August 1996 (7 years, 1 month, 1 week and 3 days)
Location	Iranian Kurdistan
Result	Iranian victory: KDPI announces unilateral cease-fire in 1996; KDPI exiled to Degala, Iraqi Kurdistan and Democrat Castle; End of Kurdish military operations until 2004

Belligerents
Iran	KDP-I

Commanders and leaders
(Iran) Ali Khamenei (Iran) Akbar Hashemi Rafsanjani (Iran) Ali Shahbazi (Iran) Mohsen Rezaee	Sadegh Sharafkandi X Abdul Rahman Ghassemlou X Mustafa Hijri; Abdulla Hassanzadeh

Units involved
Islamic Republic of Iran Army; Islamic Revolutionary Guard Corps	PDKI Peshmerga

Casualties and losses
- Total 172–554 killed

The insurgency by the Kurdish Democratic Party of Iran surged in 1989, lasting until 1996, as part of the Kurdish separatism struggle. The eruption of the conflict in July 1989 was caused by the assassination of KDPI leader Abdul Rahman Ghassemlou by suspected Iranian government agents. The most violent episodes took place in 1990 and 1991, when Kurdish soldiers launched massive attacks on Iranian military bases in Kurdish areas of Iran. This brought heavy retaliation from the Iranian government, aiming to eradicate the KDPI leadership by assassinating Sadegh Sharafkandi and other KDPI leaders in 1992 in order to disable the Kurdish party's ability to function. The conflict faded with the effective targeted assassination policy of Iran and by 1996 KDPI was no longer able to function militarily and announced a unilateral ceasefire. The conflict claimed hundreds of lives, mostly Iranian government troops and Kurdish militants.

== Background ==
In 1979, a wide scale rebellion erupted, as the Kurdish Democratic Party of Iran and its Kurdish allies resisted the new regime. As the Islamic Revolutionary Guard Corps fought to re-establish government control in the Kurdish regions, more than 10,000 Kurds were killed during this process.

Pockets of KDPI insurgents continued to engage in low level fighting up until 1983, as the Iranian forces were diverted to the Iraqi front, with the escalation of the Iran–Iraq War.

While most of its military and political activity in Iran was greatly overpowered after the 1979 rebellion, the Kurdish Democratic Party of Iran (KDPI) had continued its opposition activities through 1980s. Nevertheless, the crackdown still continued—'Abd al-Rahman Qassemlou, leader of Kurdish Democratic Party of Iran, was assassinated in July 1989 by the Iranian government.

The immediate pretext for the renewed insurgency of KDPI was the event of February 1990, when thousands of Kurds demonstrated in seven Iranian towns and more than 500 were subsequently arrested. These protests are said to be due to the execution of 17 Kurdish activists. As a result of the crackdown, the KDPI renewed its military activities.

== Conflict timeline ==
=== 1989 ===
Abdul Rahman Ghassmlou, leader of the KDPI, was assassinated by suspected Iranian intelligence agents in Vienna, Austria on July 13, 1989. The assassination sparked an immediate escalation of the Kurdish-Iranian dispute. Government troops and Kurdish rebels clashed near Mahabad in September and October 1989, resulting in the deaths of 172 government soldiers.

=== 1990 ===
From April to August 1990, Kurdish militants mounted numerous attacks against government forces. Over 300 Iranian soldiers were killed and over 150 were captured. The Kurdish opposition freed 152 POWs as a humanitarian gesture on July 28, 1990.

In November 1990, Iranian security arrests a Kurdish soldier accused of allegedly killing two revolutionary guards in summer attacks.

=== 1991 ===
Through 1991, Iran increased the political crackdown, being accused by the KDPI over human rights violation. On 14 January 1991, Iran executed seven Kurds, all members of the KDPI, for "spying, murder and armed activities".

In March 1991, Iranian forces crossed over into Iraq and attacked Iranian opposition forces, including Kurdish forces. Throughout the summer, Iranian Kurdish militants mounted attacks against the Iranian Army, allegedly killing five Iranian surveyors near the Turkish border in August. KDPI guerrillas also set fire to an exhibition of industrial machinery and briefly take policemen hostage in the town of Mahabad in retaliation because of Iranian terrorist attacks.

=== 1992 ===
In early 1992, protest and fighting broke out in several Kurdish towns in western Iran. In the town of Bowkan 17 were killed or wounded. In March 1992, there were several reports of Iranian Kurds supposedly attacking Iran from across the Iraqi border.

On September 13, 1992, Iran and Turkey agreed to boost border security and clamp down on each other's Kurdish population. Each state's opposition uses the other state as a base for its operations.

On September 17, 1992, two gunmen, believed to be working for the Iranian government, shot at eight KDPI officials in Bonn, Germany. Three KDPI politicians including Sadegh Sharafkandi the secretary-general of the PDKI and their driver were assassinated.

=== 1993 ===
Through 1993, Iranian forces shelled Iranian Kurdish opposition forces in Iraq with both artillery and airplanes. Between April and May, 1993 Iranian forces crossed over into Iraq and attacked Kurdish forces. They eventually occupied a "security zone" of over 100 km^{2}. On August 9, 1993, Iranian forces crossed the border into Iraq and attacked Kurdish forces once again. In the autumn, Kurdish soldiers resumed their fighting against the Iranian Revolutionary Guards.

On November 15, 1993, Iran blows up a car in Iraqi Kurdistan killing six including 5 KDPI members. This and other incidents make both the UN and Amnesty International accuse the Iranian government of the political assassination of members of its Kurdish opposition.

=== 1994 ===
On January 7, 1994, a prominent member of the KDPI is assassinated by gunmen believed to be affiliated with Iranian security forces.

On August 17, 1994, the KDPI said that it has killed 15 Iranian Revolutionary Guards in a clash in western Iran. Two weeks later, on September 1, 1994, Iran's IRNA news agency said that Kurdish soldiers had blocked a highway in western Iran, set two military vehicles ablaze and wounded one person.

On September 25, 1994, Turkey and Iran agreed to stop opposition groups from operating in each other's territory. Following this, Iran launched a harsh crackdown on Kurdish population - on October 11, 1994, The Kurdish Democratic Party of Iran announced that four Kurdish villages had been demolished by Iran and that authorities had told the residents of five more villages to leave. On November 6–9, Iran bombed several Iranian Kurdish opposition groups in Iraq.

=== 1995 ===
In April 1995, a total of six Iranian Kurds were killed in attacks in Iraqi Kurdistan, by Iranian government agents. On June 5, another two members of an Iranian Kurdish group were shot down in Iraqi Kurdistan by Iranian government agents, according to the State Department's yearly report on terrorism. On August 4, 1995, The Democratic Party of Iranian Kurdistan said that Iranian government agents had assassinated its representative in Baghdad. Tehran denied the charges and claimed that the killings had been the result of political infighting among opposition forces.

In September and October, an Iranian Kurdish opposition group accused Iranian officials of torturing and executing ten Kurdish political prisoners who supported a banned political group, Democratic Party of Iranian Kurdistan (KDPI). Another 345 people were also arrested at this time for the same infraction.

Military clashes resumed on December 4, 1995, as the Democratic Party of Iranian Kurdistan killed 15 members of the Iranian security force in clashes in western Iran.

=== 1996 ===
On June 22, 1996, Turkish troops inside Iran murdered seven members of the KDPI in Iran. On July 10, Iranian agents exploded a car-bomb near a housing complex amidst the main concentration of KDPI refugee camps in northern Iraq. On July 28, Rahman Radjabi Hamvand, a member of KDPI, was executed. The charges against him stemmed from a complaint by a private individual that was later withdrawn.

On July 29, 1996, 3,000 Iranian troops entered Kurdish territory in northern Iraq in search of KDPI guerrillas, reportedly killing 20 members of KDPI, while displacing over 2,000 Iranian Kurd refugees. Iranian officials claimed that the attack was justified on the basis of self-defence

Following the operation, on August 4, 1996, KDPI members announced that they will stop cross border attacks from Iraq into Iran.

== Aftermath ==
Following the unilateral cease-fire announcement of 1996, the conflict of KDPI against the Iranian regime shifted to the political opposition. In April 1997, improved relations between Tehran and Ankara led to the deportation from Turkey to northern Iraq over 70 KDPI members. On April 13, Iranian Kurds accused Iranian officials of trying to poison KDPI members, after 85 Iranian Kurds were treated for food poisoning with a highly toxic substance.

The pressure upon the KDPI eased since the election of the moderate Mohammad Khatami's government in 1997.

On February 16, 1999, The arrest of PKK leader Abdullah Ocalan leads to riots by Kurds in Iran, especially in western Iran, as well as throughout Europe.

Renewed insurgency in Iranian Kurdistan was undertaken since 2004 by another Kurdish organization—the Party for the Free Life in Kurdistan (PJAK).

=== Resurging tensions ===
In January 2014, Iranian forces killed a KDPI party member, while he was disseminating leaflets.

In September 2014, in a number of clashes, the KDPI engaged Iranian security for the first time in many years, killing at least 6 Iranian soldiers. It was unclear whether this was a result of change of policy by the Democratic Party of Iranian Kurdistan (which evaded violence since 1996) or an isolated sequence of incidents.

In May 2015, a suspected Iranian attack (allegedly disguised as PKK fighters) on PJAK force on Iranian–Iraqi Kurdistan border resulted in 6 killed—2 KDPI and 4 PKK (or allegedly Iranian agents).

In June 2015, a PDKI attack on Revolutionary Guard forces reportedly left 6 people killed.

In 2016, the PDKI resumed its military insurgency against Iran.

== Responses ==
=== Iranian officials ===
On August 23, 1996, former president of Iran Abolhassan Banisadr stated that during the previous 15 years, the Iranian government ordered the killings of over 60 dissidents, including 4 KDPI leaders in Germany in 1992.

=== European Union ===
On April 10, 1997, a German court implicated the Iranian government in the deaths of 4 Kurdish dissidents in Germany in 1992. All EU countries, except Greece, recalled temporarily their ambassadors from Iran following the finding of the court, imposing limited diplomatic sanctions on Iran.

== See also ==
- List of modern conflicts in the Middle East
