= List of Iranian assassinations =

List of Iranian assassinations refers to a list of alleged and confirmed assassinations, reported to have been conducted by the Pahlavi Dynasty, by the Islamic Republic of Iran, or by opposition groups.

The Organization of Intelligence and National Security carried out political motivated assassinations against dissidents and opposition leaders during the reign of the Pahlavi Dynasty. Iranian security and intelligence have assassinated opposition members, most notably Kurdish dissidents of the Kurdish Democratic Party of Iran during the 1980s and 1990s.

== By Pahlavi regime (1953–1979) ==
Date	City	Country	Target	Position	Perpetrator
12 August 1970	Baghdad	Iraq	Teymur Bakhtiar	Former founder of SAVAK.	Alleged SAVAK operation.
29 June 1976	Tehran	Iran	Hamid Ashraf	Leader of Organization of Iranian People's Fedai Guerrillas.	A SAVAK operation.

== By the Islamic Republic of Iran ==
Date	City	Country	Target	Position	Perpetrator
7 December 1979	Paris	France	Shahriar Shafiq	Head of the Iran Azad Group, nephew of the last Shah of Iran	Muslim Liberation Group
22 July 1980	Bethesda, Maryland	United States	Ali Akbar Tabatabaei	President of the Iran Freedom Foundation, former press attache to the Iranian embassy	Dawud Salahuddin
7 February 1984	Paris	France	Gholam Ali Oveisi	Former Chief Commander of the Imperial Iranian Armed Forces	Islamic Jihad Organization
19 May 1987	Vienna	Austria	Hamid Reza Chitgar	Representative of Labor Party of Iran	Suspected Iranian agents
13 July 1989	Vienna	Austria	Abdul Rahman Ghassemlou	Head of the Democratic Party of Iranian Kurdistan	Suspected Iranian agents
13 July 1989	Vienna	Austria	Abdullah Ghaderi Azar	Assistant to the Head of Democratic Party of Iranian Kurdistan	Suspected Iranian agents
1 April 1990	Nynäshamn	Sweden	Karim Mohammedzadeh	Iranian Kurdish dissident	Reza Taslimi
24 April 1990	Coppet	Switzerland	Kazem Rajavi	Representative of the National Council of Resistance of Iran. Former Ambassador of Iran to the UN	Suspected Iranian agents
15 August 1990	Konya	Turkey	Elî Kaşifpûr	Member central committee of the Kurdistan Democratic Party of Iran	Suspected Iranian agents
6 September 1990	Västerås	Sweden	Efat Ghazi	Member of the Kurdistan Democratic Party of Iran	Suspected Iranian agents
11 July 1991	Tsukuba	Japan	Hitoshi Igarashi (allegedly)	Japanese translator of Salman Rushdie's the Satanic Verses	Suspected Iranian agents
6 August 1991	Suresnes	France	Shapour Bakhtiar	Former Prime Minister of Iran. Head of the National Resistance Movement of Iran	Ali Vakili Rad
7 August 1992	Bonn	Germany	Fereydoun Farrokhzad	Iranian dissident	Iranian-paid Basque separatists
17 September 1992	Berlin	Germany	Sadegh Sharafkandi	Head of the Democratic Party of Iranian Kurdistan	Mykonos restaurant assassinations
17 September 1992	Berlin	Germany	Fattah Abdoli	One of the leaders of the Democratic Party of Iranian Kurdistan	Mykonos restaurant assassinations
17 September 1992	Berlin	Germany	Homayoun Ardalan	One of the leaders of the Democratic Party of Iranian Kurdistan	Mykonos restaurant assassinations
17 September 1992	Berlin	Germany	Nouri Dehkordi	One of the leaders of the Democratic Party of Iranian Kurdistan	Mykonos restaurant assassinations
6 July 1996	Stockholm	Sweden	Kamran Hedayati	Iranian Kurdish dissident	Suspected Iranian agents
21 September 2010	Tehran	Iran	Abdoulreza Soudbakhsh	Iranian physician and university professor	Suspected Iranian agents
15 December 2015	Almere	Netherlands	Mohammad-Reza Kolahi Samadi	People's Mujahedin of Iran (MEK)	Suspected Iranian agents
29 April 2017	Istanbul	Turkey	Saeed Karimian	Iranian television executive, owner of Dubai-based GEM TV	VAJA
8 November 2017	The Hague	Netherlands	Ahmad Mola Nissi	Arab Struggle Movement	Suspected Iranian agents
14 November 2019	Istanbul	Turkey	Masoud Molavi	Ex-Islamic Revolutionary Guard Corps insider, whistleblower	Suspected Iranian agents

== By opposition groups ==
Date	City	Country	Target	Description	Perpetrator
11 March 1946	Tehran	Iran	Ahmad Kasravi	Iranian linguist, historian and Democrat Party member	Fada'iyan-e Islam
13 February 1948	Tehran	Iran	Mohammad Masud	Iranian journalist	Tudeh Party of Iran
5 November 1949	Tehran	Iran	Abdolhossein Hazhir	Prime Minister of Iran	Fada'iyan-e Islam
7 March 1951	Tehran	Iran	Haj Ali Razmara	Prime Minister of Iran	Fada'iyan-e Islam
27 January 1965	Tehran	Iran	Hassan Ali Mansur	Prime Minister of Iran	Fada'iyan-e Islam
23 April 1979	Tehran	Iran	Mohammad-Vali Gharani	Chief-of-Staff of the Iranian Army	Forghan group
1 May 1979	Tehran	Iran	Morteza Motahhari	President of Council of Islamic Revolution	Forghan group
2 November 1979	Tabriz	Iran	Mohammad Ali Qazi Tabatabaei	Representative of the Supreme Leader in East Azerbaijan	People's Mujahedin of Iran
28 June 1981	Tehran	Iran	Mosa Kalantari	Ministry of Roads & Urban Development	People's Mujahedin of Iran
28 June 1981	Tehran	Iran	Mohammad Beheshti	Chief Justice of Iran	People's Mujahedin of Iran
28 June 1981	Tehran	Iran	Mohammad Montazeri	Member of the Islamic Revolutionary Guards	People's Mujahedin of Iran
30 August 1981	Tehran	Iran	Mohammad-Ali Rajai	President of Iran	People's Mujahedin of Iran
30 August 1981	Tehran	Iran	Mohammad-Javad Bahonar	Prime Minister of Iran	People's Mujahedin of Iran
21 September 1981	Tabriz	Iran	Mir Asadollah Madani	Representative of the Supreme Leader in East Azerbaijan	People's Mujahedin of Iran
22 August 1998	Tehran	Iran	Asadollah Lajevardi	Iranian prosecutor	People's Mujahedin of Iran
10 April 1999	Tehran	Iran	Ali Sayad Shirazi	Iranian Army Commander	People's Mujahedin of Iran

== See also ==
- Chain murders of Iran
- List of massacres in Iran
- Targeted Killing in International Law
