= List of conflicts in Iran =

== 20th century ==
- 1905–1911 Constitutional Revolution
- 1914–1921 Jungle Rebellion
- 1919–1922 Simko Shikak revolt
- 1921 coup d'état
- 1921 Azerbaijan Crisis
- 1924 Sheikh Khazal rebellion
- 1926 Shikak revolt
- 1939–1945 Anglo-Soviet invasion
- 1953 coup d'état
- 1963 Uprising
- 1967 Kurdish revolt
- 1979 Revolution
- Kurdish separatism
  - 1979 Kurdish rebellion
  - 1989–1996 KDPI insurgency
- Arab separatism in Khuzestan
  - 1979 Khuzestan rebellion
- 1982 Amol uprising
- 1999 student protests

== 21st century ==
- Kurdish separatism
  - 2004— ongoing PJAK insurgency
- 2004— ongoing Sistan and Baluchestan insurgency
- 2009 presidential election protests
- 2011–2012 protests
- 2022—2023 Mahsa Amini protests

== See also ==
- List of wars involving Iran
