= Germany–Iran relations =

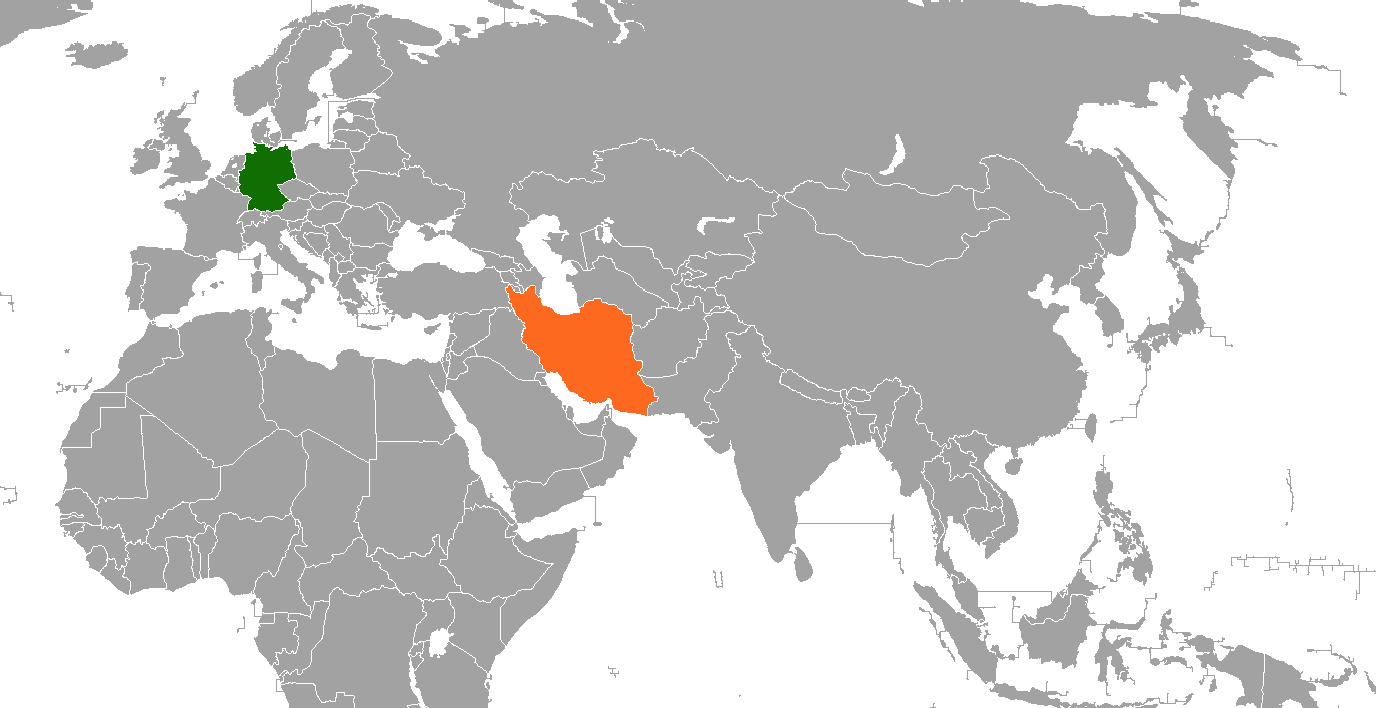

- Germany: Iran

Diplomatic mission
- Embassy of Germany, Tehran: Embassy of Iran, Berlin

Germany–Iran relations are the bilateral relations between Germany and Iran. Official diplomatic relations between Iran and Germany after World War II began in 1952, when Iran opened its first diplomatic mission office in Bonn. Both countries' predecessor states had maintained formal diplomatic relations since the end of the 19th century. Germany has an embassy in Tehran, which was originally established in the court of Naser al-Din Shah Qajar in October 1884 and has been in the present building since 1894. Iran opened its embassy in Berlin in 1885. Germany and Iran continued to have political relations well into World War II. In December 2022, Germany said it was "suspending state incentives to promote trade with Iran due to the repression of demonstrators."

== History ==
=== Qajar era ===
Unofficial relations between the German Reich and Iran date to the early 19th century. Goethe's dedication of his West-östlicher Divan (West-Eastern Divan) to Hafez in 1819 is an illustration of how far back such cultural ties go.

During the Qajar era, with the increasing unpopularity of world powers in Persia such as Russia and United Kingdom, especially after the Treaties of Turkmenchay and Gulistan and the revolt of Grand Ayatollah Mirza Hassan Shirazi in the Tobacco movement, many Iranian intellectuals began searching for a "third force", which could be relied upon as a potential ally: Germany, which had largely remained out of the Great Game.

When Iran's first modern university was first established, Amir Kabir preferred the hiring of Austrian and German professors for Darolfonoon. Even Nasereddin Shah supported the idea of hiring them to serve as Darolfonoon's faculty, despite political pressures towards the contrary. In that regard, it is even written that Amir Kabir always showed interest in discussing the structural system of Germany's government and society as a model for modernizing his country.

During the Constitutionalist movement of Guilan, German soldiers were actively involved in training the popular army of Mirza Kuchak Khan. Mirza's field commander was a German officer by the name Major Von Pashen who had joined the Jangal movement after being released from a British prison in Rasht: he was Mirza's closest ally. Another famous German agent in Iran (especially during World War I) was Wilhelm Wassmuss, nicknamed the "German Lawrence".

Among commercial treaties, one can mention the June 6th, 1873 treaty signed in Berlin between Prince Bismarck and Mirza Hussein Khan.

=== First Pahlavi era and Nazi Germany ===
In 1936, the head of Reichbank and the financial mastermind of Nazi Germany travelled to Tehran and many important commercial agreements were signed between the two countries. While some authors have stated the that Iranians were classified as "pure blood Aryans" and thus were excluded from the Nuremberg Laws, and some even have claimed Hitler himself declared Iran to be an "Aryan country", David Motadel has noted this to be false; the Nazis never declared Iranians to be Aryans, although for political reasons avoided discussion concerning it — the claims originate from the author Lenczowski. Iranian railways were constructed by German engineers. Railway companies were specifically ordered to avoid employing any person of Jewish descent in any of its subdivisions. Many gentile anti-Semites were preparing for the Johoudkoshan (Massacre of the Jews) and were warning Jews in the streets to leave Iran while they could. Nazi Germany had nightly broadcasts in Persian and was calling many leading Iranian politicians who had anti-German tendencies "crypto-Jews". Bahram Shahrukh, who was employed by German radio, performed fiery anti-Jewish broadcasts every night. In Purim 1941, Shahrukh promoted the idea of revenge for the massacre of the Purim in biblical times and suggested his Iranian followers attack the Jews. Nightly newspapers were distributed in Tehran and swastikas were often painted on Jewish homes and shops.

In order to fight the growing racial antisemitism among the Iranian population, many Jews and Arabs joined the Tudeh party and advocated for communism. Even though Jews comprised less than two percent of the Iranian population, almost fifty percent of the members of the Tudeh party were Jewish. The Tudeh party was the only Iranian political party to accept Jews. Most writers for publications of the party were Jewish. Furthermore, many Iranian Jews viewed communism as a Jewish movement since many leading members of the communist revolution in Russia were Jewish and were looked upon favorably by Persian Jews.

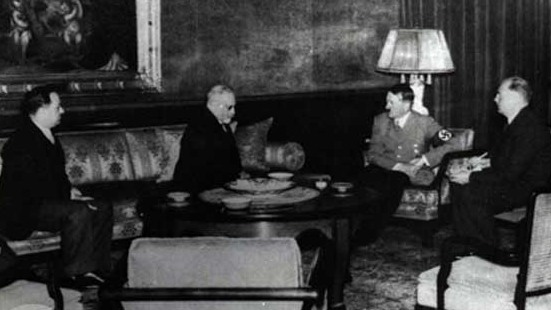
Hassan Esfandiary and Mussa Nuri Esfandiari, the Iranian ambassador to the German Reich, meeting Adolf Hitler

The shelling of Iran's parliament by the Russians and the signing of the 1919 treaty firmly planted the roots of suspicion against Britain and Russia. Many people were aware of Wilhelm II's speech in Damascus in 1898 calling on all Muslims to rely on him as a true friend. By the early 1930s, Reza Shah or the elder Reza Pahlavi's economic ties with Nazi Germany began worrying the Allied states. Germany's modern state and economy highly impressed the Shah, and there were hundreds of Germans involved in every aspect of the state from setting up factories to building roads, railroads and bridges.

Abdol Hossein Sardari, an Iranian junior diplomat, tried to save many Persian Jews from extermination by convincing many Nazi officials to leave them alone. Sardari was stationed in Paris at the time of the Nazi occupation. His efforts led the Nazis to issue a directive that Iranian Jews should be exempt from wearing the yellow star of David. It is said that Sardari gave out between 500 and 1,000 Iranian passports, without the consent of his superiors. His actions are believed to have saved 2,000 to 3,000 Jewish lives, as passports were issued for entire families.

In 1939, Germany provided Iran with the so-called German Scientific Library. The library contained over 7500 books selected "to convince Iranian readers... of the kinship between the National Socialist Reich and the Aryan culture of Iran". In various pro-Nazi publications, lectures, speeches, and ceremonies, parallels were drawn between the Shah and Hitler, and praises were given to the charisma and the virtue of the Führerprinzip.

For many decades, Iran and Germany had cultivated ties, partly as a counter to the imperial ambitions of Britain and Russia (later the Soviet Union). Trading with the Germans appealed to Iran because they did not have a history of imperialism in the region, unlike the British and the Russians.

From 1939 to 1941, Iran's top foreign trade partner (nearly 50% of its total trade) was Germany, which helped Iran in opening modern sea and air communications with the rest of the world.

Demands from the Allies for the expulsion of German residents in Iran, mostly workers and diplomats, were refused by the Shah. A British embassy report in 1940, estimated that there were almost 1,000 German nationals in Iran. According to Iran's Ettelaat newspaper, there were actually 690 German nationals in Iran (out of a total of 4,630 foreigners, including 2,590 British). Jean Beaumont estimates that "probably more than 3,000" Germans actually lived in Iran, but they were believed to have a disproportionate influence because of their employment in strategic government industries and Iran's transport and communications network".

However, the Iranians also began to reduce their trade with the Germans under Allied demands. Reza Shah even though in close ties with Axis, sought to appear neutral and to keep the Allies close, which was becoming increasingly difficult with the British and Soviet demands on Iran. Many British forces were already present in Iraq as a result of the Anglo-Iraqi War earlier in 1941. Thus, British troops were stationed on the western border of Iran prior to the invasion.

In 1941, partly because of his sympathies towards Germany, the Allies forced Reza Shah to abdicate the throne to his son, Mohammad Reza Pahlavi. His followers, who refused the British occupation of Iran, such as Fazlollah Zahedi and Mohammad Hosein Airom, shared similar fates. The British believed that Zahedi was planning a mass uprising against Allies, in cooperation with Nazi forces. He was arrested and found with German weapons and correspondence from a German agent. He was flown out of the country and interned in Palestine.

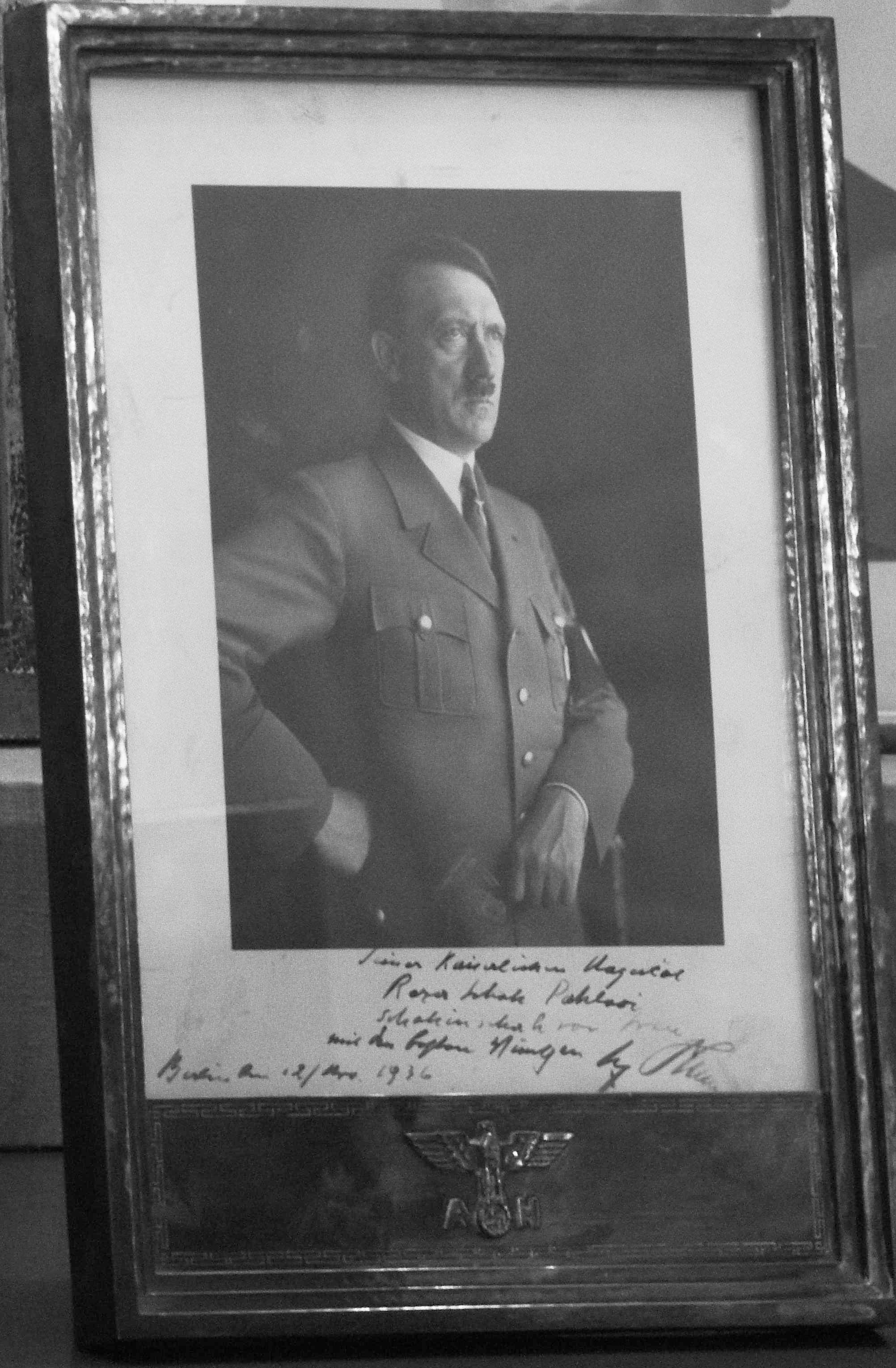
Signed Photograph of Adolf Hitler for Reza Shah Pahlavi in Original Frame with the Swastika and Adolf Hitler's (AH) Sign - Sahebgharanie Palace - Niavaran Palace Complex. The text below the photograph: His Imperial Majesty - Reza Shah Pahlavi - Shahanshah of Iran - With the Best Wishes - Berlin 12 March 1936 - The signature of Adolf Hitler

=== Second Pahlavi era ===
After the Second World War and the defeat of the Axis Powers, Iran incurred significant socioeconomic damage in many fields. It came under the inescapable diplomatic shadow of the United States, which reduced the chances of further deepening relations between Tehran and Bonn. Many Nazi generals and soldiers who fled the war, sought refuge in Iran, resulting in the continuation of Nazi ideologies and organizations in Iran. In commercial links, West Germany still remained well ahead of other European countries, even the United States, until 1974.

In 1972, after the visit to Tehran of West German Chancellor Willy Brandt, Iran and West Germany signed an economic agreement to provide for Iranian exports of oil and natural gas to Germany, with West German exports to and investments in Iran in return. However, given its huge surplus in foreign trade in 1974 and 1975, the Iranian government bought 25% of the shares of Krupp Hüttenwerke (German for smelting plants), the steel subsidiary of the German conglomerate Krupp, in September 1974. That provided the much-needed cash injection to Krupp, it also gave Iran access to German expertise to expand its steel industry. Iran's Bushehr nuclear power plant was also designed and partially built by the German Kraftwerk Union of Siemens, meanwhile, an agreement was inked. Along with the agreement, a letter of intent was also signed on November 10 by which the West German firm would construct four new 1,200-megawatt nuclear power stations in Iran over the next ten years. The letter was signed by the Atomic Energy Organization of Iran and a director of Siemens on behalf of Kraftwerk Union. The four new plants were to be built in pairs, two in Isfahan and two in the Markazi Province, probably near Saveh. The target date for the first plant to go on stream was 1984, with another plant expected to become operational in each of the following three years. Kraftwerk Union was already building two similar-sized nuclear power stations near Bushehr on the Persian Gulf, while a French consortium headed by the Creusot-Loire subsidiary Framatome was building two 900-megawatt nuclear plants along the Karun River south of Ahvaz.

In 1975, West Germany became the second supplier of non-military goods to Iran. Valued at $404 million, West German imports amounted to nearly one-fifth of total Iranian imports.

=== Since Iranian Revolution ===
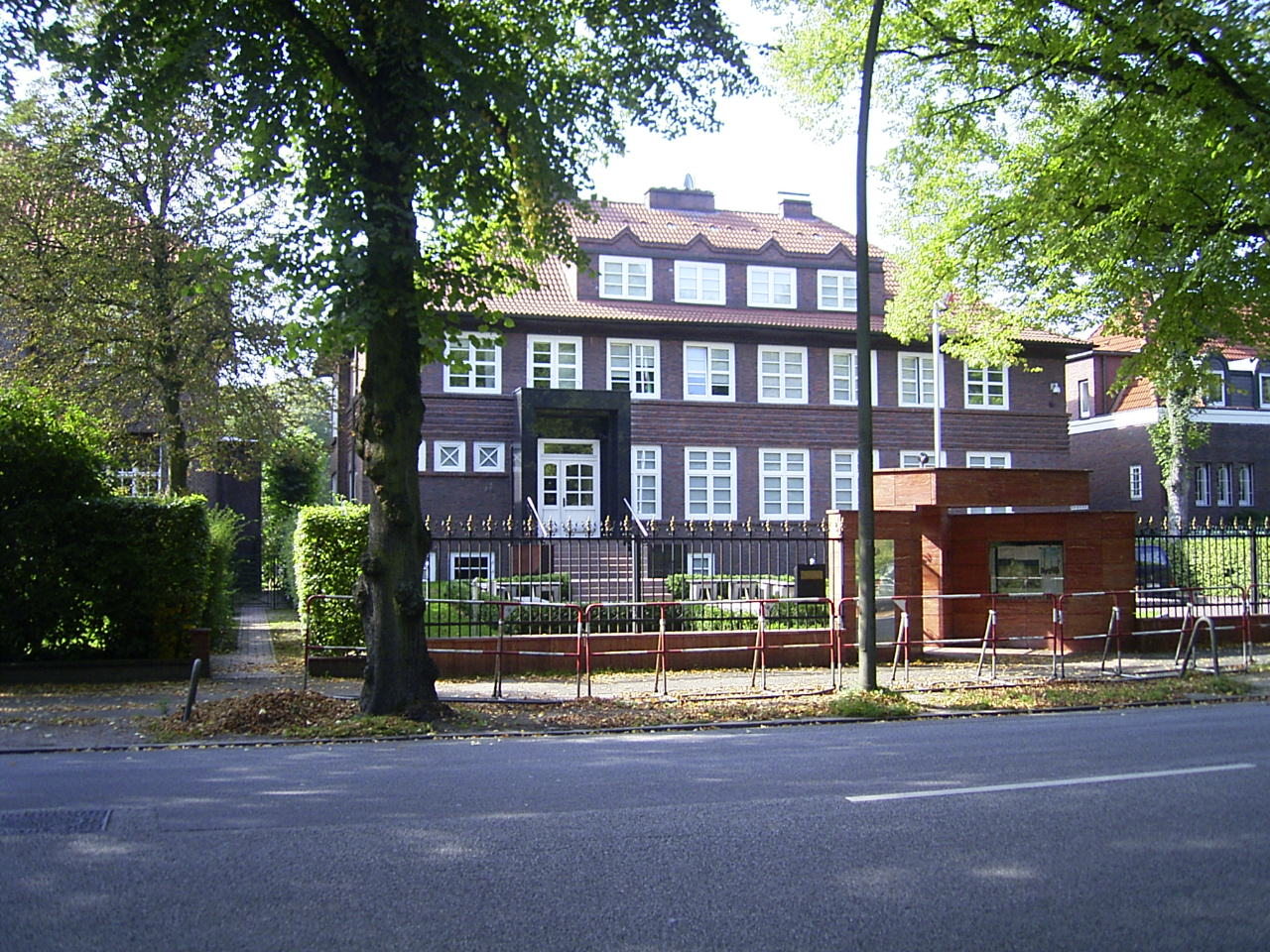
Iranian Consulate in Hamburg. There are a reported 100,000 Iranians living in Germany.

Hans-Dietrich Genscher was the first Western foreign minister to visit Iran after the Islamic Revolution in 1979, visiting Iran in 1984.

Although West Germany was a key technology supplier to Saddam Hussein during the Iran–Iraq War, especially to Saddam's chemical weapons program, Germany also kept open relations with Iran in some industrial and civilian technological sectors.

After the war, Germany increased trade with Iran, importing about €3.6 billion worth of German goods worth into Iran during 2004.

The 1992 Mykonos restaurant assassinations and Mykonos Trial in Berlin severely soured relations. On September 17, 1992, Kurdish Iranian insurgent leaders Sadegh Sharafkandi, Fattah Abdoli, Homayoun Ardalan and their translator Nouri Dehkordi were assassinated at the Mykonos Greek restaurant, in Berlin, Germany. In the Mykonos trial, the courts found Kazem Darabi, an Iranian national, who worked as a grocer in Berlin, and the Lebanese Abbas Rhayel, guilty of murder and sentenced them to life in prison. Two other Lebanese, Youssef Amin and Mohamed Atris, were convicted of being accessories to murder. In its 10 April 1997 ruling, the court issued an international arrest warrant for Iranian intelligence minister Hojjat al-Islam Ali Fallahian after it declared that the assassination had been ordered by him with knowledge of Supreme Leader Ali Khamenei and President Ayatollah Rafsanjani.

In a 2004 letter to Berlin Mayor Klaus Wowereit, Mahmoud Ahmadinejad, the then mayor of Tehran, objected to the commemorative plaque in front of the restaurant and called it an insult to Iran.

In 1999, a German, Helmut Hofer, was arrested in Tehran after he had an affair with an Iranian woman. That caused some tremors in the domestic political landscape and the diplomatic relations of Tehran-Berlin.

That was followed in 2005, when a German angler on vacation in the United Arab Emirates was arrested in the Persian Gulf and convicted to a prison sentence of 18 months. In 2009 a German lawyer, Andreas Moser, was arrested during the protests against the 2009 elections but was released after one week. Also in 2005, the hardline Iranian President Mahmoud Ahmadinejad stirred relations with comments directed against the Jewish Holocaust. However, Tehran's tensions with Germany and most of the rest of Europe have eased considerably in recent years after the election of the more moderate Hassan Rouhani as president in 2013.

=== 2000s to 2010s ===
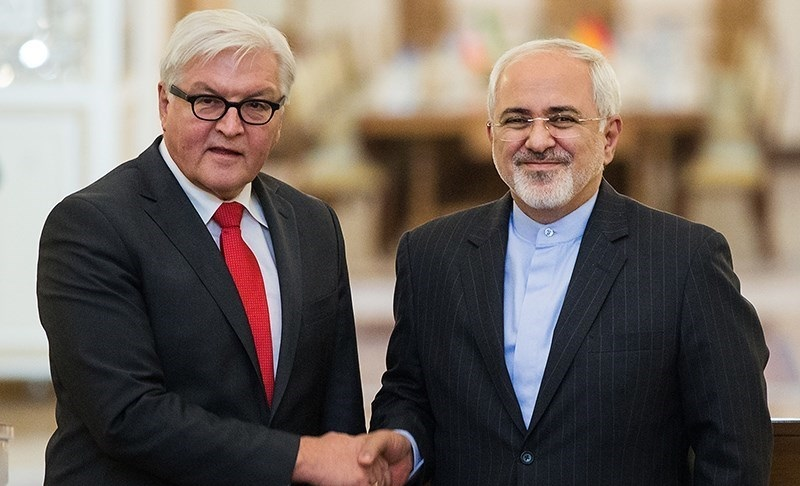
German Foreign Minister (now President) Frank-Walter Steinmeier meeting with Iranian Foreign Minister Mohammad Javad Zarif in Tehran

On 4 February 2006, the day that the International Atomic Energy Agency Board of Governors voted to refer ("report") Iran's case to the United Nations Security Council, German Chancellor Angela Merkel told the annual Munich Conference on Security Policy that the world must act to stop Iran from developing a nuclear bomb. With Germany having been one of the three European Union countries that had negotiated with Iran for two-and-a-half years in a bid to persuade Iran to stop its uranium enrichment program, Merkel said that Iran was a threat to both Europe and Israel.

In July 2015, Germany was the only non-UNSC nation that signed, along with the five UN Security Council's five permanent members, the Joint Comprehensive Plan of Action (JCPOA) with Iran, an agreement on the Iranian nuclear program. Following the U.S. withdrawal from the JCPOA in May 2018, Germany, along with the two other EU state signatories to the JCPOA (E3), issued a joint statement, which said, "It is with regret and concern that we, the Leaders of France, Germany and the United Kingdom take note of President Trump's decision to withdraw the United States of America from the Joint Comprehensive Plan of Action. Together, we emphasise our continuing commitment to the JCPoA. This agreement remains important for our shared security"

=== 2020s ===
In January 2020, Germany was among the E3 states that jointly formally informed the EU that they had registered their "concerns that Iran [was] not meeting its commitments under the JCPoA" and thereby triggered the dispute resolution mechanism under the JCPOA, a move that they said had "the overarching objective of preserving the JCPoA". The move was thought to be aimed at pushing the sides back to the negotiating table.

In September 2020, in the first coordinated move by the three countries, Germany, France and the UK summoned Iranian ambassadors in a joint diplomatic protest against Iran's detention of dual nationals and its treatment of political prisoners. In December 2020, Iran's Foreign Ministry summoned the envoys from France and Germany, which held the EU rotating presidency, to protest French and EU criticism of the execution of the journalist Ruhollah Zam.

On 3 November 2022, amid severe crackdown on protests by the Iranian government, the German government urged German citizens (concerning, "above all", dual German-Iranian citizens) to leave Iran, upon reported risks of arbitrary detentions and long prison terms. In November, the German parliament passed a comprehensive package of measures against the Islamic Republic following a session on the current situation in Iran, intended to increase pressure on the regime in Tehran.

In response to Iran sentencing German national Jamshid Sharmahd to death in February 2023, Germany summoned Iran's chargé d'affaires, declared two employees of the Iranian embassy personae non gratae and ordered them to leave the country. Annalena Baerbock said that Germany would "not accept this massive breach of a German citizen's rights." In retaliation, Iran declared two German diplomats as personae non gratae and ordered them to leave the country, accusing Germany of interfering in its judicial affairs.

In April 2024, Iran's foreign ministry summoned the ambassadors of Britain, France, and Germany to question what it referred to as their "irresponsible stance" regarding its drone and missile attack against Israel.

In July 2024, Iran's foreign ministry summoned the German ambassador over Germany's decision to ban the Islamic Centre Hamburg (IZH) association; the Federal Ministry of the Interior had argued the IZH acted as a direct representative of Iran's Supreme Leader and sought to bring about an Islamic revolution in Germany that would create theocratic rule.

In October 2024, Germany announced that it would shut all three Iranian consulates on its territory in reaction to the execution of German-Iranian national Jamshid Sharmahd but allowed the embassy to remain open.

In June 2025, German Chancellor Friedrich Merz praised Israeli strikes on Iran and stated that Israel is "doing the dirty work for us" in Iran. The Iranian government described the comments by Merz as "shameful", and summoned the German ambassador in response.

In July 2025, a Danish citizen was arrested in Germany for allegedly spying for Iran, collecting information for a possible attack on Jews in Germany.

A 2025 Die Welt investigation reported that Iran's Ministry of Intelligence intensified coercion of Iranian dissidents in Germany to act as informants by threatening their relatives in Iran, with the National Council of Resistance of Iran documenting 97 similar cases that year.

In October 2026, Germany summoned Iranian ambassador Majid Nili Ahmadabadi after the Hanseatic Higher Regional Court sentenced two men for planning to kill Josef Schuster and Volker Beck; the court had found that ‌one of the men had been steered by Iran's intelligence service. In response, Germany's ambassador to Iran Axel Dittmann was summoned to the ministry of foreign affairs over "baseless accusations," Iranian media reported.

== Activities of the Iranian government in Germany ==
Extensive activities by Iranian intelligence services are known to have taken place in Germany, some of which are closely linked to diplomatic missions in Germany. The Federal Office for the Protection of the Constitution (BfV) identifies the Iranian Ministry of Intelligence (MOIS) and the Islamic Revolutionary Guard Corps (IRGC) as the main actors. The intelligence services aiming the Iranian diaspora through surveillance, intimidation, and repression of family members in Iran.

Institutions such as the Islamic Centre Hamburg (IZH), which was banned in 2024, were also controlled via the Iranian embassy in order to exert influence on Shiite communities and promote radical ideologies in line with the ideology of the Islamic Republic of Iran. spread.

== Trade ==
Around 50 German firms have their own branch offices in Iran, and more than 12,000 firms have their own trade representatives in Iran. Several renowned German companies are involved in major Iranian infrastructure projects,l especially in the petrochemical sector, like Linde, BASF, Lurgi, Krupp, Siemens, ZF Friedrichshafen, Mercedes, Volkswagen and MAN (2008).

In 2005, Germany had the largest share of Iran's export market with $5.67 billion (14.4%). In 2008, German exports to Iran increased 8.9% and were 84.7% of the total German-Iranian trade volume.

The overall bilateral trade volume until the end of September 2008 stood at €3.23 billion, compared to €2.98 billion the previous year. The value of trade between Tehran and Berlin has increased from around 4.3 billion euro in 2009 to nearly 4.7 billion euro in 2010. According to German sources, around 80% of machinery and equipment in Iran is of German origin.

The German Chambers of Industry and Commerce (DIHK) has estimated that economic sanctions against Iran may cost more than 10,000 German jobs and have a negative impact on the economic growth of Germany. Sanctions would hurt especially medium-sized German companies, which depend heavily on trade with Iran.

There has been a shift in German business ties with Iran from long-term business to short-term and from large to mid-sized companies that have fewer business interests in the US and thus are less prone to American political pressure. Around 100 German companies have branches in Iran and more than 1000 businesses work through sales agents, according to the German-Iranian Chamber of Industry and Commerce.

After the official agreement between Iran and the West during the Iran nuclear deal, Germany's economic relations with Iran began increasing once more. German exports to Iran grew more than 27% from 2015 to 2016.

On 20 October 2018, the Association of German Banks stated that exports from Germany to Iran have reduced to 1.8 billion euros since January.

In 2022, Germany cancelled all export guarantees for companies dealing with Iran as a reaction to violent protests in the Islamic republic. German business deals with Iran were booming prior to 2022, as it exported €1.2 billion worth of goods, mostly automobile parts and pharmaceuticals. Iran has the largest automotive market in the Middle East region and many of the world's car makers intend to enter or re-enter Iran's market after sanctions are lifted.

In March 2025, Germany's Federal Financial Supervisory Authority (BaFin) issued a supervisory notice addressing the risks posed by circumvention transactions in the context of anti-money laundering and counter-terrorism financing. These transactions are designed to bypass legal or regulatory restrictions, often by concealing the origin of funds or disguising the identity of involved entities. Within this notice, Iran was the only country explicitly identified as a high-risk focus. BaFin emphasized the need for German financial institutions to exercise heightened scrutiny over transactions potentially linked to Iranian trade, citing the risk of circumventing international sanctions. This focus is informed in part by findings of the Financial Action Task Force (FATF), which has repeatedly cited Iran for systemic deficiencies in countering money laundering and the financing of terrorism.

== Resident diplomatic missions ==
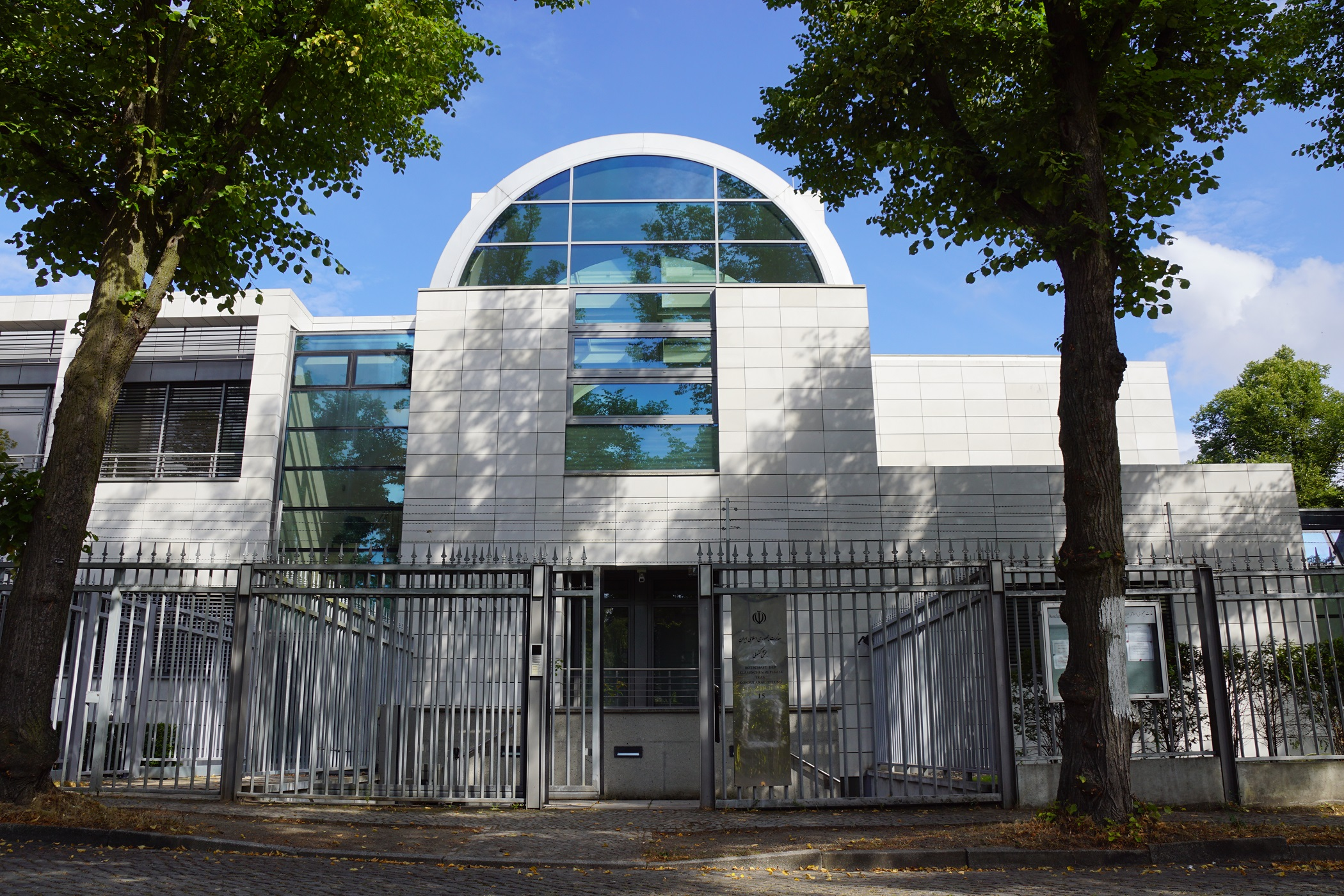
Embassy of Iran in Berlin

- Germany has an embassy in Tehran.
- Iran has an embassy in Berlin and till 2024 consulates-general in Frankfurt, Hamburg and Munich.

== See also ==
- Foreign relations of Germany
- Foreign relations of Iran
- German Embassy School Tehran
- Iranians in Germany
- Bernd Erbel
- Iran–EU relations
- Iranian external operations
- Marco Polo operation
- 2024 Iranian operations inside Australia
- Joint statement on Iranian state threat activity in Europe and North America
