= 1967 Kurdish revolt in Iran =

Kurdish Marxist revolt against the Pahlavi state

- Part of Iranian–Kurdish conflict
Date	1967–1968 (according to Entessar); 1966–1967 (according to UOA)
Location	Iranian Kurdistan (West Azerbaijan and Kurdistan province), Iran
Result	Iranian victory: KDPI retreats into underground tunnels in Qandil Mountains until 1979

Belligerents
(Iran) Pahlavi Iran; Supported by: Kurdistan Democratic Party of Iraq	Revolutionary Committee leadership: KDP-I; Kurdish tribesmen

Commanders and leaders
(Iran) Mohammad Reza Pahlavi (Iran) Bahram Aryana (Iran) Mohammad Hossein Zargham (Iran) Ezzatollah Zarghami (Iran) Gholam Ali Oveissi (Iran) Mohsen Mobasher (Iran) Nematollah Nassiri	Abdul Rahman Ghassemlou; Abdollah Muini †; Suleiman Moini (executed); Mullah Aware †; Ismail Sharif Zadeh †; Qadir Sharif

Units involved
Imperial Gendarmerie; Imperial Iranian Army; Shahrbani; SAVAK	PDKI Peshmerga

Casualties and losses
50+	Eight leaders assassinated or executed 40+ killed by Iranian forces
- Total: 108 killed

The 1967 Kurdish revolt in Iran (Sorani Kurdish: شۆڕشی ١٩٦٧ی کورد لە ئێران) erupted in March 1967, as part of the long-running Iranian–Kurdish conflict. Abrahamian describes the revolt as a Marxist insurgency with the aim of establishing autonomy for Kurds in Iran, modeled as a federal republic. The revolt, consolidating several tribal uprisings which had begun in 1966, was inspired by the First Iraqi–Kurdish War in neighboring Iraq and enjoyed the support of the recovering Kurdish Democratic Party of Iran, previously crushed during the 1946 Iran crisis. The 1967 revolt, coordinated into a semi-organized campaign in the Mahabad-Urumiya region by the revived KDPI party, was entirely subdued by the central Iranian government.

== Background ==
By 1941, when Reza Shah was deposed by the occupying British, his government had had some success in "pacifying" Kurdish tribes. In 1943, an important Kurdish party was established in Iran – the Committee of Kurdish Youth (Komala-i-Zhian-i-Kurd) – and in 1945 the movement transformed into the Kurdish Democratic Party of Iran (KDPI). Both parties challenged the central Iranian government after World War II.The separatist conflict escalated in 1945, fuelled by Soviet support to the Kurds, and eventually leading to the Iran crisis of 1946, which included an attempt of KDPI to establish the independent Republic of Mahabad in Iranian Kurdistan. The attempt failed, with the military victory of the Iranian forces and the Republic was abolished, with its leaders executed. Some 1,000 died during the crisis. In the aftermath of Mahabad's collapse, the KDP-I "effectively ceased to exist", with an exception of a handful of exiles in Iraq. The party's urban supporters essentially disappeared into obscurity and, for the next 15 years, there was virtually no Kurdish political activity. The absence of a local Kurdish armed force in Iran, and of a large urban population ready to be mobilized against the central government, left Iranian Kurds waiting for an external shock to provide an opportunity, much as the Second World War had.

== Revival of KDPI and Kurdish battle of 1967 ==
The shock for the Iranian Kurdish national movement came with the eruption of the First Iraqi–Kurdish War in neighboring Iraq in 1961. When the 1958–1961 rapprochement in Iraq collapsed, the KDP-Iran supported Iraqi Kurds; in the process, the leadership and subsequent social orientation of both Iran's and Iraq's Kurdish Democratic Parties turned conservative. Facing a newly consolidated Iraqi government by 1965, Mulla Mustafa turned against his former military allies and KDP-I supporters and came to an agreement with the Shah, that called for him to "restrain" KDP-I activities against the Iranian government. Mullah Mustafa went further, "subordinating the struggle in Iran to that in Iraq" and "warning that KDP-Iran militants would not be tolerated in Iraqi Kurdistan". The result of this was that the conservative leadership of the KDP-Iran was ousted and new, mostly former Iranian Tudeh (Communist) Party leaders took over the party's leadership. They formed a Revolutionary Committee and declared their support for sporadic peasant uprisings against the National Police around Mahabad and Urmia. Lacking a significant social base, this new leadership was quickly crushed: even though the KDPI's forces managed to inflict losses on the Iranian army, they failed due to lack of logistical support. Within months, eight of the eleven members of the Revolutionary Committee had been murdered by Iranian soldiers, and the movement lasted less than eighteen months. Over 40 KDPI party members were killed and their bodies handed over by Mullah Mustafa's men to the Iranian authorities.

== Aftermath ==
The surviving KDPI elements re-consolidated following the defeat, with bitterness against the betrayal of Mullah Mustafa. From March 1970, a new "Provisional Central Committee" began to prepare a new part program, approved at the third KDPI party conference in Baghdad in June 1971. During the third conference a new party secretary-general was elected – Abd al-Rahman Qasimlu. Under his guidance, the Third Congress in 1973 adopted the slogan "Democracy for Iran, autonomy for Kurdistan", committing for the armed struggle. Over the next years, KDPI found itself in-line with other opponents of the government, cooperating with some of the Marxist as well as Islamic parties.

The game changed with the Islamic Revolution of 1979, which failed to provide the Kurdish demands for autonomy, but on the contrary faced those with an even harsher bitterness than the previous monarch regime. The conflict between the new Iranian government and the KDPI and its allies gradually escalated, until reaching a point of no-return in March 1979. The outbreaking rebellion was led by the KDPI and its allies in Iranian Kurdistan, becoming the most violent uprising against the new Iranian government, following the Iranian Revolution of February 1979. The Kurdish rebellion was defeated in December 1982, with 10,000 killed and 200,000 displaced.

Though defeated, the KDPI turned to open fighting once again between 1989 and 1996, as an insurrection by the KDPI took place in Iranian Kurdistan, due to the assassination of its exiled leader Ghassemlou in July 1989 by Iranian negotiators. The KDPI insurrection ended in 1996, when the KDPI announced a unilateral cease fire, having been subdued by targeted assassinations of its leaders and a crackdown on its supporters in Iran. Since the Iranian elections on 1997, a more moderate government eased the crackdown on KDPI as well. KDPI has retained a low level political activity in exile through the late 1990s and early 2000s, signing a cooperation agreement with Komala in 2012.

== See also ==
- Iranian Kurdistan
- Kurdish people
- List of modern conflicts in the Middle East
