= Homayoun Ardalan =

Kurdistan Democratic representative of Iran in Germany

Homayun Ardalan
- ھۆمایون ئەردەڵان
- Born: 2 February 1950; Saqqez, Kurdistan Province, Imperial State of Iran
- Died: 17 September 1992 (aged 42); Berlin, Germany
- Cause of death: Assassination
- Resting place: Père Lachaise Cemetery, Paris, France
- Citizenship: Iran
- Title: The Official representative of the Democratic Party of Iranian Kurdistan (PDKI) in Germany
- Term: 1989–1992
- Political party: Democratic Party of Iranian Kurdistan (PDKI)

Homayoun Ardalan (Kurdish: ھۆمایون ئەردەڵان, Homayoun Ardalan; 2 February 1950 – 17 September 1992) was the official representative of the Kurdistan Democratic Party of Iran in Germany and a member of the Central Committee of this party. Ardalan was killed along with Sadegh Sharafkandi, Fattah Abdoli and Nouri Dehkordi during the 1992 Mykonos restaurant assassinations, in Berlin.

== Early life and career ==
Homayoun Ardalan was born on 2 February 1950, in Saqqez, Kurdistan Province, Iran. He was from the Ardalan family of Saqqez in Rojhalat and the son of Saifullah Khan Ardalan. With the beginning of the Revolution of 1978, he dropped out of Kurdistan University in Sanandaj and became a member of the Kurdistan Democratic Party of Iran. In 1983, he was elected a member of the Central Committee of the Democratic Party, after which he was transferred to the Saqqez Party Committee. After the Eighth Party Congress in 1987, he left for Germany to represent the Democratic Party in that country. He lived in Frankfurt.

== Death ==
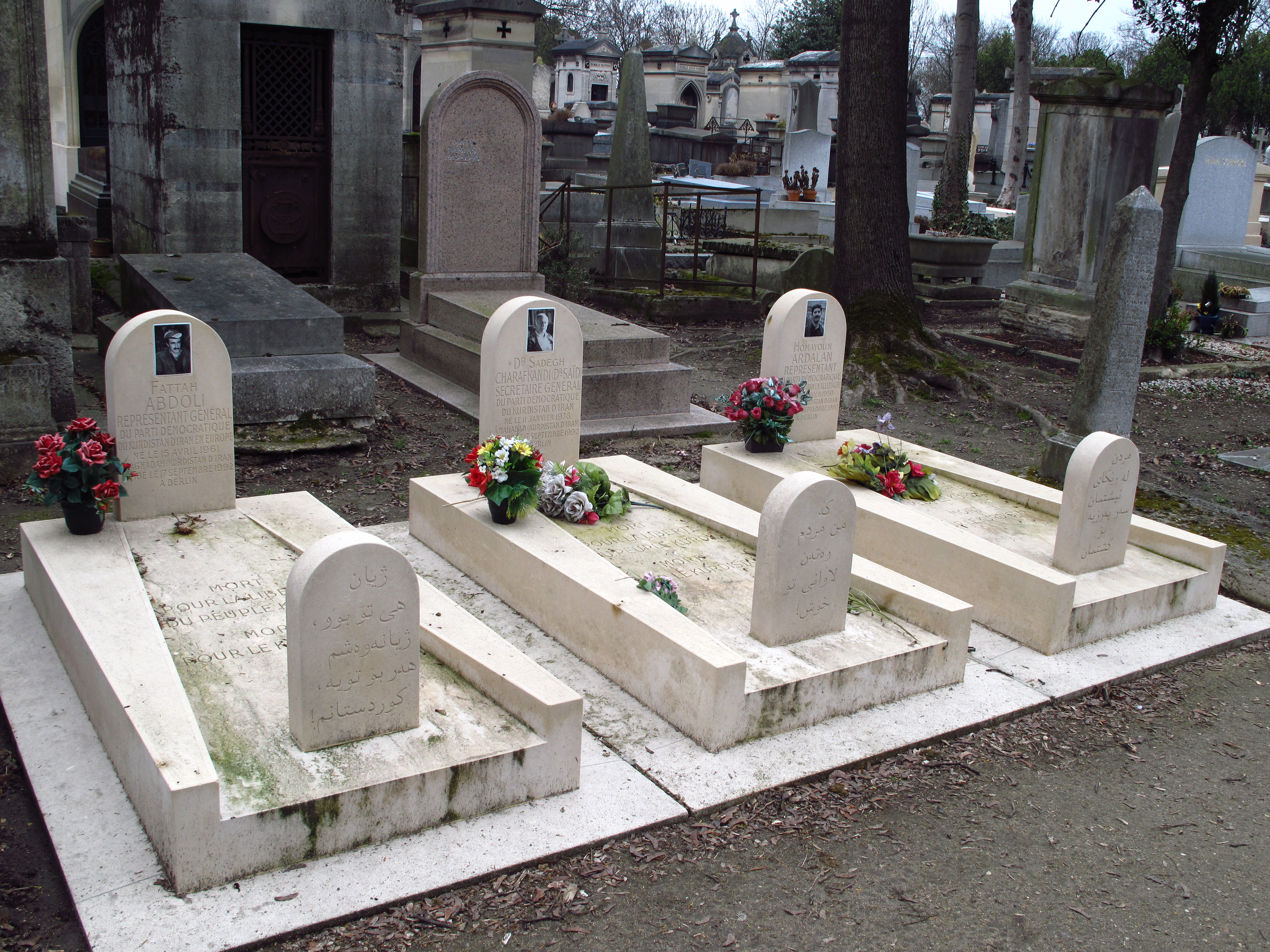
Graves of Fattah Abdoli, Sadegh Charafkandi and Homayoun Ardalan, three victims of the Mykonos assassination attempt, in the Père Lachaise Cemetery (Paris).

Ardalan was murdered in the Mykonos restaurant assassinations on 17 September 1992. On the evening of September 17, at 10:47 p.m., two masked men burst into the back room of Mykonos restaurant and began shooting at the four Kurdish exiles around the table. Three of them died where they fell: Dr Sadegh Sharafkandi, the Secretary General of the Democratic Party of Iranian Kurdistan (PDKI), Fattah Abdoli and Homayoun Ardalan both PDKI Central Committee members. The fourth person was Nouri Dehkordi, a Kurdish political activist who was serving as a translator. Dehkordi was struck by seven bullets and later died in hospital.

In the Mykonos trial, the courts found Kazem Darabi, an Iranian national who worked as a grocer in Berlin, and Lebanese Abbas Rhayel, guilty of murder and sentenced them to life in prison. Two other Lebanese, Youssef Amin and Mohamed Atris, were convicted of being accessories to murder. In its 10 April 1997 ruling, the court issued an international arrest warrant for Iranian intelligence minister Hojjat al-Islam Ali Fallahian after declaring that the assassination had been ordered by him with knowledge of Iranian supreme leader Grand Ayatollah Ali Khamenei and president Ayatollah Rafsanjani.
