= 2015 Mahabad riots =

2015 riots in Iran

On 7 May 2015, ethnic Kurds rioted in Mahabad, Iran, following the unexplained death on 4 May 2015 of Farinaz Khosravani, a 25-year-old Kurdish hotel chambermaid. Khosravani fell to her death from a fourth-floor window of the Tara, the hotel where she worked. Anger mounted following reports that Khosravani died attempting to escape an Iranian Revolutionary Guard official who allegedly raped her. The rioters reportedly set fire to the hotel. At least 25 people were wounded in the riot.

Unrest and violence spread to other Kurdish cities in Iran, such as Sardasht, where police clashed with hundreds of protesters on 9 May 2015.

One protester was reportedly killed in the clashes, and that additionally, Kurdish insurgent group PJAK had attacked an Iranian checkpoint killing two Iranian personnel, according to PJAK. According to ARA sources, as of May 11, the death toll climbed to 6 protesters killed.

In response to the mass protests, the Iranian government reacted by executing an alleged 84 of its supporters and arresting dozens more. As a result, the Democratic Party of Iranian Kurdistan announced it was reviving its armed struggle early in 2016.

== See also ==
- Kurdish separatism in Iran
- February 1999 Kurdish protests
- Western Iran clashes (2016–2023)
- Western Iran clashes (2026–present)
