= Fadhil Rassoul =

Kurdish politician

- فازیل ڕەسوڵ
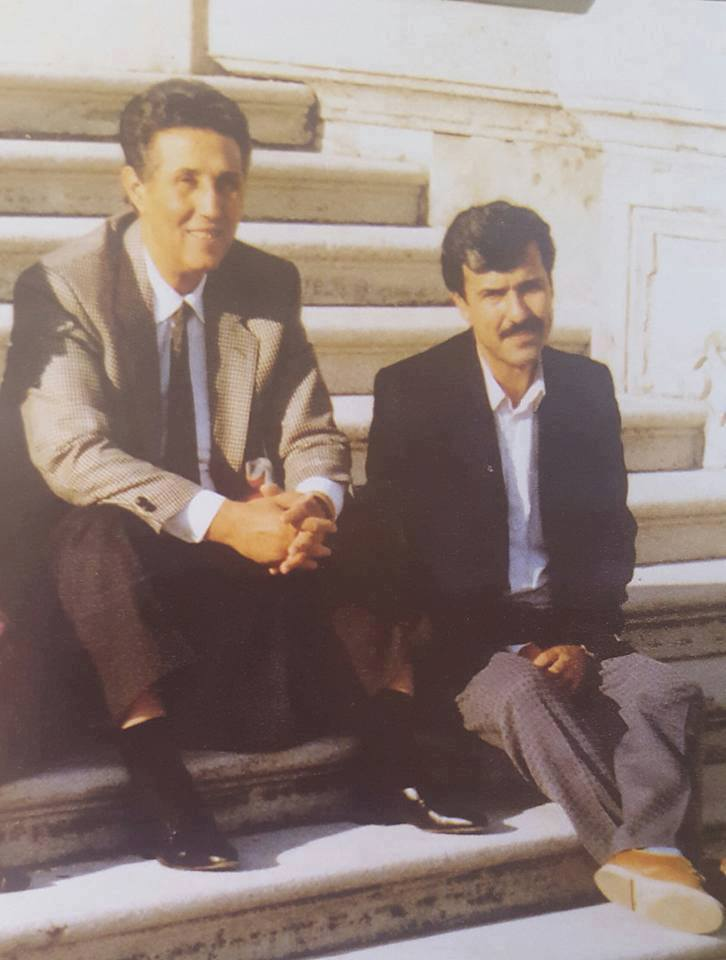
- Fadhil Rassoul with former Algerian President Ahmed Ben Bella
- Born: 1947; Sulaymaniyah, Eastern Arabia
- Died: 13 July 1989 (aged 41–42); Vienna, Austria
- Cause of death: Assassination
- Other name: Fadil Rasoul
- Education: University of Vienna
- Occupations: Academic, author, politician
- Years active: 1970s–1989
- Known for: Mediation between Kurdish and Iranian governments, Political writings
- Notable work: هكذا تكلم علي شريعتي - Grossmachtpolitik und Freiheitskampf: Kurdistan und die sowjetische Nahost-Politik
- Spouse: Susanne Rasoul-Rockenschaub

Fadhil Rassoul (Kurdish: فازیل ڕەسوڵ; 1947–1989) was an academic at the University of Vienna. He was born in Slemani, Kurdistan Region and was assassinated by the Iranian government in Vienna together with Abdul Rahman Ghassemlou while acting as mediator.

In the late 1970s he moves from Kurdistan to Beirut and works at a center called Center for Palestinian Studies. In 1980 he moves to Vienna where he complets his PhD in 1985. At the time of his assassination he was the editor of Algerian magazine El Hiwar (The Dialogue) by Ahmed Ben Bella, former president of Algeria who is also reported as a friend of his.

He is better known amongst Arabic readers as his works are in Arabic. He is best known for his book titled "This is how Ali Shariati spoke" written in Arabic. He is said to have completed his PhD in Berlin in 1985 with the title: "Superpower Policy and Freedom Struggle - Kurdistan and Soviet Middle East Policy" and also reported as being a researcher at "Austrian Institute of International Relations" and in other sources as a freelancer at the same institute. He is known to have been a left leaning academic but goes through a radical change to become a moderate Islamist and starts befriending Islamic scholars.

== Books ==
=== In Arabic ===
- من تاريخ الحركة الثورية في إيران - دار الكلمة للنشر بيروت 1979
- هكذا تكلم علي شريعتي - دار الكلمة للنشر بيروت 1987

=== In German ===
- Irak-Iran: Ursachen und Dimensionen eines Konflikts -Böhlau - 1987
- Grossmachtpolitik und Freiheitskampf: Kurdistan und die sowjetische Nahost-Politik - Junius – 1988
- Kultureller Dialog und Gewalt. Aufsätze zu Ethnizität, Religion und Staat im Orient – Edition M - 1991
