= Mustafa Hijri =

Iranian Kurdish politician (b. 1945)

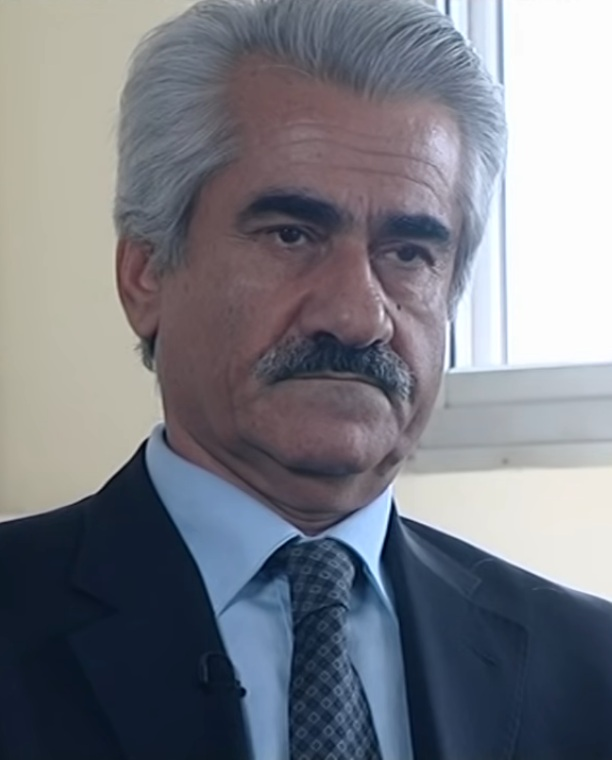
- Mustafa Hijri talks to BBC Persian, July 2011
- Born: 1 January 1945 (age 81); Naqadeh, West Azarbaijan Province, Imperial State of Iran
- Education: University of Tehran
- Political party: Democratic Party of Iranian Kurdistan

Mustafa Hijri (Kurdish: مستەفا هیجری, romanized: Mistefa Hicrî; Persian: مصطفی هجری; born 1 January 1945) is an Iranian-Kurdish politician who is the current leader of the Democratic Party of Iranian Kurdistan (KDPI), and a prominent figure within the Congress of Nationalities for a Federal Iran (CNFI). Hijri has been a member of the KDPI continuously since 1979.

== Political life ==
Born to a Kurdish family in 1945 in the city of Naqadeh in the West Azarbaijan Province of Iran, Hijri graduated from the Teachers' College of Agriculture in Urmia in 1963 and took up a post as a secondary school teacher in Oshnavieh. In 1970, he started studying Persian literature at Tehran University, where he obtained a bachelor's degree. On returning to his home town, he restarted teaching at secondary schools and a college.

Participating in the 4th Congress of the PDKI in 1979, he was elected as a member of the Central Committee, and a few months later, chosen as a member of the Political Bureau, since Dr. Abdul Rahman Ghassemlou was assassinated on 13 July 1989. Following the death of Dr. Ghassemlou, and on late Dr. Sadegh Sharafkandi’s appointment's as General Secretary, Hijri was once more chosen to the membership of the Political Bureau, and Vice-General Secretary.

Since the 12th Congress up to the 13th Congress he carried out his duties as a member of Political Bureau. He promotes federalism as a model for governance and power sharing in Iran. In his view, federalism must be based on geography and ethnicity, and this helps in resolving grievances of different ethnic groups in Iran. In addition, he attempted to push for coexistence between Kurds and Azerbaijanis in northwestern Iran. He was reelected to the position of General Secretary in the 14th Congress of PDKI held in September 2008.

Party political offices
Preceded by Abdullah Hasanzadeh	Secretary-General of the Democratic Party of Iranian Kurdistan; 2004–present	Incumbent
