= Congress of Nationalities for a Federal Iran =

Iranian Political Alliance

The Congress of Nationalities for a Federal Iran (CNFI) is a political alliance of political parties and advocacy groups, operating mostly underground or exiled, which campaigns for the replacement of the current Islamist government system in Iran with a secular, democratic, federal system. Many of the member groups are concurrent advocates for the rights or self-determination of non-Persian Iranians, including Azeris, Kurds, Arabs, Turkmen, and Baloch.

The CNFI does not have a formally designated single leader, though prominent figures such as Mustafa Hijri, leader of the Democratic Party of Iranian Kurdistan (PDKI), have played influential roles within the alliance. The CNFI emerged from a conference held in London on 20 February 2005. The alliance was formally co-founded by representatives of Kurdish, Azeri, Baloch, Turkmen, and Arab political groups.

Following its formation, the CNFI issued a foundational manifesto after a February 2005 summit. The manifesto outlined key principles such as:

- Separation of religion and state
- Protection of cultural and linguistic rights
- Equitable distribution of national resources
- Rejection of ethnic partition in favor of federal autonomy

It has also called for antipersonnel landmines to be banned in Iran.

The CNFI seeks to address Iran's multi-ethnic composition, in which Persians make up approximately 61% of the population, through decentralized governance. The organization argues that federalism is a solution to ethnic marginalization and unrest caused by centralized theocratic rule.

The alliance promotes federalism as a middle ground between authoritarian centralism and ethnic secession. However, critics within Iran have accused the CNFI of promoting separatism under the guise of federalism.

The Congress of Nationalities for a Federal Iran held a conference in Frankfurt, Germany in 2016.

== Member organizations ==
As of 2026, the Congress of Nationalities for a Federal Iran (CNFI) comprises the following organizations:

- United Front of Balochistan – Iran
- Balochistan People's Party
- Turkmen Sahra Cooperation Council, a coalition comprising the Turkmen Sahra Solidarity Council, Turkmen People's Cultural and Political Society, and Turkmen Sahra Union Party
- Party of United Lurestan and Bakhtiari
- Democratic Solidarity Party of Al-Ahwaz
- Democratic Party of Iranian Kurdistan
- Komala Party of Iranian Kurdistan
- Organisation of Kurmanj People
- Azerbaijan Cultural and Political Society
- Democratic Party of Azerbaijan
- Turkmen Sahra National Movement
