= Democratic Party of Iranian Kurdistan =

Kurdish political party in Iran

Democratic Party of Iranian Kurdistan حیزبی دێموکراتی کوردستانی ئێران
- Secretary-General: Mustafa Hijri
- Spokesperson: Khalid Azizi
- Founder: Qazi Muhammad
- Founded: 16 August 1945; 81 years ago
- Headquarters: Democrat Castle, (closed since September 2023) Koya, Iraqi Kurdistan Historically: Mahabad, Iran
- Women's wing: Kurdistan Democratic Women's Union of Iran
- Membership: 1,200 (2008)
- Ideology: Kurdish separatism Democratic socialism Social democracy Progressivism; Secularism; Historically: Anti-imperialism; Conservative traditionalism
- Political position: Centre-left; Historically: Left-wing
- National affiliation: Coalition of Political Forces of Iranian Kurdistan (2026–present); Congress of Nationalities for a Federal Iran (2005–present); National Council of Resistance of Iran (1981–1985); United Front of Progressive Parties (1946–1948)
- International affiliation: Socialist International; Progressive Alliance; Unrepresented Nations and Peoples Organization

Party flag
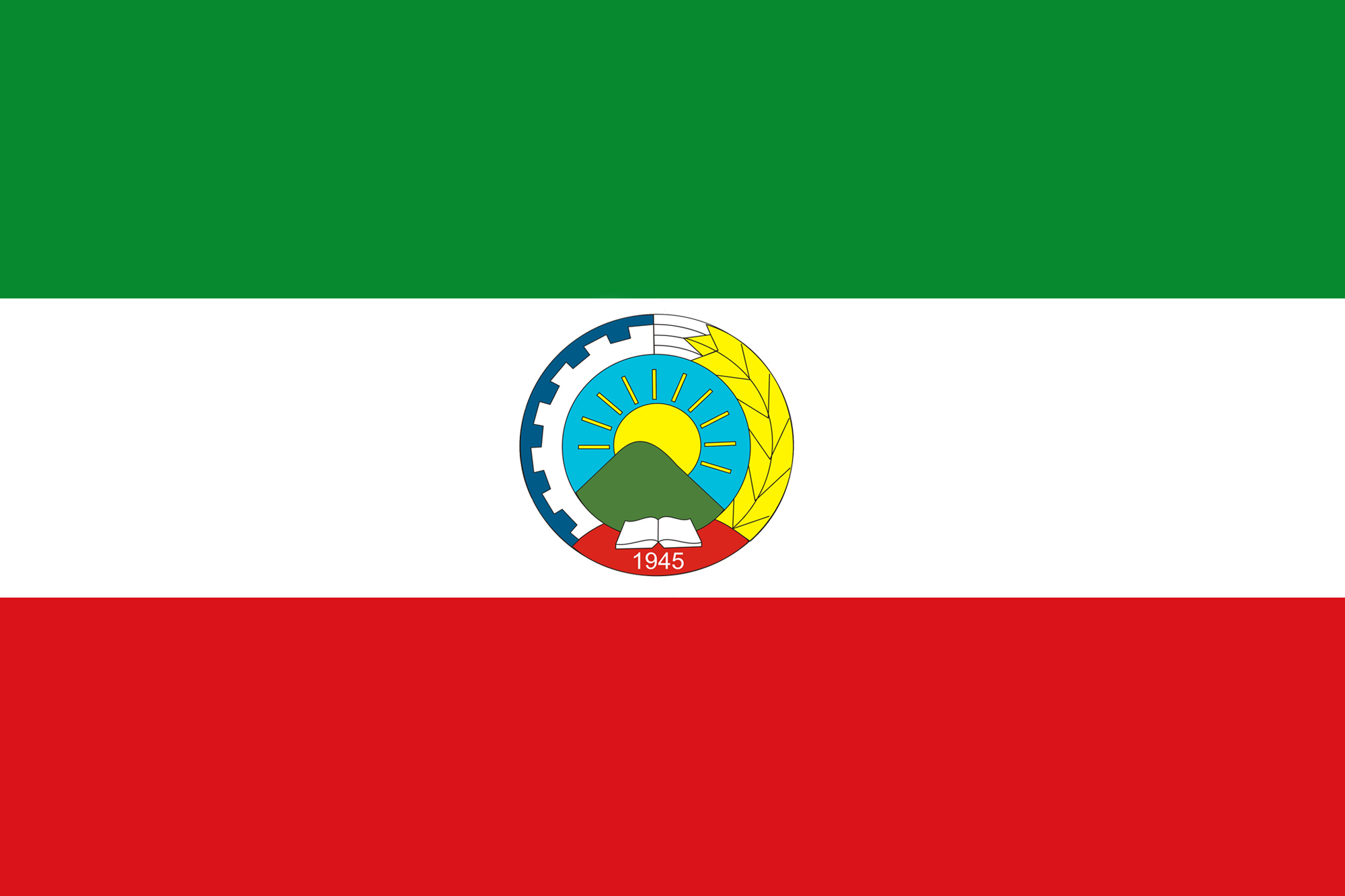

Website
- pdki.org

Military Wing: PDKI Peshmerga
- Leader: Qazi Muhammad (1940s)
- Dates active: 1945–1946; 1966–1967; 1977–1978; 1979–1996; 2016–present
- Active regions: Kurdistan Region; Kurdistan Province and West Azerbaijan Provinces of Iran
- Size: 12,750 infantry and cavalry (1946 estimate); 10,000–25,000 (1979–1983 estimate); 7,000–10,000 regulars plus 14,000–20,000 part-time guerillas (1980 estimate); 12,000 Peshmergas along with 60,000 armed peasants (1982 estimate); 1,500 (1996 estimate); 1,200–1,800 (2008 estimate)

The Democratic Party of Iranian Kurdistan (PDKI; Kurdish: حیزبی دێموکراتی کوردستانی ئێران, romanized: Hizbi Dêmukrati Kurdıstani Êran, HDKA; Persian: حزب دموکرات کردستان ایران, romanized: Ḥezb-e Demokrāt-e Kordestān-e Īrān), also known as the Kurdish Democratic Party of Iran (KDPI), is a militant leftist Kurdish party in Iran.

The PDKI operates as an armed group and is based in the Kurdistan Region of Iraq, with political branch offices in Europe. It is the oldest Kurdish political party advocating self-determination for Kurdish people in Iran. It is banned and declared a terrorist organization by Iran and thus not able to operate openly in the country. Over the years, the group has shifted its focus from seeking an independent Kurdish nation-state to advocating autonomy or the implementation of a federal system in Iran, and it espouses democratic socialism.

Since the 20th century, PDKI has waged a persistent guerrilla war against Iran as part of the Kurdish separatist movement in Iran. This included the 1967 Kurdish revolt in Iran, 1979–1989 Kurdish insurgency, the 1989–1996 insurgency, and recent clashes in 2016.

In recent years, the PDKI has played a significant role in supporting widespread protests against the Iranian regime. The party, alongside other Kurdish opposition groups, has called for regime change and the establishment of a democratic government that guarantees freedom and rights for all citizens. Despite harsh government crackdowns on demonstrators, the PDKI has organized solidarity actions such as strikes and public protests within Kurdistan Province. During the protests, the party joined other Kurdish groups to form the Coalition of Political Forces of Iranian Kurdistan.

== History ==
=== Early years ===
On 16 August 1945, Qazi Muhammad founded the party under the name Kurdistan Democratic Party (PDK) in Mahabad, Iran. The organization emerged partly as a response to discriminatory state policies toward non-Persian and non-Shiʿite communities in Iran. The party replaced the Society for Kurdish Resurrection (Kurdish: Komalay Ziyanaway Kurd), which had been founded a few years earlier by some of the future founding members of the PDK.

On 22 January 1946, the Republic of Kurdistan would be declared, of which Muhammad formally became president. The republic lasted less than a year before the USSR's occupation of Iran ended and the Imperial Iranian Army under Mohammad Reza Pahlavi conquered the short-lived Kurdish state on 15 December 1946. After the fall of the republic, many PDK members were arrested and executed by the Iranian Government, including Muhammad, nearly ending the party. The KDPI has been a central actor in the Iranian Kurdish national movement since 1947, particularly after the collapse of the Republic of Kurdistan.

=== After Qazi Muhammad's death ===
After the collapse and death of leader Qazi Muhammad the party experienced a long and difficult recovery process.

The collapse led to the PDK becoming reliant on the Tudeh Party, until the party saw a short revival under the anti-Shah administration of Mohammad Mosaddegh (1951–53), but was again weakened when Shah Mohammad Reza Pahlavi took over the country in the 1953 Iranian coup d'état.

The party's first conference after the fall of the Republic of Kurdistan was held in 1955 and was a key step towards restoring its independence and popular support. The conference insisted on the independence of the party from other organizations, effectively ending relations with the Tudeh. Jalil Gadani, a long-time party member recalls that, during the conference, the word "Iran" was added, leading to the party being renamed the PDKI.

In 1958, the PDKI was on the verge of unifying with the Iraqi Kurdistan Democratic Party (KDP), but failed after it was stopped by the SAVAK secret police. The remnants of the PDKI continued to support the KDP until the Shah began aiding the KDP in its fight against the Iraqi government, which had previously overthrown the Hashemite dynasty. In return for the Shah's aid, the KDP decreased its cooperation with the PDKI.

Later the PDKI reorganised itself, marginalising its pro-KDP leader Abdullah Ishaqi, letting new communist and nationalist members join, and forming the Revolutionary Committee to continue the fight against the Iranian government. The Committee began an unsuccessful revolt in March 1967, which ended after 18 months of fighting and forced the party to retreat into exile in Iraqi Kurdistan.

After reforms by charismatic leader, Abdulrahman Ghassemlou, the PDKI renewed its struggle and fought alongside Islamist and Marxist movements against the Shah, culminating in the Iranian Revolution of 1979.

=== During the Islamic Republic of Iran ===
Khomeini's new Islamic Republic, however, refused the PDKI demands for human rights and further oppressed the PDKI and other Kurdish parties, even going so far as to proclaim a ‘holy war’ against the Kurds of Iran. This resulted in the deaths of over 10,000 Kurds. The PDKI continued its activities mainly in exile, hoping to achieve Kurdish national rights within a "Democratic Federal Republic of Iran."

In 1981, during the Iran–Iraq War, Ba'athist Iraq supported the party in the Eastern Kurdish cities of Nowdesheh and Qasr-e Shirin by providing weapons. With that, the Iraqi government under Saddam Hussein, hoped to instrumentalize the party against the Iranians. The PKDI hopes were to establish an autonomous Kurdish entity in Iran. However, the Iranian forces staged a series of debilitating attacks against the KDPI, leaving them a "marginal military factor during much of the Iran–Iraq War."

==== Vienna assassination ====
On 13 July 1989, the then PDKI leader Abdulrahman Ghassemlou arrived in Vienna with his delegation to have talks with Iranian diplomats regarding the terms of reconciliation between the central government in Tehran and the Kurds. Those were not the only talks planned with Iran held in Vienna. After they entered the conference hall and the talks started, the Iranian "diplomats" took out automatic firearms and murdered all of the members of the Kurdish delegation, including Ghassemlou.

==== Mykonos restaurant assassinations ====
Sadeq Sharafkandi's murder became an international incident between Germany and Iran. On 17 September 1992, PDKI leaders Sadeq Sharafkandi, Fettah Abduli, Humayûn Erdelan and their translator Nûri Dêkurdi were assassinated at the Mykonos Greek restaurant in Berlin, Germany. In the Mykonos trial, the courts found Kazem Darabi, an Iranian national who worked as a grocer in Berlin, and Lebanese Abbas Rhayel, guilty of murder and sentenced them to life in prison. Two other Lebanese, Youssef Amin and Mohamed Atris, were convicted of being accessories to murder. In its 10 April 1997 ruling, the court issued an international arrest warrant for Iranian intelligence minister Hojjat al-Islam Ali Fallahian after declaring that the assassination had been ordered by him with knowledge of Ayatollah Ali Khamenei and President Ayatollah Rafsanjani.

==== 1996 unilateral ceasefire ====
In 1996, the PDKI had to declare a unilateral ceasefire, after being hard hit by relentless Iranian attacks.

=== Modern era ===
In 1997, the party's call for abstaining the presidential election remained largely ignored by Kurdish citizens in Iran and amid a high turnout in Kurdistan Province, a large number voted for Mohammad Khatami.

==== 2006 party split ====
From 1996-2004, Abdullah Hassanzadeh was the secretary-general for the PDKI. In 2004 Mustafa Hijri took charge. During Hijri's time as the secretary-general several members all over the world and in Iraqi Kurdistan expressed their dissatisfaction with his work. In the 13th congress in November 2006 party members told Hijri to back down from his position, but he rejected, which ultimately led to led to weeks of intra-party negotiations aimed at avoiding a split and reaching a compromise with him. Hijri rejected all offers and on 1 December 2006 the Kurdistan Democratic Party (HDK) was founded after it split from the Hijri's PDKI.

PDKI TV Channel

Shortly after the party split the PDKI was fast to establish their own TV Channel called TISHK TV while HDK some months later established Kurd Channel. But during the reunification between the two sides in August 2022 the PDKI changed their TV Channel as a part of the reunification to Kurd Channel.

==== 2016 renewing of the armed struggle ====
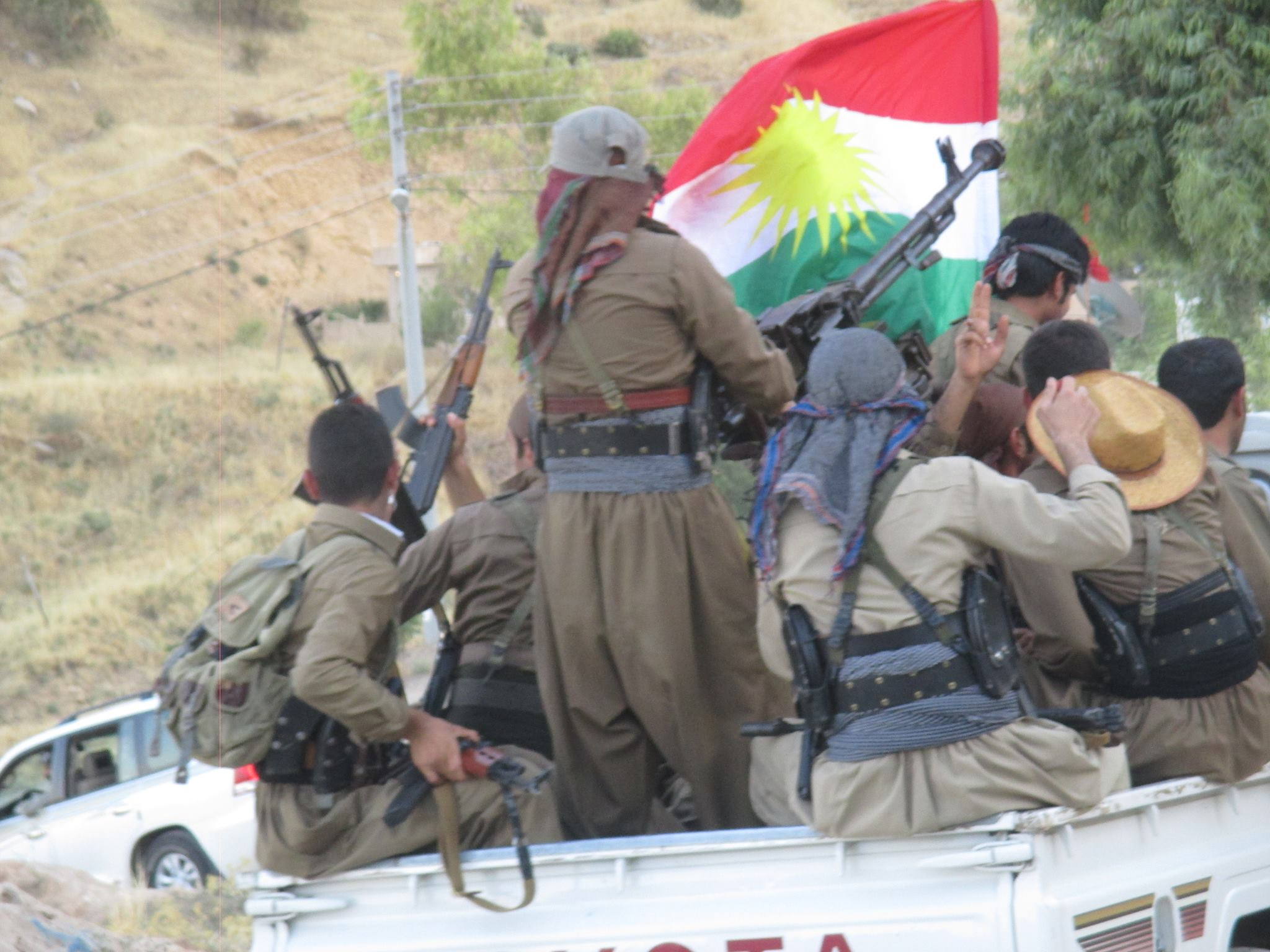
PDKI Peshmerga in 2014.

In 2016, the organization announced it was reviving its armed struggle following the death of Farinaz Khosravani and subsequent Mahabad riots. The Kurdistan Freedom Party and Komala declared their support for the announcement - which led to the Western Iran Clashes in 2016. In wake of the clashes, secretary-general Hijri, called Iran a 'Shia ISIS'.

In the same year an Iranian agent planted a bomb near the party's headquarter, the Democrat Castle, which led to the deaths of 6 HDK and KDPI members.

==== 2018 missile attack on the party's headquarter ====
On 8 September 2018 the Islamic Revolutionary Guard Corps Aerospace Force launched seven Fateh-110 missiles at the party's headquarters, the Democrat Castle in Koya, Kurdistan Region, Iraq while a HDK meeting was underway. The missiles got a direct hit on where the meeting was taking place at the Democrat Castle killing a total of 18 HDK and KDPI members. 50 HDK/KDPI members were injured, including HDK leaders Xalıd Ezizi and Mustafa Mewlûdi. And all the HDK members that were killed was, Mohammed Hassanpour, Nasrin Hedad, Rahman Piroti, Sohila Qaderi, Braim Zewei, Karim Mahdavi, Hasim Azizi, Osman Osmani, Kak Karsaz, Karim Rasoulzadeh, Peshawar Sayed Umaz, Jamal Akbari and Mansour Akbarpour.

==== 2022 attack on Koya ====
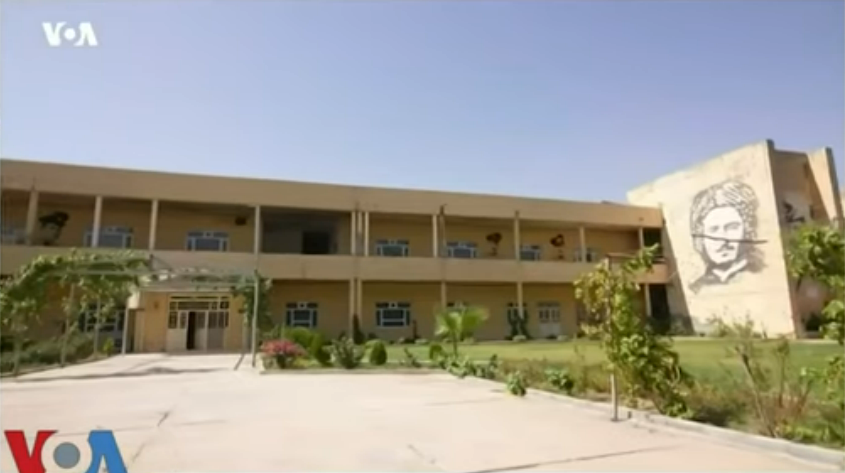
The party's headquarters, the Democrat Castle, in Koy Sanjaq, Kurdistan Region, Iraq, 2022. On the right side of the building, there is a mural of party founder and legendary leader Qazi Muhammad.

In 2022, the IRGC and the Islamic Revolutionary Guard Corps launched ballistic missiles and several Shahed drones which attacked a school at Azadi Settlement in the Kurdistan Region. The ballistic missiles nearly hit close to a school, which led to the killing of 17 teachers and parents, and 1 child. After the attacks on the school Iran attacked the headquarters of the Komala Parties in Zrgwez, Sulaymaniyah Governorate. Similar attacks continued the following days and casualties had increased to 18 deaths and 62 injuries, as of October 4, 2022. On November 14, Iranian airstrikes on Koya and the PDKI's party headquarters continued, killing at least two people and injuring 10 other KDPI members. As a result of the attacks 72 civilians and KDPI members were injured and 37 civilians and KDPI members were killed. Further Iranian missile strikes on 21 November 2022 destroyed more houses in Koy Sanjaq.

==== Reunification ====
Both groups, the PDKI and HDK, reunited on August 21, 2022 and resumed their political and military activities under the name of the PDKI.

==== New leading team ====
The party's leadership is the Executive Board. The board consists of 12 members and is being led by Mustafa Hijri.

==== 2026 Kurdish–Iranian crisis ====
The PDKI expressed support for the nationwide protests that erupted in Iran in late 2025. The protests, which initially focused on economic grievances, later expanded to include broader opposition to the Islamic Republic’s leadership. The PDKI stated its solidarity with the protest movement and condemned the government’s response. According to statements published on the party’s official website, the PDKI also called for international protection for demonstrators, particularly in Iran’s Kurdish regions, citing reports of lethal force used by security forces. The PDKI participated in a joint meeting with other Iranian Kurdish political parties to discuss the ongoing protests and the broader political situation in Iran and the Kurdistan region. During the meeting, Kurdish opposition groups reiterated their support for the protest movement and emphasized the importance of political coordination and cooperation in response to the crisis. On January 11, PDKI representative Amir Babakhani called for the fall of Iran's regime in favor of a free and democratic country, and the party welcomed international condemnations of the crackdown on protests.

On 22 February 2026, following the protests, the PDKI joined other Iranian Kurdish parties in creating the Coalition of Political Forces of Iranian Kurdistan. On 3 March 2026, United States President Donald Trump spoke to KDPI Secretary-General Mustafa Hijri, in an attempt to instigate a U.S.– and Peshmerga–backed ground offensive in western Iran by Iranian Kurdish opposition forces amid the 2026 Iran war.

== Military wing ==
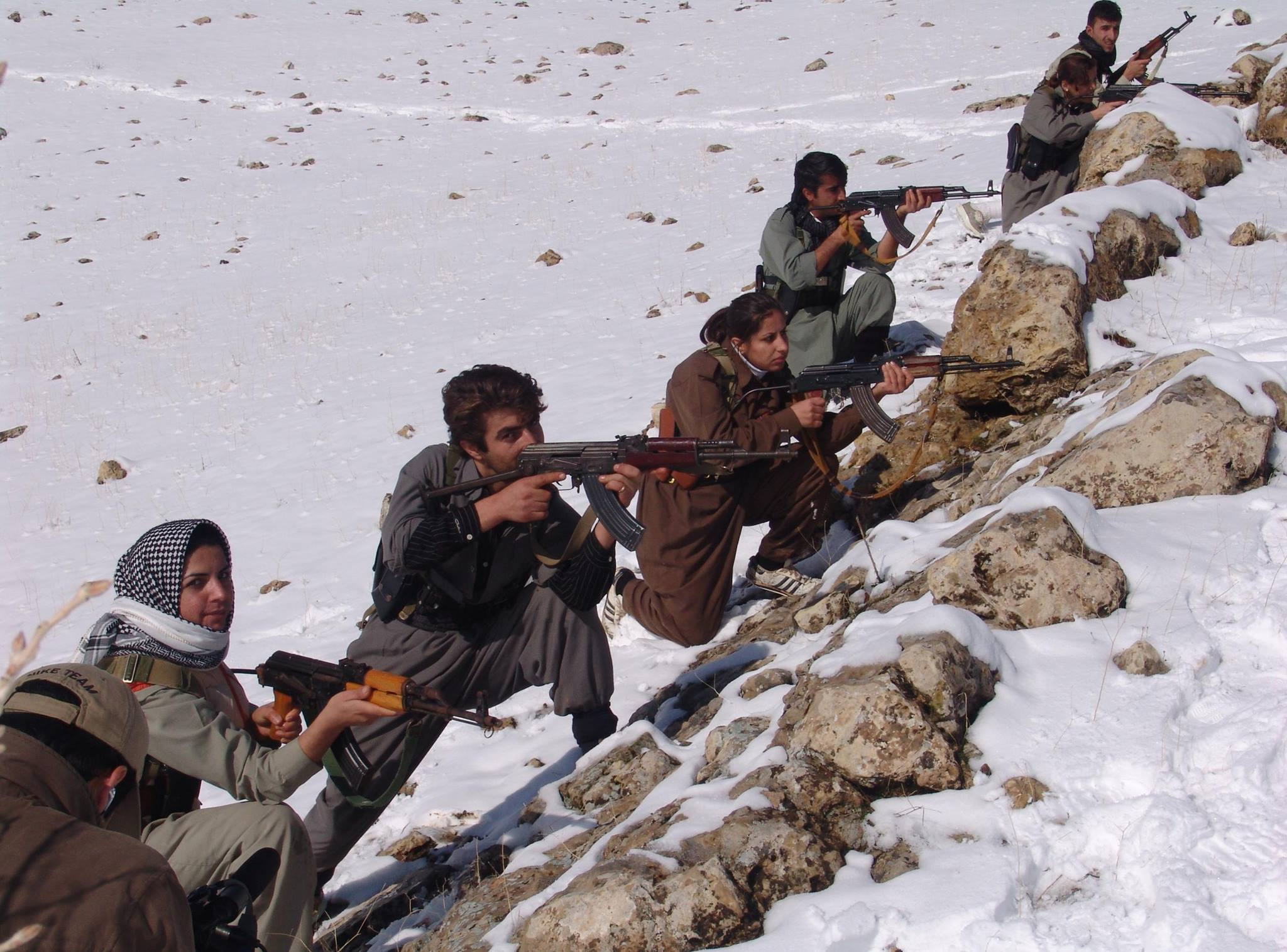
PDKI Peshmerga in 2013

The military wing of the PDKI are called Peshmerga, like the Peshmerga of the Kurdistan Region, or PDKI Peshmerga. Hyeran Jo of Texas A&M University classifies the KDPI fighters as "compliant rebels", i.e. rebels that kill fewer than 100 people and refrain from killing for more than half of their operating years.

=== Ethics ===
According to Jo, in order to gain domestic and international legitimacy, the KDPI denounces violence against civilians, claiming commitment to the Universal Declaration of Human Rights and Geneva Convention Article 3, and as of 2007 is one of the signatories to the Geneva Call's ban on anti-personnel mines.

== PDKI congresses ==
The PDKI has held eighteen congresses. These occurred in 1945, 1964, 1971, 1980, 1982, 1984, 1985, 1988, 1992, 1995, 1997, 2000, 2004, 2008, 2012, 2018, 2022 (reunification) and 2025.

During the 20th Congress of the Socialist International, held at the headquarters of the United Nations in New York City (9–11 September 1996), the PDKI was given the status of observer member. In 2005, the PDKI's membership was elevated to consultative member status.

== PDKI Headquarters over the years ==
PDKI has had a lot of different headquarters including in both Iranian Kurdistan and Iraqi Kurdistan, here is a list of all the Headquarters that PDKI has had over the years:

- Mahabad (1945 - 1968)
- Qandil Mountains (1968 - mid 1993)
- Democrat Castle (1993 - 2023)
- Koy Sinjaq (1993–present)

== Secretaries-General ==
- Qazi Muhammad (1945–1947)
- Ahmed Tewfiq (1947–1964)
- Vacant (1964-1971)
- Abdul Rahman Ghassemlou (1971–1989)
- Sadegh Sharafkandi (1989–1992)
- Mustafa Hijri (1992–1994)
- Abdullah Hassanzadeh (1994–2004)
- Mustafa Hijri (2004–)
