= Sadegh Sharafkandi =

Kurdish political activist and the Secretary-General of the PDKI

- سادق شەڕەفکەندی
- Born: 11 January 1938; Bukan, West Azerbaijan Province, Imperial State of Iran
- Died: 17 September 1992 (aged 54); Berlin, Germany
- Cause of death: Assassination
- Resting place: Père Lachaise Cemetery, Paris, France
- Citizenship: Iran
- Education: Ph.D. in Analytical Chemistry
- Alma mater: University of Paris VI
- Title: Secretary-General of the Democratic Party of Iranian Kurdistan (PDKI)
- Term: 1989–1992
- Predecessor: Abdul Rahman Ghassemlou
- Successor: Vacant, later Mustafa Hijri
- Political party: Democratic Party of Iranian Kurdistan (PDKI)
- Children: 3
- Relatives: Hejar brother

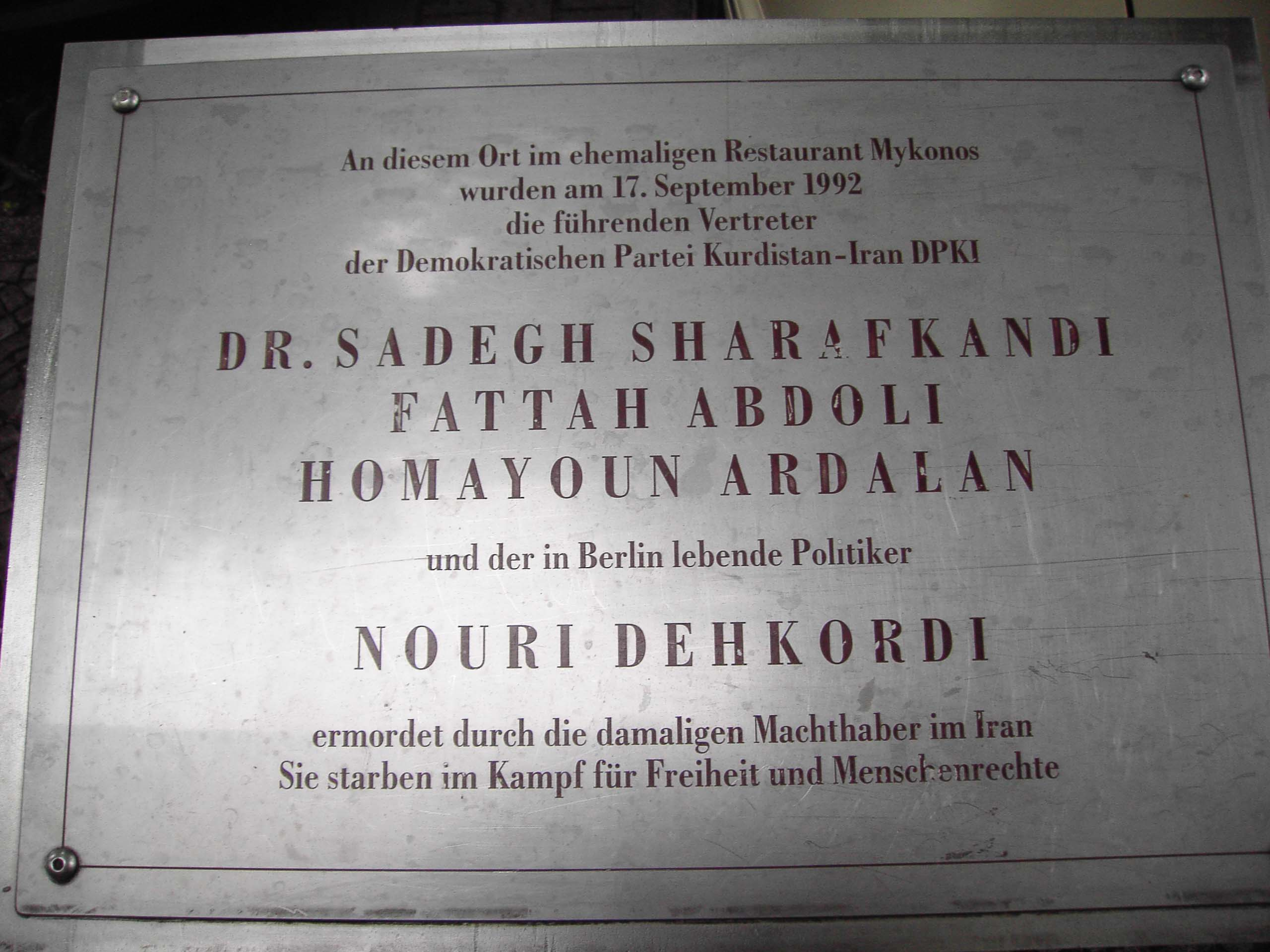
those who were killed with Sharafkandi from top 1- Dr. Sadegh Sharafkandi 2- Fattah Abdoli 3- Homayoun Ardalan 4- Nouri Dehbokri

Sadegh Sharafkandi (Sorani Kurdish: سادق شەڕەفکەندی, Kurdish: Sadiq Şerefkendî; 11 January 1938 – 17 September 1992) was a Kurdish political activist and the Secretary-General of the Kurdistan Democratic Party of Iran (PDKI). He was killed in the Mykonos restaurant assassinations in Berlin in September 1992.

== Early life and education ==
Sharafkandi was born on 1 January 1938, in Bukan, West Azerbaijan, Iran. He spent two years of his elementary studies in his native village, then his family moved to Mahabad, where he completed his primary and secondary education. In 1959, he received his degree in chemistry at the Institute of Higher Education in Tehran.

== Career ==
After graduation, up to 1965, Sharafkandi taught chemistry in the Kurdish towns of Bukan and Mahabad. Because of his political activities, he was transferred first to Arak, then to Karaj by the Shah's regime, before being appointed assistant lecturer in chemistry at the Teachers’ Higher Training College in Tehran. In 1972, he went to France to study at the University of Paris VI, where he received his Ph.D. in analytical chemistry in 1976. While studying in Paris in 1973, he met Dr. Abdul Rahman Ghassemlou, the Secretary-general of the Democratic Party of Iranian Kurdistan (PDKI), and joined the party. Upon his return to Iran, he became Ghassemlou's representative in his country. In 1976, he went back to Iran to teach at the Teachers’ Higher Training College in Tehran. After the fall of the Shah's regime in February 1979, he resigned from his position and joined the reawakening Kurdish movement, which in August became the target of a “Holy War” decreed by Ayatollah Khomeini.

In February 1979, after the fall of the Shah's regime, the PDKI's activities became illegal. Dr. Sharafkandi was elected alternate member of the Central Committee and appointed as the Party's official in Tehran. During the summer of 1979, he became a permanent Party cadre and in 1980, during the following Congress, he acceded to the Political Bureau. From then onwards, up to the assassination in July 1989 in Vienna of Dr. Ghassemlou by Iranian emissaries, he was regularly re-elected and put in charge of the Party's publications. In 1986, he also took office as assistant Secretary-general of PDKI. After Ghassemlou's assassination, he temporarily took over the Party's leadership until December 1991, when he was unanimously elected Secretary-general during the IXth Congress.

== Death ==
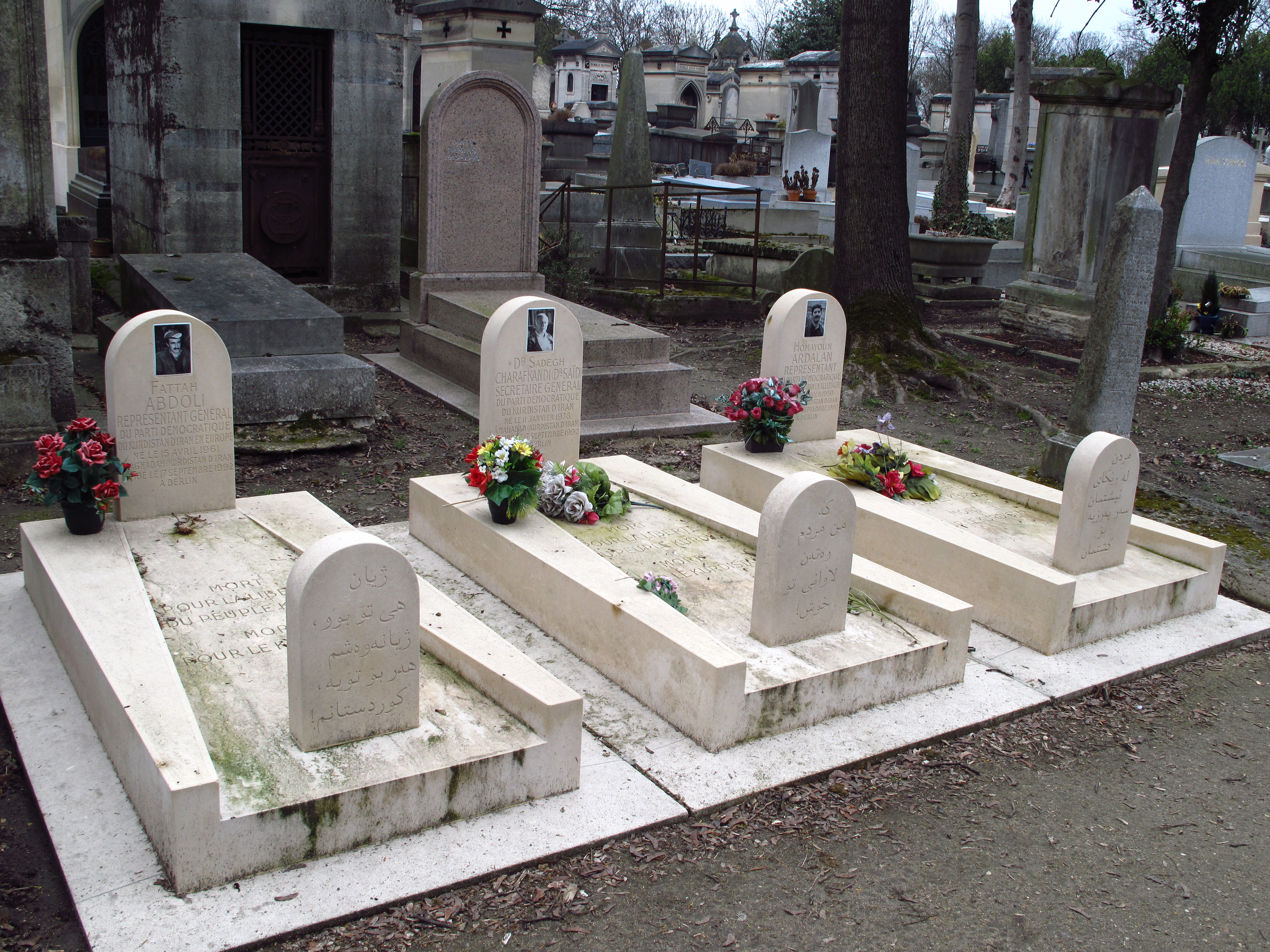
Graves of Fattah Abdoli, Sadegh Charafkandi and Homayoun Ardalan, three victims of the Mykonos assassination attempt, in the Père Lachaise Cemetery (Paris).

Sharafkandi was murdered in the Mykonos restaurant assassinations. On 17 September 1992, Iranian-Kurdish insurgent leaders Sadegh Sharafkandi, Fattah Abdoli, Homayoun Ardalan and their translator Nouri Dehkordi were assassinated at the Mykonos Greek restaurant in Berlin, Germany. In the Mykonos trial, the courts found Kazem Darabi, an Iranian national who worked as a grocer in Berlin, and Lebanese Abbas Rhayel, guilty of murder and sentenced them to life in prison. Two other Lebanese, Youssef Amin and Mohamed Atris, were convicted of being accessories to murder. In its 10 April 1997 ruling, the court issued an international arrest warrant for Iranian intelligence minister Hojjat al-Islam Ali Fallahian after declaring that the assassination had been ordered by him with knowledge of supreme leader Grand Ayatollah Ali Khamenei and president Ayatollah Rafsanjani.

In a 2004 letter to Berlin mayor Klaus Wowereit, Mahmoud Ahmadinejad (the mayor of Tehran at that time) objected to the commemorative plaque in front of the restaurant, calling it an insult to Iran.

According to multiple sources Hezbollah was directly involved in the assassination of Sadegh Sharafkandi.

== Personal life ==
Sharafkandi was married and had three children. Aside from Kurdish, he spoke Persian, Arabic, Azeri and French.

He was also the younger brother of the renowned Kurdish historian and poet Abdurrahman Sharafkandi (Hejar).

Party political offices
Preceded by Abdul Rahman Ghassemlou	Secretary-General of the Democratic Party of Iranian Kurdistan; 1989–1992	Succeeded by Mustafa Hijri
