= Mykonos restaurant assassinations =

1992 assassinations of Iranian-Kurdish opposition leaders in Berlin, Germany

Coordinates: 52°29′41″N 13°20′03″E

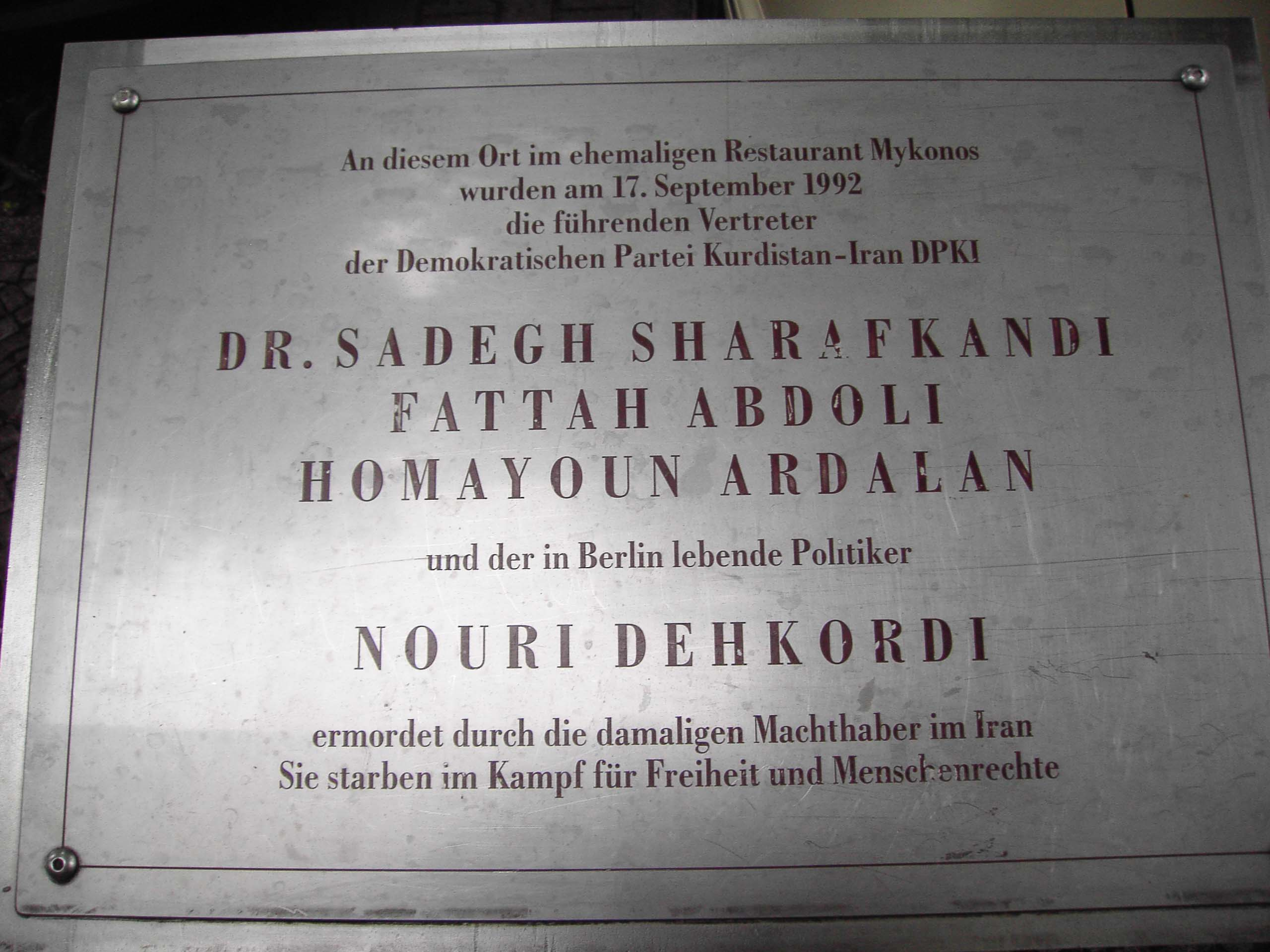
The names of the four victims on a commemorative plaque

In the Mykonos restaurant assassinations (Persian: ترور رستوران میکونوس, Sorani Kurdish: تێرۆری میکۆنۆس; also the "Mykonos Incident"), Iranian-Kurdish opposition leaders Sadegh Sharafkandi, Fattah Abdoli, Homayoun Ardalan and their translator Nouri Dehkordi, were assassinated at the Mykonos Greek restaurant in Berlin, Germany on 17 September 1992. The assassination took place during the KDPI insurgency (1989–96), as part of the general Kurdish separatism in Iran. The assassins were believed by German courts to have links to Iranian intelligence. Kazem Darabi, an Iranian intelligence service employee, was tried and sentenced to life imprisonment by the Berlin Supreme Court.

== Events ==
Sharafkandi, Abdoli, Ardalan and Dehkordi were murdered in a mafia-style attack at the Mykonos Greek restaurant located on Prager Straße in Berlin at about 11 pm on 17 September 1992. Three victims died instantly, while the fourth died at a hospital. In the same restaurant a meeting was scheduled of Ingvar Carlsson, a two-term Prime Minister of Sweden and leader of the Swedish Social Democratic Party, Mona Sahlin, the secretary of the Swedish Social Democratic Party and Pierre Schori, the former Swedish State Secretary for Foreign Affairs. Due to a telephone call to Ingvar Carlsson from Carl Bildt, the then-current Prime Minister of Sweden, who urged Carlsson to immediately return to Sweden due to the alleged urgent state of the Swedish economy, all three flew back to Sweden the same day and thus probably escaped being assassinated as well.

Sharafkandi, Abdoli and Ardalan were buried in the Père Lachaise Cemetery, in Paris.

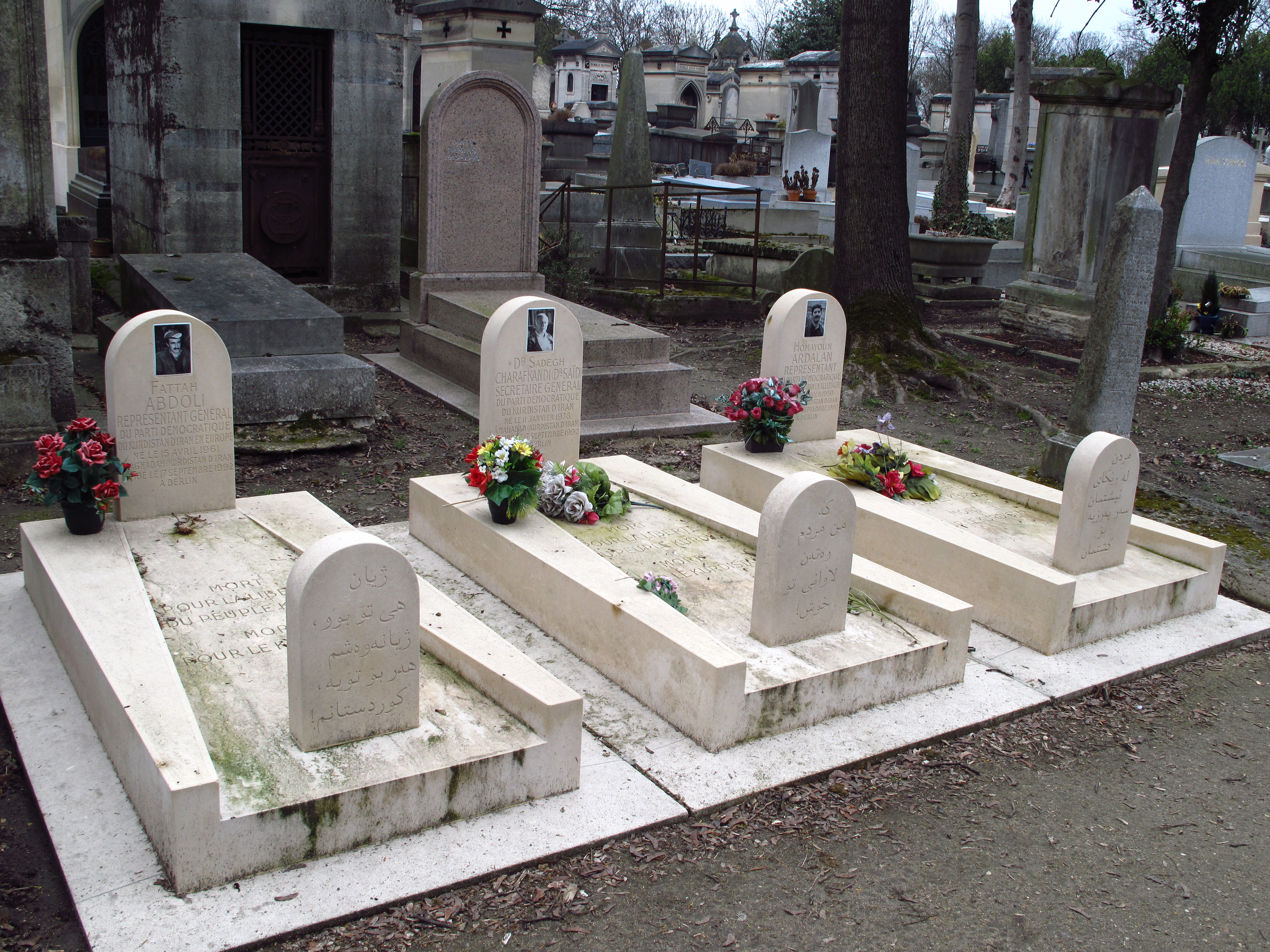
Graves of Abdoli, Sharafkandi and Ardalan, in Paris.

== Trial ==
In the trial that began in October 1993, the German court found four suspects guilty of murder. These were Kazem Darabi, an Iranian who worked as a grocer in Berlin, Abdolraham Banihashemi, an Iranian intelligence officer, and Lebanese Abbas Hossein Rhayel. All four were sentenced to life in prison. Two other Lebanese, Youssef Amin and Mohamed Atris, were convicted of being accessories to murder. A dissident ex-President of Iran Abolhassan Banisadr, who fled the country in 1981 after being impeached and has not returned since, testified as a witness during the trial and told the court that the killings had been personally ordered by Ayatollah Ali Khamenei and then-president Ali Akbar Hashemi Rafsanjani. There was also a getaway driver named Farajollah Haider (also known as Abu Ja'far).

In its 10 April 1997 ruling, the court issued an international arrest warrant for Iranian intelligence minister Ali Fallahian after declaring that the assassination had been ordered by him with knowledge of Khamenei and Rafsanjani. This led to a diplomatic crisis between the government of Iran and those of several European countries lasting until November 1997. Despite international and domestic protests, Darabi and Rhayel were released from prison on 10 December 2007 and deported back to their home countries.

== Adaptations in media ==
The events surrounding the Mykonos restaurant assassinations and subsequent trial were adapted into a non-fiction story by Roya Hakakian in her book Assassins of the Turquoise Palace in 2011.

The Mykonos restaurant assassinations (alongside the 1994 AMIA bombing) are attributed to Majid Javadi in the first episode of the third season of the 2011 American TV show Homeland.

== See also ==
- Germany–Iran relations
- Iran and state-sponsored terrorism
- Chain murders of Iran
- Kurdistan Democratic Party of Iran
