= February 1999 Kurdish protests =

Protests in Turkey

February 15, 1999 Kurdish protests
- Part of Serhildan (of the Kurdish–Turkish conflict) and Kurdish separatism in Iran
- Date: February 15–18, 1999
- Location: Turkey: Ankara, Diyarbakır, Istanbul Armenia: Yerevan; Australia: Sydney; Austria: Vienna; Belgium: Brussels; Canada: Montreal, Ottawa, Vancouver; Denmark: Copenhagen; France: Paris, Marseille, Strasbourg; Germany: Berlin, Bonn, Düsseldorf, Hamburg, Stuttgart; Greece: Athens; Iran: Sanandaj, Kermanshah, Mahabad, Urmia, Tehran; Italy: Milan; Netherlands: The Hague; Russia: Moscow; Sweden: Stockholm; Switzerland: Bern, Geneva, Zurich; United Kingdom: London United States: New York City, Washington, D.C.
- Caused by: Capture of Abdullah Öcalan
- Goals: Release of Abdullah Öcalan
- Methods: Riots; Civil resistance; Demonstrations; General strikes; Self-immolations; Spontaneous uprisings

Parties
Kurdish protesters DEHAP; PKK Other Kurdish groups	Turkey: Turkish Military; Turkish Police; Village Guards; Anti-PKK protesters; (Canada) Canadian Police (Germany) German Police (United Kingdom) UK Police (United States) US Police

Lead figures
DEHAP: Mehmet Abbasoğlu; Tuncer Bakırhan; Aysel Tuğluk; PKK: Cemil Bayık; Osman Öcalan; Murat Karayılan	Turkey: Süleyman Demirel; Bülent Ecevit; Devlet Bahçeli

Number
Turkey: Thousands Canada: Montreal: 40; Ottawa: 300; Vancouver: 60 Belgium: Brussels:50 Germany: Berlin: 200 Düsseldorf: 300 Frankfurt: 50 Greece: Athens: 10,000 Italy: Milan: 20 Netherlands: The Hague: 150 Switzerland: Geneva: 30-40 United Kingdom: London: 3,000	

Casualties and losses
1 dead and 1 injured (Turkey); 1,000 arrested (Turkey); 3 arrested (Canada); 1 injured (Denmark); 20+ arrested (France); 3 killed (Germany); 17 injured (Germany); 57 arrested (Germany); 350 detained (Greece); 49 detained (Russia); 1 injured (UK); 3 killed (Iran) Total: 7 dead, 20+ injured, ~1,500 detained/arrested	5 diplomats taken hostage (Austria); 9 police injured (Canada); 1 politician taken hostage (Germany); 1 diplomat taken hostage (Italy) 1 diplomat, 1 policeman taken hostage (Switzerland)

The February 1999 Kurdish protests were held by Kurds in Turkey, Iran and by the Kurdish diaspora worldwide, after Kurdistan Workers' Party leader Abdullah Öcalan had been captured at the Nairobi airport in Kenya, after having left the Greek embassy, and was brought to Turkey to stand trial for terrorism promoting separatism and treason.

In response to Öcalan's capture, Kurds staged protests in over 20 European cities, as well as in Canada and Australia, attacking Greek, Kenyan and Turkish diplomatic missions worldwide. The Israeli consulate in Berlin was also attacked, after Kurds alleged Israeli involvement in Öcalan's capture.

Since 1999, protests have been held by Kurds in Turkey, on February 15, every single year.

== Background ==
In October 1998 after diplomatic pressure and military threats, Abdullah Öcalan was forced to leave his safe haven in Syria, going to Moscow, Russia, where he was not allowed to stay. In November he flew to Rome, Italy. the Italian government did not want to allow Öcalan, however they were legally not permitted to extradite him to any country that imposed the death penalty. After being denied entrance to Germany, the Netherlands and France, Öcalan went to the Greek island of Corfu on February 1, 1999. He was flown to Nairobi, Kenya the next day.

He was captured in on February 15, 1999, while being transferred from the Greek embassy to Jomo Kenyata international airport Nairobi, in an operation by the Millî İstihbarat Teşkilâtı with debatable help of CIA or Mossad. The Greek consul who harboured him, George Costoulas, said that his life was in danger after the operation. A Kenyan minister was forced to resign for allowing Öcalan and his guards to enter the country.

== Protests ==
=== Turkey ===
In Turkey, violent protests broke out after the news of Öcalan's capture broke and troops were forced to fight protesters in many major cities.

In Istanbul, protesters used hit and run tactics to torch vehicles and a petrol bomb was hurled at a bus belonging to Turkish Prime Minister Bülent Ecevit's Democratic Left Party, as police rounded up hundreds of PKK supporters.

In total over 1,000 people were arrested and two prisoners set themselves on fire in Turkey, at least one of which died of his injuries.

=== Iran ===
A massive Kurdish riot took place in the Iranian city of Sanandaj, where a Kurdish majority resides. As a result, many were arrested and 3 Kurdish protesters were killed. The events prompted Kurdish activists to express their outrage on "Khatami's indifference".

=== Worldwide ===
- Armenia: Kurdish protesters stormed a UN building in the Armenian capital of Yerevan.
- Australia: Some 50 Kurdish protesters occupied the Greek consulate Sydney and ended their occupation after a 9-hour standoff with Australian police.
- Austria: Protesters occupied an office of the Social Democratic Party (SPÖ) in Vienna, they also occupied Greek and Kenyan embassies, taking five hostages. The stand-off ended on February 17 when the protesters voluntarily left the building after negotiations.
- Canada: On February 15, over 60 Kurdish protesters stormed the Greek consulate in Vancouver, and 30 remained to occupy the building, spreading flammable liquid and threatening to burn themselves. They, however, left peacefully after several hours. Some 40 Kurdish protesters stormed the National Bank of Greece in Montreal smashing computers and furniture. On February 16, 300 protesters attacked the Turkish embassy in Ottawa, hurling rocks and ice at the building, smashing several windows. 9 Canadian policemen were hurt during the riot. Police eventually managed to drive the protesters back with pepper spray and arrested three people.
- Denmark: In Copenhagen a group of protesters stormed the premises of the European Commission. A woman was seriously injured after setting herself on fire.
- France: In Paris, protesters stormed the Kenyan Embassy, taking several hostages, another 20 were arrested trying to storm the Greek embassy. Several people were injured when police evicted 30 demonstrators who were occupying the Greek consulate in Strasbourg. Several dozen protesters were also forced out of the Greek consulate in Marseille.
- Germany: On February 17 200 Kurdish protesters armed with iron bars stormed the Israeli consulate in Berlin, accusing the Mossad of helping the Turkish government in kidnapping Öcalan, allegations which were strongly denied by Israeli Prime Minister Benjamin Netanyahu. After the protesters managed to break through police ranks and enter the building, Israel Defense Forces opened fire on the protesters killing three and injuring 14. Netanyahu defended the actions, claiming that protesters attempted to take a weapon from one of the security forces. Furthermore, German police attributed attacks which damaged two Turkish cultural centers, a restaurant and a mosque, on Kurdish protesters. In Hamburg, PKK supporters seized a member of the ruling Social Democratic Party (SPD), he was later released. The Kenyan embassy in Bonn was also attacked. In Frankfurt rioters overturned cars and clashed with police with deployed water cannons and batons and some 50 protesters occupied a Greek consulate on February 17. In Düsseldorf 300 protesters occupied a Greek consulate and 30 were arrested. In Stuttgart police stormed the Greek embassy, arresting 27 protesters, while a 17-year-old Kurdish girl set herself on fire in protest and had to be taken to a hospital.
- Greece: Fearing heavy protests, some 350 Kurds were placed in "preventative detention" in a disused army camp in Athens. In Athens, over 10,000 Greeks, sympathetic to the Kurdish cause protested against the government for allowing Öcalan to fall into the hands of Turkey. In response Greek Foreign Minister Theodoros Pangalos, Public Order Minister Filippos Petsalnikos and Interior Minister Alekos Papadopoulos were forced to resign.
- Italy: 20 Kurds occupied the Greek consulate in Milan, taking the consul hostage for hours.
- Netherlands: In The Hague, 150 Kurdish protesters stormed the Greek ambassador's residence taking three hostages, including the ambassador's wife and 8-year-old son. They occupied the building for several hours before releasing the hostages.
- Russia: in Moscow 49 Kurds were arrested after occupying the Greek embassy for 2.5 hours. Russian Deputy Prime Minister Vadim Gustov condemned the occupation of the embassy but said the protesters were unlikely to be charged.
- Sweden: In Stockholm Kurdish protesters occupied a Social Democratic Party (S/SAP) office.
- Switzerland: On February 16, 30-40 protesters occupied the United Nations Office at Geneva. In Zurich and Bern, protesters attacked Greek diplomatic buildings, while in Zurich the protesters took the building's owner and a policeman who tried to negotiate with them hostage. On February 17, 20 protesters forced themselves into the United Nations High Commissioner for Refugees building in Geneva, minor damage was done to the building and all staff had to be evacuated.
- United Kingdom: In London 50 Kurdish protesters occupied the Greek embassy for three days while some 3,000 protesters laid siege on the embassy. A fifteen-year-old Kurdish girl set herself on fire to protest the arrest of Öcalan and was hospitalized.
- United States: Protests in the United States were limited compared to other countries. However, Kenyan, Greek and Turkish diplomats were given extra security in fear of violent protesters. Kenyan diplomatic missions in New York were shut during the protests
