= Abdul Rahman Ghassemlou =

Kurdish politician (1930–1989)

Member-elect of Assembly of Experts for Constitution
- In office Credentials rejected
- Constituency: West Azerbaijan province
- Majority: 113,773 (34.9%)

Personal details
- Born: 22 December 1930 Rezaiyeh (present-day Urmia), Imperial State of Persia (present-day Iran)
- Died: 13 July 1989 (aged 58) Vienna, Austria
- Cause of death: Assassination
- Resting place: Père Lachaise Cemetery, Paris, France
- Party: KDPI (1945–1989)
- Other political affiliations: NCRI (1981–1985)
- Spouse: Helen Kreulich
- Children: 2
- Education: Charles University in Prague; University of Sorbonne

Abdul Rahman Ghassemlou (Kurmanji Kurdish: عەبدورەحمان قاسملۆ, Ebdurehman Qasimlo; Sorani Kurdish: عەبدوڕەحمان قاسملوو, romanized: 'Ebdur̄eḧman Qasimlû; Persian: عبدالرحمان قاسملو; 22 December 1930 – 13 July 1989) was an Iranian Kurdish politician and leader. Ghassemlou was the Secretary-General of the Democratic Party of Iranian Kurdistan (KDPI) from 1971 until his assassination in 1989 by individuals suspected of being agents of the Islamic Republic of Iran.

== Early life and education ==
Born in Urmia, West Azerbaijan, Iran to a wealthy feudal family, his father, Mohammad Vesugh Ghassemlou (b. 1875), was a landowning Kurdish nationalist Agha and Khan from the Kurdish Shekak tribe. His mother was Nana Jan Timsar, a Christian Assyrian woman. His father was an adviser to the Shah of Iran, who gave him the title "Wussuq-e Divan." He completed his early education in Urmia and then in theran. He witnessed the era of the Republic of Mahabad and became a co-founder member of the youth wing of KDP-I at the age of 15. Ghassemlou moved to France to continue his studies at the Sorbonne. He met his wife Helen Krulich in Czechoslovakia. They had two daughters together, Mina (1953) and Hewa (1955). Ghassemlou had staunchly admired Simko Shikak, and even urged people to mention that he was born at the same time that Simko was killed.

Ghassemlou was fluent in 8 languages; Kurdish, Syriac-Aramaic, Persian, Arabic, Azerbaijani, French, English, Czech, and Russian. He was also familiar with German, Slovak, and Polish.

== Career ==
Ghassemlou went back to Kurdistan in 1952 after completing his studies. He then spent several years as an active militant in the Kurdish military fields. After Ghassemlou had built up a new central committee in Iraq in 1970, the PDKI officially contacted the Iraqi Ba'ath Party and then signed a mutual cooperation agreement. In 1973, during the Third Congress of the PDKI, he was elected the secretary general of the party, a position to which he was reelected several times until his assassination.

In 1979, his party supported the revolution which resulted in the ousting of Mohammad Reza Shah Pahlavi. Khomeini considered their last hour participation in the revolution as "opportunistic". Kurds belonging to the party had overtaken the military compounds in the Kurdish areas. Khomeini demanded all armed groups to become part of one revolutionary organization and requested that Kurdish soldiers "return" their weapons. Ghasemlou demanded autonomy for Kurds and refused to lay down weapons. The party boycotted the referendum for the new constitution. Following two bloody confrontation between Kurdish people and forces loyal to Khomeini, the Kurdish struggle turned into a war. Shortly after the beginning of the armed Kurdish rebellion, Ayatollah Khomeini and his prominent representative in West Azerbaijan province of Iran Gholamreza Hassani declared a "holy war" against the PDKI and Kurdish separatists. This was the start of confrontation of the party and the new state, which ended in a military defeat of the Kurdish rebels. In 1982 Ghassemlou, attempted to overthrow the Shia clerics in an alliance with the dismissed president of Iran Abolhassan Banisadr, but Banisadr declined to join his pro-Kurdish alliance due to ambitions for independence among the Kurds. The armed conflict continued up to 1984 in the middle of Iran–Iraq War (1980–1988) where both countries supported the armed rebels in each other's territory.

After the defeat of the armed rebellion, Ghassemlou settled in Paris and joined the National Council of Resistance of Iran that was founded by the PDKI and other opposition forces such as People's Mujahedin, the liberal-leftist National Democratic Front, the United Left of small socialist groupings, and the independent Islamist-leftist former president of Iran Abolhassan Bani Sadr in October 1981.

== Books ==
Ghassemlou wrote a book on the history of Kurds and their land titled "Kurdistan and Kurd". It was first published in 1964 in Slovak, 1965 in English, 1967 in Arabic, 1969 in Polish, and 1973 in Kurdish.

== Assassination and funerals ==
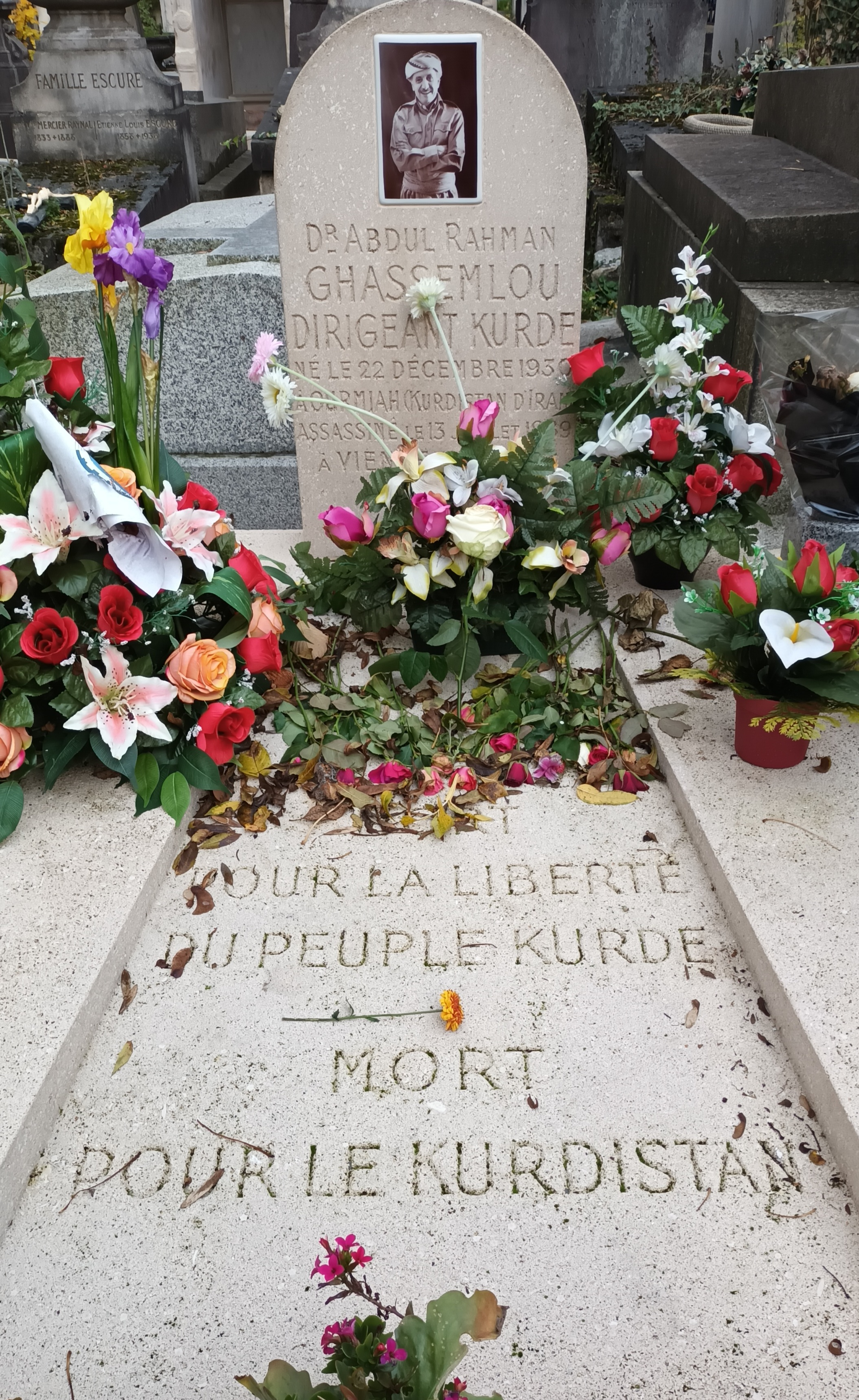
Tomb in Paris

In 1988, after the war had ended, the Iran government decided to meet with Ghassemlou. Several meetings followed in Vienna, on 28 December, 30 December and 20 January 1989. Another meeting was set up for 13 July, again in Vienna.

The Tehran delegation was as before, namely Mohammed Jafar Sahraroudi and Hadji Moustafawi, except that this time there was also a third member: Amir Mansur Bozorgian who was a bodyguard. The Kurds also had a three-man delegation: Abdul Rahman Ghassemlou, his aide Abdullah Ghaderi Azar (a member of the PDKI Central Committee) and Fadhil Rassoul, an Iraqi Kurdish university professor who had acted as a mediator.

The next day, 13 July 1989, Ghassemlou was killed by three bullets fired at very close range in the same room where the negotiation took place. His assistant Ghaderi Azar was hit by eleven bullets and Rassoul by five. Hadji Moustafawi succeeded in escaping. Mohammad Jafar Sahraroudi received minor injuries and was taken to a hospital, questioned and allowed to go. Amir Mansur Bozorgian was released after 24 hours in police custody and took refuge in the Iranian Embassy.

His deputy, Sadegh Sharafkandi, succeeded Ghassemlou as secretary-general until he was killed in the Mykonos restaurant assassinations on 17 September 1992 in Berlin, Germany. Abdullah Ghaderi Azar and Abdul Rahman Ghassemlou were buried on 20 July in Paris at Père Lachaise Cemetery.

=== Investigation ===
According to PDKI:

"In late November 1989 the Austrian courts issued a warrant for the arrest of the three Iranian representatives and the Austrian Government expressly accused the Iranian Government as having instigated the attack on Abdul Rahman Ghassemlou."

The three representatives of Iran's government in the negotiations with the Kurdish leaders returned to Iran freely. One of them had never been in custody, one was escorted by Austrian police to the Vienna airport nine days after the assassination, and the third, after one night of the arrest, spent a few months in the Iranian embassy in Vienna before he disappeared from Austria. One of the suspects was Mohamed Magaby, whom the Kurdish protesters in Vienna requested to be arrested and be put under travel ban. Warrants for their arrest were not issued until November 1989. The warrants have never been executed. Unlike the German Mykonos trial for the assassination of Ghassemlou's successor Sadegh Sharafkandi in Berlin, the assassination in Vienna was never clarified by any court. The Mykonos verdict of 1 April 1997 put the responsibility on the Iranian government of the time for the murders in Berlin and in Vienna.

Party political offices
Preceded by Ahmad Tofiq	Secretary-General of the Democratic Party of Iranian Kurdistan; 1973–1989	Succeeded by Sadegh Sharafkandi
