= Kazem Darabi =

Iranian intelligence service employee (b. 1964)

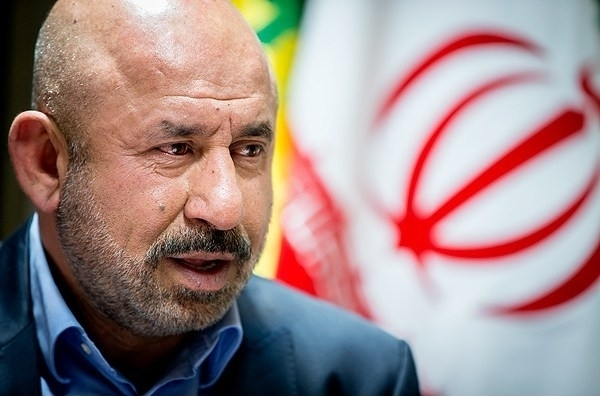
- Born: 1964 (age 61–62); Kazerun, Imperial State of Iran
- Known for: Organizing the Mykonos restaurant assassinations
- Status: Released
- Conviction: Murder (4 counts)
- Penalty: Life imprisonment

Kazem Darabi (Persian: کاظم دارابی; born 1964) is an Iranian intelligence service employee who was sentenced to life imprisonment by the Berlin Supreme Court for murdering four Kurdish dissidents in Berlin in 1992. According to the court proceedings, Darabi was the one who organized the Mykonos restaurant assassinations.

On 10 December 2007, Darabi was released early after 15 years in prison and then deported to Iran. Kazem Darabi was greeted by senior Foreign Ministry officials upon his return to Iran. The Iranian government agreed to release jailed German fisherman Donald Klein in exchange for the parole of Darabi.
