= Psychological torture =

Type of torture

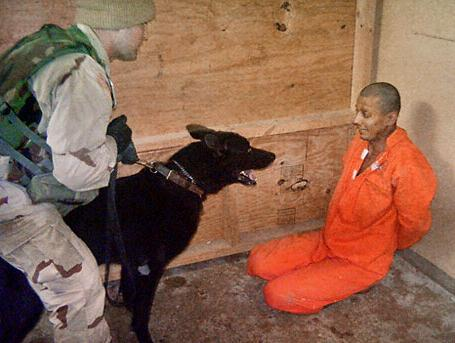
A prisoner at Abu Ghraib shows fear of a U.S. army dog during prisoner abuse.

Psychological torture, mental torture or emotional torture is a type of torture that relies primarily on psychological effects and only secondarily on any physical harm inflicted. Although not all psychological torture involves the use of physical violence, there is a continuum between psychological torture and physical torture. The two are often used in conjunction with one another and often overlap in practice, with the fear and pain induced by physical torture often resulting in long-term psychological effects and many forms of psychological torture involving some form of pain or coercion.

== United Nations Convention against Torture ==
The Convention against Torture and Other Cruel, Inhuman or Degrading Treatment or Punishment (commonly known as the United Nations Convention against Torture) is an international human rights treaty, under the review of the United Nations, that aims to prevent torture and other acts of cruel, inhuman, or degrading treatment or punishment around the world. The Convention requires states to take effective measures to prevent torture in any state under their jurisdiction and forbids states to transport people to any country where there is a reason to believe torture could occur.

The text of the Convention was adopted by the United Nations General Assembly on 10 December 1984 and following ratification by the 20th state party, it came into force on 26 June 1987. 26 June is now recognized as the International Day in Support of Victims of Torture, in honor of the Convention. As of May 2015, the Convention has 158 state parties.

The Convention gave for the first time in history a definition of psychological torture:

Torture is any act by which severe pain or suffering, whether physical or mental, is intentionally inflicted on a person for such purposes as obtaining from him or a third person information or a confession, punishing him for an act he or a third person has committed or is suspected of having committed, or intimidating or coercing him or a third person, or for any reason based on discrimination of any kind, when such pain or suffering is inflicted by or at the instigation of or with the consent or acquiescence of a public official or other person acting in an official capacity.

The Optional Protocol to such Convention (OPCAT, 2006) is an important addition to the United Nations Convention. The Committee Against Torture (CAT) is a body of independent experts that monitors implementation of the Convention by State parties. All-State parties are obliged under the Convention to submit regular reports to the CAT on how the rights are being implemented. Upon ratifying the Convention, States must submit a report within one year, after which they are obliged to report every four years. The Committee examines each report and addresses its concerns and recommendations to the State party in the form of "concluding observations". Under certain circumstances, the CAT may consider complaints or communications from individuals claiming that their rights under the Convention have been violated. The CAT usually meets in May and November each year in Geneva.

A contemporary definition of psychological torture are those processes that "involve attacking or manipulating the inputs and processes of the conscious mind that allow the person to stay oriented in the surrounding world, retain control and have the adequate conditions to judge, understand and freely make decisions which are the essential constitutive ingredients of an unharmed self". The Torturing Environment Scale is the first scale to measure Torturing Environments based on this model.

== Types of psychological torture ==
Many forms of psychological torture methods attempt to destroy the subject's normal self-image by removing them from any kind of control over their environment, isolation, monopolising of perception, impression of almightiness, creating a state of learned helplessness, psychological regression and depersonalization. Other techniques include humiliation, forced nudity and head shaving, exhausting by sleep deprivation, hooding and other forms of sensory deprivation.

A strictly fear-inducing method is the mock execution. Various threats operate on the same fear-inducing principle.

Torture methods can also be indirect, in which a victim is forced to witness the torture of another person, often a loved one. This preys on the victim's affection for and loyalty to a partner, relative, friend, comrade-in-arms, etc, whose real pain induces vicarious suffering in the targeted psychological victim, who is thus loaded with guilt but spared physical harm that might affect their ability to comply.

The publicly known systematics were developed in 1956 by the American psychiatrist Albert Biderman who examined several U.S. soldiers tortured by North Korean and Chinese secret services during the Korean war. He defined three basic actions to break the victims as dependence, debility, and dread. His work was further developed for the CIA.

=== White torture ===
White torture, often referred to as white room torture, is a technique aimed at complete sensory deprivation and isolation. A prisoner is held in a cell that is devoid of any color besides white, this method of torture is designed to deprive the prisoner of all senses and identity.

Visually, the prisoner is deprived of all colour. Guards stand in silence, wearing padded shoes to avoid making any noise. Typically, prisoners will become depersonalized by losing personal identity for extended periods of isolation. Other effects can include hallucinations or psychosis.

== Effect of torture ==
While psychological torture may not leave any lasting physical damage—indeed, this is often one of the motivations for using psychological rather than physical torture—it can result in similar levels of permanent mental damage to its victims.

Psychological torture methods were devised by, and in conjunction with, doctors and psychologists. Medical participation in torture has taken place throughout the world and was a prominent feature of the US interrogation practice in military and Central Intelligence Agency (CIA) facilities.

== Incidents of torture ==
=== Iran ===
In Iran, white torture (Persian: شكنجه سفيد) has been practiced on political prisoners by the Islamic republic. Most political prisoners who experience this type of torture are journalists held in the Evin prison. "Amir Fakhravar, the Iranian white room prisoner, was tortured at Evin prison for 8 months in 2004. He still has trauma regarding his times in the white room." According to Hadi Ghaemi, such tortures in Evin are not necessarily authorized directly by the Iranian government.

It can include prolonged periods of solitary confinement, the use of continual illumination to deprive sleep (listed in the Geneva Convention on Basic Human Rights, 1949) often in detention centers outside the control of the prison authorities, including Section 209 of Evin Prison.

Ahmed Shaheed, the United Nations special human rights reporter in Iran, mentioned in a statement that human rights activist Vahid Asghari was psychologically tortured by means of long-term detention in solitary confinement and with threats to arrest, torture or rape his family members. He was also reportedly tortured with severe beatings for the purpose of eliciting confessions.

A 2004 Amnesty International report documented the use of white torture on Amir Fakhravar by the Revolutionary Guards, the first known example of white torture in Iran. It states that "his cells had no windows, and the walls and his clothes were white. His meals consisted of white rice on white plates. To use the toilet, he had to put a white piece of paper under the door. He was forbidden to speak, and the guards reportedly wore shoes that muffled sound". Upon his arrival in the US, Fakhravar confirmed this report in an interview with Christian Broadcasting Network.

In a telephone call to the Human Rights Watch in 2004, the Iranian journalist Ebrahim Nabavi said:

Since I left Evin, I have not been able to sleep without sleeping pills. It is terrible. The loneliness never leaves you, long after you are 'free.' Every door that is closed on you.... This is why we call it 'white torture.' They get what they want without having to hit you. They know enough about you to control the information that you get: they can make you believe that the president has resigned, that they have your wife, that someone you trust has told them lies about you. You begin to break. And once you break, they have control. And then you begin to confess.

=== United States ===
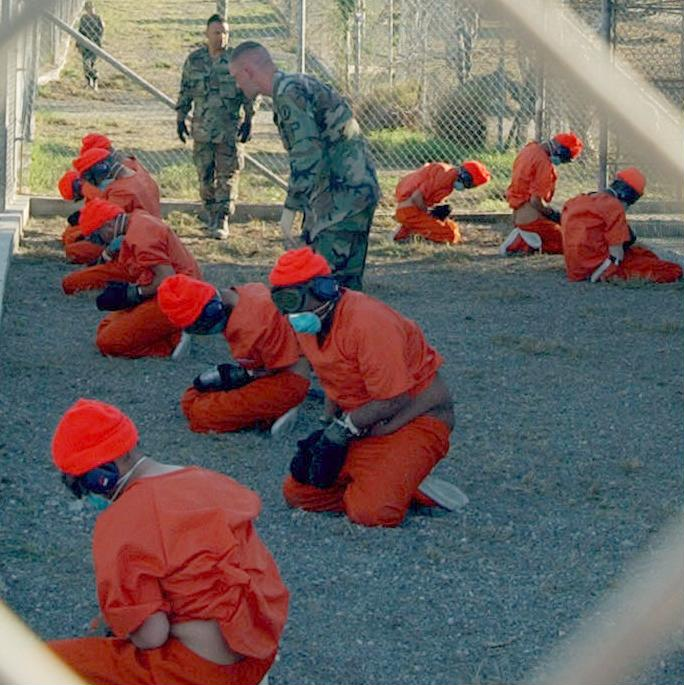
Detainees upon arrival at Camp X-Ray in January 2002, wearing goggles, masks, gloves, and earmuffs.

The United States made extensive use of psychological torture techniques at Guantanamo Bay and other sites subsequent to the 9/11 attacks. The United States has held Guantanamo Bay detention camp prisoners under sensory deprivation, with their ears and eyes covered, hands and feet tied, hands in thick gloves, and held in cages without any privacy, always observed under a light that is on day and night. The organization of European Democratic Lawyers (EDL) said that this constitutes white torture and has accused the United States of violating prisoners' fundamental rights. Prisoners are also held in "extreme isolation", confined to windowless cells, going days "without seeing daylight" suffering what Amnesty International and other international human rights organizations have said are torture techniques approved by the George W. Bush administration under the euphemism "enhanced interrogation". Rainer Mausfeld, a researcher in the field of psychology and cognitive science, has criticized the practice.

=== Venezuela ===
According to human rights organizations and other NGOs, the Bolivarian Intelligence Service (SEBIN) of the Venezuelan government holds political prisoners in the lower levels of SEBIN's headquarters, which has been deemed by government officials La Tumba "The Tomb". The cells are two by three meters (6 ft 7 in by 9 ft 10 in) with a cement bed, white walls, and security barriers between one another so that there is no interaction between prisoners. Such conditions have caused prisoners to become very ill, but they are denied medical treatment. Bright lights in the cells are kept on so prisoners lose their sense of time and the temperature is below freezing, with the only sounds heard being from the nearby Caracas Metro trains. Reports of torture in La Tumba, specifically white torture, are also common, with some prisoners attempting to commit suicide. Such conditions according to the NGO Justice and Process are to make prisoners plead guilty to the crimes that they are accused of.

== See also ==
- Chinese water torture
- Gaslighting
- KUBARK
- Psychological torture methods
- Psychology of torture
- Torture
- United Nations Convention against Torture
- White torture
- Zersetzung
