= Amir Fakhravar =

Iranian political activist

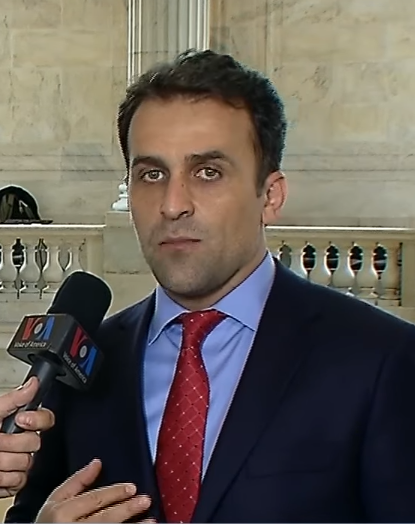
- Fakhravar interviewed by VOA in 2018
- Born: c. 1974 or 1975 (age 50–51); Iran
- Occupations: Author; Activist
- Organization(s): Confederation of Iranian Students; Institute of World Politics
- Political party: National Iranian Congress

Amir Abbas Fakhravar (Note: Persian: امیر عباس فخرآور) (born 1974 or 1975) is an Iranian political activist and dissident. He is the founder and senate chairman of the National Iranian Congress (NIC) an organization opposing the Islamic Republic regime in Iran.

He is a former research fellow at the Center for the Study of Culture and Security at The Institute of World Politics. Fakhravar served as the Secretary General of the Confederation of Iranian Students and President of the "Iranian Freedom Institute" in Washington, D.C.

== Life in Iran ==
=== Activities ===
Fakhravar was a student leader during Iran student protests, July 1999. In 2006, he testified on Capitol Hill and was invited to attend a meeting at the White House.

=== Imprisonment ===
An Amnesty International press release published in 2004, designates Fakhravar as a prisoner of conscience who was sentenced to eight years of imprisonment for defamation charges in November 2002, because of comments he made on Iranian authorities in his book, This Place is Not a Ditch. The statement further adds sometime between January and February 2004, he was held at Ward 325, where he was reportedly subject to solitary confinement and white torture, before being granted a 2-days furlough on or around 8 February 2004. According to the same release, he was moved to Qasr prison upon his return and on or around 21 March, he was given another leave lasting 19 days for the new year holidays, as part of an annual temporary release of prisoners.

On 17 July 2005, Eli Lake interviewed Fakhravar while on temporary release, in which he said, "I forgot to report back to prison" and that he was going to ignore his arrest warrant. In October 2005, RFE/RL reported that Fakhravar had been on leave since June of the same year, and has told them about his decision to refuse to return to prison and his sister of being informed at the court that government forces are authorized to shoot him on sight.

Various Iranian detractors have contested allegations of Fakhravar and his credentials as a political prisoner.

=== Fleeing Iran ===
Fakhravar took a commercial flight to Dubai, United Arab Emirates. A WikiLeaks cable from the American Consul writes that Fakhravar left Iran "while on prison leave" and "with the help of 'friends' who bribed [Iranian] airport officials not to enter his name into the computer".

== Activities in the United States ==
Upon his arrival, Fakhravar was invited as a guest of honor at an American Enterprise Institute (AEI) lunch, co-hosted by Richard Perle and Michael Ledeen; and was given office space by the Foundation for Defense of Democracies (FDD). He called for unified opposition to the Iranian government, to bring regime change in Iran.

He met American officials from the Pentagon to the State Department, as well as with Vice President Dick Cheney and President George W. Bush.

Fakhravar founded 'Iran Enterprise Institute' (IEI), which took its name as well as some of its funding from the AEI. According to a source talking to The American Prospect, in 2006 he applied for U.S. government funds appropriated by Iran Freedom and Support Act for three projects totaling $3 million, but it is unclear how much money, if any was received.

In 2013, he established a 'National Iran Congress (NIC), and drafted a constitution modeled after the constitution of Western countries for future Iran.

=== Testifies at congressional hearings ===
On July 20, 2006, Fakhravar testified at U.S. Senate Committee on Homeland Security and Governmental Affairs representing Independent student movement, where he called the Iranian reform movement a "dead end" and advocated regime change.

=== 2012 trip to Israel ===
Israeli foreign ministry refused to grant Fakhravar a visa in 2011, following an invitation by an Israeli institute. Yossi Melman of Haaretz reported that his denial was a result of efforts made by Richard Horowitz, a New York attorney and former IDF officer who brought concerns about his credibility and motivations to Israeli officials.

In late January 2012, Amir Abbas Fakhravar and other members of the Confederation of Iranian Students (CIS), visited Israel to speak with members of parliament and Israeli opinion makers. On 28 January, Fakhravar, together with CIS member Saghar Erica Kasraie, met with Israeli lawmaker Tzipi Livni in Tel Aviv. Livni then met with Kadima MK Nachman Shai, and made a statement afterwards. On 30 January, Jerusalem Post held an interview with Fakhravar, who stated his belief that any "attack [from Israel] will bring ayatollahs [and its] allies public legitimacy." On the same day, Fakhravar spoke during a panel discussion at the 12th Annual Herzliya Conference, titled "Iran: Will Sanctions Work?". On the 31st, Fakhravar paid a visit to the Knesset building, and met with Kadima MK Shai Hermesh discussing Israeli support for the Iranian opposition.

=== Election boycotts ===
In the 2005 Iranian presidential elections, he supported boycotting the elections in Iran, claiming that the regime has no legitimacy and that the presidential elections should be turned into a referendum. Fakhravar strongly opposed president Mahmoud Ahmadinejad's attempts of a "second cultural revolution," such as appointing hardliner clerics such as Amid Zanjani, famous for his work as a religious prosecutor, as chancellor of Tehran University.

== Political leaning and views ==
Fakhravar's views have been described as neoconservative.

He is a proponent of regime change policy and support for military action against Iran. According to Connie Bruck of The New Yorker, his political stance has been praised by Sheldon Adelson.

In an interview with Ynet, Fakhravar said that if the West launches a military attack on Iran, "The top brass will flee immediately. People will come out onto the streets protesting, why are we being bombed? Many of the regime' mid-level officials will shave their beards, don ties and join the (civilians) on the streets."

== Publications ==
Fakhravar has written for two Iranian pro-reform newspapers, namely Khordad and Mosharekat.

He has authored the following books:

- The Greenest Eyes on Earth (1998)
- This Place is not a Ditch (2000)
- Still, the Scraps of Prison (2005)
- Fakhravar, Amir Abbas (2016). Comrade Ayatollah: Soviet kGB's Role In The Islamic Revolution and The Rise Of Khamenei To Power in Iran. Ketab.com. p. 700. ISBN 9781595845214.
- The Spirit of the Constitutional Law (2024)

=== Reception ===
Fakhravar says he was convicted and tortured for his book This Place is not a Ditch, which was a finalist for the 2001-2002 version of 'Paulo Coelho Literary Prize'. Journalist Laura Rozen states that the existence of such an award has been questioned.

English PEN bestowed him honorary membership in March 2004, and he was recognized on Day of the Imprisoned Writer on 15 November 2004 by Writers in Prison Committee of International PEN.

Fakhravar wrote in his book Comrade Ayatollah that Supreme Leader of Iran Ali Khamenei is a Soviet agent trained by KGB. He told Asharq Al-Awsat that the book includes hundreds of documents, adding, "I obtained the documents from the KJB [sic] archive, as well as the CIA and Israeli Mossad and even the Iranian intelligence itself. I did not use a single Iranian opposition document". Belén Fernández describes the book as a successful appeal to attract the attention of Trump administration officials and like-minded media like Fox News.

== Documentaries ==
- "The Case for War:In Defense of Freedom" in 2007, Amir Abbas Fakhravar participated Richard Perle presented this documentary articulating his view of the challenges facing the U.S. post 9/11, and debating with his critics including Richard Holbrooke, Simon Jenkins, and Abdel Bari Atwan. The film was broadcast by PBS in their series America at a Crossroads.
- Forbidden Iran in 2004, Fakhravar's story and organization was one of the main parts of this documentary about the Iranian Student Movement and July 9, 1999.
