= Day of the Imprisoned Writer =

International day to support persecuted writers

PEN International Day of the Imprisoned Writer

The Day of the Imprisoned Writer is an annual, international day intended to recognize and support writers who resist repression of the basic human right to freedom of expression and who stand up to attacks made against their right to impart information. This day is observed each year on November 15. It was started in 1981 by PEN International's Writers in Prison Committee.

In addition to increasing the public's awareness of persecuted writers in general, PEN uses the Day of the Imprisoned Writer to direct attention to several specific persecuted or imprisoned writers and their individual circumstances. Each of the selected writers is from a different part of the world, and each case represents circumstances of repression that occur when governments or other entities in power feel threatened by what writers have written. On this day, the general public is encouraged to take action—in the form of donations and letters of appeal—on behalf of the selected writers.

The day also serves to commemorate all of the writers killed since the previous year's Day of the Imprisoned Writer. Between November 15, 2007, and November 15, 2008, at least 39 writers from around the world were killed in circumstances that appeared to be related to their professions.

== Highlighted writers from past observances ==
2013

- Kunchok Tsephel Gopey Tsang; internet writer and website editor, China - Tibet
- Dina Meza; human rights defender and journalist, Honduras
- Zahra Rahnavard; author and political activist, Iran
- Rodney Sieh; newspaper founder, publisher and editor-in-chief, Liberia
- Fazıl Say; writer, composer and musician, Turkey

2012

- Muharrem Erbey; human rights lawyer and writer, Turkey
- Shiva Nazar Ahari; journalist, activist and blogger; Iran
- Ericson Acosta, poet, songwriter and activist, Philippines
- Eskinder Nega; journalist and blogger, Ethiopia
- Regina Martínez; journalist, Mexico

2011

- Abduljalil al-Singace; blogger and human rights defender, Bahrain
- Reeyot Alemu; opposition journalist, Ethiopia
- Nedim Sener and Ahmet Şık; writers in prison, Turkey
- Susana Chavez Castillo; poet and human rights defender, Mexico
- Tashi Rabten (pen-name Te’urang); dissident writer, Tibet

2010

- Robert Mintya; newspaper editor, Cameroon
- Hossein Derakhshan; blogger, Iran
- Bladimir Antuna (full name José Bladimir Antuna García); crime reporter, Mexico
- Tal Al-Mallouhi; blogger and poet, Syria
- Dilmurod Saidov; journalist, Uzbekistan

2009

- Lapiro De Mbanga; singer-songwriter, Cameroon
- Liu Xiaobo; dissident writer, China
- Maziar Bahari; journalist, editor, playwright and film-maker, Iran
- Miguel Ángel Gutiérrez Ávila; anthropologist, author and activist, Mexico
- Natalia Estemirova; journalist and human rights defender, Russia

2008

- Eynullah Fatullayev; journalist, Azerbaijan
- Melissa Rocío Patiño Hinostroza; student and poet, Peru
- Mohammad Sadiq Kaboudvand; journalist, Iran
- Tsering Woeser; writer and poet, China
- Writers, Cast and Crew of The Crocodile of Zambezi; Zimbabwe

2007

- Normando Hernanez Gonzalez; journalist, Cuba
- Jamshid Karimov; journalist, Ouzbekistan
- Fatou Jaw Manneh; journalist, Gambia
- Yaghoub Yadali; novelist, Iran
- Zargana Maung Thura; poet and comedian, Burma

2006

- Hrant Dink; newspaper editor, Turkey
- Wesenseged Gebrekidan; journalist, Ethiopia
- Lydia Cacho; writer, Mexico
- Yang Xiaoqing; internet journalist, China

2005

- Orhan Pamuk; writer, Turkey
- Shi Tao; poet and activist, China
- Dr. Roya Toloui; writer and women’s rights activist, Iran
- Paul Kamara; journalist, Sierra Leone
- Victor Rolando Arroyo; journalist, Cuba

2004

- Amir-Abbas Fakhravar; writer, Iran
- Rakhim Esenov; writer, Turkmenistan
- Guy-André Kieffer; journalist, Ivory Coast
- Roberto Javier Mora García, Francisco Ortiz Franco, and Francisco Arratia Saldierna; journalists, murdered in Mexico

== See also ==
- Reporters Without Borders
