= Killing of Shivan Qaderi =

Iranian murder victim (died 2005)

Shivan Qaderi (a.k.a. Sayed Kamal Astam, Sayed Kamal Astom, Shwane Qadri, or Sayed Kamal Asfaram, in Kurdish: Şivan Qaderî) was an Iranian Kurd who, together with two other Kurdish men, was shot by Iranian security forces in Mahabad, on July 9, 2005. Iranian authorities confirmed that Qaderi, "who was on the run and wanted by the judiciary", was shot and killed while allegedly evading arrest. According to the Iranian sources he was a "criminal and smuggler" and according to the opposition groups he was an "opposition activist".

For the next six weeks, riots and protests erupted in Kurdish towns and villages throughout Western Iran such as Mahabad, Sanandaj, Sardasht, Piranshahr, Oshnavieh, Baneh, Bokan and Saqiz. The Kurdistan Free Life Party said that about 50,000 people had protested after his death on the Chuwarchira Square. After he was shot, Iranian soldiers reportedly tied Ghaderi's body to a vehicle and dragged it through the city.

The Iranian authorities also down several major Kurdish newspapers arresting reporters and editors. Among those arrested were several well-known Kurdish human rights defenders and activists. Roya Toloui, a women’s rights activist and journalist, was detained at her home in Sanandaj on 2 August. Her husband said she had been denied visits and was being held on charges of “disturbing the peace” and “acting against national security”. Journalist Mohammad Seddigh Kaboudvand was also arrested that same day.

On 13 March 2006, Saleh Nikbakht, a prominent Iranian human rights lawyer representing Qaderi, said that the person who killed him was a police officer who had unlawfully opened fire. He also stated that both the shooter and the official who gave the order were under investigation, and that the judiciary had so far cooperated.
