= Toloui =

Toloui (Persian: طُلوعی) is a Persian surname. Notable people with the surname include:

- Ramin Toloui (fl. 2011), American government official
- Roya Toloui (born 1966), Iranian journalist
