= National Iranian Congress =

- Leader: Amir Abbas Fakhravar
- Founder: Arzhang Davoodi
- Founded: 2013
- Slogan: National Congress of Iranians; For a free and democratic Iranian

Election symbol
- NIC

Website
- iraniancongress.com

National Iranian Congress (NIC) (Persian: کنگره ملی ایرانیان) is a U.S.-based political organization founded in 2013. Led by Amir Abbas Fakhravar as an offshoot of his Confederation of Iranian Students (CIS), it is a proponent of regime change in Iran and has drafted a constitution for the future regime. It is cofounded by Arzhang Davoodi.

Amir Abbas Fakhravar visited Knesset of Israel in 2012.

== Proposed Draft Constitution of Iran ==
"We the People of Iran, for the purpose of forming a better society and establishing liberty, security, peace and justice for ourselves and our future generations, have penned this Constitution as the basis upon which a government worthy of the Iranian people can be founded."

== Article I ==
The vote of the majority of the Iranian people, which is a reflection of their universal wisdom, shall be the utmost authority on all decision-making processes and no person, group, religion or ideology, whether earthly or celestial, has precedence over it under any circumstances. The people of Iran shall have equal rights regardless of gender, ethnicity or religious affiliation and have equal rights to directly participate in national affairs. The right to live, to exercise free speech, to guard one's reputation and to have a fair trial are fundamental rights that shall not be usurped or violated by popular vote or legislation. Legislators shall be prohibited from enacting laws that extend preference to any religion or ideology or prohibit the practice of any religion or ideology. Freedom of the press, political party activism, non-governmental organization participation and the right to protest peacefully against the government shall be rights protected by law. Capital punishment, torture of any kind and solitary confinement under any circumstances shall be strictly prohibited.

== Article II ==
The form of Iranian government, Republic or Constitutional Monarchy, shall be determined through a referendum by a majority vote of the Iranian people. Iran's government shall consist of three branches: executive, legislative and judicial. While working in unison, each branch shall maintain its independence and the principle of separation of powers shall be consistently observed. The Head of the Executive Branch and all members of the Judicial Branch are elected directly by Iranian voters.

== Article III ==
Current provincial boundaries shall be complied with. Iran has thirty three provinces : East Azarbaijan, West Azarbaijan, Ardebil, Isfahan, Alborz, Ilam, Baluchestan, Bushehr, Persepolis, Tehran, Chaharmahal and Bakhtiari, Khorasan Razavi, Southern Khorasan, North Khorasan, Khuzestan, Zanjan, Semnan, Sistan, Shiraz, Qazvin, Qom, Kurdistan, Kerman, Kermanshah, Kohgiluyeh and Boyerahmad, Golestan, Gilan, Lorestan, Mazandaran, Central, Hormozgan, Hamedan and Yazd. Each Province shall elect a Provincial Parliament, Provincial Governor, and Provincial Judiciary within the framework of this Constitution. However, the right to form an army and to communicate with other countries shall remain exclusive to the national government.

== Article IV ==
=== Section 1 ===
The sole institution that shall have the power to legislate is the Congress which consists of the House of Representatives and the Senate. Congressional hearings will be open to the public, subject to the priority of protecting national security information. The venue for congressional meetings will only be in the official congress building. Hearings shall be convened with the presence of at least one more than half the members.

Congress shall not enact laws that are inconsistent with the principles of this Constitution. In cases of dispute, the Supreme Court shall be responsible for settling the issue.

Being a member of Congress is a position that belongs to an elected official and shall not be transferable to another person. Congress shall not concede its legislative powers to another individual or group.

=== Section 2 ===
The Iran House of Representatives shall have 300 members. Each of the 33 provinces has representatives relative to the population of that province. These representatives are elected by direct vote of people for a term of three years. All Iranian citizens above the age of 18 are eligible to vote and all Iranian citizens above the age of 25 are eligible to become candidates for the House of Representatives. Elections of each term shall be held before the end of the previous term to avoid lapses in Congressional activities. The House Speaker and other Congressional leaders will be elected according to the rules specified in the internal regulations. If a Representative fails to complete his/her term for any reason (illness, resignation, death or discharge from duty), early elections shall be held for that constituency. The newly elected representative shall complete the remainder of the term or longer, subject to re-election.

=== Section 3 ===
Congressional Representatives shall include the House of Representatives members and the Senators. Each shall swear and sign the oath of office at their first session in Congress, as follows: “I, swear in the presence of the people of Iran to protect the Constitution of Iran, to defend national interests and to always serve the Iranian people while fulfilling my duties as their elected Representative.” Representatives may take the oath of office by putting their hand on their own Holy Book if they so choose. Representatives who do not attend the first session upon being elected shall take the oath of office at the first session they attend.

=== Section 4 ===
The House of Representatives is the only branch that shall have the power to commence impeachment proceedings of the Head of the Executive Branch or the Head of the Judicial Branch. Impeachment of the Head of the Executive Branch requires the approval of two-thirds and that of the Judiciary Head requires the vote of three-fourths of the House. Upon passing, the House shall notify the Senate.

=== Section 5 ===
The Senate shall consist of 100 Senators. Each of the 33 Provinces shall have three Senators. All Iranian citizens above the age of 18 are eligible to vote and all Iranian citizens above the age of 30 are eligible to become candidates for the Senate. Senators shall be elected for a nine-year term.

Exceptionally, in the first Senate election after the adoption of this Constitution, the term for the candidate with the lowest number of votes from each province shall be three years; the second highest, six years; and, the candidate with the highest vote, nine years.

The Provincial Governor shall appoint a person as Senator if an elected Senator from that Province fails to complete his/her term for any reason. This person shall hold the position until the next three-year election. The elected Senator in this election shall only hold this position until the end of the previous Senator's term.

The Vice President, who has been indirectly elected by the Iranian people along with the President, shall also act as the one hundredth Senator. His/her term shall be three years and he/she shall also act as the President of the Senate. He/she shall manage the prioritization of projects and bills and shall communicate with other branches of government along with the Senate leadership who are elected from Senators in each term.

=== Section 6 ===
Approval or dismissal of appointments made by the President, including ministers, political, economic, judicial, security and military directors, shall be within the authority of the Senate and shall require 50% plus one vote of the Senate. If the House passes a resolution to impeach the Head of the Executive Branch or the Head of the Judicial Branch, the Senate shall have the sole power to try the impeachment. It is possible to remove the Head of State by A two-thirds majority vote of the Senate shall be required to remove the Head of the Executive Branch and a three-fourths majority vote of the Senate shall be required to remove the Head of the Judicial Branch. The Senate shall only exonerate or, in case of conviction, remove the charged individual from office. It shall not impose penalties on the individual or the affiliated party.

=== Section 7 ===
The Provincial Legislature shall decide the time, place and manner of holding the Senate and House of Representatives elections in each Province. These elections shall be held under the supervision of the National Electoral Commission.

=== Section 8 ===
The National Electoral Commission shall have seven official members and thirty three observer members. Official members of the National Electoral Commission are nominated by the President for a five-year term. They shall start their work only after receiving Senate approval. Each Province shall have one member in the National Electoral Commission's Observers Council. They shall be appointed by Provincial Governors to the National Electoral Commission for a five-year term. The law shall specify the duties of the National Electoral Commission and its procedures. Each official or observer member of the National Electoral Commission shall serve one non-renewable term. Observer members shall not vote in this Commission.

=== Section 9 ===
The House of Representatives and Senate sessions shall be open to the public and these hearings shall be broadcast through the national media to inform the public. Proposed legislation shall pass only if approved by more than half the total members.

In urgent circumstances related to national security, closed sessions may be held upon the request of the President, or nine members of the Senate, or 30 members of the House of Representatives. Legislation arising from closed sessions requires the approval of three-quarters of the Representatives. After the national security issues are resolved and upon such determination by two-thirds of Congress, minutes of these hearings and the resulting legislation shall be published for public consumption.

=== Section 10 ===
In the performance of their duties, each member of the House of Representatives and the Senate shall be free to vote on issues and comment on them either in Congressional session or outside it. They shall not be subject to legal prosecution for their votes or comments as a member of Congress either during or after their term of office.

=== Section 11 ===
Congress shall have the power to investigate all matters of the country and the actions of the government and the judiciary.

=== Section 12 ===
Congress shall have the power to refer for the people's direct vote in a referendum, economic, political, social and cultural issues. A referendum may be requested by the President, or one-third of the House of Representatives, or one-third of the Senate, or one-thirtieth of the eligible voters and shall be conducted if approved by half of the House of Representatives.

=== Section 13 ===
Congress shall legislate in all matters of the country within the limits prescribed in the Constitution. Setting the government's budget, imposing taxes, receiving domestic and foreign loans, allocating resources for public defense and public assistance shall be within the scope of the legislative authority of the Congress. Bills proposed by the government shall be submitted to the House of Representatives for consideration. Legislative bills shall be proposed by at least 15 members of the House for consideration. The time of the review for each proposed government bill shall be announced to the related ministry and a representative of that ministry shall appear before the House for advisory purposes during the review. Further requirements shall be determined by law. Proposed legislation and amendments that reduce public income or increase public expenditures shall be accompanied by practical solutions for funding them.

All proposals and bills approved by the House of Representatives and the Senate shall be signed by the President to become law. Congress may vote again on legislation that has not been approved by the President and if more than two-thirds of the House and the Senate vote to pass the legislation, it shall no longer require the President's signature and shall become enforceable law. The government may return the legislation to Congress with a conditional approval subject to specified amendments. Upon the approval of Congress, the amended legislation shall become law. The President shall have nine days after receiving legislative proposals from Congress to decide on rejection, confirmation or requesting amendments.

=== Section 14 ===
Treaties, conventions, protocols, contracts and international agreements shall be approved by two-thirds of the House followed by two-thirds of the Senate. Receiving domestic or foreign loans or offering domestic or foreign aid shall be approved by two-thirds of House members and shall be publicly announced. Changes to national boundaries are prohibited except for minor amendments considered in the national interest and preserving the territorial integrity of the country. Additionally, these amendments shall be approved by four-fifths of the House and four-fifths of the Senate.

=== Section 15 ===
Provincial Parliaments shall be formed to provide for the direct participation of people in supervising the implementation of programs and monitoring the rapid progress of social, economic, developmental, health, cultural, educational and welfare programs. The members of these Provincial Parliaments shall be directly elected by the people of the same Province. The requirements for voters and elected members, their scope of responsibility and supervisory authority and the election proceedings shall comply with the principles of national unity and territorial integrity of the country and shall remain within the framework of this Constitution. The set of laws passed by Provincial Parliaments shall not be out of the Constitution's boundary or be contrary to legislation passed by Congress. The impact of laws passed by Provincial Parliaments shall not be out of the geographical and judicial scope of that Province. Moreover, Provincial Parliaments shall not have the power to ratify any bill, proposal, or plan that directly or indirectly sets the grounds for the separation of one or more Provinces or parts of Provinces from Iran. Provincial Parliaments shall be dissolved in the event of such an action and the national government shall control the Province until new Provincial Parliamentary elections are held.

=== Section 16 ===
None of Iran's thirty-three Provinces shall have the power to establish an army or to declare war on other Provinces or any foreign countries. Signing international treaties and regulating imports and exports shall be within the exclusive bounds of the authority of the Congress of Iran and outside the scope of the Provincial Parliament's authority. Provincial Parliaments shall act only within the framework provided by the Constitution to facilitate the export and import affairs in each Province and shall only do so with direct permission and direct monitoring of Congress.

=== Section 17 ===
The Supreme Court shall interpret the Constitution and determine the existence of any conflict between passed legislation and the Constitution. Requests for interpretation of the Constitution shall be sent to the Supreme Court by the President or the leadership of the House of Representatives and the Senate.

=== Section 18 ===
Proposing an amendment or amendments removing, adding, or editing parts of this Constitution shall require a majority of four-fifths of both the House of Representatives and the Senate. These changes, after approval of the Congress, shall require a majority of fifty percent plus one vote in a national referendum for an amendment to the Constitution to come into force.

== Article V ==
=== Section 1 ===
The Executive branch shall be the only branch that has the responsibility for executive power, and the President shall be the head of this branch. The President and Vice President shall be elected by direct vote for a term of three years, and the President's re-election is only possible just for another three-year term. Serving as President for more than two terms is strictly prohibited.

=== Section 2 ===
All Iranian-born people who have Iranian citizenship shall be eligible to become presidential candidates as long as they are at least thirty-five years of age. All candidates shall officially declare their candidacy before the start of the election by registering with the National Electoral Commission. Each presidential candidate shall nominate a candidate for vice president who meets the requirements listed above for presidential candidacy to the National Electoral Commission. The law shall determine the procedures governing the conduct of presidential elections. The President and Vice President are elected by at least 51% of the votes cast. If none of the candidates attains such a majority in the first round, a second round of voting shall occur two weeks later. In the second round, only the two presidential candidates who obtained the most votes in the first round shall run. The candidate with the most votes cast in this second round shall be elected President. If one of the two candidates withdraws during the time between the first round and the second round, the remaining candidate in the electoral campaign shall be President with the Vice President. The election of a new President shall be concluded two months before the end of the preceding presidential term. At no time shall the country have two presidents. The incumbent president shall remain in office until the time of the swearing in of the President-Elect.

The President-Elect shall be sworn in with the attendance of members of the House and Senate, and the Head of the Judicial Branch and shall sign the oath of office as follows: “I, as the President of Iran, swear to the people of Iran, to be the implementer, guardian, and defender of the Constitution of Iran and to always be in the service of the Iranian people while performing my presidential duties.” The President- Elect may take the oath of office by putting his/her hand on his/her Holy Book if he/she so chooses.

=== Section 3 ===
The President shall be answerable to the people and the Congress within the limits of the powers and responsibilities that the Constitution and the related laws have afforded him/her. The President shall present congressional legislation that he has signed or the outcome of referendums to the proper authorities for implementation. The Vice President, who is elected by indirect vote, shall be the President of the Senate and shall assume the role of President if for any reason (illness, resignation, death or dismissal) the President is not able to complete his/her three-year term, for the remainder of the term after being sworn in. If for any reason, the Vice-President is unable to continue his/her term, the head of the House of Representatives shall be responsible for his/her duties. The President nominates the Cabinet of Ministers and submits them to the Senate for approval. All Ministers shall be approved by the Senate before assuming their official roles.

=== Section 4 ===
The President shall be responsible for foreign affairs and communication with other countries and international organizations as the official representative of the people of Iran. The President shall be in charge of the country's short-term plans, budget and the government's administrative and employment affairs, and he/she can delegate these authorities. The President or his/her legal representative shall sign agreements relating to international unions, protocols, treaties, Iranian government and any of its ministries’ contracts with other governments or the private sector after Congressional approval. In special cases and if circumstances necessitate it, the President may appoint Special Representatives with specified authorities. Under these conditions, the Special Representatives’ decisions will be deemed as those of the President. Ambassadors are nominated by the Foreign Minister and shall be approved by the President. The President signs the credentials of the Ambassadors and accepts the credentials of the Ambassadors of other countries. In addition to the duties assigned to the President by the principles of this law and ordinary laws, the following duties also shall be the responsibility of the President and he/she shall not delegate them to another person:

- Commander-in-Chief of the Armed Forces,
- Declarations of war and peace with the approval of Congress,
- Appointing, dismissing and accepting the resignation of the Head of the Joint Chiefs of Staff, Supreme Commanders of the Armed Forces, with the approval of the Congress
- Amnesty or reduced punishment for Convicts or sentenced persons upon the recommendation of the Head of the Judicial Branch
- Granting government badges and medals

The President may appoint an Administrator for up to three months for ministries that do not have a Senate-confirmed Minister. Each of the Ministers shall be answerable for his/her specific duties to the President and Congress.

=== Section 5 ===
The President, Vice-President, Ministers, and employees of the executive branch shall not hold concurrent positions in government. They also shall not hold any other concurrent positions at the time of their government service including positions in institutions that are partially or wholly funded by the government or public foundations and institutions. They shall not concurrently assume any positions in the legislative or judicial branch, nor sit on the board of or serve as legal advisor at any private or public institution.

Criminal charges against the President, Vice President and any of the Ministers that are unrelated to their government position will be prosecuted in public courts. Congress shall review the assets of the President, Vice President and their Cabinet and each of these individual's spouse and children at the start and finish of their term and shall investigate any irregularities.

=== Section 6 ===
The Governor of each Province shall be elected by the direct vote of the people of that Province for a term of three years. Provincial Governors shall serve no more than two terms. Provincial Governors shall be responsible for the conduct of affairs within their respective Provincial borders, but their decisions shall not be in conflict with the national government. If the President of Iran does not agree with a decision made by a Provincial Governor, the President shall have the power to veto the decision of any Provincial Governor. The President also shall have the authority to request that the Senate remove a Provincial Governor if he/she determines that the Provincial Governor's decision violates national law.

== Article VI ==
=== Section 1 ===
The Judicial Branch shall be established to serve justice and includes the Supreme Court, Appeals Court, Trial Court and the office of the Attorney General. The Judiciary shall conduct trials in criminal or civil proceedings, prevention and discovery of criminal activity, prosecution of criminals within the legal confines of statute of limitations and the proportionality of crime and punishment. Trials shall be public. Supervision of the Executive and Legislative Branch, monitoring proper implementation of the law in general and preparation of judicial bills and introducing them to Congress for approval also shall be within the scope of the Judicial Branch's responsibilities.

=== Section 2 ===
The Head of the Judicial Branch, Chief Justice under a Republic or King under a Constitutional Monarchy, shall be elected by the Iranian people for a term of twelve years and may run for reelection. The Head of the Judicial Branch shall have the following responsibilities: administering the court system and all institutions and offices required by the Judicial Branch in its legal, administrative and executive affairs, preparation and submission of judicial bills to Congress, nomination of Attorney General to the President and the Senate for confirmation, preparation and submission of the judicial budget to the House for approval, appointment and dismissal of Judges and local Attorneys General in accordance with related laws. If, for any reason (illness, death, or dismissal) the Head of the Judicial Branch is not able to fulfill his term in office, elections shall be held for a new Head of the Judicial Branch. Monitoring the appropriate implementation of the law, monitoring the actions of the government and the Congress shall also be within the scope of the responsibilities of the Head of the Judicial Branch.

=== Section 3 ===
The Attorney General is nominated by the Head of the Judicial Branch and the nomination is presented to the President. If approved by the President, his/her nomination shall be submitted to the Senate for confirmation. If the Head of the Judicial Branch and the President cannot agree on a nominee within three months, the President shall submit his/her nominee to the Senate for confirmation. The Attorney General shall be responsible for appointing local prosecutors and supervising criminal and civil cases with the cooperation of police forces. Only the Senate shall have the power to impeach the Attorney General and his/ her dismissal shall require 50% plus one votes.

=== Section 4 ===
The Supreme Court shall be the highest judicial authority in the country. The Supreme Court shall also be the highest court of appeal. The following duties shall be assigned to the Supreme Court:

- Monitor the proper enforcement of laws in the courts
- Jurisdictional uniformity
- Matching laws and court rulings with the constitution

The Supreme Court shall consist of thirty-three members, each of whom shall represent one Province and shall be selected from the senior Justices of that Province. The term of service for members shall be unlimited and each member shall be nominated by the Governor of that Province and shall be confirmed by the Senate. If for any reason (illness, death, dismissal) the member is unable to carry on his/ her duties, another senior Judge shall replace him/ her following the same procedures as mentioned above. Only the House shall initiate impeachment proceedings against a Supreme Court Justice and the case shall be tried in the Senate only if the articles of impeachment are approved by four-fifths of the House members. The Supreme Court Justice shall be dismissed from office if 50% plus one members vote to convict.

=== Section 5 ===
The organization of the court system, including district courts, superior courts, trial courts and courts of appeal, and the scope of their jurisdiction shall be determined by the laws and regulations of the Judicial Branch. Judges shall preside over hearings and trials. Judges shall be licensed lawyers and shall be chosen according to their expertise in relevant areas. A judge shall not be temporarily dismissed or relocated absent conviction of criminal or civil charges.

=== Section 6 ===
Double jeopardy shall apply to criminal prosecutions. Trials shall be held in public unless the law requires closed hearings. Court rulings shall be based on the written law and religious, philosophical and ideological doctrines shall not be the basis for any ruling issued by the courts.

=== Section 7 ===
Personal freedom and citizens’ privacy and personal property shall be protected by law from being violated, usurped or confiscated without lawful cause. A search warrant signed by a Judge based on probable cause shall be obtained by the police force before conducting any searches. Moreover, an officer shall recite the defendant's right to remain silent and to an attorney at the time of arrest. A speedy trial and an impartial jury shall be basic rights of the defendant. Warrantless arrests shall be prohibited and there shall be probable cause for an arrest warrant based on evidence beyond mere suspicion. Any kind of confession under duress shall not be admissible against defendants in court.

== Article VII ==
The media shall be free to act within the framework of the law. None of the three branches of government shall allocate a budget for the media as a tool to justify their actions. Government funded media shall only cover factual news about government actions, Congressional representatives, and government agencies, so all people may easily access the details of the negotiations between the Government and Congress. Any form of biased reporting for or against any person or organization in government-funded media shall be strictly prohibited and shall have legal consequences for violators.
