= White torture =

Torture by sensory deprivation

White torture, often referred to as white room torture, is a type of psychological torture technique aimed at complete sensory deprivation and isolation. A prisoner is held in a cell that is devoid of any color besides white; this method of torture is designed to deprive the prisoner of all senses and identity.

It is particularly used in Iran; however, there is also evidence of its use by intelligence services in the United States and Venezuela.

== Methodology ==
Typically, prisoners will become depersonalized by losing personal identity for extended periods of isolation. Other effects can include hallucinations or psychosis.

== Allegations of use ==
=== Iran ===
In Iran, white torture (Persian: شكنجه سفيد) has been practiced on political prisoners by the Islamic republic regime. Most political prisoners who experience this type of torture are journalists held in the Evin prison. According to Hadi Ghaemi, founder of the Center for Human Rights in Iran (CHRI), such tortures in Evin are not necessarily authorized directly by the Iranian government.

It can include prolonged periods of solitary confinement, the use of continual illumination to deprive sleep (listed in the Geneva Convention on Basic Human Rights, 1949), often in detention centers outside the control of the prison authorities, including Section 209 of Evin Prison.

Ahmed Shaheed, the United Nations special human rights rapporteur in Iran, claimed that human rights activist Vahid Asghari was psychologically tortured by means of long-term detention in solitary confinement and with threats to arrest, torture or rape his family members. He was also reportedly tortured with severe beatings for the purpose of eliciting confessions.

A 2004 Amnesty International report documented the use of white torture on Amir Fakhravar by the Revolutionary Guards, the first known example of white torture in Iran. It states that "his cells had no windows, and the walls and his clothes were white. His meals consisted of white rice on white plates. To use the toilet, he had to put a white piece of paper under the door. He was forbidden to speak, and the guards reportedly wore shoes that muffled sound".

In a telephone call to the Human Rights Watch in 2004, the Iranian journalist Ebrahim Nabavi said:

Since I left Evin, I have not been able to sleep without sleeping pills. It is terrible. The loneliness never leaves you, long after you are "free". Every door that is closed on you ... This is why we call it "white torture". They get what they want without having to hit you. They know enough about you to control the information that you get: they can make you believe that the president has resigned, that they have your wife, that someone you trust has told them lies about you. You begin to break. And once you break, they have control. And then you begin to confess.

=== United States ===
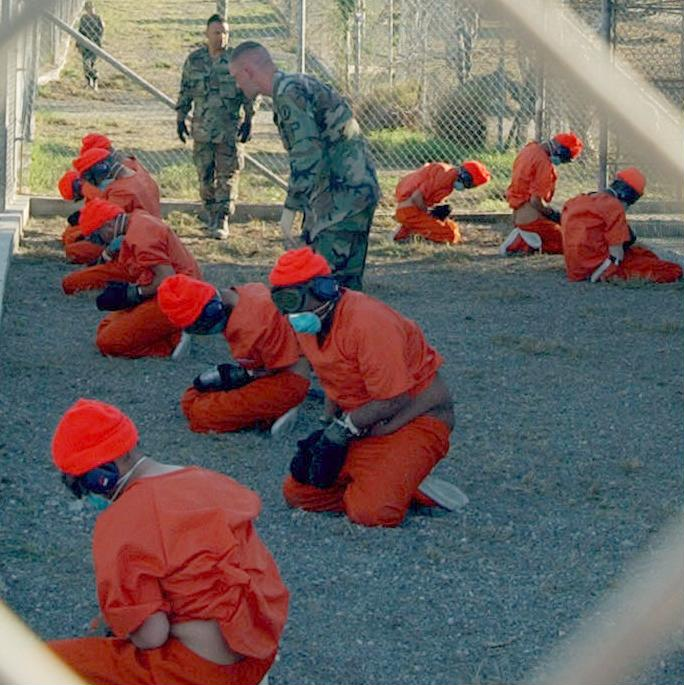
Detainees upon arrival at Camp X-Ray in January 2002, wearing goggles, masks, gloves, and earmuffs.

The United States has held Guantanamo Bay detention camp prisoners under sensory deprivation, with their ears and eyes covered, hands and feet tied, hands in thick gloves, and held in cages without any privacy, always observed under a light that is on day and night. The organization of European Democratic Lawyers (EDL) said that this constitutes white torture and has accused the United States of violating prisoners' fundamental rights. Prisoners are also held in "extreme isolation", confined to windowless cells, going days "without seeing daylight", suffering what Amnesty International and other international human rights organizations have said are torture techniques approved by the George W. Bush administration under the euphemism "enhanced interrogation". Rainer Mausfeld, a researcher in the field of psychology and cognitive science, has criticized the practice.

=== Venezuela ===
According to human rights organizations and other NGOs, the Bolivarian Intelligence Service (SEBIN) of the Venezuelan government holds political prisoners in the lower levels of SEBIN's headquarters, which has been deemed by government officials La Tumba "The Tomb". The cells are two by three meters (6 ft 7 in by 9 ft 10 in) with a cement bed, white walls, and security barriers between one another so that there is no interaction between prisoners. Such conditions have caused prisoners to become very ill, but they are denied medical treatment. Bright lights in the cells are kept on so prisoners lose their sense of time and the temperature is below freezing, with the only sounds heard being from the nearby Caracas Metro trains. Reports of torture in La Tumba, specifically white torture, are also common, with some prisoners attempting to commit suicide. Such conditions according to the NGO Justice and Process are to make prisoners plead guilty to the crimes that they are accused of.

== In media ==
- German artist Gregor Schneider based his room design of "weiße Folter" (lit. 'white torture') on this idea.
- The Brave (TV series) Episode 10 "Desperate Measures" January 8, 2018. A team member is held in an Iranian black site for interrogation. The room is all white, as is her clothing and the guards' clothing and the minimal furniture. The interrogator explains it is intended to cause sensory deprivation, and that bits of color will be added as she begins to cooperate.
- In the 2022 Indian film, Rorschach, the protagonist Luke Antony is subjected to white room torture in Dubai Prison.
