= Arzhang Davoodi =

Iranian activist

- Born: October 10, 1953 (age 73)
- Occupation: teacher Founder of National Iranian Congress
- Known for: democracy activism
- Website: Arzhang Davoodi on X

Arzhang Davoodi (Persian: ارژنگ داوودی; born October 10, 1953) is an Iranian democracy activist, teacher, and author.

== Biography ==
Davoodi was arrested in October 2003 after criticizing human rights conditions in Iran in the documentary Forbidden Iran, particularly the death in custody of Canadian-Iranian photojournalist Zahra Kazemi. He was tried in 2005 by the Islamic Revolutionary Court for "spreading propaganda against the system" and "establishing and directing an organization opposed to the government". The court found him guilty and sentenced him to 15 years' imprisonment and 75 lashes; as of August 2012, the latter part of his sentence had not been implemented. Amnesty International protested the sentence, designating Davoodi a prisoner of conscience.

Davoodi served portions of his sentence in several different prisons, including Evin Prison. In 2005, he joined fellow prisoners Bina Darab-Zand, Hojjat Zamani, Mehrdad Lohrasbi, Farzad Hamidi, and Jaafar Iqdami in a hunger strike to protest their confinement with violent offenders in Rajaii Shahr. Human Rights Watch called the six "political prisoners", "being held for no reason other than their expression of peaceful political views", and urged that they be released.

In August 2012, a new charge of "enmity against God", which carries a possible death sentence, was brought against Davoodi. Amnesty International stated that the charge appeared to be linked to the release by CIS of a recording in which Davoodi called for "freedom and democracy".
