= Francisco Arratia =

Mexican crime journalist and businessman

- Francisco Arratia Saldierna
- Born: 1949?
- Died: 31 August 2004 (age 55); Matamoros, Mexico (near the U.S. border).
- Cause of death: Murder
- Body discovered: Outside the Red Cross, Matamoros, Mexico
- Occupation: Journalist
- Known for: reporting on political corruption, organized crime, and education.

Francisco Arratia Saldierna (1949? – 31 August 2004) was a Mexican journalist and columnist for several Mexican newspapers from Matamoros, Tamaulipas, Mexico. He suffered a heart attack after being badly beaten by a group of men affiliated with the Gulf Cartel, because of his writings about drug trafficking.

Arraita was the third Mexican journalist killed within a six-month period along the US-Mexican border. In 2004, International PEN featured Arratia, as well as the other two, Roberto Javier Mora García and Francisco Ortiz Franco, on its annual Day of the Imprisoned Writer.

On 12 September 2012, the Mexican military captured Jorge Eduardo Costilla Sanchez, a.k.a. "El Coss", a major figure in the Gulf Cartel, who had been linked to Arratia's murder and for whom the United States government had offered a $5 million reward.

== Personal ==
Francisco Arratia Saldierna was 55 years old when he was killed. Besides being an active columnist, Arratia was an entrepreneur who owned a business called Automotriz Amex selling used cars. At one time, he was also a high school teacher.

== Career ==
Francisco Arratia Saldierna was a columnist for an online journal and four regional newspapers around Tamaulipas state. Arratia wrote an online column called "Portavoz" (or Speaker) for "En Línea Directa" in Reynosa and his columns appeared in El Imparcial, El Regional de Matamoros, El Mercurio, and El Cinco.

== Death ==
Mentioned locations within Mexico relative to the capital Mexico City.

Francisco Arratia Saldierna had an argument with a group of men who came to his business 31 August 2004 around 1:30 p.m. The suspects drove a red vehicle. When Arratia left his office about a half an hour later, he was kidnapped by the same group of men.

Arratia was later found outside the Red Cross after being tortured. Arratia had several signs of torture, including broken fingers, burned palms, a fractured skull, spinal damage, and injuries to the chest. After he was beaten by the men, his body was dumped by the attackers. He died at a nearby hospital from a heart attack.

One of the men that was suspected in Arratia's beating was Raúl Castelán Cruz, who allegedly was part of the Los Zetas militant wing that worked for the Gulf Cartel.

== Context ==
Matamoros, Tamaulipas, where Arratia was murdered, is key city in the drug war as it occupies an important trade route between the US and Mexico.

== Impact ==
As a result of the violence directed at journalists writing on the Mexican drug war, journalists had begun to remove their bylines from articles or pull back on coverage of the issue. Mora, Ortiz and Arratia had higher profiles and were targeted and murdered because of their reporting on drug trafficking.

== Reactions ==
More than 200 journalists wrote letters to Mexican President Vicente Fox and asked for the federal government to ensure the safety of journalists.

The International Federation of Journalists called Arratia's murder a "cold and calculated assassination" and called attention to the plight of local journalists who suffer from violence at a higher rate in the training of journalists. In 2003, the International News Safety Institute was founded in an industry-led initiative to train journalists in safety.

== See also ==
- Mexican drug war
- List of journalists killed in Mexico
