= Eli Lake =

American journalist

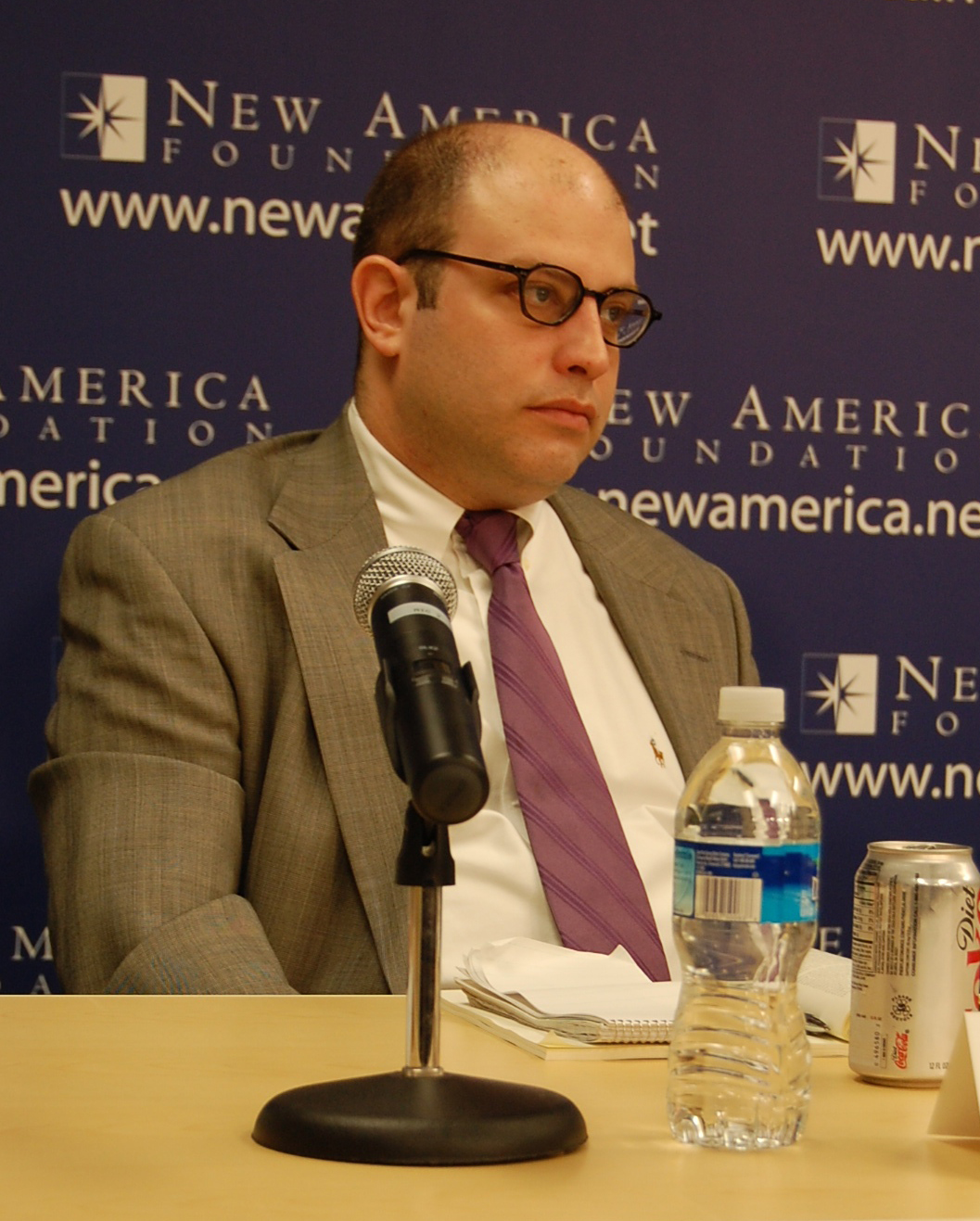
- Eli Lake in 2009
- Born: Eli Jon Lake; 1972 (age 53–54); Philadelphia, Pennsylvania, U.S.
- Occupations: Journalist, podcaster
- Organization: The Free Press

Eli Jon Lake (born 1972) is an American journalist and podcaster who is currently a contributor to The Free Press.

He was previously a former senior national security correspondent for The Daily Beast and Newsweek, and a former columnist for the Bloomberg View. He has also contributed to CNN, Fox, C-SPAN, Charlie Rose, the I Am Rapaport: Stereo Podcast and Bloggingheads.tv.

== Early life and education ==
Lake was born in Philadelphia to a Jewish family and graduated from Trinity College in Hartford, Connecticut, in 1994.

== Career ==
Lake began as a national security reporter at the New York Sun and a State Department correspondent for United Press International (UPI). He was a contributing editor for The New Republic between 2008 and 2013. Lake joined The Daily Beast following The New Republic as Senior National Security Correspondent. Lake, along with his colleague, Josh Rogin, left The Daily Beast in October 2014 and joined Bloomberg View, at which his final column was about American foreign policy with Iran.

Ken Silverstein, one of Lake's primary critics, has claimed his past sources lacked credibility and had been used to manipulate the discourse on national security. Silverstein accused Lake's reporting of supporting the existence of weapons of mass destruction prior to the invasion of Iraq. Silverstein cited an article that Lake had written in 2006 during the war in Iraq.

In 2011, at The Daily Beast, Lake reported that the Obama Administration sold Israel powerful bunker-buster bombs. In 2012, while reporting from Somalia, Lake discovered a local prison that received Somalis captured by the U.S. Navy. Additionally, it was reported that the United Nations documented U.S. violations of an arms embargo in Somalia and its funding of some regional governments there.

In 2011, Silverstein wrote an article for Salon claiming that Lake's reporting on Georgia was biased because pro-Georgian lobbyists had paid for his meals and drinks in the past. This report was disputed by Ben Smith in Politico. Silverstein implied that Lake's relationship with these lobbyists influenced his original report of a bomb blast near the U.S. embassy in Tbilisi. That story was confirmed by The New York Times. Both pieces came to the same conclusion that a Russian military intelligence officer was implicated by Georgian and U.S. authorities in the bombing. Lake has publicly stated he has always paid his tab whenever meeting with Georgian sources.

In August 2013, along with Josh Rogin, Lake reported on a Central Intelligence Agency intercept that claimed that Al Qaeda had a meeting of senior leaders in the form of a conference call. Silverstein criticized their work as misreporting for using the term "conference call" when a later article clarified the call as a remote meeting via internet video, voice conference, and chat. Speculation about the differences in the initial reports ranged from glorification of the National Security Agency's abilities to protection of sources within the U.S. intelligence community.

In March 2017, Lake quoted House Intelligence Committee Chairman Devin Nunes saying that an intelligence officer had shown him intelligence reports that allegedly included inappropriate details about the Trump transition team's communications. Lake later acknowledged that Nunes had "misled" him and that the reports had, in fact, been given to Nunes by a White House staffer, raising questions about whether Nunes's investigation was truly independent of the White House.

Lake's podcast, The Re-Education with Eli Lake, debuted on April 21, 2022.
