= Jamshid Karimov =

Uzbekistani journalist

- Жамшид Каримов
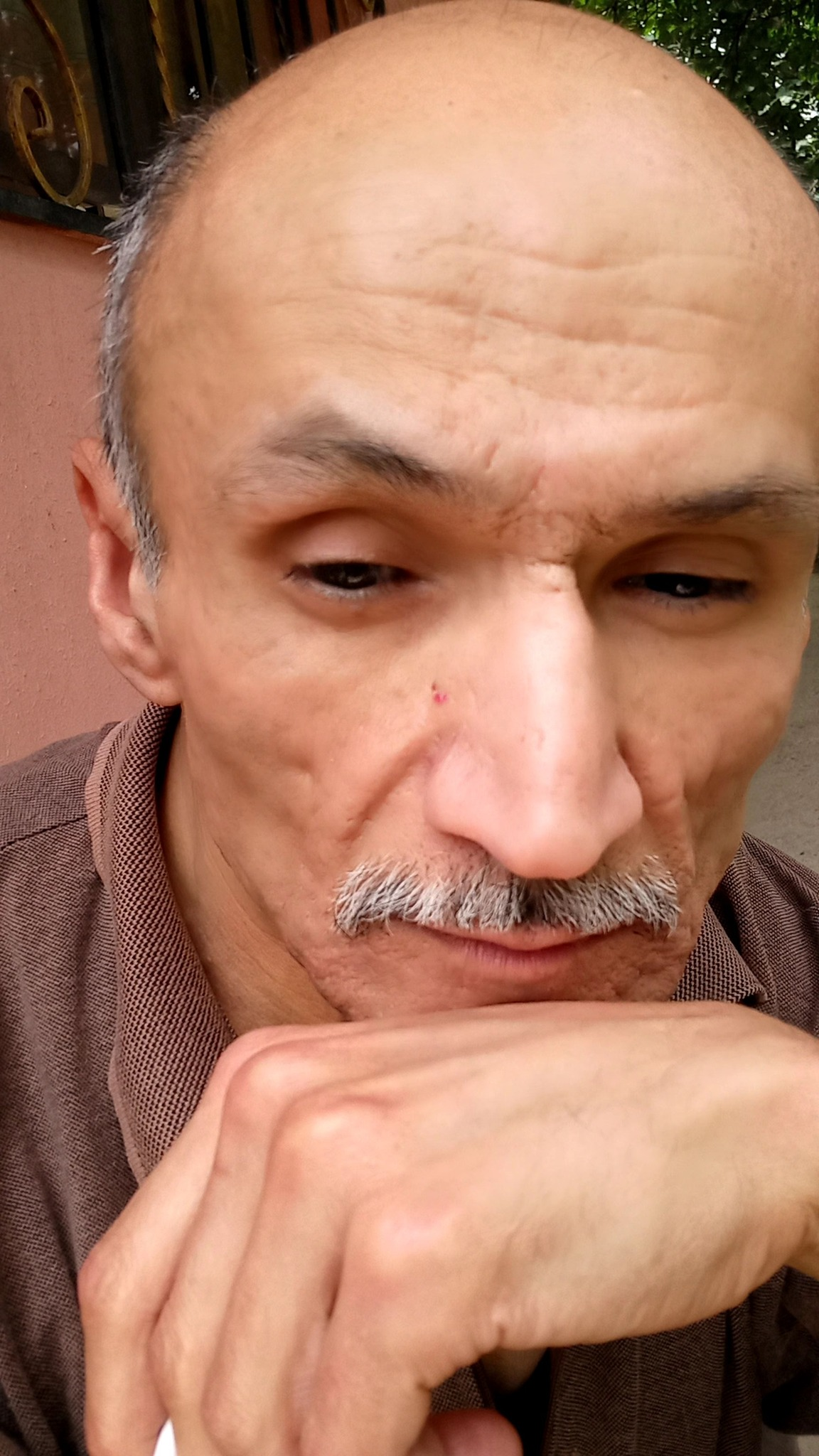
- Джамшид Каримов
- Born: 1967 (age 58–59); Uzbek SSR, USSR
- Disappeared: September 12, 2006 (aged 38–39)
- Occupation: Journalist
- Relatives: Islam Karimov (uncle)

Jamshid Karimov (Uzbek: Жамшид Каримов, Russian: Джамшид Каримов; born 1967) is an investigative journalist in Uzbekistan. He has been a prominent critic of the administration of Islam Karimov, the president of Uzbekistan, who was his uncle. Jamshid Karimov has spent many years in detention.

According to Radio Free Europe, in 2004 Karimov was "beaten up on the streets of Jizzakh ... by unidentified assailants."

== Disappearance and detention, 2006–2011 ==
Karimov went to visit his mother, Margarita, on 12 September 2006. His brother Alisher said he "never returned home." On 14 September Ulugbek Khaidarov, Karimov's friend and fellow journalist, was arrested in Jizzakh on charges of extortion. Khaidarov's sister Nortoji said her brother had been framed.

On 20 September 2006, Marat Khalturdiev, the head of the National Security Service's regional branch, described Karimov's disappearance as "a private affair" and said nothing more. Elin Jonsson, a freelance Swedish journalist who specializes in Central Asian affairs, who knew both Karimov and Khaidarov, said that earlier in the year they had told her they were worried about their safety, and that they were going to try to get a visa for Sweden. Both men were reporting for the website ferghana.ru and the Institute for War and Peace Reporting.

On 22 September, the criminal court in Jizzakh ordered that Karimov be detained for six months of compulsory psychiatric treatment. He was committed to a psychiatric hospital in Samarkand, but for some time his wife was not allowed to visit him.

The Committee to Protect Journalists called on the government to release Karimov and Khaidarov immediately and end harassment of their families. However, over the following years his detention was repeatedly extended, on unknown grounds and without a further court order.

== Release and disappearance, 2012 ==
Karimov was eventually released from hospital around the time of a visit to Tashkent by the US Secretary of State, Hillary Clinton, in October 2011. His health had reportedly been adversely affected by the medication he had received.

In January 2012, Karimov was again reported to have disappeared. His friend Ulugbek Khaidarov reported that on January 10, during a telephone conversation in which Karimov mentioned plans to write a book about his uncle, Islam Karimov, the line went dead. As of May 2012, Jamshid Karimov's whereabouts remained unknown, and campaigning organisations such as Reporters Without Borders suggested that he might be among a dozen Uzbek journalists currently in prison or other forms of detention.

Karimov's name re-appeared in the 2016 census of imprisoned journalists published by the Committee to Protect Journalists after his whereabouts were identified by a reporter of regional news website AsiaTerra. On November 18, 2016, Karimov's daughter told AsiaTerra that the journalist was forcibly returned to a psychiatric ward in January 2012. Karimov's daughter also advised that a beaten Karimov was not given a trial, and was suffering with chronic ailments that has left him in a grave condition.

On March 1, 2017, Karimov was released from the psychiatric facility where he had been held, almost continuously, for 10 years.

== See also ==
- List of kidnappings
- List of solved missing person cases (2000s)
