= Rainer Mausfeld =

German psychologist and university teacher

Rainer Mausfeld (born 22 December 1949 in Iserlohn) is a retired German professor of psychology at Kiel University. He did research on the psychology of perception, cognitive science, and the history of psychology. Since 2015, he has published on manipulation in media and politics and the transformation of representative democracy to neoliberal elite democracy.

== Academic career ==
From 1969 to 1979, Mausfeld studied psychology, mathematics, and philosophy at the Rheinische Friedrich-Wilhelms-Universität Bonn and mathematical psychology at the University of Nijmegen. Subsequently, he was a consultant at the Institute for Test and Talent Research of the Studienstiftung des deutschen Volkes in Bonn until 1981. In 1984, Mausfeld received his doctorate from the University of Bonn with a thesis about Fechner-Scaling. The thesis focuses on the principles of the construction of psychophysical discrimination scales. In 1987, he became visiting research professor at the University of California. In 1990, Mausfeld was resident, or habilitated, in Bonn with research work mainly on perceptual psychology, and in 1992, he accepted a professorship in general psychology at the University of Mannheim. In 1993, he moved to the University of Kiel. Among other projects, Mausfeld was head of the Deutsche Forschungsgemeinschaft (DFG) project Farbkonstanz and, from 1995 to 1996, head of an international research group at the Center for Interdisciplinary Research (ZiF) in Bielefeld. Since 2004, he has been a member of the German Academy of Sciences Leopoldina in its Psychology and Cognitive Science Section. Since 2009, Mausfeld has also published on topics outside psychophysics and perceptual psychology, such as white torture.

== Research topics ==
Mausfeld's research focused on perceptual psychology. He also worked on the theoretical foundations of experimental psychology and the psychology of understanding. He also deals with the rivalry between cognitive psychology and cognitive neuroscience in cognitive science. Another area of interest is the history of ideas in the natural sciences. In contrast to attempts to explain psychological functions on a biological basis, he adopts an antireductionist stance.

=== Color perception ===
Mausfeld argues that, contrary to naïve realism, color perception and other aspects of visual perception do not simply reflect an objective, mind-independent external physical world. Color is a subjective product of an organism's visual system, not an objective property of the physical world. The "measuring instrument" conception of perception—according to which the perceptual system is a kind of measuring device that informs the organism about the physical input—is misguided.

Mausfeld also criticizes the "atomistic" conception of perception, the idea that the perceptual system builds up perceptions—as things referring to the external world—from elementary perceptual variables (like sensations of brightness and color) that are tied to elementary physical variables (like intensity and wavelength of light).

Studying color perception adequately requires studying more than "pure" color (e.g., hue, saturation, and brightness). Fully understanding color perception also requires studying texture, regularities governing the interaction of light with different types of surfaces, the ways in which perceivers internally represent regions of space, and many other factors. The overall context of visual perception is crucial for color perception. Sensation is, according to Mausfeld, always shaped by perception. The senses are part of a complex structure in the mind.

=== White torture and responsibility of science ===
In his work, Mausfeld illustrates the role of psychologists in the development, application, and justification of modern white torture methods. His work states that the goals of these methods are not, as claimed, the extraction of information, but rather breaking the will, disciplining, humiliating, and shaming the victims. Mausfeld uses the example of torture research to define ethical and legal principles and limits of scientific work. He regards the observance of human rights as fully binding.

=== Techniques of managing opinions and emotions ===
==== Features and framework of manipulation techniques ====
The most important feature of manipulative techniques, according to Mausfeld, is that they are invisible. To be effective, they must occur below the threshold of our awareness and take advantage of the "weak points" of our mind. This "opinion management," as Mausfeld puts it, which equals propaganda in the sense of Edward Bernays, is the means the formal democratic order adopts to exercise domination without visible force by creating voluntary consent in the minds of citizens. The techniques aim to make invisible not only facts, but also possibilities of thinking and thus alternative actions (domination of perception). Mausfeld puts his criticism of manipulation techniques within the framework of a fundamental critique of the capitalist economic and social order. Neoliberalism, in his view, has limited and narrowed the understanding of freedom to the choice of one's identity from an "identity basket" (i.e., to the "choice" of a given media-mediated lifestyle).

==== Affective techniques ====
- Among the techniques to manipulate people's emotional lives, Mausfeld counts fear mongering, that is, the generation of fears. Thus, due to the natural inclination of people to the status quo, the fear of change is fueled. To assess the significance of this instrument, Mausfeld refers to the US political scientist John J. Mearsheimer.
- Furthermore, he mentions the creation of the feeling of powerlessness in the population, the feeling of not having control.

==== Cognitive techniques ====
According to Mausfeld, cognitive techniques are more important than affective techniques, because opinions are more stable than emotions. Mausfeld examines the following methods:

- Representation of facts as opinion
- Fragmenting coherent facts so that the context, such as the historical context, is lost
- Decontextualization of facts: The context of the facts is removed, so that the facts become incomprehensible isolated individual cases, which have no general relevance
- Misleading recontextualization: Information is embedded in a foreign context, so that they take on a different character and, for example, no longer lead to outrage in human rights violations.
- Repetition supports the "perceived truth"
- Designing the range of opinions so that the desired seems to be in the middle, which most people strive for, if they are unfamiliar, because they then keep to the middle, seeing it as "neutral and balanced"
- Making facts invisible through media selection, distraction and attention control
- "Meta-propaganda": It is part of every propaganda to claim that the news of the enemy is wrong because it is propaganda

== Private life ==
Mausfeld lives in Danish-Nienhof and is married to the psychologist and psychoanalyst Gisela Bergmann-Mausfeld.

== Bibliography ==
- Mausfeld, Rainer (1985). Grundzüge der Fechner-Skalierung: Prinzipien der Konstruktion psychophysikalischer Diskriminationsskalen [Features of Fechner Scaling: Principles of the Construction of Psychophysical Discrimination Scales] (in German). Frankfurt am Main: Peter Lang. ISBN 978-3-8204-5240-2.
- Mausfeld, Rainer; Niederée, Reinhard (1993). "An Inquiry into Relational Concepts of Colour, Based on Incremental Principles of Colour Coding for Minimal Relational Stimuli". Perception. 22 (4): 427–462. doi:10.1068/p220427. ISSN 0301-0066. PMID 8378133. S2CID 24860763.
- Erdfelder, Edgar; Mausfeld, Rainer; Meiser, Thorsten; Rudinger, Georg (1996). Handbuch Quantitative Methoden [Handbook of Quantitative Methods] (in German). Weinheim: Beltz, Psychologie-Verl.-Union. ISBN 978-3-621-27280-3. Archived from the original on 2019-10-24.
- Heyer, Dieter; Mausfeld, Rainer, eds. (2002). Perception and the Physical World: Psychological and Philosophical Issues in Perception. New York: Wiley. ISBN 978-0-471-49149-1.
- Mausfeld, R. (2002). The physicalistic trap in perception theory. In D. Heyer & R. Mausfeld (Eds.), Perception and the physical world (pp. 75–112). Chichester: Wiley.
- Mausfeld, Rainer; Heyer, Dieter, eds. (2003). Colour Perception: Mind and the Physical World. New York: Oxford University Press. ISBN 978-0-19-850500-6.
- Mausfeld, R. (2003). ‘Colour’ as part of the format of different perceptual primitives: The dual coding of colour: In: R. Mausfeld & D. Heyer (Eds.), Colour perception: Mind and the physical world (pp. 381–429). Oxford: Oxford University Press.
- Mausfeld, Rainer (2005). "Über die Bedingungen der Möglichkeit von Lernen" [On the Conditions for the Possibility of Learning]. In Käsermann, Marie-Louise; Altorfer, Andreas; Foppa, Klaus (eds.). Über Lernen: ein Gedankenaustausch; zum 75. Geburtstag von Klaus Foppa [About Learning: An Exchange of Ideas; on the Occasion of the 75th Birthday of Klaus Foppa] (in German). Bern: EditionSolo. pp. 218–236. ISBN 978-3-9522759-5-5.
- Mausfeld, Rainer (2006). "Wahrnehmungspsychologie: Geschichte und Ansätze" [Perception Psychology: History and Approaches] (PDF). In Funke, Joachim; Frensch, Peter A. (eds.). Handbuch der Allgemeinen Psychologie - Kognition [Handbook of General Psychology - Cognition] (in German). Göttingen: Hogrefe. pp. 97–107. ISBN 978-3-8017-1846-6.
- Mausfeld, R., & Wendt, G. (2006). Material appearances under minimal stimulus conditions: Lustrous and glassy qualities. Perception, 35(Suppl.), 213. doi:10.1068/v060173
- Wendt, G., Faul, F., & Mausfeld, R. (2008). Highlight disparity contributes to the authenticity and strength of perceived glossiness. Journal of Vision, 8, 1–10. doi:10.1167/8.1.14
- Mausfeld, Rainer (2009). "Psychologie, weiße Folter' und die Verantwortlichkeit von Wissenschaftlern" (PDF). Psychologische Rundschau (in German). 60 (4): 229–240. doi:10.1026/0033-3042.60.4.229. Translated as "Psychology, 'White Torture' and the Responsibility of Scientists" (PDF). Translated by Ekrol, Vebjörn.
- Weiße Folter. Psychologie im Krieg gegen den Terror. In: Blätter für deutsche und internationale Politik Band 54, 2009, S. 90–100.
- Foltern ohne Spuren. Psychologie im Dienste des »Kampfes gegen den Terrorismus«. (Volltext). In: Wissenschaft und Frieden Heft 1 (Thema Intellektuelle und Krieg), 2010, S. 16–19.
- Mausfeld, R. (2010a). The perception of material qualities and the internal semantics of the perceptual system. In L. Albertazzi, G. van Tonder, & D. Vishwanath (Eds.), Perception beyond inference. The information content of visual processes (pp. 159–200). Cambridge: MIT Press.
- Mausfeld, R. (2010b). Colour within an internalist framework: The role of ‘colour’ in the structure of the perceptual system. In J. Cohen & M. Matthen (Eds.), Color ontology and color science (pp. 123–148). Cambridge: MIT Press.
- Mausfeld, R. (2011). Intrinsic multiperspectivity. Conceptual forms and the functional architecture of the perceptual system. In W. Welsch, W. J. Singer, & A. Wunder (Eds.), Interdiciplinary anthropology: Continuing evolution of man (pp. 19–54). Berlin: Springer.
- Mausfeld, R. (2012). On some unwarranted tacit assumptions in cognitive neuroscience. Frontiers in Cognition, 3(67), 1–13. doi:10.3389/fpsyg.2012.00067
- Mausfeld, R. (2013). The attribute of realness and the internal organization of perceptual reality. In L. Albertazzi (Ed.), Handbook of experimental phenomenology. Visual perception of shape, space and appearance (pp. 91–118). Chichester: Wiley.
- Mausfeld, Rainer (2015). "Notions such as "Truth" or "Correspondence to the Objective World" Play no Role in Explanatory Accounts of Perception". Psychonomic Bulletin & Review. 22 (6): 1535–1540. doi:10.3758/s13423-014-0763-6. ISSN 1531-5320. PMID 26384991.
- Massenmediale Ideologieproduktion. In: Jens Wernicke: Lügen die Medien? Propaganda, Rudeljournalismus und der Kampf um die öffentliche Meinung. Westend, Frankfurt am Main 2017, S. 134–153.
- Warum schweigen die Lämmer? Wie Elitendemokratie und Neoliberalismus unsere Gesellschaft und unsere Lebensgrundlagen zerstören. (2015) 3. Auflage, Westend, Frankfurt am Main 2018, ISBN 3-86489-225-2 (Volltext online)
