= Forbidden Iran =

- Directed by: Carla Garapedian
- Theme music composer: Michael Ormiston
- Original language: English with Persian subtitles

Production
- Producer: Carla Garapedian
- Cinematography: Jane Kokan
- Editor: Camilla Tress
- Running time: 45 min.

Original release
- Release: 2003

Forbidden Iran is a 2004 Frontline/World documentary film based on Jane Kokan's investigation and report on Zahra Kazemi's murder and opposition movements inside Iran. Kokan travels undercover to Iran in order to investigate the clerical government's crackdown on the Iranian students, journalists and dissidents.

One of the film's interview subjects, Confederation of Iranian Students co-founder Arzhang Davoodi, was subsequently arrested for his criticism of the government in the film as well as assisting in its production. He was tried in 2005 by the Islamic Revolutionary Court for "spreading propaganda against the system" and "establishing and directing an organization opposed to the government". The court found him guilty and sentenced him to 15 years' imprisonment and 75 lashes; as of August 2012, the latter part of his sentence had not been implemented.

A segment from Forbidden Iran was broadcast on Voice of America’s Persian-language program News and Views.
