= Mohammad Seddigh Kaboudvand =

Iranian Kurdish activist and journalist (born 1963)

Mohammad Seddigh Kaboudvand (also spelled Mohammad Sadiq Kabudvand, Kurdish: محەممەد سەدیق کەبوودوەند), born on 22 March 1962 is an Iranian Kurdish activist and journalist. He was the editor of Payam-e Mardom. He is also the founder of the Kurdistan Human Rights Organization HROK (Rêxistina Mafê Mirovan li Kurdistanê in Kurdish).

He was arrested in June 2007 and sentenced to ten or eleven years in prison on charges linked to his human rights work, journalism, and advocacy on behalf of political prisoners. During his imprisonment in Evin Prison, he was held for months in solitary confinement, suffered serious health problems including a stroke and heart attacks, and was reportedly beaten by prison guards before his release in May 2017.

He has received international recognition for his work, including the British Press Award for International Journalist of the Year in 2009 and Human Rights Watch's Hellman/Hammett Award for persecuted writers.

== Early life and family ==
Mohammad Seddigh Kaboudvand was born on 22 March 1962 in Divandarreh, in Sanandaj County, in Eastern Kurdistan. He was the fourth child in his family and has two brothers and three sisters. Kaboudvand spent his childhood and youth in the city of Sanandaj, and at the age of twenty, after marrying, he moved to Tehran, the capital of Iran. He has two sons and one daughter.

== Career ==
In 1996, he founded "Unity for Democracy", a movement that sought to advance democracy in Iranian Kurdish society and published an internal bulletin, The Voice of Freedom, which was forced to shut down after a year.

In 2003, after a five-year effort to secure official permission, he launched the Persian and Kurdish weekly Payam-e mardom-e Kurdistan ("The Messenger of the People of Kurdistan") and served as its editor in chief until the Sanandaj court suspended it on 27 June 2004 on accusations of promoting separatist ideas and publishing false news, according to Reporters Without Borders. At the same time, he and three other journalists were threatened with arrest on charges of disturbing public opinion and promoting separatist ideas.

In April 2005, Kaboudvand founded the Human Rights Organization of Kurdistan (HROK). HROK had about 100 members. Despite a long-running application, the authorities never recognized it officially as a non-governmental organization. Its stated aims included defending fundamental rights such as those affirmed in the Universal Declaration of Human Rights and international conventions, promoting knowledge of and respect for human rights in Kurdistan, and fostering friendly relations among the peoples of Iran on the basis of legal equality. HROK was later declared illegal. Until his arrest in 2007, Kaboudvand was actively involved in documenting and reporting human rights violations in Kurdistan. His organization issued 250 reports and interviews.

He had also sought to publish several books, including one on the situation of women, but none received approval from the censors. He had also written a doctoral thesis on the position of minorities in Turkey.

== Detention ==
Kaboudvand he was taken into custody in June 2007. Charges were brought against him for “acting against national security through HROK,” “widespread propaganda against the system by disseminating news,” “opposing Islamic penal laws by publicizing punishments such as stoning and executions,” and “advocating on behalf of political prisoners.”

He was sentenced to ten or eleven years in prison. Kaboudvand was then held in solitary confinement for five months in Sections 209 and 240 of Evin Prison. Prison guards informed their superiors that he was experiencing mental and physical health problems, "without adequate medical care despite reportedly suffering from serious health problems." His condition deteriorated further, and in April 2008 he had a stroke and was taken to a specialist for treatment. He experienced two heart attacks and also had high blood pressure, along with neurological and prostate problems.

In October 2008, his 11-year prison sentence was upheld by an Iranian appeals court.

In January 2012, Kaboudavand's son Pejman became seriously ill with an undiagnosed kidney condition. Despite repeated requests, Kaboudavand was allowed only one two-hour visit to his son's hospital room in February. On 26 May 2012, Kaboudavand began a hunger strike to protest the refusal of authorities to allow him to visit Pejman more regularly. In December 2012, he was briefly released on bail to visit his son after a hunger strike led to his hospitalization. Press reports said that he went back to prison four days later.

Security forces told Kaboudvand in 2013 that they might bring new charges over letters he was said to have sent to senior officials urging respect for human rights. No such charges had been filed by late 2014.

In April 2014, Kaboudvand was reportedly beaten by prison guards and security agents during a raid on Ward 350 of Evin Prison and was then held for several days in solitary confinement despite his injuries. According to his family, he suffered broken ribs and toes, kidney bleeding, and other injuries, but did not receive adequate medical care.

Kaboudvand was released on 12 May 2017 after ten years' incarceration in Tehran's Evin Prison.

== After detention ==
In 2019, two years after his release, Kaboudvand wrote on Twitter that pressure on him and his family was continuing. He said that after ten years in prison, his family had been left economically devastated and that he remained deprived of social, civil, and professional rights, adding that he had also been placed on a no-fly list.

== Awards ==
Kaboudavand was a highlighted writer for the 2008 observances of the Day of the Imprisoned Writer. Amnesty International designated him a prisoner of conscience, "held solely for his human rights work and the peaceful expression of his views".

In 2009, Kaboudvand received the International Journalist of the Year award at the British Press Awards and was also given Human Rights Watch's Hellman/Hammett Award for persecuted writers.

In December 2014, he received an award from the International Center for Human Rights in recognition of his work defending the rights of Kurds in Iran and neighbouring countries.
