= Vahid Asghari =

Iranian technology student

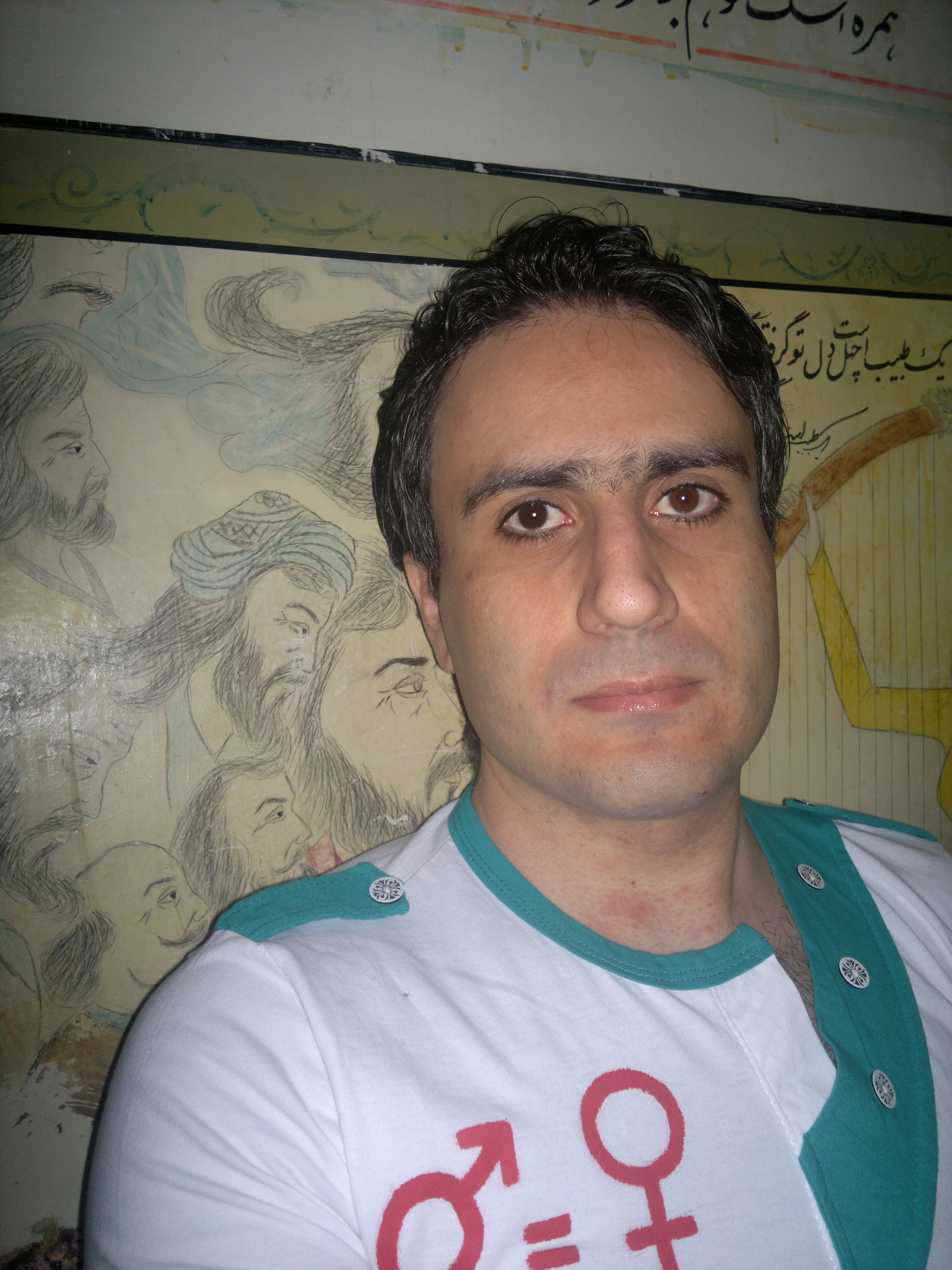
- Asghari in 2009
- Born: 3 April 1986 (age 40); Tehran, Iran
- Occupation: Journalist
- Known for: Political prisoner, human rights activist, women's rights activist

Vahid Asghari (Persian: وحید اصغری) is an Iranian political prisoner, advocate for freedom of expression and a women’s rights activist. He was detained by a group of Islamic Republic Guards Corps (IRGC) commandos on May 8 2008 on his way to the Imam Khomeini International Airport because of his human rights activities and held in solitary confinement for two years without trial. He was sentenced to death twice, in 2011 and 2012, by the chairman of the 15th Chamber of the Islamic Revolutionary Court, Judge Abolqassem Salavati, without participating in the court proceedings and without the freedom to choose his own lawyer. International human rights organizations are following Asghari’s case as he remains in custody.

== Early life ==
Both verdicts were canceled by the Supreme Court of Iran in December 2014 on the basis that the death penalty verdict was invalid and the libel accusation false. The chairman of the 28th Chamber of the Islamic Revolutionary Court, Mohammad Mogheyseh, sentenced him to 18 years of imprisonment on December 7, 2014. He received a final verdict after being held in temporary detention for several years. He was released in April 2016.

He was accused of disseminating propaganda against the Iranian regime; libel; management of the Shabtaz Human Rights News Agency; the creation of a dissident website; support for dissident websites; the provision of financial and technical support to anti-regime websites; the creation of a national plan against censorship by the government; the provision of communication and technical assistance to the Persian BBC; the administration of more than 200 opposition websites; the establishment of an international campaign to promote gender equality; and online training for the Color Revolution of Iran. He calls the whole human rights activities off the punishment and he requested his unconditional release.

== Journalism activities and writings ==
This web journalist, in addition to his position as editor of Shabtaz news agency, Cinema, an English-language news website, and political news websites critical of the Iranian regime, has been tried as a journalist, with journalism related indictments like Roorback, writing articles, and writing articles against Gender inequality in Iran.

Authorities also opened two new cases against him with the accusations of women's rights activities and defending freedom of expression. His other journalistic activities include online training for the Color Revolution by writing subversive articles; editorial support for and management of human rights news agencies; establishing anti-revolutionary news websites; and creating an online database of world newspapers by country.

== Activity from inside Prison ==
This defender of freedom of speech was summoned to the 2nd Chamber of the Evin Prison Security Court, where they opened a new case against him. The total number of cases opened against him because of his statements and activities - like a letter to Ahmed Shaheed the UN special rapporteur on Iran, publishing systematic torture details and establishing a gender equality development campaign from inside the prison - is 5 cases.

He issued statements on defending freedom of expression from ward 350 of Evin Prison and was a co-founder of the fight for unconditional adoption of the Universal Declaration of Human Rights as law by Iran. One of his human rights statements is for World Food Day: he called for the participation and co-operation of every member of the UN's World Food Programme to eliminate poverty.

As a women’s rights activist, he established the Women's Rights section of a news agency for the first time in the Persian media before his arrest. He continually showed his concern about the condition of women in Iran, and raised awareness about the need for more open woman's rights activism in the country; he also demanded that the police of Iran not intervene in mandatory veiling and respect the freedom of choice of clothing of Iranian women. He issued a statement on the International Day for the Elimination of Violence against Women. The Islamic court thus summoned him and opened a case against him for establishing and running the International Campaign for the Promotion of Gender Equality.

He has sued the IRGC media Fars News because of the lies, libel and false accusations they made against him, as well as the Islamic Republic of Iran Broadcasting (IRIB) for TV interviews under torture. He repeatedly refused to appear in Islamic court for denying his basic human rights and for the torture he has suffered at the hands of the state (among other reasons).

== Torture and TV interviews under duress ==
Vahid Asghari sustained psychological and bodily injury during his detention. He was also forced to make a self-confession on TV. These confessions aired despite the fact that he wasn't charged with or convicted of any of the allegations, which were later rejected by the Courts and himself.

He experienced and faced taser guns, batons, whips, pepper spray, tear gas, cable wire, noose, foot canes, nail-removers, a yoke, knuckle dusters, knife and karambit, a blade that was held to his throat and wrists, handcuffs and shackles, and even a loaded Colt that was held to his head to force him to confess to crimes he didn’t commit. His lawsuit against IRGC military interrogators and judges has not received any answers from the military court, media court, or judges' court.

Ahmed Shaheed, the UN special human rights rapporteur on human rights in Iran, wrote in his report to the UN that Vahid Asghari has been tortured into confession. In January 2013, Asghari wrote a letter to Ahmed Shaheed and explained his situation. But in punishment for writing the letter, he was denied visitation rights for a long period of time, and a new case was opened against him. Reporters Without Borders reported that confessions obtained by torture will be used in court against Vahid Asghari and that his only crime is supporting opposition websites. Reporters Without Borders consequently demanded his unconditional release.

=== Letter to the judge ===
Vahid Asghari fully explained his tortures and the pressure on him in a letter to Judge of the 15th Branch of the Islamic Revolutionary Court on December 17, 2009. He wrote:

I was beaten with a stick for hours and hours while blindfolded and handcuffed. With a knife against my throat, I was threatened with death and rape. I and my family were insulted. I was forced to make a confession and sign it. They then videoed my confession and broadcast the video with the national television station’s complicity although I was legally presumed to be innocent.

=== Illnesses and injuries ===
Vahid Asghari suffered from ear infections and a broken nose. He was brutally and frequently beaten during an investigation in the prison. He developed carpal tunnel syndrome and had his teeth broken during a violent raid in political ward 350 by Iranian security servicemen on 17 April 2014. Despite needing specialized medical treatment, the government did not respond to his requests.

== Hunger strike and family visitation strike ==
Vahid Asghari was transported to solitary confinement in ward 240, from political ward 350 of Evin Prison, for ten days, and was banned from family visitations for 3 weeks after he refused to appear in Islamic Revolutionary Court and the judge define it as a disobligation of his orders.

He opposed the new order too by going on hunger strike for ten whole days. Some of his fellow inmates in the political ward of 350 of Evin Prison joined him to show their solidarity and support this human rights activist.

About 100 Iranian security servicemen stormed the prison on April 17, 2014, and Vahid Asghari was seriously injured. He sued Evin Prison authorities and went on a hunger strike.

He went on a family visitation strike along 34 more political inmates while he protested the Evin authorities intervention in domestic affairs of political ward of 350 and taking their inmate friends into the solitary confinement.

== Death sentence and global reactions ==
Reporters Without the Borders, the Ministers of Foreign Affairs for the United States, United Kingdom, and France, and the High Representative of the Europe Union for Foreign Affairs, Catherine Ashton, demanded the immediate, unconditional release of Vahid Asghari. Reza Pahlavi, son of the last king of Iran, issued a statement also requesting his unconditional release; moreover, he created an alliance to work on Vahid Asghari and some other political prisoners’ cases.

Defending Human Rights in Iran Federation, Iranians in France Association Union, Speech and Democracy Association, Citizens of Iran Anti-Oppression Committee, and the Committee for the Defence of Human Rights in Iran, issued a joint statement at the end of a protest in the Paris Square of human rights, demanding the release of Vahid Asghari and other political prisoners.

Amnesty International issued a statement, writing that Vahid Asghari, who had hosted websites critical of the government, was sentenced to death after conviction in an unfair trial.

== Campaigns in support ==
Front Line Defenders Foundation, an organization for human rights defenders at risk, which is located in Europe, aired concerns in July 2015 about Vahid Asghar i's ongoing detention and demanded his urgent and unconditional release:

Human rights defender Mr. Vahid Asghari has been in ‘temporary detention’ since 8 May 2008, when he was abducted by Islamic Republic Guard Corps (IRGC) commandos whilst traveling to Tehran Imam Khomeini International Airport.

Vahid Asghari is a women's human rights defender who has provided free online support and domains for human rights defenders and organizations in Iran.

The IRGC commandos demanded that the human rights defender make a confession. When he refused he was transported to an apartment owned by the Iranian secret service. One commando loaded a Colt and put it to Vahid Asghari's head, as a way to terrorize him into confessing. He was additionally beaten for three days.

The previous verdicts issued by the cleric judges at the Revolutionary Court have been canceled and there has thus far not been a final verdict against Vahid Asghari. The human rights defender had been sentenced to death twice by the 15th Chamber of the Revolutionary Court. However, the Supreme Court of Iran overruled these verdicts in December 2014 on the basis that the death penalty verdict was invalid and the libel accusation false. The commutation of his death sentence to 18 years imprisonment also remains unconfirmed.

Front Line Defenders is deeply concerned at the ongoing detention of Vahid Asghari, which it believes to be solely motivated by his work in defense of human rights.

This human rights defender's protector also established an Email to Hassan Rouhani, the president of Iran, to request Vahid Asghari’s unconditional release from the Islamic Republic government. William Gomez a human rights activist and journalist published a letter to Rouhani, demanding the release of Vahid Asghari and guarantees of human rights activists’ freedom and security in Iran. Human Rights Defending Association for Iran also demanded the unconditional release of this women's rights defender.

On August 13, 2014, he moved from political ward 350 of Evin Prison to the political ward of Rajaei Shahr Prison near Tehran, a move that is allegedly used for punishing political prisoners that disobey prison authorities and the judiciary. Asghar's case was followed by international human rights organizations, and there was a petition online calling for his release.

== See also ==
- Human rights in Iran
- Internet censorship in Iran
- White torture
- Evin Prison
- Iranian women's movement
- Death penalty
- Shirin Ebadi
- Nasrin Sotoudeh
