= European Democratic Lawyers =

European Democratic Lawyers (EDL-AED) (also Avocats Européens Démocrates, A.E.D) is an association of labor unions and lawyers of six European countries. It was founded in October 1987 as a confederation of lawyers' unions and gained its statutes adopted in Strasbourg, France on April 21, 1990 and was registered as an association at the Register of Associations of the Magistrates' Court of Colmar, France on July 4, 1990. The aim of the association is defending the rights of citizens by preserving the independence of lawyers with regard to any power, be it political, social, economic or ordinal.

== France ==
The French Lawyers' Union (SAF) is the founding member of the EDL-AED (Avocats Européens Démocrates). The goal is to defend human rights and the values of the SAF, as well as to establish a more democratic and humane legal system in Europe.

== Germany ==
The RAV (Lawyers for Democracy and Human Rights) is a founding member of the umbrella organization European Democratic Lawyers (EDL/AED). It has been committed to protect fundamental rights and freedoms and, moreover, in influencing legal developments in these areas at national and European levels.

== Netherlands ==
The Dutch designation for the association is "Europese Democratische Advocaten" (EDA). The Association of Social Lawyers of Netherlands (VSAN) is the EDL-AED member responsible to provides support and protects defenders of the law, particularly where they are at risk of being marginalized. It contributes to the introduction and maintenance of modern, humane, and democratic European law in the country.

== Spain ==
The Free Association of Lawyers (Asociación Libre de Abogados, ALA) is a founding member of the EDL-AED in Spain. The main goal is to defend democratic ideals and human rights while maintaining the independence of the legal profession.

== Member organizations ==
The member organizations allied in this association are:

- Le Syndicat des Avocats de France (S.A.F.) (France)
- La Confederazione Nazionale Delle Associazioni Sindicali Forensi d 'Italia (Italy)
- Der Republikanische Anwältinnen und Anwälteverein (RAV - Germany)
- L'Associació Catalana per a la Defensa dels Drets Humans (A.C.D.D.H- Catalonia)
- De Vereniging Sociale Advokatuur Nederland (VSAN - Netherlands)
- Le Syndicat des Avocats pour la Démocratie (S.A D. - Belgium)
- La Asociación Libre de Abogados (ALA - Madrid, Spain)
- Euskal Herriko Abokatuen Elkartea (ESKUBIDEAK - Basque Country)
- L'Iniziativa Democratica Forense (I.D.F.- Italy)
- Legal Team Italia ( L.T.I. - Italy)

The EDL was present at the 33rd G8 summit in Germany in 2007.
