= Roya Toloui =

Kurdish journalist (born 1966)

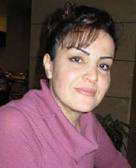
Roya Toloui

Roya Toloui (Kurdish: رۆیا توولۆیی, romanized: Roya Tûloyî; born May 22, 1966, in Baneh, Kurdistan province, Iran) is a prominent Kurdish-Iranian journalist, human rights activist and feminist She was born in Baneh in western Iran. She received her high school diploma at Baneh and her PhD in pathology from University of Mashad. Since 2006, she has lived in the United States.

== Life ==
She was the editor-in-chief of Rassan (Rising up), a Kurdish monthly magazine about women's issues. Three issues of the magazine were published in Sanandaj in spring and summer of 2005 until it was closed down in the summer of 2005 by the Iranian judiciary. She is the founder of the Association of the Kurdish Women Supporting Peace in Kurdistan. She is also a member of the Kurdish PEN.

Due to her outspoken criticism of authorities as well as defense of the rights of Kurdish and Iranian women, she was tried in a Revolutionary Court in April 2005 and was accused of endangering national security.

Following demonstrations in Kurdish inhabited areas of western Iran, including protests after the killing of Shivan Qaderi, she was arrested on 2 August 2005, and held in prison for 66 days until freed on bail in October 2005. She said that during her arrest she was kept in solitary confinement and subjected to torture. She gave false confessions after being threatened that her children would be brought to the prison and burned to death. Her case of imprisonment was highlighted in the International PEN's Day of the Imprisoned Writer in November 2005. After her release, she fled Iran for Turkey and finally she sought refuge in the United States in April 2006. In 2006, she received the Oxfam Novib/PEN Award.

In May 2007, Toloui was sentenced in her absence by the Iranian court to five years in prison for attending two peaceful protests in 2005 and one year for propaganda against the system.

In the U.S., Toloui worked for a time in Washington as a broadcaster for Radio Farda, a Persian-language radio station funded by the United States government. She said she left Radio Farda by the end of 2007 after Iranian security services began threatening her husband and relatives in Iran, and started working as a technician at a lab in Virginia.

In 2009, Toloui co-authored a chapter on repression and nonviolent resistance in the Iranian women’s movement in the edited volume Civilian Jihad: Nonviolent Struggle, Democratization, and Governance in the Middle East.
