= Barzani (surname) =

Barzani (Kurdish: بارزانی) is a surname. Notable people with the surname include:

- Adham Barzani (born 1962), Iraqi Kurdish politician
- Ahmed Barzani (1896–1969), head of the Barzani tribe in Northern Iraq
- Asenath Barzani (1590–1670), Jewish Iraqi writer
- Ayoub Barzani, Kurdish Iraqi writer and critic
- Idris Barzani (1944–1987), first Kurd to ever fly a plane
- Massoud Barzani (born 1946), leader of the Kurdistan Democratic Party, President of Iraqi Kurdistan 2005–2017, son of Mustafa Barzani
- Masrour Barzani (born 1969), son of Masoud Barzani, member of the Kurdistan Democratic Party leadership
- Moshe Barazani or Barzani (1926–1947), Jewish Kurdish member of Lehi (the "Stern Gang")
- Mustafa Barzani (1903–1979), leader and founder of the Kurdistan Democratic Party 1946–1979
- Nechirvan Barzani (born 1966), (Prime Minister of Iraqi Kurdistan) 2012–present, nephew of Mustafa Barzani
- Sirwan Barzani, Kurdish businessman and military commander
- Ubaidullah Barzani (1927–1980) was a Minister of State in the Iraqi government in 1974 to 1980

== See also ==
- Barzani (disambiguation)
