= Mobitel (Iraq-Kurdistan) =

Mobitel Iraq is a mobile operator based in Erbil. Founded in 2006 by Iraqi and Lebanese investors, it was the only 3G licensee in Iraq until January 2015. Later, it had about 2.5 million subscribers.

== History ==
A group of Iraqi and Lebanese investors founded Mobitel Iraq in 2006, and it was licensed by the Kurdistan Regional Government to provide 2G and 3G service in three governorates. The company decided to offer 3G as it was its way to compete in a market that already had several 2G operators. It also said that its investors had confidence in the economic and security situation in the region.

By July 2007, a trial service was running in Erbil Governorate and Duhok Governorate. The company said it sold more than 40,000 lines in two months and that it planned to expand across the north of Iraq, and then spread to the rest of the country once it received approval from the central government in Baghdad.

In 2008, its headquarters were in Pirmam, with offices in Erbil and Duhok.

In 2012, the International Telecommunication Union described Mobitel Iraq as a regional operator working only in the Kurdistan Region, and as the country's sole 3G operator. It also noted that most Iraqis had no access to 3G.

It later built up a subscriber base of about 2.5 million, including an estimated 400,000 3G users.

== Services ==
At launch, Mobitel offered basic 3G services such as video calling, MMS, and HSDPA, and mainly used Huawei equipment, with some from Ericsson. The price of a line was US$25, but it was sold for more than double on the black market. It also offered conference calls with up to 5 people and sending credit to another subscriber using USSD.

Mobitel also sold a wireless camera that could be watched live from a 3G phone.

Reuters reported in 2011 that people in Erbil could use Mobitel's 3G phones.

== See also ==
- Asiacell
- Korek
- Telephone numbers in Iraq
