= Battle of Mount Handrin =

1966 battle during the First Iraqi Kurdish War

- Part of First Iraqi–Kurdish War
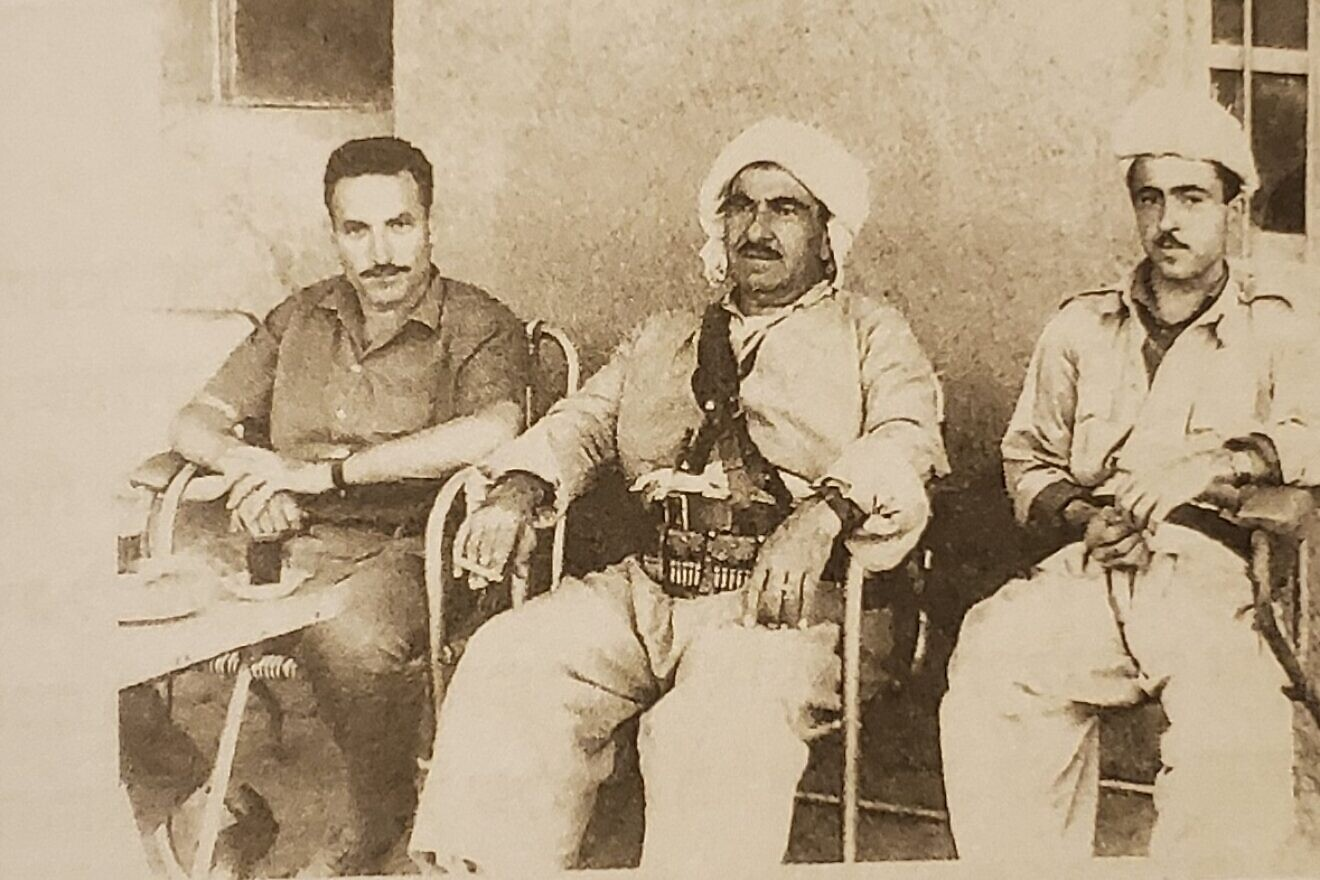
- Left to right: Tsuri Sagi, Mustafa Barzani, and Idris Barzani after the battle
Date	11-12 May 1966
Location	Iraqi Kurdistan, Rawanduz
Result	Kurdish victory

Belligerents
(Kurdistan Region) Peshmerga; Al-Ansar	Iraq; Jash forces

Commanders and leaders
Mustafa Barzani (Israel) Tsuri Sagi; Idris Barzani	Abdul Aziz al-Uqaili

Units involved
Unknown	4th and 2nd Brigade

Strength
1,000 soldiers (according to Tsuri Sagi); 250 Communist partisans	5,000 soldiers in one brigade

Casualties and losses
Less than 20 killed 3 killed (according to Iraqi Communist Party)	1,000-3,000 killed (Note: The death-toll number varies; 1,000 according to Mustafa Barzani, 1,400-2,000 2,000 3,000,3,000 according to Uri Sagi); Entire 4th Brigade killed

The Battle of Mount Handrin or the Mount Handrin ambush, took place on 11-12 May 1966, in Rawandiz, Iraqi Kurdistan and the Iranian border. During the First Iraqi-Kurdish war between Peshmerga forces and the Iraqi Army supported by Jash forces. The Communist Ansar movement also joined the battle supporting the Kurds. The Iraqi forces were defeated and the entire 1966 Iraqi offensive was brought to a halt. After several weeks of talks, the Iraqi Prime Minister announced a “Twelve-Point Plan,” which addressed a number of Kurdish demands and was accepted by Barzani. It was one of the most significant defeat suffered by Iraqi forces.

== Background ==
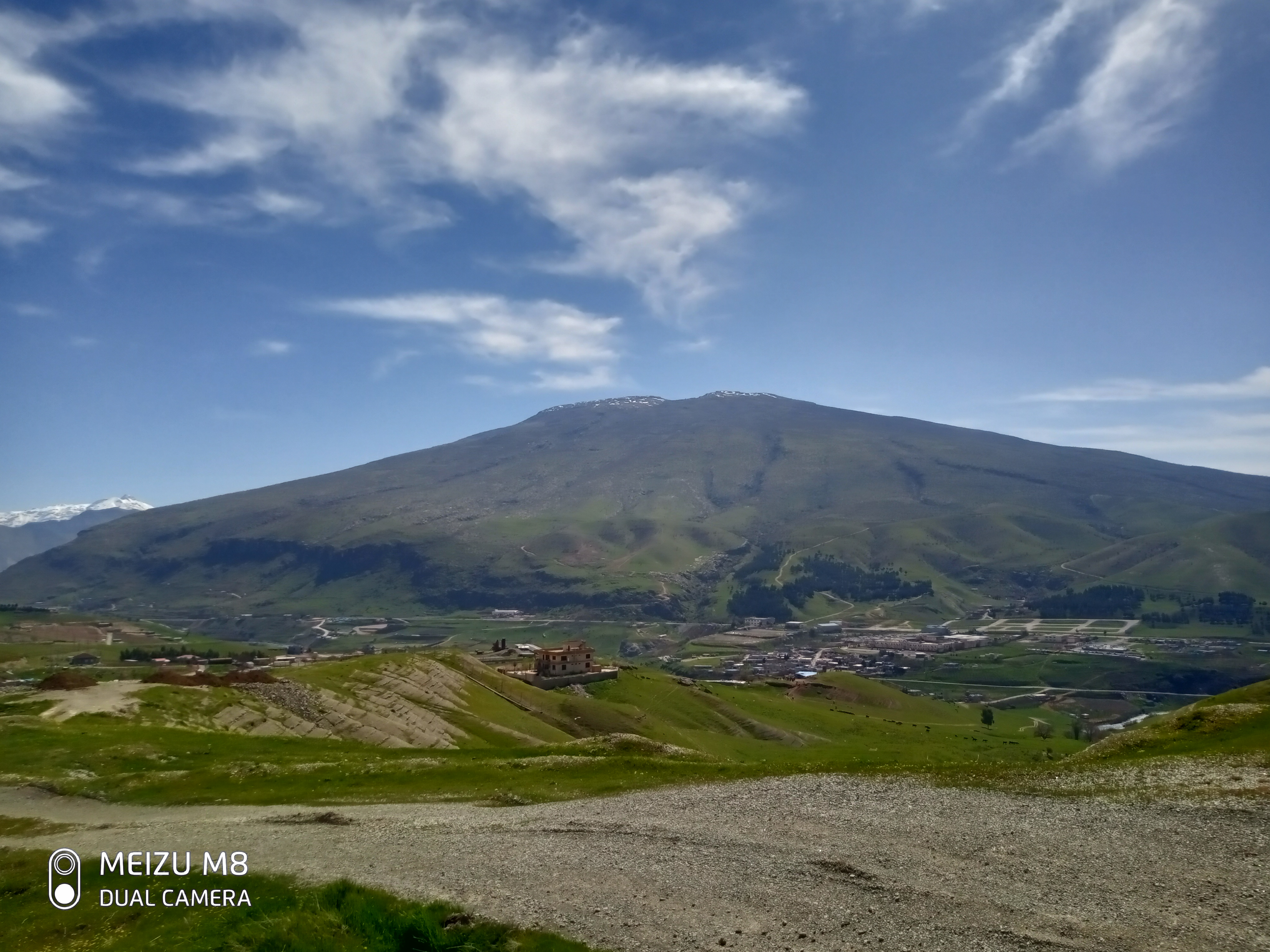
Mount Handrin in 2021

In April 1966, Iraqi President Abdul Salam Arif was killed in a helicopter crash, after which his brother, Abdul Rahman Arif, took power. Following this transition, the Iraqi government resumed military action against Kurdish forces led by Mullah Mustafa Barzani. Iraq launched an offensive against the Kurds, deploying more than 40,000 troops and 100 aircraft. Iraqi forces initially captured the Rawandiz Gorge. Iraqi forces initially occupied Mount Handrin on 2 May 1966. A communist partisan detachment was stationed on Mount Handrin when Iraqi government troops occupied the surrounding heights. They joined the Peshmerga Kurds in launching a counterattack. Captain Kamal Naaman, was the communist forces military commander. The account estimates that the armed communist force numbered around 250 men, equipped mainly with basic rifles and two mortars, while government forces numbered more than 2,000 and had artillery and air support.

The Iraqi units on Mount Handrin were commanded by Abdul Aziz al-Uqaili.

After several days of fighting the Kurdish defense positions began to collapse. An ammunition convoy from Iran took the wrong route and never arrived. Things looked bad for the Kurdish forces. Due to this the IDF commander Sagi received an order from Israel to return home, although he refused it.

== Battle ==
The Iraqi force’s initially made progress, securing the Rawanduz Gorge and advancing to capture Mount Handrin and Mount Zozik. However, Iraqi forces established their camp in the valley between the two mountains while leaving the surrounding high ground undefended. Barzani took advantage of this and quickly moved his forces to Mount Handrin. In the early hours, Sagi ordered a group of Peshmerga holding the front line to carry out a tactical withdrawal, leaving a gap in the lines. Iraqi forces advanced through the opening, believing they had achieved a breakthrough. However, they did not secure the surrounding high ground, where Kurdish fighters had taken concealed positions. Kurdish forces then launched an attack from the heights above, striking several Iraqi battalions.

In over two days of fighting, Iraqi forces suffered heavy casualties. Those who retreated left behind heavy equipment and withdrew over the mountains. Some units surrendered, while others deserted after reaching safety. The 5,000-man Iraqi brigade was wiped out. Mr. Sagi recalls Iraqi officers driving up in two jeeps waving white flags to surrender. The attack involved the use of mortars and artillery. With soldiers fleeing their positions. And many soldiers deserting, including some who defected to the Kurdish side.

Iranian sources also claimed that several Iraqi MiG aircraft had been driven back by Iranian anti-aircraft fire, after violating Iranian air space. Some witnesses claimed to have seen an Iraqi aircraft shot down by the Kurds, but there was no confirmation of this.

The battle came to an end when Iraqi emissaries subsequently arrived in two jeeps flying white flags to surrender. Several Iraqi army platoons had also surrendered.

The defeat at Mount Handrin brought the entire 1966 Iraqi offensive to a halt. One report stated that while the Iraqi offensive had been called off the Kurds were still mobile, retaining their initiative. It went on to say that in the fighting at Mount Handrin several Iraqi army platoons had surrendered and that both military and civilian hospitals were filled with military casualties.

== Aftermath ==
According to the Iraqi Communist Party, three Peshmerga fighters were killed; Corporal Younis Aziz, Saleh Elias Sufi, and Jalal Haji Ahmed. According to the Iraqi division commander's after-battle report, the Iraqi dead were buried in the nearby town of Diyana (now Soran), with empty 7UP bottles as gravestones. When Mustafa Barzani was told of the scale of the Iraqi losses, he responded to Sagi: “Thirty or forty Iraqi dead, that’s possible. But three thousand dead—now I can never speak to the Iraqi army.” Sagi responded that the Iraqis “got what they deserved for having initiated the attack.” Sagi suggested that the terms might become more favorable if the Kurds destroyed the remaining five brigades, but Barzani rejected this, replying: “Sorry, but I’ve waited a lifetime for them even to deign to speak to me.” Back in Tel Aviv, Israeli military leaders were reportedly skeptical at the scale of the Iraqi casualties. General Aharon Yariv, head of military intelligence, responded: “That’s impossible. It’s a guerrilla war. What are you talking about?”.

The Baghdad authorities rushed out false information, alleging the “rebels had suffered a severe defeat” and that only a few pockets of resistance remained. Barzani at first not seeming to realise the publicity value of his tactical victory. It was not until 21 May that he issued a press release over his new Radio Kurdistan, claiming that “two army units had been surrounded on 11 and 12 May, and had lost 1000 killed” and that he had captured “980 rifles, six guns and large quantities of ammunition”. The defeat deterred Baghdad from engaging in major operations in Northern Iraq for the next two years.

=== Twelve-Point Plan ===
Following the defeat, the Iraqi government moved toward negotiations with Kurdish leadership. After several weeks of talks, the Iraqi Prime Minister announced a “Twelve-Point Plan,” known as the Bazzaz Declaration, on 29 June 1966. The plan addressed a number of Kurdish demands and was accepted by Barzani. However, the Kurdistan Democratic Party’s Sixth Congress indicated that Kurdish leaders would continue to press for autonomy later in 1966. The declaration was also welcomed by the United States. It was not implemented however, due to his overthrow by the Ba’ath Party in 1968.

The agreement included:

1. Recognition of Kurdish national rights
2. Administrative decentralization to give effect to these rights
3. Recognition of Kurdish as an official language
4. Kurdish representation in parliament
5. A Kurdish share of official positions
6. Scholarships for Kurds and the establishment of a university branch in the north
7. Appointment of Kurdish local government officials
8. Recognition of Kurdish political organizations
9. Amnesty for Kurds
10. Return of Kurdish guerrillas to previous posts, with some retained in an approved organization
11. Relief and economic assistance
12. Resettlement of Kurds and others in their traditional locales.

== Legacy ==
An Iraqi unit had not suffered a defeat of this scale by the Kurds until 1995 during the Iraqi Kurdish civil War, When two brigades of the Iraqi 38th Infantry Division were pushed out of the city of Erbil by a large number of Kurdish forces.

“So I planned to trap this brigade on Mount Handrin. I ordered a Kurdish battalion to retreat four kilometers into the mountains. It was not easy to persuade these proud fighters to retreat … but in the end, they obliged. My attacking force of 1,000 men hid in two sideway channels. The Iraqi brigade took the bait and charged forward. It was hit on all sides. In one hour, the 4th Brigade was gone.”

— Tsuri Sagi

On 13 May 2026, members of the Iraqi Communist Party, the Kurdistan Communist Party and veterans’ associations commemorated the 60th anniversary of the Battle of Mount Handrin in Rawanduz district, Erbil Governorate, Iraqi Kurdistan. The ceremony included speeches by party representatives and veterans.

== See also ==
- Iraqi-Kurdish conflict
- Second Iraqi-Kurdish War
