= Mobitel =

Mobitel, an acronym of "mobile telephone", is the name of several mobile telecommunication companies:

- Mobitel (Georgia)
- Mobitel (Iraq-Kurdistan)
- Mobitel (Slovenia)
- SLTMobitel, formerly Mobitel, a Sri Lankan telecommunications company
- Zain Sudan, formerly Mobitel, a Sudanese mobile company
