= Sirwan Barzani =

Kurdish businessman and convicted fraud

Sirwan Barzani Peshmerga General
- سیروان بارزانی
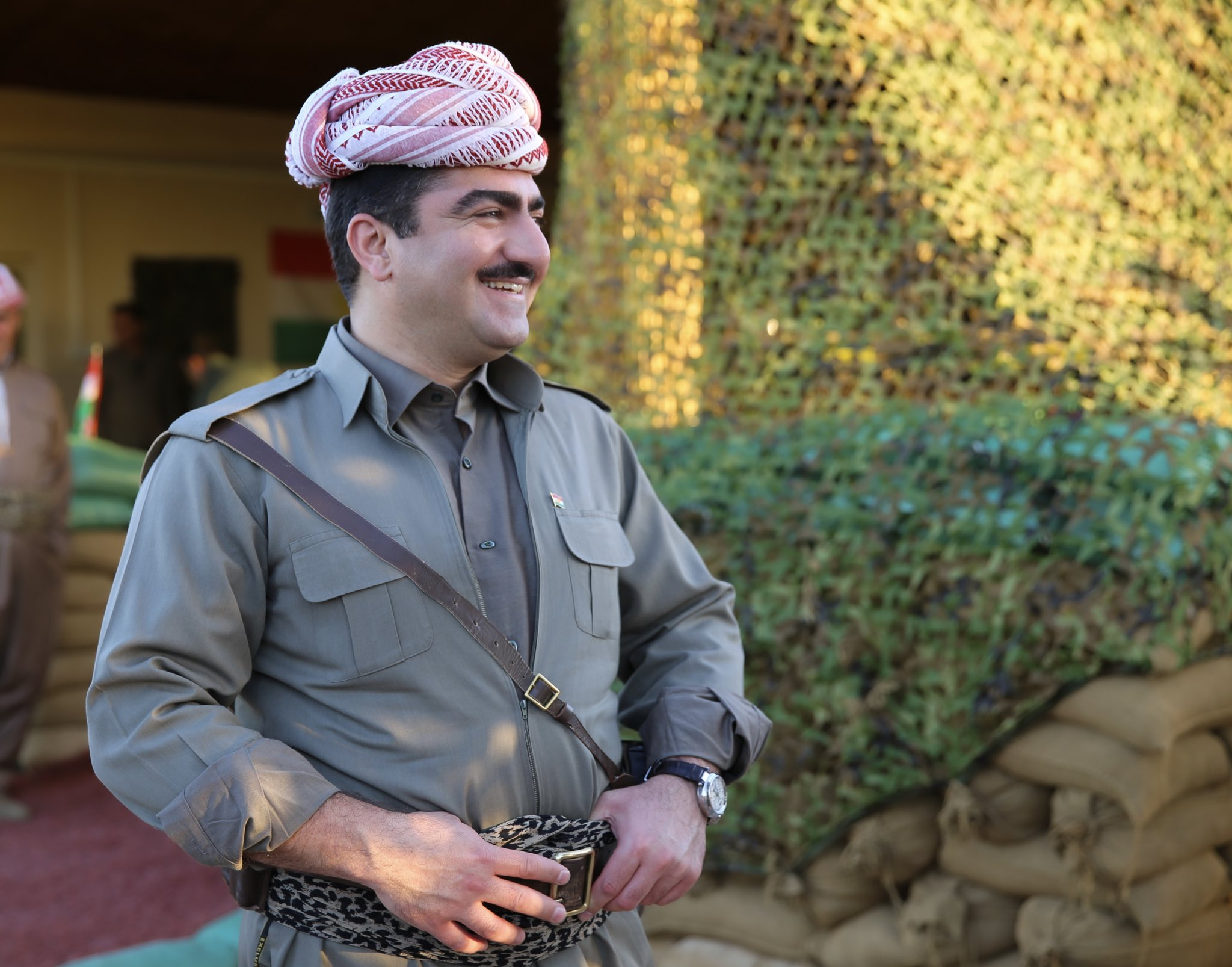
- Sirwan Saber Barzani
- Born: Sirwan Saber Mustafa; March 11, 1970 (age 56); Choman, Iraq
- Citizenship: Iraq
- Education: Zakho Military College (Graduated 1998); Honorary Doctorate in National Security, Cambridge Academy of Science and Technology (2015)
- Occupations: Businessman, Military commander
- Years active: 2000–present
- Employer: Korek Telecom
- Known for: Managing Director of Korek Telecom, Peshmerga Commander
- Title: Managing Director of Korek Telecom
- Political party: Kurdistan Democratic Party
- Relatives: Massoud Barzani (uncle)
- Family: Barzani family
- Instagram Facebook

Sirwan Saber Barzani (born March 11, 1970) is an Iraqi Kurdish businessman and military commander. He is a member of the Kurdish Barzani family. He is the older brother of Saywan Barzani, a Kurdish diplomat.

Sirwan is the nephew of the former President of Iraqi Kurdistan, Masoud Barzani and cousin to the President of Kurdistan, Nechirvan Barzani. He is one of the most famous young generals in the Kurdistan Region's military force in Iraq, called the Kurdish Peshmerga.

== Career ==
=== Korek Telecom ===
Barzani is the managing director of Korek Telecom, a mobile phone operator in Iraq. Korek is one of the oldest telecommunications companies in Iraq, having begun by offering services with Kurdistan and expanded nationwide after receiving a national operating licence in 2007. The company now has seven million subscribers and close to 3,500 towers across Iraq. The estimated worth of the company is $2 billion.

Critics suggest that, as Masoud Barzani's nephew, he has only achieved his wealth through nepotism. Kamal Chomani, a critic of the Kurdistan Regional Government, said that: "He could have supported the Peshmerga through his giant companies, but everyone knows Sirwan Barzani has become a billionaire by using KRG institutions." In response, Barzani has said "This is normal. When people talk bad about you, it means that you are doing good, and I will do more."

In 2011, Barzani was forced to deny that Korek belonged to the KDP, the political party led by his uncle, and revealed that he was one of four shareholders, and that the other three shareholders were "not very well-known" and were "businessmen not affiliated to the KDP". He explained that this was because "we started with a very small business and very small amount of capital."

=== Peshmerga fighter ===
Barzani was a Peshmerga fighter for 12 years, fighting against Saddam Hussein's forces in the mountains of the Kurdistan region.[3] During this time, he earned the nickname "Black Tiger". He was educated at the Zakho Military College, and established the Barzani brigade in 1994. He retired from the army in 2000.

In June 2014, with ISIL threatening the Kurdistan region of Iraq, Barzani's uncle and president, Masoud Barzani, called for all veterans to return to the front lines. Barzani himself was given a senior role in leading the Peshmerga forces. ISIL attacked Kurdistan in August 2014, and Barzani and his men were preparing to leave to take back Sinjar from ISIL on 3 August. However, on 6 August, Erbil, the capital of the Kurdistan region, came under threat from ISIL fighters, so Barzani took 150 men to the city and pushed their forces back to Gwer by 10 August, aided by US-led air strikes.

In January 2015, ISIL carried out a surprise attack on the Peshmerga at Gwer, killing 26 and injuring 46. The loss was blamed on Barzani, who had been in talks with the Iraqi Army about joint operations, by aspects of the Kurdish opposition's media. In January 2016, it was noted that he was the commander of Kurdish forces in one of the "hottest sectors" of the front line with ISIL.

In 2021, Barzani stated that Islamic State was "still a big threat for all of the world" and that the fighters "will keep pushing as they want to become more powerful". He went on to state that the COVID-19 Pandemic had been of benefit to the Islamic State in their efforts to reorganise.

In 2022, Barzani stated that the Peshmerga were growing deeply concerned that ISIS had started carrying out an increasing number of terrorist activities across the region in an attempt to rebuild its operating base.

In 2023, when asked what he thought would happen when the Western Coalition eventually leaves Iraq for good, he stated, "Let me be plain: it will be catastrophic. When they withdrew from Afghanistan, we saw first-hand how that empowered Isis; it gave their fighters hope they would do the same here. And when the Americans withdrew the troops in 2011, we also saw what happened: Al-Qaeda, the civil war and then Isis. If they withdraw their support, the same scenario will repeat itself—the state will fracture".

== Fraud and Corruption ==
In March 2023, Paris-based International Court of Arbitration found Sirwan Barzani guilty of fraud and corruption and awarded $1.65 billion in damages to Iraq Telecom Limited, a joint venture of Kuwaiti company Agility and French Orange Group, and International Holdings.
