= Barzani (tribe) =

Kurdish tribe in Iraq

The Barzani tribe (Kurdish: Eşîra Barzanî) is a Kurdish tribe and tribal confederation of various neighboring tribes inhabiting Barzan in Kurdistan Region of Iraq. The Barzanis are mostly Naqshbandi and one of the most influential tribes in Kurdistan.

== History ==
Barzanis were originally Yezidis who in 19th century converted to the Sufi or mystical form of Sunni Islam. By late 19th century, the Barzani tribe, who were led by a Barzani sheikh (hereditary local ruler), had established a local tekkeyeh and attracted support of several other Kurdish tribes.

The tekkeyeh became an asylum for the aggrieved local Kurdish tribes, assisting in strengthening the authority of the Barzani sheikhdom in the region and becoming the focal point of a claim for greater regional autonomy from what was at the time the Ottoman Empire.

The tribe has many Jewish members as well. Other than the Barzani tribe, the Barzanis consist of the Sherwani, Muzuri, Beroji, Nizari, Dolomari, Herki bneji and Gerdi tribes. During the Anfal campaign, about 8,000 members of the tribe were massacred.

== Persecution ==
On 10 June 1932 the Iraqi Army approached the Barzanis to avenge their prior uprising. Some 400 families had to leave their possessions and fled. Numerous women and children of the Barzani tribe fled to Turkey meanwhile about 250 men stayed to defend their homeland.

Between 1932 and 1934 the Iraqi Army together with the Royal Air Force attacked and destroyed 79 villages in the Barzan area. 2382 families were displaced from area. On 11 November 1945 the Royal Air Force bombed the area again, destroying 35 villages. More than 15.000 civilians fled to Iran.

On 10 April 1947, the Iranian Army launched attacks on the Barzanis with tanks and artillery which led to 5000 men, women and children fleeing and returning to Iraqi Kurdistan, where they were imprisoned and held captive for between 2 and 12 years.

In July and August 1983, by the orders of President Saddam Hussein over 8,000 men and boys of the Barzani tribe, some as young as 13, were killed by the Ba'athist Iraq.

== Barzani Family ==
- Abd al-Salam Barzani (1887-1914)
- Mohammed Sadiq Barzani
- Babo Barzani
  - Ayoub Barzani
- Ahmed Barzani (1896–1969) - Kurdish tribal leader of the Barzani tribe from 1931 to unknown.
  - Osman Barzani
    - Adham Barzani (1962-present) - Kurdish politician and former member of the Kurdistan Democratic Party.
- Mustafa Barzani (1903-1979) - Kurdish nationalist leader from 1946 to 1979.
  - Ubaidullah Barzani (1927-1980) - Minister of State in the Iraqi government in 1974 to 1980
  - Idris Barzani (1944-1987) -
    - Nechirvan Barzani (1966-present) - 2nd President of the Kurdistan Region of Iraq from 2019 to present.
      - five children
    - Rawan Barzani (1981-present) - Commander of the First Special Forces Brigade of the Kurdistan Region.
  - Masoud Barzani (1946-present) - President of the Kurdistan Region of Iraq from 2005 to 2017.
    - Masrour Barzani (1969-present) - Prime Minister of the Kurdistan Region, since June 2019.
    - Mansour Barzani (1978-present) - Liwa of the First Special Forces Division and of Gulan Special Forces.
  - Father Unknown
    - Sirwan Barzani (1970-present) (Masoud nephew)
    - Saywan Barzani (1972-present) (Masoud nephew)

=== Conflicts ===
- Ahmed Barzani revolt
- Anfal campaign
- 2017 Iraqi–Kurdish conflict

== See also ==
- Barzanism
- Barzani (surname)
- Barzani Jewish Neo-Aramaic
- Barzani Charity Foundation
- Anfal genocide
- Asenath Barzani
- Moshe Barazani
- Rawan Barzani
