= Barzani =

Barzani at times Barazani may refer to:

== Places ==
- Barzan, Iraq, a town in South Kurdistan

== See also ==
- Barzani (tribe)
- Barzani Jewish Neo-Aramaic, a dialect spoken by Kurdish Jews
- Barzani (surname)
