= National Reform Movement (Kurdistan) =

National Reform Movement Bizûtinewey‌ Chaksazi Nishtimani
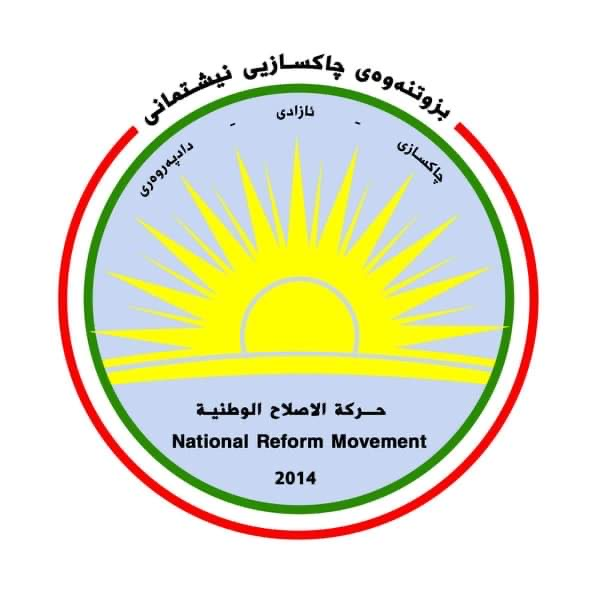
- Leader: Berun Omar Fatah
- Founder: Berun Omar Fatah
- Headquarters: Sulaymaniyah, Kurdistan Region of Iraq
- Ideology: Kurdish nationalism; Socialism; Social liberalism; Reformism

The National Reform Movement (Kurdish: Bizûtinewey‌ Chaksazi Nishtimani lit. National Reform Movement) is a Kurdish political party in the Kurdistan Region of Iraq. The party was founded and is led by Berun Omar Fatah, who established it on September 1, 2014, in Sulaymaniyah, Kurdistan Region of Iraq.

== Mission and objectives ==
The National Reform Movement seeks to promote reforms in governance and institutions within the Kurdistan Region. Its stated goals include improving transparency and accountability, encouraging economic development, free and fair elections and advancing social equity.

The party emphasizes principles of democracy and inclusivity, aiming to contribute to a more equitable and sustainable political framework."

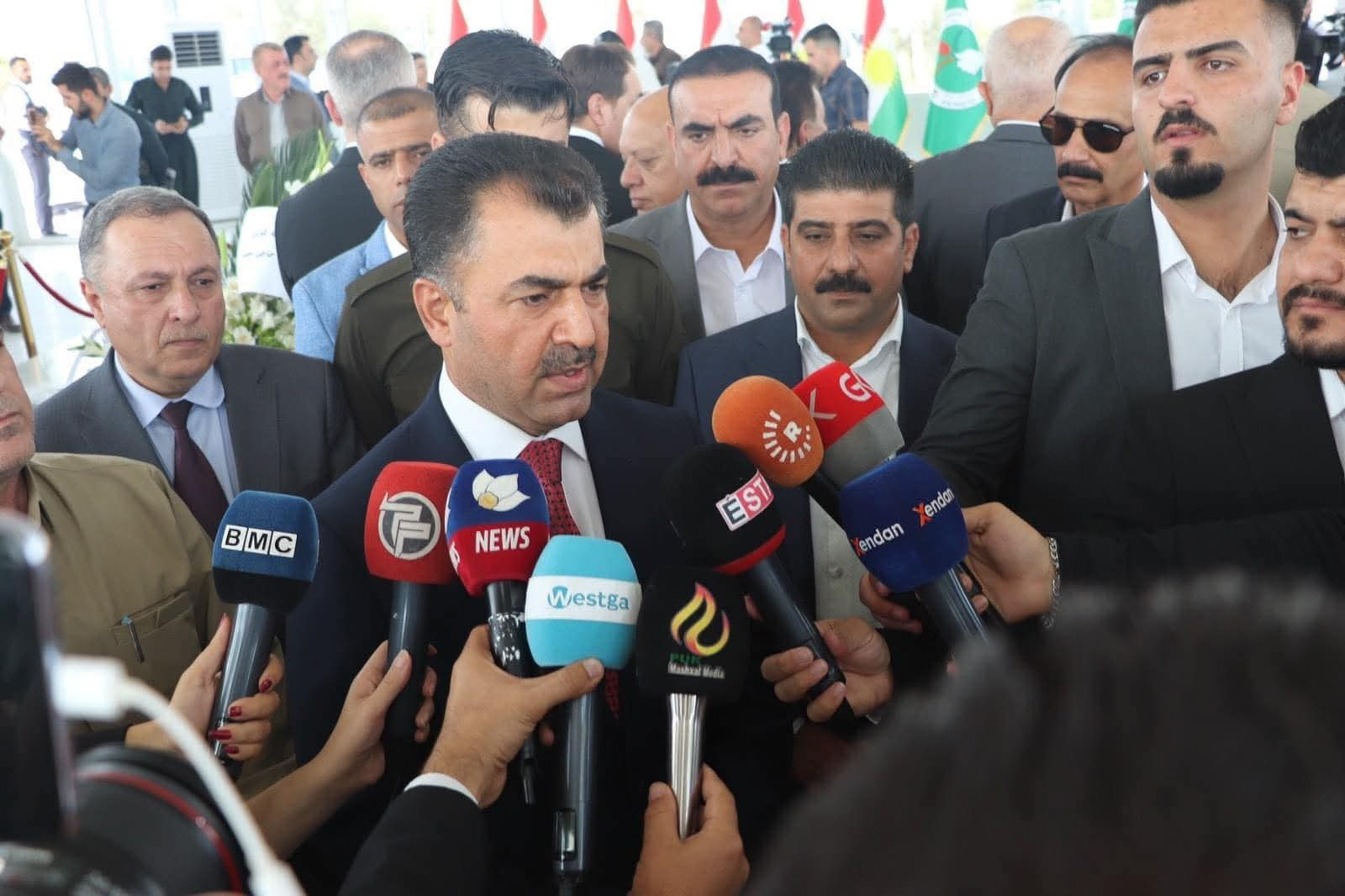
Berun Omar Fatah at PUK meeting 2019

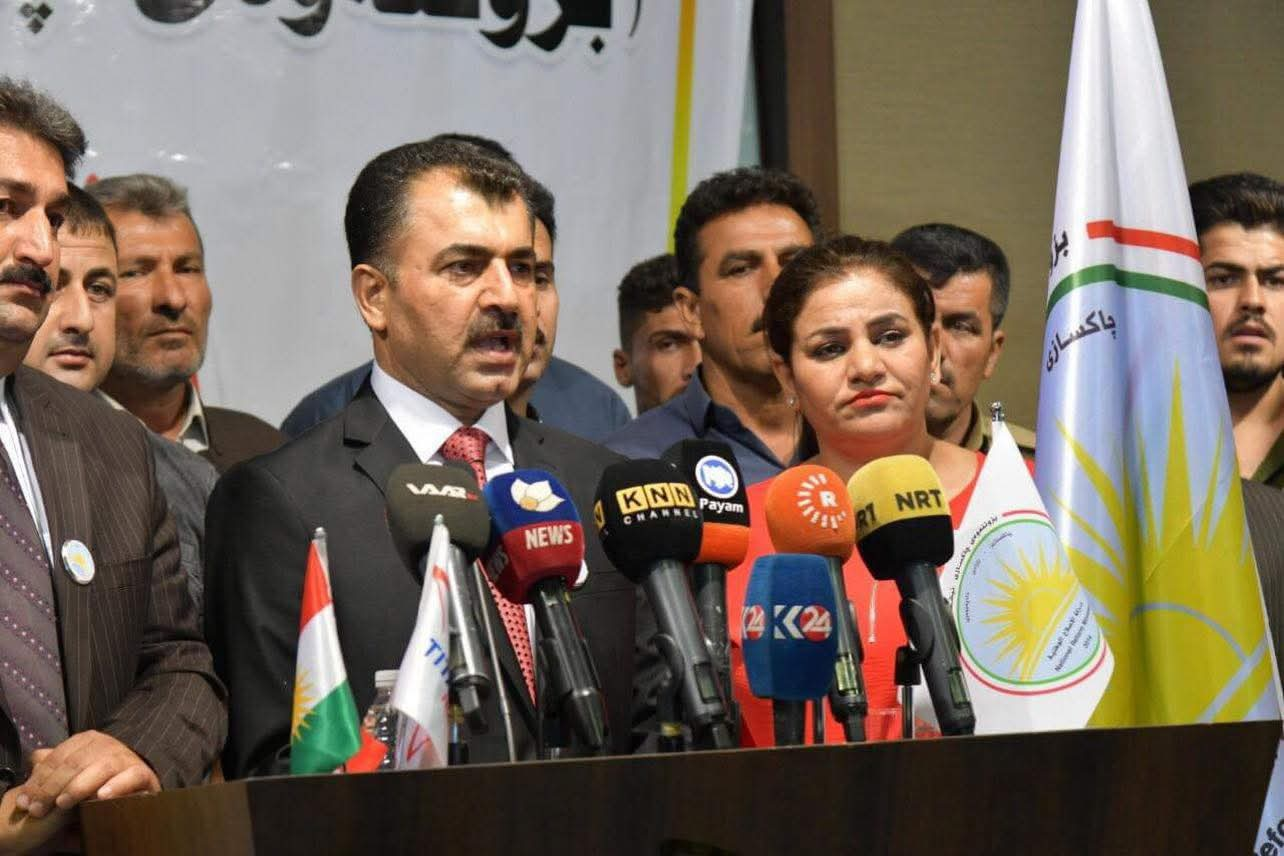
Berun Omar Fatah at NRM General Assembly 2020

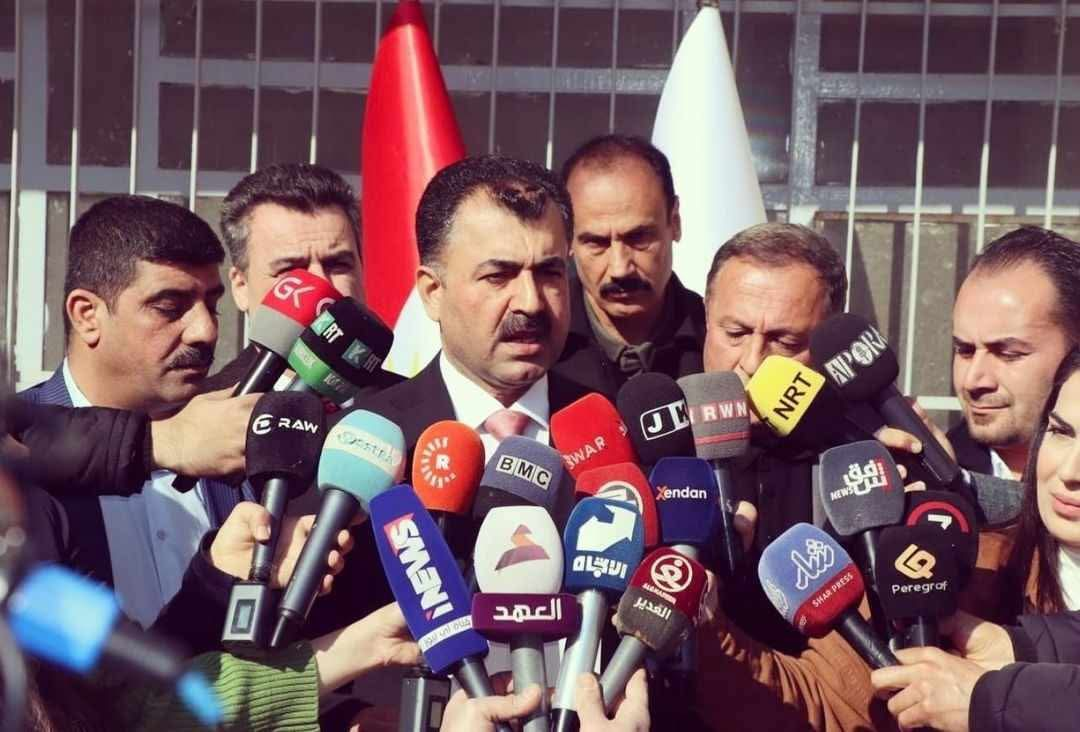
Berun Omar Fatah in 2016
