= Tsuri =

Tsuri can refer to:

- Japanese for angling, a fishing technique
- Tsuri Sagi (1934–2026), Israeli military officer
- Bairam Tsuri (1862–1925), Albanian independence activist
