= Rawan Barzani =

Commander of special first brigade forces Kurdistan Regional Government

Rawan Adris Barzani
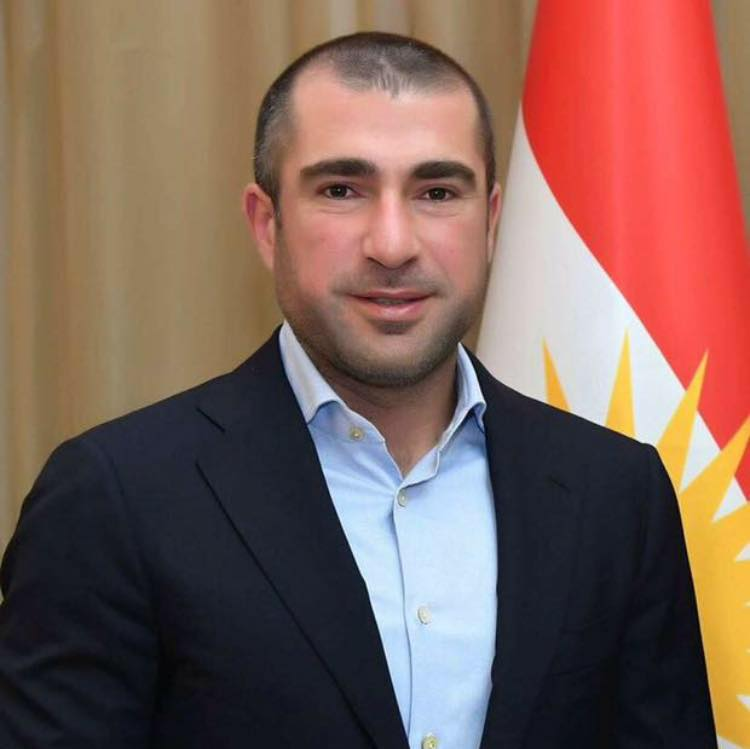
- Born: 1981; Kurdistan Region
- Notable work: Commander of Halo Special Division Kurdistan Regional Government
- Parent: Idris Barzani
- Relatives: Nechirvan Idris Barzani (brother); Masrour Barzani (cousin); Dilovan Barzani; Bariz Barzani; Abbas Barzani; Youssif Barzani
- Family: Barzani family

Rawan Idris Barzani (born February 17, 1981) is the son of the late Kurdish leader Idris Barzani and brother of the current president of the Kurdistan region, Nechirvan Barzani. He is the commander of the First Special Forces Brigade of the Kurdistan Region. He is also the cousin of the prime minister of the Kurdistan Region, Masrour Barzani and the commander of the first battalion of the Kurdish special forces.

Rawan Barzani played a major role in fighting and defeating ISIS terror group since the group's rise in 2014, and oversaw a long front-line, stretching more than 100 km from Mosul Dam to Sinjar. He is known for supporting and assisting those in need and has launched several initiatives in support of the youth.
