= BLE =

BLE or Ble may refer to:

- Ble (band), a pop-rock band from Greece
- Ble., a trade abbreviation for Bletilla, an orchid genus
- Bluetooth Low Energy, a wireless personal area network technology
- Ble, another name for Az Zibar, a small town in the Kurdistan Region of Iraq

== Transport ==
=== Air ===
- Borlänge Airport, in Dalarna, Sweden, by IATA code
- Blue Line (airline), based in Paris, France, by ICAO code

=== Rail ===
- Bessemer and Lake Erie Railroad, in the United States by reporting mark
- Bramley (West Yorkshire) railway station, in Leeds, England, by National Rail code
- Brotherhood of Locomotive Engineers, a railway labor union in the United States
- Braunschweigische Landes-Eisenbahn-Gesellschaft, the German name of the Brunswick State Railway Company
