= Tsuri Sagi =

Israeli military officer (1934–2026)

- צורי שגיא
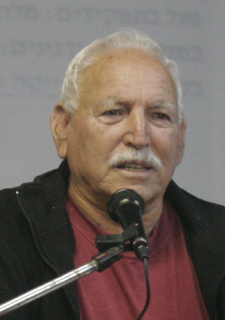
- Sagi in 2014
- Born: Tsuri Sheinkin; 1934; Herzliya, Mandatory Palestine
- Died: 19 August 2026 (aged 92); Israel
- Military career
- Allegiance: Israel
- Branch: Israel Defense Forces
- Service years: 1952–1984
- Rank: Brigadier general
- Conflicts: Arab–Israeli conflict; Reprisal operations; Suez Crisis; Six-Day War; War of Attrition; Battle of Karameh; Yom Kippur War; Iraqi–Kurdish conflict; First Iraqi–Kurdish War; Battle of Mount Handrin; Second Iraqi–Kurdish War

Tsuri Sagi (né Sheinkin, Hebrew: צורי שגיא; 1934 – 19 August 2026) was an Israeli military officer and senior commander in the 35th Paratroopers Brigade. During the First Iraqi–Kurdish War, he helped Kurdish forces train and strategize on behalf of the Mossad and became close with Kurdish leader Mustafa Barzani. His planning enabled a major Kurdish victory against the Iraqi Armed Forces in the May 1966 battle of Mount Handrin, which was won by an ambush that killed around 3,000 Iraqi soldiers. He returned to Kurdistan during the Second Iraqi–Kurdish War in 1974 and helped the Peshmerga achieve victories against the Iraqi army, although the war ended in a peace deal that forced the Kurds to cut ties with Israel.

== Early life ==
Sagi was born as Tsuri Sheinkin in Herzliya, Mandatory Palestine, in 1934 to Mordechai and Froma Sheinkin, who were from Latvia and Poland, respectively, and were founders of kibbutz Shefayim. After World War II, they moved to moshav Ein Vered, where he worked in the fields.

== Military career ==
=== Early service (1952–1965) ===
Sagi, then Sheinkin, enlisted in the Israel Defense Forces (IDF) in 1952, joining the 35th Paratroopers Brigade. During his service, he adopted a Hebrew surname, as customary in the IDF. He participated in reprisal operations along ceasefire boundaries; while a platoon commander in Arik Sharon's brigade, he and his combat partner in Deir al-Balah ambushed a tent of Egyptian soldiers during a reconnaissance operation, surviving despite heavy gunfire. He was also a battalion commander in Rafael Eitan's unit. During Operation Olive Leaves in Syria, Eitan was seriously wounded in the battle, leading Sagi, who was his deputy at the time, to take command and complete the destruction of Syrian positions.

During the 1956 Suez Crisis, he was promoted to commander of Company C of the 890th Battalion and took part in the battle of Mitla Pass. Between 1959 and 1960, he commanded a paratrooper patrol, before being sent to Ethiopia to train its army officers. From 1963 to 1965, he served as commander of the 890th Battalion. The battalion conducted Operation Rock Cliff, a raid in Jordanian-controlled Qalqilya; Sagi's role as commander of the raid was praised by then-IDF chief Yitzhak Rabin, who said: "It was a good performance in accordance with the objectives that were set. I have no words, only words of praise."

=== Assistance to the Iraqi Kurds (1965–1967) ===
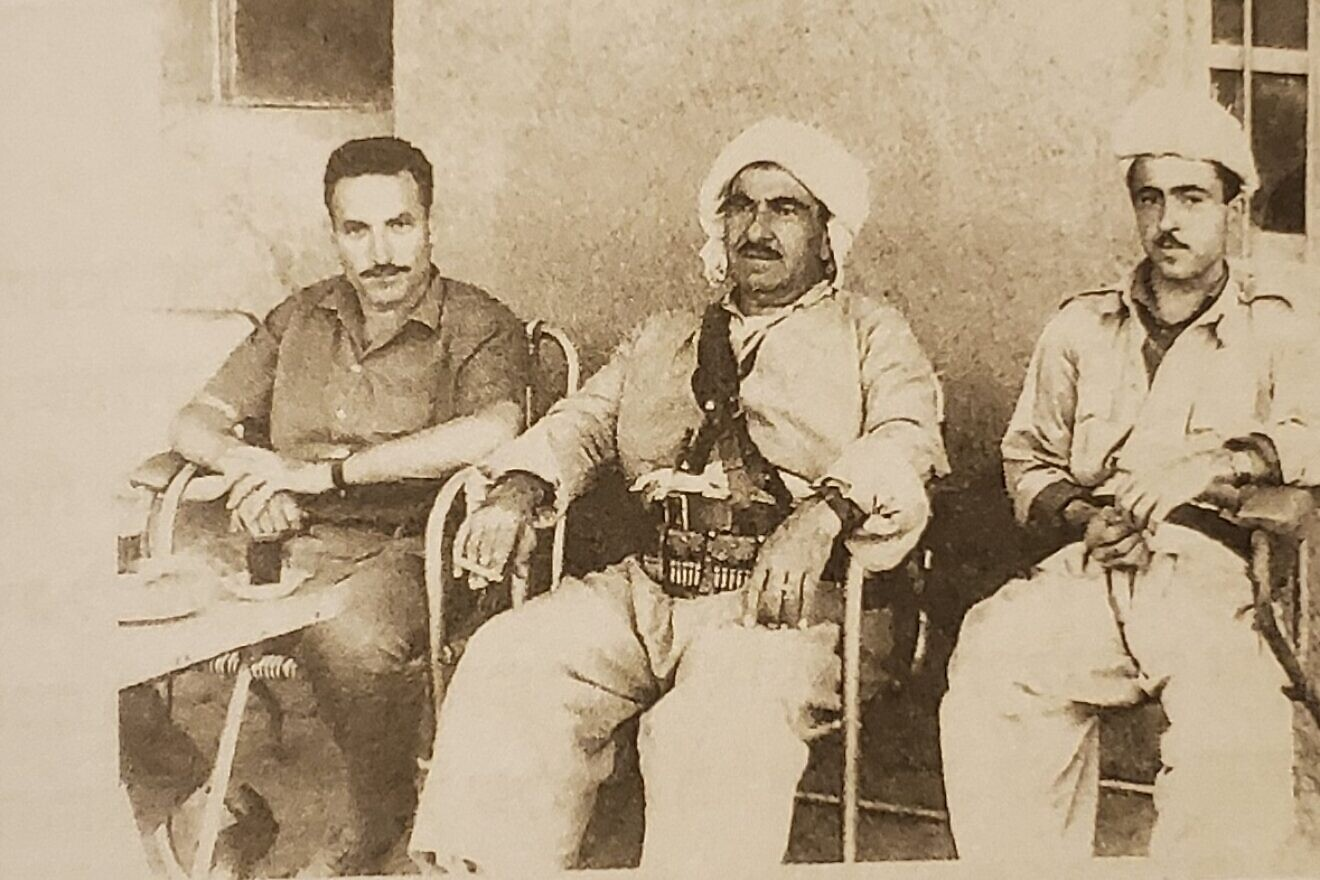
Sagi, Mustafa Barzani, and Idris Barzani (left to right) after the battle of Mount Handrin in 1966

In July 1965, he was sent to Tehran to train Iranian special forces, where he taught them strategies that he learned during the reprisal operations, such as guerrilla warfare, urban warfare, and sabotage. He also helped organize the defense of oil refineries in the Persian Gulf.

While in Iran, the Iranians requested that he help train the Kurds, who were waging an uprising in northern Iraq against the Ba'athist government. After receiving authorization from the Mossad, Sagi agreed to help; however, his tactics were not sufficient for the Kurds, who were facing the much more advanced, Soviet-backed Iraqi Armed Forces, which had six brigades stationed at Geli Ali Beg, 80 miles (130 km) north of Kurdish capital Erbil, who were preparing to launch an offensive after the snow melted. Sagi devised a new plan, which he based around the mountainous terrain of the region and the Kurdish use of Zbrojovka Brno rifles, which were effective at long range. Kurdish commanders were brought to Tehran for defensive training, and after training for three months, Sagi requested the Iranian government to allow the Kurds to conduct live drills. However, Shah Mohammad Reza Pahlavi refused, and the Kurds were brought to Israel instead, where live drills took place in Daliyat al-Karmel.

In winter 1966, Sagi was sent to northern Iraq by Mossad commander Meir Amit, accompanied by Mossad agent and Persian-speaker Maki Evron. There, he met with Kurdistan Democratic Party leader Mustafa Barzani and presented his plan: a force of 1,000 fighters were to be stationed in two channels between the mountains, where they would conduct an ambush against Iraqi forces. Barzani, however, was not able to understand the plan, as he was unable to read a map. Since Barzani and his delegation would remove their shoes at the meetings, Sagi told them to bring him their shoes. He then assigned each shoe with the name of a mountain and arranged them into the Kurdish terrain, allowing Barzani and his men to understand the plan.

In the meantime, Sagi helped establish defensive lines for the Kurds against the Iraqis. When the Iraqi offensive began in May 1966, these lines were crushed. At this point, Sagi was ordered by the IDF to return to Israel, which he refused. He asked Maki: "Which is the best Iraqi brigade?", which he answered with: "The 4th Brigade". Sagi decided to enact his plan against this brigade, and ordered a Kurdish battalion of 1,000 men to retreat into Mount Handrin, which reluctantly agreed. The battalion was positioned into two channels. When the 4th Brigade, numbering 5,000 soldiers, charged into the mountains, they were ambushed on all sides in the battle of Mount Handrin, suffering at least 3,000 deaths. Two more Iraqi brigades were sent to the area, and retreated after suffering heavy losses. After the victory, Sagi proposed using a force of 2,000 Kurdish fighters to encircle Iraqi forces at Mount Korek. The plan succeeded, and the Iraqis began to negotiate. Barzani asked Sagi whether he should declare independence, although being only a battalion commander, he refused to answer.

To thank Sagi, Barzani summoned him to a meeting and gifted him a seven-month old Syrian brown bear, which was later named Shamo. Fearing that rejecting the gift would be considered insulting and potentially damage relations with the Kurds, Sagi accepted it and contacted a Mossad officer, and both decided to wait for the arrival of Meir Amit before making a decision. However, upon Amit's arrival, the agents had already bonded with Shamo, sleeping in the same tent as him and sharing their food rations. They described him as "a bear that thinks he is a dog". After Sagi left Kurdistan, Shamo was brought to Israel via an Israeli Air Force transport aircraft and was then sent to the Tel Aviv Zoo.

After returning to Tehran, he was reprimanded by an Israeli delegation, who told him "Who do you think you are—Ben Gurion?" Before leaving to Israel in 1967, Barzani thanked him for his assistance, telling him: "You are like a son to me". He answered by offering to return if Barzani needed him again.

=== Later career (1967–1984) ===
Upon his return to Israel, he participated in the Six-Day War, serving in an airborne unit that was sent to capture Sharm El Sheikh. The site was later captured by the Israeli Navy. After the war, from 1967 to 1968, he served as the deputy commander of the 35th Paratroopers Brigade, partaking in the battle of Karameh in Jordan. He then served as an AGM officer in the Central Command for a year, directing operations against Jordanian infiltrators during the War of Attrition. From 1969 to 1971, he led the 5th Reserve Infantry Brigade. He then led the 820th Regional Brigade until 1973. A day before the Yom Kippur War broke out, he was assigned to command the Northern Command's Meron District and the Golan Heights. During the war, he defended the Lebanese border against infiltration attempts. Shortly after it ended, he took command of the 317th Reserve Paratrooper Brigade, leading it through the defense of Israeli occupied territory beyond the Golan Heights in Syria until they were withdrawn from in the Agreement on Disengagement between Israel and Syria.

During the Second Iraqi–Kurdish War in 1974, Mossad head Zvi Zamir told Sagi, "Your friend Mullah Mustafa is in serious trouble", and sent him to Kurdistan, where he posed as a British journalist. The Peshmerga was better equipped than before, having received eight years of training from Israel, but was still outmatched by the Iraqi Armed Forces, which deployed two armored divisions and 12 infantry brigades. Sagi taught the Kurds how to set anti-tank ambushes, and under his supervision, four Iraqi attack waves were repelled and faced heavy casualties, including the loss of senior generals. The war ended with the 1975 Algiers Agreement, and Barzani was forced to cut ties with Israel. His army retreated into Iran, shocking Sagi, who had expected them to wage a guerrilla war. In the 2012 documentary Sealed Lips, Sagi said that 12,000 Iraqi soldiers were killed in the war. The documentary also revealed that Sagi was the mastermind of a previously unreported Israeli assassination attempt against Iraqi leader Saddam Hussein. He requested that the Mossad send its best bombmaker, identified only as Natan, as part of the plot. Natan built a book bomb that was delivered to Saddam, although Saddam had another high-ranking official open the package due to his paranoia, killing them instead.

In 1977, he was promoted to brigadier general and commanded the Solomon Region in the Sinai Peninsula until 1980. After studying at the National Security College for a year, he took command of the Central Command's 81st Regional Divison until 1983. In 1984, he retired from the IDF. Historian Uri Milstein said that he deserved to be a major general and chief of the general staff, but that Israel "wasted his talent" because he was against the 1982 Lebanon War.

== Later life and death ==
After his retirement, he and his wife, Tzipa, had their only son, Yair, who worked as a journalist for Yedioth Ahronoth. In 2012, he was given the honorary title "Yakir" by Ramat Gan. In a 2019 interview with Maariv, he revealed that he was still in contact with the Kurds and had even been offered to visit them, however his visit was prohibited by the authorities.

Sagi died on 19 August 2026, at the age of 92. He was buried the following day in Tel Mond. His funeral was attended by hundreds of people, including former Chief of the General Staff Moshe Ya'alon and retired generals Tal Russo, Uri Sagi, Yitzhak Mordechai, Yoram Yair, Amos Yaron, and Matan Vilnai. Also in attendance were former police chief Assaf Hefetz, Omri Sharon, and Hilik Magnus.
