= Ubaidullah Barzani =

Iraqi Kurdish politician

- عوبەیدوڵڵا بارزانی
- Born: 1927; Barzan, Mandatory Iraq
- Died: 1980 (aged 52–53)
- Cause of death: Execution
- Citizenship: Iraq
- Employer: Minister of State (1974 - 1980)
- Father: Mustafa Barzani
- Family: Barzani Family

Ubaidullah Barzani (Kurdish: عوبەیدوڵڵا بارزانی, romanized: 'Ûbeydûlla Barzanî) was an Iraqi Kurdish politician, and the eldest son of the Kurdish leader Mustafa Barzani.

He was born in 1927, and was his father's right-hand man. He was imprisoned in Basra from 1947 to 1955 after the failure of a rebellion led by his father against the Iraqi government. He was then detained in Baghdad for the period from 1955 to 1958. He was released after the, 14 July revolution in 1958. He defected from his father in 1973, and supported the Iraqi government's plan to declare an autonomous region in northern Iraq.

== New Party ==
He joined the new Kurdistan Democratic Party, which was founded by Hashem Aqrawi and Aziz Aqrawi. He was appointed as Minister of State in the Iraqi government in 1974 during the rule of President Ahmed Hassan al-Bakr, and continued in his position in the Iraqi government during Saddam Hussein's rule, but was executed in the early 1980s.

== See also ==
Barzani (tribe)
