= Abdul Aziz al-Uqaili =

16th Iraqi Minister of Defense

Abd al-'Aziz al-'Uqaili
- Born: 1919
- Died: 17 July 1968 (aged 48–49)
- Education: Royal Military Academy
- Military career
- Allegiance: (Ba'athist Iraq) Iraqi Armed Forces
- Service years: 1963-1968
- Conflicts: Battle of Mount Handrin

Abd al-'Aziz al-'Uqaili (Arabic: عبدالعزيز العقيلي, 1919–1981), was an Iraqi regular military officer and Minister. He served as Minister of Defense from 21 September 1965 until 18 April 1966 under Iraqi President Abdul Salam Arif.

== Biography ==
Al-'Uqaili was born in Mosul, a Northern city of Iraq in 1919. He graduated from Royal Military Academy in Baghdad in January 1938, and Staff Military College in 1945. Al-'Uqaili started studying law in 1946 and graduated from Law college in 1950. After the Iraqi Ba'ath Party Government overthrow by Abdul Salam Arif in November 1963, Al-'Uqaili was assigned to be Director of Iraqi ports in the Basra in the south of Iraq from 1963 until 21 September 1965. During the First-Iraqi Kurdish war, Al-'Uqaili was the commander of the Iraqi units in Battle of Mount Handrin. He also served as Minister of Defense from 1965 to 1966. Ba'athism caught him two months after they came to power on 17 July, 1968. The revolution court sentenced him to life imprisonment in 1970 and he died in prison on 7 May 1981.

Political offices
| Preceded by Arif Abd ar-Razzaq | Defence minister 1965-1966 | Succeeded by Shakir Mahmud Shukri |
