= Telephone numbers in Iraq =

- Country: Iraq
- Continent: Asia
- Numbering plan type: closed
- Country code: +964
- International access: 00
- Long-distance: 0

Iraq area codes can be 1 or 2 digits (not counting the trunk prefix 0) and the subscriber numbers are usually 6 digits. In Baghdad and some other governorates, they are 7 digits. The mobile numbers have 10 digits, beginning with the 3-digit code of each operator followed by 7 digits.

== Dialing procedure ==
A call from outside Iraq would have the following dialing format when calling a:

- Landline telephone:

International call prefix	Country Code	Area code	Subscriber number
00 or 011 in place of +	964	(Area Code)	(Telephone Number)

- Mobile telephone:

International call prefix	Country Code	Operator Code	Subscriber Number
00 or 011 in place of +	964	7xx	123 4567

== List of Area Codes in Iraq ==
LIST OF AREA CODES
Area/City	Area Code	Area/City	Area Code
Baghdad	1	Salah ad Din (Tikrit)	21
Erbil (Hêwler)	66	Dohuk(Duhok)	62
Wasit (Al Kut)	23	Anbar (Ramadi)	24
Diyala (Baquba)	25	Babil (Hilla)	30
Karbala	32	Najaf	33
Al-Qādisiyyah (Diwaniya)	36	Al Muthanna (Samawa)	37
Basrah	40	Dhi Qar (Nasiriya)	42
Maysan (Amarah)	43	Kirkuk(Kerkûk)	50
Sulaimaniya(Slemani)	53	Nineveh (Mosul)	60

== List of Mobile Phones Codes in Iraq ==
There are four active mobile phone providers providing voice service in Iraq: Korek, Zain, Alkafeel Omnnea & Asiacell; Fastlink provides cellular data services.

Carrier	Mobile Prefix
Korek Telecom	750, 751
Alkafeel Omnnea	760
Asiacell	77x
Zain	78x, 790
