= Korek Telecom =

Telecommunication company in Kurdistan region, Iraq

- Type: Private
- Industry: Telecommunications
- Founded: 2000; 26 years ago
- Headquarters: Erbil, Kurdistan Region, Iraq
- Key people: Sirwan Barzani (Founder)
- Products: Telecommunications
- Number of employees: 2500 (2011)

Korek Telecom (Sorani Kurdish: کۆڕەک تیلیکۆم) is an Iraqi telecommunications company in Erbil, Kurdistan Region. In August 2026, all of its assets were ordered to be seized by the Iraqi Communications and Media Commission (CMC). Due to outstanding debts and unresolved legal issues, CMC began procedures to dissolve the company on 1 November 2026.

== History ==
In March 2011, France Télécom (now Orange S.A.) acquired a 20% indirect stake in Korek Telecom.

On Jan 1, 2015, Korek launched 3G in Iraq after winning one of the three 3G licenses awarded by the government of Iraq. On Dec 16, 2015, Korek became the first operator in Iraq to launch Free Basics in Iraq in partnership with Internet.org and Facebook.

In March 2023, the company was implicated in a major corruption scandal and found guilty of bribing regulators, self-dealing, diversions of corporate assets, sham loans, and other illegal schemes. The Paris-based International Court of Arbitration found Korek and its founder and controlling shareholder Sirwan Barzani guilty of ‘fraud and corruption’ and awarded $1.65 billion in damages to Iraq Telecom Limited, a joint venture of Kuwaiti company Agility and French Orange Group, and International Holdings.

== Shutdown ==
Due to the company's failure to pay debts (worth over US$1 billion) owed to the government, in November 2023 Iraq's telecommunications regulator (CMC) blocked all incoming and outgoing communications between Korek and other carriers as a punitive measure. In September 2024, Korek announced that it had reached an agreement with CMC over its financial obligations, however, the block ordered by CMC on external communications remained. In 2025, a judicial committee was appointed to issue recommendations regarding the legal battle between the regulator and the company which were approved by Iraqi authorities. This resulted in a financial settlement agreement being reached in June 2025 between the two parties.

However, in February 2026, CMC annulled the agreement reached in June and ordered Korek's internet services to be blocked, again due to the company's inability to comply with its financial obligations. Korek subsequently sued CMC over its decision to annul the settlement agreement at Baghdad's Rusafa Court of First Instance.

On 9 August 2026, following the expiration of Korek's operating contract, CMC ordered the full seizure of all movable and immovable assets belonging to Korek. Korek released a statement complaining about the actions taken against it and pleading to the Iraqi prime minister for intervention, citing the formal agreement reached in June 2025. According to CMC, Korek had violated the conditions of the agreement by failing to meet the legal and financial obligations therein, effectively rendering the agreement void. The procedures for the shutdown of the company began on 10 August 2026. On the same day, Masoud Barzani announced that he would visit the capital to discuss "a crucial matter". The visit was abruptly cancelled the next day. On 19 August 2026, CMC urged all Korek users to register with other licensed telecommunications operators and set up alternative authentication and recovery methods in order to avoid losing access to their accounts registered with Korek telephone numbers as well as avoid data loss.

During the Baghdad International Dialogue Conference which was attended by Baleegh Abu Kalal, CMC's director of operations, he stated that 'digital sovereignty' belongs exclusively to the federal government, and that telecommunications companies in Kurdistan Region will pay the price for the debts they owe the government.

On 23 August 2026, Baghdad's Rusafa District Court issued a decision to temporarily suspend CMC's actions against Korek until a formal verdict is reached in court. The decision came after the regulator closed Korek's Baghdad headquarters and outlets in the city. On 26 August 2026, the Rusafa District Court issued a ruling "overturning the injunction filed by the managing director of Korek Telecom and upholding the CMC’s decision to suspend operations with the company". The court found that Korek's petition lacked "procedural and legal grounds".

On 3 September 2026, CMC closed Korek's offices and service centres in Najaf, Karbala, Diwaniyah and Babylon. On 6 September, the closures were extended to Kirkuk, Saladin and Nineveh. On 13 September, CMC announced that Korek users had until 30 September to secure their accounts before their communications are shut down, stating: "once the specified deadline has passed, [CMC] will proceed to shut down Korek Telecom's telephone exchange in the capital Baghdad and the rest of Iraq's governorates in turn, as part of the regulatory and legal measures taken against the company". On 18 September, Kurdistan Regional Government minister of communications stated that Korek will not cease operations in Kurdistan Region, since, according to the minister, no company can be shut down without consulting with the regional government. On 28 September, Baghdad's Rusafa Court of First Instance ruled that the financial settlement agreement reached in June 2025 between the two parties remained valid, overturning CMC's decision to unilaterally annul it. In a statement released by CMC, it indicated that it would continue its closure of the company and that the ruling did not impede that, rather, that it merely obligated Korek to pay its debts while having no ruling regarding the legality of CMC's efforts to shut down the company. On 30 September, CMC offered Korek an opportunity to resume operations if it pays an initial payment of debt worth 500 billion Iraqi dinars (US$382 million) as a sign of good faith.

On 6 October, CMC announced that the deadline for Korek's shutdown would be delayed by one month, to 1 November 2026, due to a request by the Iraqi parliament's communications committee. This was reportedly done in order to give Korek customers more time to secure their accounts.

On 1 November 2026, formal procedures to shut down Korek began. CMC announced the closing of the company's switching centers in several governorates, resulting in cessation of service in 14 governorates. There were procedures underway to close all remaining ones.

== See also ==
- Asiacell
- Zain Iraq
- Telephone numbers in Iraq
