= Ayoub Barzani =

Iraqi writer

Ayoub Barzani is a Kurdish writer and critic. He is the son of Babo Barzani, Ahmed Barzani's (The head of Barzan tribe) nephew and the first-cousin of Massoud Barzani, the former President of Iraqi Kurdistan.

He took refuge in Iran after the collapse of the Kurdish revolt in 1975. While in Iran, he was arrested and intimidated by the Iranian secret service, the (SAVAK). He left Iran at the end of 1976 and sought asylum in the UK. Ayoub Barzani currently resides in Switzerland, where he is a co-founder of an organisation known as Kurdistan Democratic Alliance.

He was interviewed by Michael M. Gunter for his book.

== Works ==
- "The Assassination of the Spiritual Guide", Kurdish Aspect
- Barzan and the Awakening of the Kurdish National Movement 1828–1914
- Introduction to Kurdish Resistance to Occupation 1914 - 1958
