= Asiacell =

Telecommunications company in Iraq

- Type: Public
- Industry: Telecommunications
- Founded: 1999; 27 years ago
- Headquarters: Sulaimaniyah, Kurdistan Region, Iraq
- Key people: Amer Al Sunna (CEO); Faruk M. Rasool (Founder)
- Products: Telecommunications
- Revenue: 2,024,000,000,000 Iraqi dinar (2025)
- Parent: Ooredoo
- Website: www.asiacell.com/personal

Asiacell Telecom Company (Arabic: آسياسيل, Kurdish: ئاسیاسێڵ) is an Iraqi telecommunications company that offers mobile phone services and Mobile Internet mainly in Iraq.

== History ==
Asiacell, the first mobile telecommunications company in Iraq, was established in the city of Sulaymaniyah in the Kurdistan Region in 1999.

Asiacell began its first commercial operations in 2000.

In October 2003, Asiacell was granted a two-year GSM license for the six northern provinces of Iraq, catering in the process to a wider client base who collectively shared a need for a quality mobile network. The license was extended in 2005 to cover the entirety of the Iraqi Republic. Consequently, today it is the only telecom network to provide coverage nationwide.

In August 2007, Asiacell bid and won a 15-year national license, becoming the GSM telecom operator with the largest long-term network coverage in the country. The company's breakthrough successes have naturally led to its expansion and growth, thereby quickly reaching almost 2000 employees. The famous Kurdish singer Chopy Fatah became the cultural ambassador of the company in 2008. To handle new business operations, Asiacell also simultaneously established new executive offices in Baghdad, Mosul, and other major cities in Iraq,

Today, the company caters to more than 9.1 million subscribers around the country.

On February 2, 2013, Asiacell went public offering 25% of its equity, in an IPO that was considered the largest in the MEANA region since 2008.

In April 2015, the Iraqi singer-songwriter Kadhim Al-Saher became a representative of the brand.

In February 2017, the company began offering free access to Wikipedia for its customers, despite complications regarding Net Neutrality provisions.

In 2026, Asiacell Is A Premium Sponsor To Paris Saint Germain

== See also ==
- Korek Telecom
