= Az Zibar =

Az Zibar Ble
- Town
- Location within Iraqi Kurdistan Location within Iraq
- Coordinates: 36°51′43″N 44°3′54″E
- Country: Iraq
- Autonomous region: Kurdistan
- Province: Erbil
- District: Mergasor
- Time zone: UTC+3

Az Zibar (Kurdish: Zêbar ,زێبار), also known as Ble, is a small town on the Great Zab in the mountains of the Erbil Governorate, Kurdistan Region in Iraq. The Shanidar Cave is located 14 kilometres (9 mi) to the southeast.
