= Kurds in Iraq =

Ethnic group

Iraqi Kurds
کوردانی عێراق Kurdanî Êraq العراقيين الكرد
- Flag of Kurdistan Region

Total population
- Estimated (Note: The Iraqi government has not conducted a nationwide census since 1987; all figures are estimates. The questionnaire used in the 2024 national census did not include ethnicity.) 13.8–16% or 15–20% of the total population of Iraq

Regions with significant populations
- Kurdistan Region: Erbil, Sulaymaniyah, Duhok, Halabja; Disputed territories of Northern Iraq: Kirkuk, Nineveh, Diyala

Languages
- Kurdish (Sorani, Kurmanji and Feyli); Arabic (Mesopotamian Arabic, Modern Standard Arabic)

Religion
- Predominantly: Sunni Islam; Minority: Yazidism, Shia Islam

Kurds are the second largest ethnic group of Iraq. They traditionally speak the Kurdish languages of Sorani, Kurmanji, Feyli, and Gorani.

Historically, Kurds in Iraq have experienced varying degrees of autonomy and marginalization. While the Treaty of Sèvres (1920) proposed Kurdish independence, this was never implemented, and Iraqi Kurds were incorporated into the modern state of Iraq. Following the withdrawal of the Iraqi Army from the Kurdistan Region in 1991, the Kurdistan Regional Government (KRG) was established, and ultimately recognized by the Iraqi government in 2005, granting the region a degree of self-governance. Iraqi Kurdistan remains a significant political and cultural entity within Iraq.

== History ==
The Kurdish people are an ethnic group whose origins are in the Middle East. They are one of the largest ethnic groups in the world that do not have a state of their own. This geo-cultural region means "Land of the Kurds". Kurdistan Region is a semi-autonomous region in northern Iraq has a population of approximately 6 million people. Kurdish populations occupy the territory in and around the Zagros Mountains. These arid unwelcoming mountains have been a geographic buffer to cultural and political dominance from neighboring empires. Persians, Arabs, and Ottomans were kept away, and a space was carved out to develop Kurdish culture, language, and identity. Arabs applied the name "Kurds" to the people of the mountains after they had conquered and Islamicized the region.

=== Classical period ===
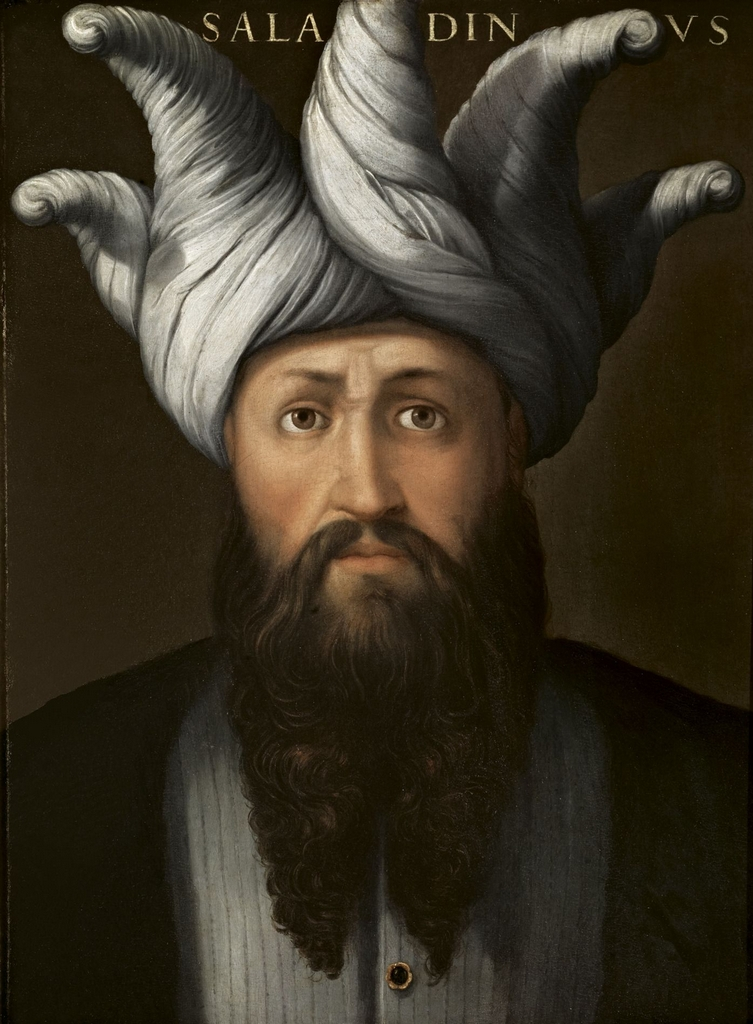
Saladin, of Kurdish origin, who founded the Ayyubid dynasty, was born in Tikrit in present-day Iraq.

Several Kurdish dynasties such as Annazids (990/1–1117) and Hasanwayhids (or Hasanuyids, 959–1015) ruled in northern Iraq. The Kurdish Marwanid dynasty (983–1096) temporarily ruled over Mosul. The Ayyubid dynasty, was a powerful Islamic dynasty of Kurdish origin and also ruled northern Iraq.

=== Ottoman Conquest and Aftermath ===
In the 1500s, most Kurds came under the rule of the Ottoman Empire, where they were governed as part of the empire's administrative structure. Iraqi Kurds began to emerge as a distinct subgroup of the Kurdish population following the creation of the modern state of Iraq by Great Britain under the terms of the Sykes–Picot Agreement during World War I.

The Kurdish expectation of independence, promised in the Treaty of Sèvres in 1920, was short-lived. In 1923, the Treaty of Lausanne established the Republic of Turkey, redefining borders and negating provisions for a Kurdish state. Similarly, the Anglo-Iraqi Treaty of 1922, which laid the groundwork for Iraqi independence, did not include any guarantees for Kurdish autonomy.

=== Kurdish nationalist movement ===
In 1946 the Kurdish Democratic Party (KDP) was founded by Mulla Mustafa Barzani which pushed for Kurdish autonomy under the Iraqi government. In the year 1958, Abdul Karim Qasim made a coup against the British and the Republic of Iraq was established. The Kurds had hoped that now they would receive their promised rights, but the political environment was not favorable. So the KDP began an insurgency against the Government in Baghdad in 1961. Their insurgency was in part successful as in 1966 official Kurdish groups gained some rights with the Bazzaz Declaration and with the 1970 Peace Accord a principle of Kurdish autonomy was reached. In the 1970 Peace Accord, Kurdish cultural, social and political rights were recognized within fifteen points. These rights were never implemented, not due to unwillingness on the part of the Arabs, but rather because of political developments. Nevertheless, the Kurds had a period of greater liberty from 1970 to 1974. But in March 1975 the Iraq and Iran reached an agreement and within a few hours after the agreement, Iran stopped all support to the KDP, whose members and their families had the choice between go to exile to Iran or surrender to the Iraqi authority. Most KDP members chose to live in exile and the KDP declared the end of their insurgency. Therefore, in 1975, another political party emerged in Iraqi Kurdistan, led by Jalal Talabani—the Patriotic Union of Kurdistan (PUK). Since the PUK was established, it lacked cooperation and engaged in violent conflict with the KDP over differing philosophies, demographics, and goals. From March 1987 until 1989 the Anfal campaign lasted, with which the Kurds were supposed to be Arabized. During the Anfal campaign the Iraqi military attacked about 250 Kurdish villages with chemical weapons and destroyed Kurdish 4500 villages and evicted its inhabitants. The campaign culminated in the Halabja massacre in March 1988.

After the Gulf War and an unsuccessful Kurdish uprising in 1991, Kurds fled back to the mountains to seek refuge from the government forces. The United States established a no fly zone initiative in Iraqi Kurdistan for the Kurds as an asylum away from the Iraqi government. United Nations Security Council Resolution 688 in 1991 condemned and forbade "the repression of the Iraqi civilian population... in Kurdish populated areas." After many bloody encounters, an uneasy balance of power was reached between the Iraqi forces and Kurdish troops, ultimately allowing Iraqi Kurdistan to function independently. The region continued to be ruled by the KDP and PUK and began to establish a stable economy and national identity. Iraqi Kurdistan built a socioeconomic infrastructure from scratch, completely independent from the centralized framework of Ba'athist Iraq. Though civil war broke out in the north between Barzani's Kurdistan Democratic Party and Talabani's Patriotic Union of Kurdistan from 1994 to 1998, Kurds were still able to maintain a democratic and prosperous foundation for their region.

==== US invasion of Iraq ====
When the US invaded to oust the Iraqi government in 2003, the northern Kurdish border with Iraqi central state was moved considerably southward. This gave Kurds more access to water and oil resources, therefore increasing priorities within the region to establish steady relations with the Kurds. This new access also encouraged more investment within the region, softening political tensions and polarization. The US invaded Iraq in order to take down Saddam Hussein and dissolve any threats of weapons of mass destruction. After the invasion, however, no evidence of mass destruction weapons was found to prove the US claim. After the fall of the government, the United States government, with the help of ethnic leaders had to confront three issues: the nature of the future Iraqi government, how Shia representation was to be achieved in the government, and how Sunni re-enfranchisement was to be managed. Different opinions emerged on whether the Iraqi government should be centralized or not, how the US should respond to civil conflict between the Arabs and Kurds, and how previous promises to the Kurdish and Iraqi people would be achieved in a future state.

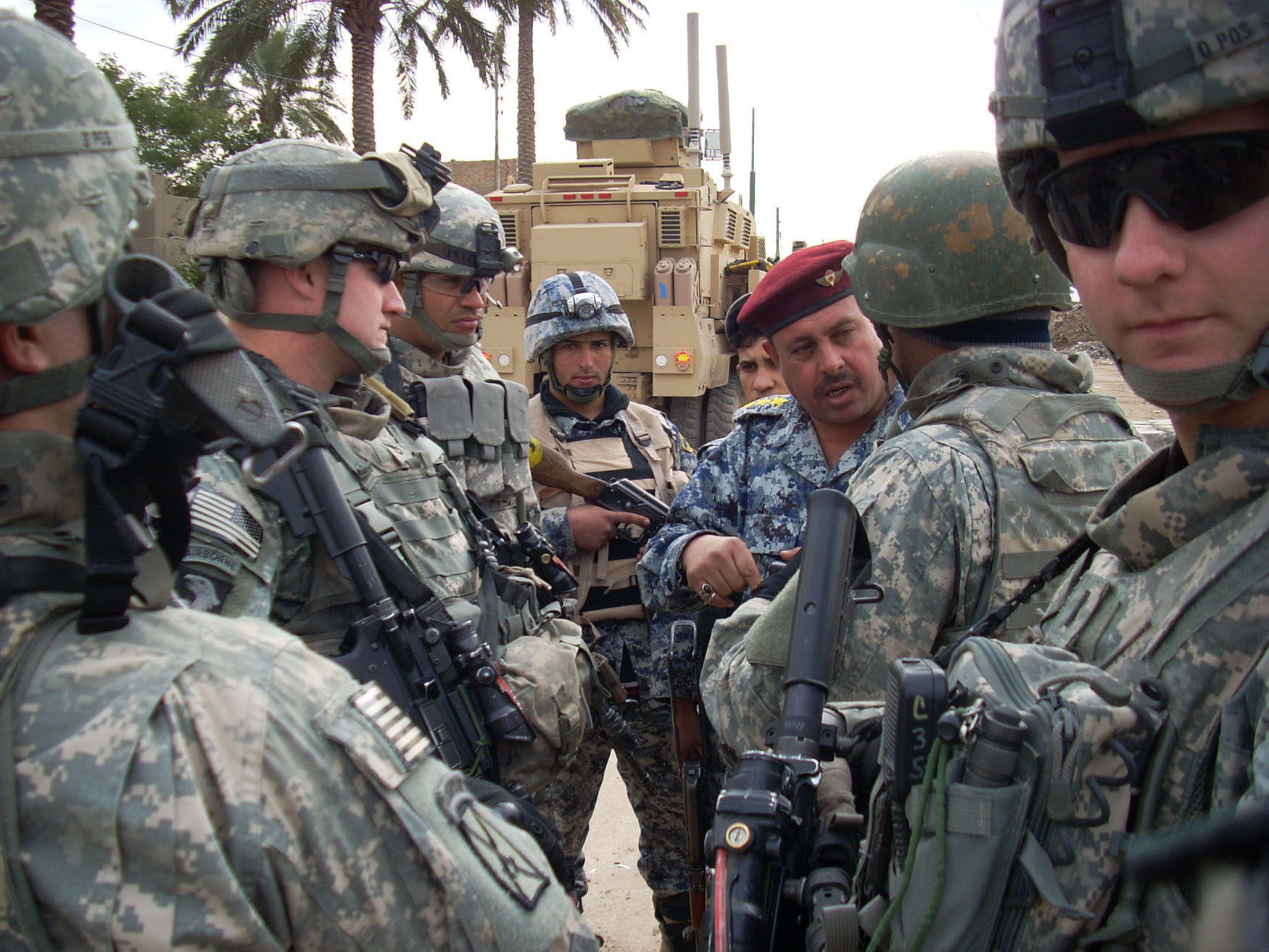
Flickr – The U.S. Army – 1st 'Panthers' Battalion prepares to replace 'Warriors,' assume mission in east Rashid

Kurdish people have played an important role in Iraqi state-building since the United States invaded in 2003. Many Kurds seek to build an autonomous federal state in the post-Hussein era, however, a solution for Kurdish problems in Iraq was not even mentioned in the 2004 UN resolution that established Iraq's interim government.

== Politics ==
Factors that play into their future include Kurdish diversity and factions, Kurdish relationships with the United States, Iraq's central government, and neighboring countries, previous political agreements, disputed territories, and Kurdish nationalism.

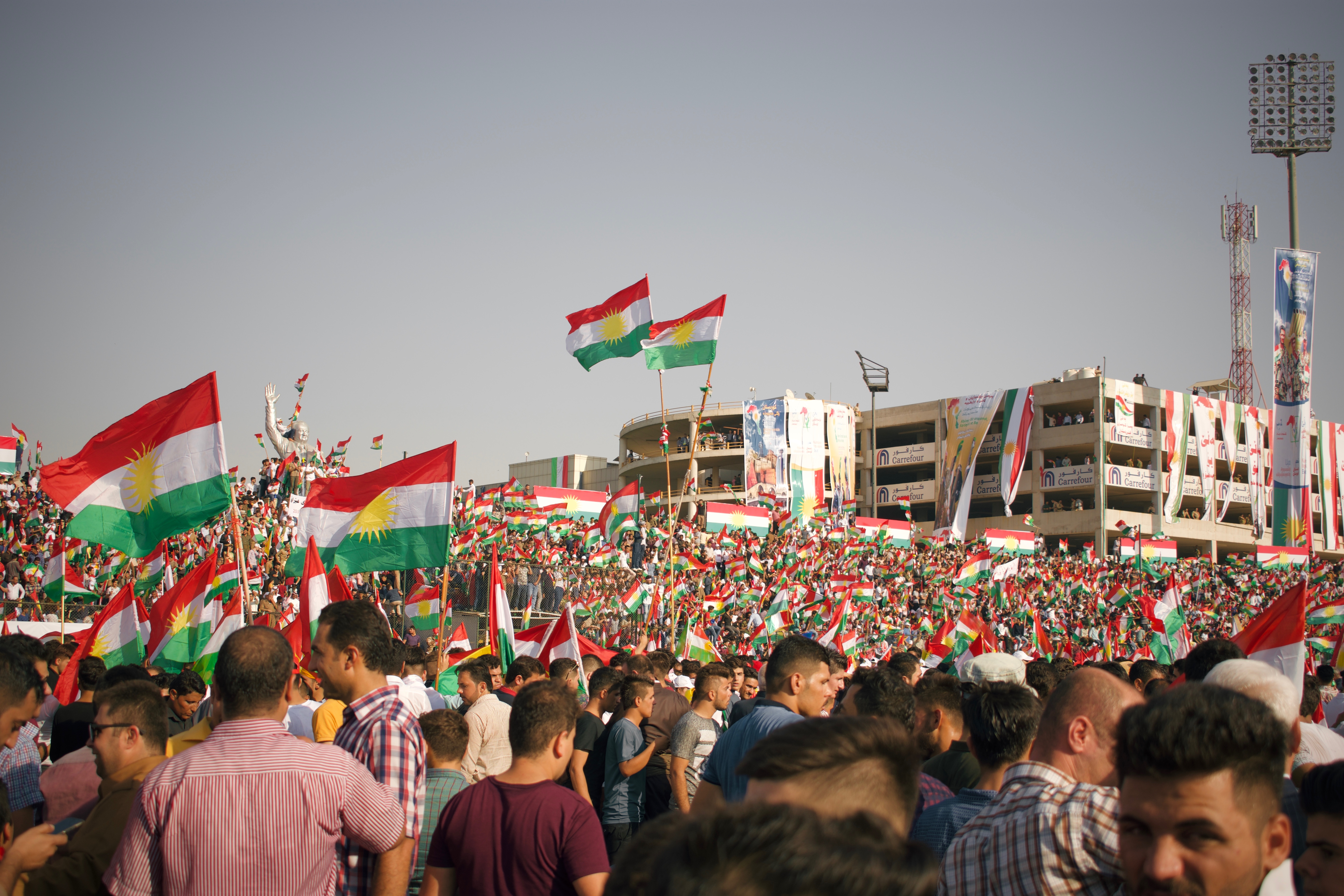
Pro-independence rally in Erbil in September 2017

Disputed internal boundaries have been a core concern for Arabs and Kurds, especially since US invasion and political restructuring in 2003. Kurds gained territory to the south of Iraqi Kurdistan after the US-led invasion in 2003 to regain what land they considered historically theirs.

One of the major problems in trying to implement Article 140 was a discrepancy in the definition of 'disputed area'. The article only refers to regions that would go through this normalization process as "Kirkuk and other disputed area". In 2003 Kurdish negotiator Mahmud Othman suggested that Kurdish majority areas below the Green line be attached to the KRG immediately, and 'mixed areas' should be questioned on a case-by-case basis. Sunnis felt as if Kurds should gain no additional land as a result of the US invasion. Reattaching Kirkuk districts to reflect the 1975 boundaries posed many problems to Iraqis and brought along unintended consequences.

=== 2014 Northern Iraq offensive ===
Disputed areas in Iraq prior to the 2014 Northern Iraq offensive. Disputed and part of the Kurdish Regional Government since 1991. Disputed and under the control of central government.

During the 2014 Northern Iraq offensive, Iraqi Kurdistan seized the city of Kirkuk and the surrounding area, as well as most of the disputed territories in Northern Iraq.

=== Article 140 ===
Article 140 of the 2005 Iraqi constitution vowed to place disputed areas under the jurisdiction of the Kurdistan Regional Government (KRG) by the end of 2007. The three phases that were going to aid this process were normalization, census, and referendum. The normalization phase was supposed to undo the 'Arabization' policies Kurds faced from 1968 to 2003 that were designed to alter the demographic in the city of Kirkuk and other disputed areas to favor the Arab population. These policies included deportation, displacement, house demolition, and property confiscation. Institutionalized boundaries as a result of past gerrymandering were also to be reversed. After this normalization process, a census would talk place and the populace would choose to be governed by either the KRG or Baghdad.

Article 140 was not implemented by 2007. At this time the Presidency Council also recommended to reattach all previously detached districts of Kirkuk. The Chemchamal and Kalar districts that were allocated to Sulaymaniyah Governorate in 1976 were to be returned to Kirkuk. Kifri, annexed to the Diyala governorate in 1976 was to be reattached, although it had been under Kurdish control since 1991. Lastly, the Tuz district would be reattached from the Salah ad-Din district. In 2008, the 140 Committee announced inaction on these initiatives.

In 2008, the Iraqi, Kurdish and US governments came to the consensus that these types of reparations to the Kurdish people would not be able to be carried out without further negotiations and political agreements on boundaries. The US government faced many problems trying to implement Article 140. This was not an ideal form of reparation for many Kurds. After being displaced, many formerly Kurdish regions lacked in development and agricultural upkeep. Educational and economic opportunities were often greater for Kurds outside of these disputed territories, so many people did not want to be forced to return.

=== 2017 Kurdish Independence Referendum ===
On September 25, 2017, an independence referendum was held for the Kurdistan region. According to the electrical commission, 92% of those who cast their ballot (including both Kurds and non-Kurds) supported the secession of Kurdistan. Despite the overwhelming support from the 72.61% voter turnout, the Iraqi Supreme Court ruled the vote unconstitutional. Internationally, the move to gain independence was overwhelmingly opposed with the UN security council suggesting it may lead to further destabilization.

== Culture and diversity ==
=== Religion ===
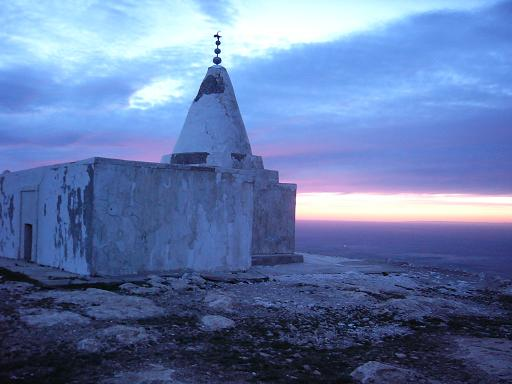
Yazidi temple

Before the spread of Islam, many Kurds were followers of Zoroastrianism, Mithraism, or local pagan beliefs. Kurds were assimilating these religious practices into their cultural domain as early as 800 BCE. Arab conquests, however, began in the seventh century AD, eventually overpowering Kurdish resistance. Over time, Sunni Islam became the dominant religion of the Kurdish people, following the Shafi school. There is a significant minority Shia population following the Ja'fari school, called the Feylis who live in the central and eastern parts of Iraq. Their population is estimated to be around 1,500,000 to 2,500,000 in Iraq which is about 30% of the Iraqi Kurdish population. They are known for being very wealthy businessmen, merchants, politicians, highly educated and have dominated the politics and economy of Iraq especially during the 60s and 70s. Unlike the other sunni Kurds the feylis speak the southern Kurdish dialect which is closer to the Persian language. The feylis have been a subject of discrimination by their fellow sunni Kurds and even sunni Arabs for belonging to the Shiite faith, the common terms such as “Safavid”, ”Rafidah”, “Persian” or “Ajam” is used against the feylis to degrade them. Despite that many feylis are secular or moderate, the alienation by their fellow sunni Kurds have pushed them closer to the Shia regime in Iran. The Feyli Kurdish merchant establishment have very close ties with the Shiite clergy, for example the merchants helps the clergy by financing the opening of new mosques and other religious affairs. Islam is thought to be a religion of governance as well as spirituality, Kurds make sure to keep both their spiritual identity and national identity strong. Within Shia Kurds, there was a minority of Kurds who practiced Zaydism, before Zaydism declined. Today, many Muslim Kurds consider themselves religious when it comes to adhering to the call to prayer as they often try to keep up and pray all five prayers, also secondary practices of Islam have a stronghold in Kurdish culture. Such as, following Islamic food restrictions, refraining from the consumption of alcohol, circumcising male newborns, and wearing a veil are all very popular customs and rituals among Kurds.

=== Language ===
The Kurds in Iraq traditionally spoke a variety of Kurdish dialects (Kurmanji, Sorani, Southern) as well as Gorani. In May 1931 the Kingdom of Iraq, still a part of the British Empire, issued a Language Law declaring Kurdish language of instruction in elementary and primary schools and the official language in several Qadhas in the Liwas Mosul, Arbil, Kirkuk and Suleimanya But the Language Law was not fully implemented, in the Governmental Offices in the Liwas of Kirkuk and Mosul the law has never been applied and following the release in independence of the Kingdom of Iraq by the British Empire in 1932, schools and Governmental Administration were arabized in the Qadhas of Kirkuk and Mosul. In Arbil of the 15 issues of the official gazette eight issues were in Arabic, six in Turkish and only one in Kurdish. By 1943 protests broke out either demanding the acknowledging of Kurdish as an official language or the independence of Kurdistan. Language has been foundational to the building of a national identity in Iraqi Kurdistan, for the vast majority of Kurdish peoples speak Kurdish. Kurdish belongs to the Iranian language group and is rooted in the Indo-European family of languages. Sorani and Kurmanji are the main two Kurdish dialects, so internal language factions are not common. Kirmanji was the favored dialect up until the World Wars, but by the 1960s Sorani became the dominant dialect among Iranian and Iraqi Kurds. Known Kurdish tribes in Iraq included the Barzani, who spoke Kurmanji, the Jaff, who spoke Sorani, and the Suramiri, who spoke Southern Kurdish. A problem among Kurdish people is that they do not have a unified script for their language. Iranian and Iraqi Kurds have modified the Perso-Arabic alphabet, and Turkish Kurds use a Latinized alphabet. This creates unity within modern political borders but strains relations and effective communications transnationally. This lack of unity in scripture parallels Kurdish cultural history, for isolated Kurdish mountain tribes were often nomadic and therefore had a very limited written tradition.

After political changes in Iraq in the 1990s, however, Kurdish was increasingly used in the regional administration and education system, given their greater autonomy.

=== Political parties ===
PDK Kurdistan

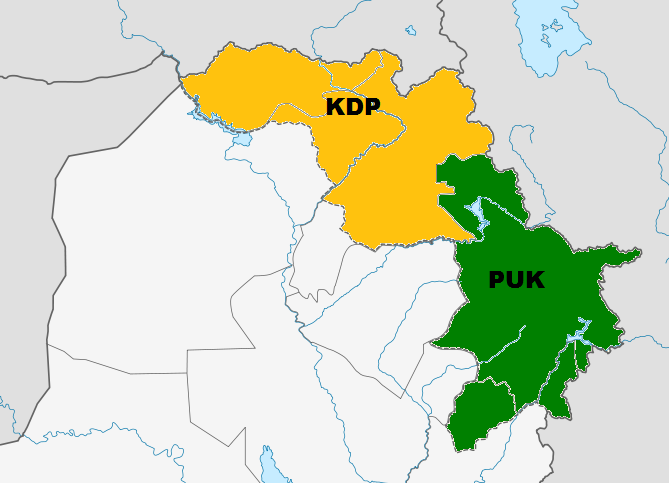
KDP and PUK-controlled areas of Kurdistan

A major weakness of Kurdish national cohesiveness has been the strength of tribal and regional factions, often resulting in strong breaks between political parties. The Kurdistan Democratic Party (KDP), founded by Masoud Barzani, leans toward conservative nationalism and has a strong presence in the north. Given their geographic location, they have historically relied on Turkey for international leverage. Jalal Talabani's Patriotic Union of Kurdistan (PUK) has aligned itself with Marxist ideals during their liberation struggle and has a stronghold in the southern Iraqi Kurdistan. They have tended to seek support from Iran and Syria. Throughout the 1990s a continuous power struggle ensued over political representation in parliament and oil revenues, resulting in an armed conflict in 1994. Fighting again broke out in 1996, the KDP looked for assistance from the central Iraqi government and the PUK sought out support for the United States. This clash divided the two rival zones into "Barzanistan" and "Talabanistan", establishing two administrations, cabinets, parliaments, and state flags. Political party infighting ruined a chance for the Kurdish peoples to unify and establish an autonomous state, completely separate from the Iraqi central government. Within a factionalized atmosphere, other groups established a presence, such as the Turkey-based Kurdistan Workers' Party (PKK), radical Islamist groups, and other Turkish political groups. The PKK has been a major party seeking state autonomy and cultural, linguistic, and ethnic rights for Kurds in Turkey.

Kurdish leaders in Iraq have pushed for the prosperity of divided local governments rather than an independent state; this is because leadership is derived from tribal legitimacy, rather than political institutions. Talabani and Barzani, for instance, did not come from the most populous Kurdish tribe, but rather from well-organized tribes. This could be an inhibitor to democracy in the region since those trying to preserve the status quo hold power but do not represent the majority.

From 1986 to the present, Turkey has held different alliances with the KDP and PUK parties of Iraqi Kurdistan. Turkey has protected the KDP from the PKK and PUK. Turkey has also attacked the political parties PUK and PKK, while keeping good relations with the KDP, partially for access to cheap Iraqi oil. The KDP holds the representation of tribes along the Turkish border, so favorable relations with them ensures trading for Iraqi goods. Turkey then shifted its relationships to favor the now social-democratic PUK party. Since this party sat in the southern region of northern Iraq, it had stronger relations with the central Iraqi government. After the independence referendum of 2017 the relations between Turkey and political parties in the KRG cooled down.

== National identity ==
Throughout the 1990s, when Kurds were given regional control after the Gulf War and a no-fly zone was established, a stronger Kurdish identity began to form. This has stemmed from increased international support and the pull-out of the Iraqi central government from Iraqi Kurdistan. The Kurdish language crossed over into the public sphere, taught and spoken in schools, universities, the administration, and the media. There has also been an influx of national symbols, including the Kurdish flag, a Kurdish hymn, and public recognition of the Kurdish people.

Development of Kurdish infrastructure has also become an integral aspect of their successful autonomy. Previously dependent on the socioeconomic infrastructure of Baghdad, Kurds were able to efficiently build up their region, physically and politically, from scratch. They built a fully functioning autonomous government, free from Ba'athist Iraq. They were able to manage local governments, establish free and active Kurdish political parties, and institutionalize a Kurdish parliament. With these developments, the de facto Kurdish government gained recognition for the first time in the international sphere. They have quasi-official representation in Turkey, Iran, France, Britain, and the United States.

Though Kurdish people had some success in forming a national identity, there have been factors that have stunted its growth. Under the state of Iraq, Kurds were subjugated to the nationalism process for all Iraqis, given the arbitrary state lines. Kurds were starting to think of themselves as Iraqis, rather than focus on their collective development as Kurds. Nationalism was also hindered by divisions of tribes, languages, and geography that prevented the Kurdish people from identifying completely as one unit. No leader has yet to rise above this tribal status and the infighting hurts those fighting for Kurdish autonomy because they are divided by other factions or political boundaries. For example, during the Iran–Iraq War, from 1980 to 1988, Turkey supported one Iraqi Kurdish group over another in order to play the Iraqi Kurds off against Turkey's own rebellious Kurds.

Technology and telecommunications have helped Kurds to establish an ethno-national group, or self-defined national identity. Though this has developed a sense of pride and definition across political boundaries, it reveals a less promising scenario of Kurdish statehood. It has disclosed disparities across countries about which Kurdish populations are gaining international support and relief. For Iraqi Kurds, this international network was established after the Gulf War of 1991. They had new forms of financial and political support as well as the resources and the legal geographic space to advance their nationalist agenda. This access allowed Kurdish language publications, texts, educational programs, and cultural organizations to flourish—benefits that Kurds only were experiencing within the state of Iraq and in European academic institutions. Transnational social and cultural networks for Kurds were still tied to characteristics of certain states.

== Autonomy ==
With a Kurdish diaspora, legitimizing a Kurdish state is even more unlikely. Many Turkish Kurds have migrated outside of their historic homeland in the southeast of Turkey, westward for more prosperous lives. Turkish Kurds have also come to an agreement with the Turkish government. Since the capture of their leader Abdullah Öcalan in 1999, Kurds have limited their activism to fighting for cultural, social and educational rights within the state of Turkey. Due to Turkey's pending EU application, Turkey has been moving to grant these rights. With this improved relationship, Turkish Kurds have accepted their place within the Turkish state. This is just one instance of how Kurds are focusing on improving their livelihood within already established state lines rather than pushing for a restructuring of political borders in the Middle East. Though Iraqi Kurds have the greatest opportunity to push for autonomy because of the Iraqi state's government restructuring, Kurds in neighboring countries do not have the leverage to push for the independence that would threaten pre-existing states.

Even at a crossroads for the political future of Iraqi Kurds, Barzani and Talabani have both opted for establishing a federalist system within post-Saddam Iraq in order to ensure the future wellbeing of the Kurdish people.

On 1 July 2014, Massud Barzani announced that "Iraq's Kurds will hold an independence referendum within months." After previously opposing the independence for Iraqi Kurdistan, Turkey later showed signs that it could recognize an independent Kurdish state. On 11 July 2014 KRG forces seized control of the Bai Hassan and Kirkuk oilfields, prompting a condemnation from Baghdad and a threat of "dire consequences," if the oilfields were not relinquished back to Iraq's control.

In September 2017, the Kurdistan Regional Government headed by Massoud Barzani announced the intention to secede from Iraq by conducting an independence referendum. Following numerous unheeded warnings by the Iraqi government to stop, an armed conflict ensued between Iraqi governmental forces and Kurds which resulted in the defeat of the Kurds and the Iraqi government subsequently reasserting control over Kirkuk. Since then, Iraqi Kurdish officials have complained about a perceived return to Baathist Iraq-era Arabization policies in the disputed territories, including oil-rich Kirkuk.

In a leaked letter published by Al-Monitor in September 2023, Masrour Barzani, the prime minister of KRG warned about an imminent collapse of the federal model in Iraq (i.e. a return to centralism) and urged the United States to intervene, saying: "I write to you now at another critical juncture in our history, one that I fear we may have difficulty overcoming. …[W]e are bleeding economically and hemorrhaging politically. For the first time in my tenure as prime minister, I hold grave concerns that this dishonorable campaign against us may cause the collapse of … the very model of a Federal Iraq that the United States sponsored in 2003 and purported to stand by since." According to a report published in 2024 by the Washington Institute for Near East Policy, Kurdistan Region's autonomy "hangs in the balance" due to several punitive measures imposed against the former by the government of Iraq in an effort to punish it and ultimately strip it completely of its autonomy.

== Sources ==
- Bosworth, C.E (1996). The New Islamic Dynasties. Columbia University Press. ISBN 978-0-231-10714-3.
- Mazaheri, Mas‘ud Habibi; Gholami, Rahim (2008). "Ayyūbids". In Madelung, Wilferd; Daftary, Farhad (eds.). Encyclopedia Islamica. Brill. doi:10.1163/1875-9831_isla_COM_0323. ISBN 978-90-04-16860-2.
- Aḥmad, K. M. (1985). "ʿANNAZIDS". Encyclopædia Iranica. Vol. II. Fasc. 1. pp. 97–98.
- Vacca, Alison (2017). Non-Muslim Provinces under Early Islam: Islamic Rule and Iranian Legitimacy in Armenia and Caucasian Albania. Cambridge University Press. ISBN 978-1107188518.
- Kennedy, Hugh (2016). The Prophet and the Age of the Caliphates: The Islamic Near East From the Sixth to the Eleventh Century (3nd ed.). Routledge. ISBN 9781317376392.
