= Saywan Barzani =

Iraqi diplomat

Saywan Sabir Mustafa Barzani
- سيوان بارزانی
- Born: 1972 (age 53–54); Erbil, Iraq
- Citizenship: Iraq
- Education: University of Orléans (Law); University of Paris 1 Panthéon-Sorbonne (Master's, PhD)
- Occupation: Diplomat
- Years active: 2009–present
- Known for: Youngest appointed Iraqi ambassador (at age 37)
- Title: Ambassador of Iraq to Italy, Non-resident ambassador to San Marino and Malta, Permanent Representative to International Organizations in Rome
- Term: 2022–present
- Awards: Knight of Parte Guelfa (2022), Senator in Parte Guelfa (2024)

Saywan Sabir Mustafa Barzani (Arabic: سيوان بارزانی) is an Iraqi diplomat. He was elected unanimously by the Iraqi National Assembly (Parliament) on July 17, 2009, becoming the youngest ever appointed ambassador at the age of 37. He currently is the ambassador of Iraq to Italy, Non resident ambassador to The Republic of San Marino and to Malta. He is also the Permanent Representative to The International Organisations Based in Rome.

== Life and career ==
Saywan Sabir Mustafa Barzani was born in Erbil, Iraq. He moved to Iran with his family when he was a child and lived there for around 7 years. He studied Law from the University of Orléans and also holds a master's degree and a PhD in political science from the University of Paris I Panthéon – Sorbonne. Barzani is Knight of Parte Guelfa in Florence since 2022, and Senator in the same order on 2024.

From 2019 to 2022 he served as the Iraqi Ambassador to Portugal. Barzani was the Permanent Representative of the Republic of Iraq to the Organisation for the Prohibition of Chemical Weapons. The same year, he became the ambassador of Iraq to the Netherlands. Before that, he was the Iraqi ambassador to Italy.
