= Mustafa Barzani =

Kurdish nationalist and leader (1903–1979)

General Mustafa Barzani
- مسته‌فا محەممەد بارزانی; Mûstafa Mihemed Barzanî
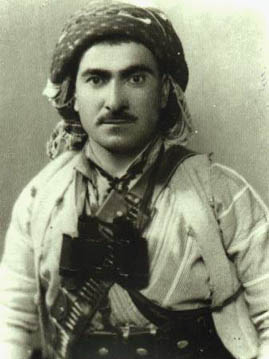
- Barzani in Kurdish clothing
- Born: 14 March 1903; Barzan, Mosul Vilayet, Ottoman Empire
- Died: 1 March 1979 (aged 75); Washington, D.C., U.S.
- Burial place: Barzan, Kurdistan Region
- Occupations: Insurgent and politician
- Term: 1946–1979
- Successor: Masoud Barzani
- Political party: Kurdistan Democratic Party (1946–1979)
- Children: 10, including Idris, Masoud, and Ubaidullah
- Family: Barzani family

Mustafa Barzani (Note: Kurdish: مسته‌فا بارزانی, romanized: Mistefa Barzanî) (14 March 1903 – 1 March 1979), also known as Mullah Mustafa, (Note: مەلا مستەفا; Mela Mistefa) was a Kurdish nationalist leader and one of the most prominent political figures in modern Kurdish politics.

In 1946, he was chosen as the leader of the Kurdistan Democratic Party (KDP) to lead the Kurdish revolt against the Kingdom of Iraq. Barzani was the primary political and military leader of the Kurdish separatist movement until his death in March 1979. He led campaigns of armed insurgency against both the Iraqi and Iranian governments.

== Early life ==
Mustafa Barzani was born in 1903 in Barzan, a village in southern Kurdistan. When Barzan was just a few months old, his home village was attacked by the Hamidiye Horsemen, an Ottoman army made up mostly of Kurdish tribal warriors and commanders, and he and his family were deported to Diyarbakır, where he spent a long time in prison. Following an insurrection launched by his tribe, he and his family were imprisoned, when Barzani was only three years old. His father, grandfather, and a brother were later executed by the Ottoman authorities for other insurrections.

At an early age he was sent by his older brother Sheikh Ahmed Barzani to join with about twenty men the revolt of Kurdish chiefs of Az Zibar against the British in Iraq. About a hundred fighters managed to ambush the British diplomat J.H.H. Bill and his company and the group was divided into two. Bill was killed with three others, while two local Kurdish tribesmen were spared. After the revolt resulted in a raid on Akre, the contingent of Barzani returned to their homeland. The British did not let such an attack on their authority go unpunished and destroyed the houses of the Zibari chiefs as well as the houses of the Barzanis. In 1919, as a boy, he participated in Mahmud Barzanji revolts against the British. As an envoy of his brother, he had contact with Sheikh Said.

In 1931 he followed his older brother, the Barzani chieftain (sheikh) Ahmed Barzani, who led an insurrection against Baghdad's attempts to break up tribal power in the Kurdish regions of Iraq. The insurrection began when Sheikh Ahmed had entered into a feud with a neighboring tribal chieftain in Baradost after the latter attacked Sheikh Ahmed for heresy, prompting Iraq to intervene as they had intended to check the Barzani tribe before then. Iraq received help from its British allies, who engaged in aerial warfare against territories in rebellion. The aerial bombardments led to widespread damage and setbacks, leading Sheikh Ahmed to surrender to Turkish forces on the then-contested border with Turkey in June 1932, while Mustafa Barzani and a brother Muhammad Sadiq continued fighting for another year. On the advice of Sheikh Ahmed, Mustafa Barzani surrendered to Iraq. But in 1939 he was involved in the formation of the political party Hewa (Hope), the first Kurdish political party in Iraq.

Mustafa Barzani was kept under surveillance until 1943, when he again broke free from his exile in Sulaymaniyah as Iraq underwent the effects of World War II. Baghdad again utilized tribal rivalries to defeat Barzani, sending him, Sheikh Ahmad, and about three thousand followers fleeing across the border to Iran, entering Oshnavieh in October 1945, where Kurdish nationalists under the guidance of the Soviet Union were establishing a new Kurdish state. Despite differences between Qazi Muhammad and Mustafa Barzani, the arrival of Barzani's forces gave a boost to the ability of the nationalists to assert control over the region.

== Early political career ==
His political career began in 1939, when he came into contact with the Kurdish nationalist Hiwa Party, which, in turn, was interested in collaborating with Barzani to gain influence over the traditional tribal milieu. In 1943, Barzani, now the official leader of his tribe, rebelled against the Iraqi central government.

=== Republic of Kurdistan in Mahabad ===
In December 1945 the Kurdish Republic of Mahabad was declared by Qazi Muhammad, the leader of the Kurdistan Democratic Party of Iran in Mahabad (northwestern Iran) which was under Soviet military control. Barzani was appointed as the Minister of Defense and commander of the Kurdish army in the Republic of Kurdistan. As Iranian forces began to engage the forces of the Republic of Mahabad, Barzani quickly proved his reputation as a capable commander with his forces inflicting defeats on the Iranian divisions, and was one of the few who did not surrender or defect to the advancing Iranian forces.

In May 1946 the Soviet troops were withdrawn from Iran and all support for the Republic of Kurdistan was cut, in accordance with the Yalta Agreement. In December of that year Mahabad was finally overrun by Iranian troops, which was followed with harsh punishments for those involved; the president of the Republic Qazi Muhammad was hanged in public in the "Çwar Çira" square in Mahabad city along with his brother and a cousin, and a number of libraries containing Kurdish texts were burned.

=== Exile in the Soviet Union ===
Barzani and his followers arrived in the Armenian SSR and were put in a camp near Nakhchevan. After appealing to the Soviet Union to help them, Barzani and his followers were transferred to the Azerbaijani SSR, kept in camps near and around Baku. Barzani met with Azerbaijan Communist Party officials, who under orders from Moscow were told to help the Kurds.

In November 1947, Barzani met for the first time Mir Jafar Baghirov, the First Secretary of the Azerbaijan Communist Party, to discuss what the Kurds could do in the Soviet Union. Barzani's followers were organized into a military regiment and received training in military tactics and politics, as well as education to learn to read and write Kurdish.

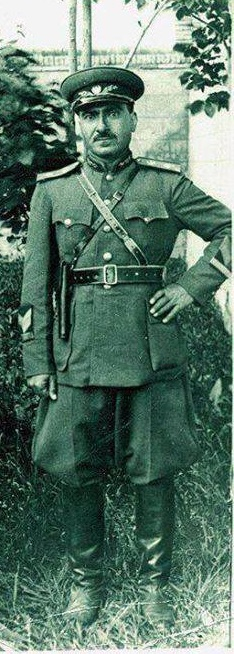
Mustafa Barzani, 1947

On 19 January 1948, a conference was held gathering Kurds from Iraq and Iran in Baku, where Barzani outlined a plan for the Kurdish movement. This prompted Iran to again demand that the Soviet Union extradite Barzani and his followers to Iran to stand trial, which the Soviet Union rejected. Barzani however fast ran into problems with Baghirov due to differences and stances towards the Kurdish movement. As Baghirov was connected to Lavrentiy Beria, this gave Baghirov a lot of power in regional affairs, leading to Barzani requesting his followers be transferred out of Azerbaijan fearing Baghirov would act against them.

Barzani and the others were transferred to the Uzbek SSR in August 1948, but Baghirov's disputes with Barzani were not forgotten. Despite assurances from both the Secretary-General of the Communist Party of Uzbekistan Usman Yusupov, Baghirov's rivalry with Barzani spilled over into Uzbekistan and resulted in Barzani himself and much of his followers to be separate and spread across the country to do hard labor. For the following three years, Barzani was separated from his followers, prompting them to engage in sit-ins and strikes demanding they be reunited and their cause recognized.

Barzani sent numerous letters to Moscow, addressing them to Joseph Stalin himself, requesting that he and his followers be treated better and reunited. Only one of these letters reached the Kremlin and shortly afterwards in March 1951, Soviet officials began investigations to address the concerns of Barzani and his followers. The committee found that Barzani and his followers were unfairly treated, and in August 1951 the Soviet government reunited Barzani and the other Kurds, giving Mustafa Barzani a residence in Tashkent while the rest were given homes in a small community outside of Tashkent. All of them were provided with jobs, education, training, and social services that was given to other Soviet citizens.

Barzani would later meet with Soviet figures like Georgy Malenkov and Nikita Khrushchev in May 1953 after the death of Stalin to ensure that the Soviets would continue helping him and his followers. Shortly afterwards, Soviet officials moved Barzani to a residence in Moscow and enrolled him in the Party Higher School.

Rumors also spread that Barzani was given a rank in the Red Army, which appears to have been false. Recounting the story years later to Yevgeny Primakov, Barzani recalled that he had bought a uniform at a Voentorg (military supplies) store while in Tashkent in 1951, and took a picture of himself wearing it. This picture somehow fell into the hands of British intelligence, which was the source of rumors of Barzani having been inducted as a member of the Soviet Red Army.

During his time in exile, the Kurdish Democratic Party was founded in Iraq, holding its first Congress on 16 August 1946, in Baghdad, electing Mustafa Barzani as its president. The party would later rename itself to the Kurdistan Democratic Party in January 1953 during its Third Congress.

== Iraq and revolutions ==
Mustafa Barzani, following his return to Iraq in 1958, would engage in numerous insurgencies against Baghdad, often seeking and gaining support from the KGB, CIA, Mossad, MI6 and SAVAK, as well as support from Syria and Jordan depending on which country was opposed to the government in Baghdad at the time, taking advantage of the complexities of the Cold War in the Middle-East.

=== Return from exile and Qasim ===
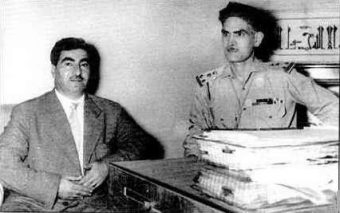
Mustafa Barzani with Abd al-Karim Qasim

Following the Republican coup against the Hashemite monarchy, the Kurds were granted more rights. In the provisional Iraqi constitution on 27 July 1958 was included that Kurds and Arabs were partners of the same nation. Following, several Kurds were appointed into high military ranks and Barzani was invited to return to Iraq. In October 1958, Barzani and his followers returned from the Soviet Union, and Barzani quickly established warm ties with Qasim. Qasim hoped to use Barzani as a potential ally in the power struggles in Iraq, as Qasim faced considerable resistance from more nationalist minded Arab officers and intellectuals in the country. Mustafa Barzani faced similar challenges within the KDP, with divisions rising over land reform, political position, and alliances with other parties in Iraq such as the Iraqi Communist Party. Barzani quickly asserted control over the KDP, ousting the General-Secretary Ibrahim Ahmad and replacing him with the pro-Communist Hamza Abdullah in January 1959 and cementing ties with the ICP.

Along with the Communists, Barzani and the KDP sided with Qasim during an uprising of Ba'athists and other Arab Nationalists in Mosul in March 1959, entering into the city to fight off the insurrection. Following a deadly riot instigated by leftists in Kirkuk in July 1959, Qasim denounced the ICP and Barzani followed suit, seeing the ICP as a rival in northern Iraq. Barzani severed ties with the party and restored Ibrahim Ahmad to his original position and elevated Jalal Talabani to the politburo during the KDP's fourth Congress in October 1959, ending the KDP's cooperation with the ICP. While welcoming towards the break with the ICP, Ahmad however still held suspicions of Barzani and his policy for the party and remained critical of his leadership.

Qasim in time became suspicious of Barzani, worried that his increasing power in Iraqi Kurdistan could allow him to become a potential source of opposition to his power in Iraq and possibly where foreign intelligence could instigate instability in Iraq. Qasim began to capitalize on tribal divisions in the Kurdish region, focusing on those with long-time rivalries with the Barzanis such as the Zebaris and the Harki, creating tribal disputes in the autumn of 1960. Other figures within the KDP such as Ahmad and Talabani began to voice more opposition to Qasim through party publications, displeased with the lack of progress towards any autonomy for the Kurds. Qasim severed the government stipend and privileges to Barzani by early 1961, and for much of the year tensions between Barzani and Qasim grew. Qasim suspected Barzani of being a potential avenue for the British to frustrate his take over of Kuwait and increased arms to pro-government tribes to keep Barzani from becoming any stronger. On 11 September 1961, Iraqi planes began bombardments on the Kurdish region following an ambush on a military convoy, and on 24 September Qasim ordered the closure of KDP. The following December, Barzani and the KDP severed its agreements with Baghdad and entered into hostilities with the government.Battle of Zawita Valley

Barzani attempted to gain support from the United States, alienating many Iraqi progressives and the ICP, who felt that such a move was a betrayal for everything the KDP stood for. Barzani however managed to lead the peshmerga effectively, inflicting casualties on the military to the point that Qasim offered peace twice in November 1961 and in March 1962, both times rejected by Barzani who raised autonomy requests. Such demands were unfeasible for Qasim who knew that such a concession would damage his image, and the military campaign waged on against Barzani's rebellion.

Through the rest of 1962, Barzani's campaign proved to cause Qasim's position in Baghdad to become increasingly unstable, and he directed the KDP into talks with the Ba'athists and Nasserists, the two factions most likely to succeed Qasim.

=== Military government ===
On 8 February 1963, a military coup took place which overthrew and executed Qasim. The Nasserist Colonel Abdul Salam Arif become president of Iraq and the Ba'athist General Ahmed Hassan al-Bakr become prime minister. The latter resulted in a Ba'athist domination in the government, forming the National Council of the Revolutionary Command.

Not forgetting Barzani's role in quelling the insurrection in Mosul back in 1959, as well as Barzani's contacts with foreign intelligence, the new government was suspicious towards Barzani. Mustafa Barzani and the government would attempt ineffective negotiations, and after Barzani's autonomy request which included much of Iraq's oil fields around Kirkuk and Mosul, the government moved against the KDP in northern Iraq. The campaign faced difficulties though, and allowed for President Arif's power grab in November 1963, ousting the Ba'athists from the national government.

President Arif quickly offered Barzani a truce, which he accepted. A subsequent agreement between Barzani and Arif would end hostilities between the government and the Kurds, though autonomy was not included. By this point Barzani turned his attention towards asserting his leadership over the KDP, due to the opposition from various factions, namely the one led by Talabani and Ahmad. Soon, the political divisions evolved into one that saw Barzani leading tribal and conservative elements of Kurdish society on one end with Talabani and Ahmad leading progressive minded leftist intellectual Kurds on the other. Barzani however benefited from his agreement with Arif, which secured him funds and arms from Baghdad to assert his position.

During the sixth congress of the KDP in Qala Dizeh in July 1964, Barzani moved against Talabani and Ahmad, tasking his son Idris with ejecting Talabani, Ahmad, and their supporters from the congress. The move was successful and saw Barzani's opposition flee into Iran, allowing him uncontested control of the KDP.

With his power secure in the KDP, Barzani raised the demand for autonomy to President Arif, quickly souring relations between the two. In March 1965, hostilities began between Barzani and Baghdad, leading to a massive military operation in northern Iraq that saw nearly 100,000 soldiers deployed by Iraq to fight Barzani and the Peshmerga, as well as other Kurdish factions such as the Talabani-Ahmad faction which had returned to Iraq. The operation was inconclusive, with the government unable to make any significant gains against Barzani and his forces, which were receiving supplies through the Iranian border. The war was further complicated by the winter, which played into the Peshmerga's advantage. The government again utilized divisions among the Kurds in the region, and had begun supporting the Talabani-Ahmad faction of the KDP who entered into hostilities with Barzani and his supporters. Before a major operation that was to take place in March against Barzani's headquarters near the border of Iran, President Arif died in a helicopter crash on 13 April 1966.

The death of Arif prompted a power struggle in Baghdad which gave Barzani time to reorganize, but operations resumed once more by the summer once Arif's brother, Abdul Rahman Arif, became president and vowed to continue the war. The civilian prime minister Abd ar-Rahman al-Bazzaz saw the futility of the military operation and instead proposed Barzani a peace offer, which incorporated a number of demands of the KDP, forming the "Bazzaz Declaration". Bazzaz was however forced to resign from his position in August 1966, dashing any hope for the Bazzaz Declaration to be implemented at the time.

President Arif would however recognize the troubles the war was bringing, and seeking to cement his own position in Iraq decided to visit Barzani that fall. Barzani accepted Arif's offer of a truce, recognizing the toll the war had taken on the Kurdish people by that point. During the sixth congress of the KDP held in November that year, the KDP decided to accept the terms of the Bazzazz Declaration but indicated that it would still push for autonomy.

Barzani continued to consolidate his power in Iraqi Kurdistan, which had mostly fallen out of control from Baghdad by that point. His increasing position in the region would plague Baghdad, tying up much of its forces during the Six Day War.

=== Ba'ath coup of 1968 and 1970 peace accord ===
In July 1968, the Ba'ath Party, supported by the army, overthrew the Arif government and assumed control of Iraq, returning Ahmed Hassan al-Bakr back to power. The Ba'ath realized the toll the military operations in Iraq were taking and signaled its willingness to settle the Kurdish issue peacefully. The Ba'ath initially hoped to seek an agreement with the Talabani-Ahmad faction to bypass Barzani, prompting Barzani to enter into hostilities with the government again, shelling Kirkuk in March 1969. Barzani's receipt of aid from Iran posed challenges for the Ba'ath government, complicating its military efforts in the region.

By May 1969 the government indicated its willingness to negotiate with Barzani, culminating in formal negotiations by December that year. Barzani demanded that the Ba'ath sever ties with pro-government Kurds and the Ahmad-Talabani faction, and recognize him as the sole power within the KDP, as well as terms of autonomy was also discussed. With Mahmoud Othman conducting negotiations on behalf of the KDP, and Saddam Hussein on behalf of the government, the final agreement was reached on 11 March 1970. The final terms of the agreement recognized the Kurdish people and considered Kurdish language a second official language of the republic with Arabic, along with autonomy in northern Iraq excluding Kirkuk, Khanaqin and other Kurdish cities, in exchange of full control of Iraqi army over Kurdistan.

=== Collapse of the peace accord ===
The government began reconstruction in northern Iraq and work towards creating an autonomous region, appointed five Kurdish men to junior-level ministries in the government, incorporating the Kurds along with the ICP into the National Front and provided Barzani with a stipend to manage the KDP. Ibrahim Ahmad and Jalal Talabani also reunified with the KDP. However relations quickly began to deteriorate as Barzani accused Iraq of continuing Arabification to decrease Kurdish standings in contested cities such as Kirkuk and in not being committed to a genuine autonomous zone. An assassination attempt took place against Barzani in Haji Omeran in September 1971 when Barzani received religious officials in his headquarters. The clerics had thought they were carrying suitcases with recording devices for the benefit of Baghdad, but had instead been wired with explosives. The explosion did not kill Barzani but killed others participating in the meeting, and in the confusion Peshmerga guards rushed in and killed the clerics. The government drivers who drove the clerics tried to salvage the assassination and tossed a grenade, killing a Peshmerga and wounding twelve, but missing Barzani, before they themselves were shot and killed. Although the conspirators were not captured, Barzani attributed responsibility for the attack to Saddam Hussein. who admitted to knowing about the assassination in 1983 and was sad that it was unsuccessful.

Following disputes with the Ba'ath regime, Barzani maintained open borders with Iran, allowing the continued flow of arms and supplies, which increased following the Soviet-Iraqi Treaty of Friendship in April 1972 once the United States was concerned about Iraq entering into the Soviet sphere like Syria. Israel also increased support to Barzani hoping to frustrate the Ba'ath in Iraq. These actions strengthened Barzani's forces but led to criticism from some factions within the KDP and leftist groups supporting Kurdish causes in Iraq. Among the defectors from the KDP was Barzani's own son Ubeydullah who defected from the movement and preferred to cooperate with the regime in Baghdad. Through much of 1973, Barzani began to rebuild and reorganize the Peshmerga in anticipation of another conflict with Baghdad.

On 11 March 1974, the Ba'ath government passed the autonomy law which it presented to Barzani for approval. With Kirkuk not included and his faith in the Ba'ath for a genuine autonomy low, Barzani rejected the agreement. Joining his son Ubeydullah, a number of members of the KDP, angered with Barzani's opening towards the United States, Israel and Iran, and the perceived betrayal of KDP's socialist origins, defected to Baghdad.

=== Renewed hostilities and defeat ===
The 1975 Algiers Agreement was signed between Iran and Iraq in March during an OPEC conference in Algiers, mediated by Algerian President Houari Boumediène and thus ending the long-running feud between the two states over the Shatt al-Arab and other border disputes, with the US Secretary of State Henry Kissinger seeing it as necessary realpolitik to preserve stability in the Middle-East and close opportunities for the Soviet Union to exploit against Iran. The agreement stipulated that Iran end support for the peshmerga as well as no longer transporting supplies sent from other countries, which spelled the end for Barzani's rebellion as it could no longer keep the peshmerga supplied. On 23 March, just a few days after the Algiers Agreement was finalized, Barzani and nearly 100,000 followers left Iraq for Iran, ending the insurrection against Iraq, and allowing the Ba'ath Party to implement its assimilation policies towards the Kurds. Ahmad and Talabani, along with their supporters, later established the Patriotic Union of Kurdistan in June 1975, criticizing Barzani and KDP for what they described as "the inability of the feudalist, tribalist, bourgeois, rightist and capitulationist Kurdish leadership".

== Exile and death ==
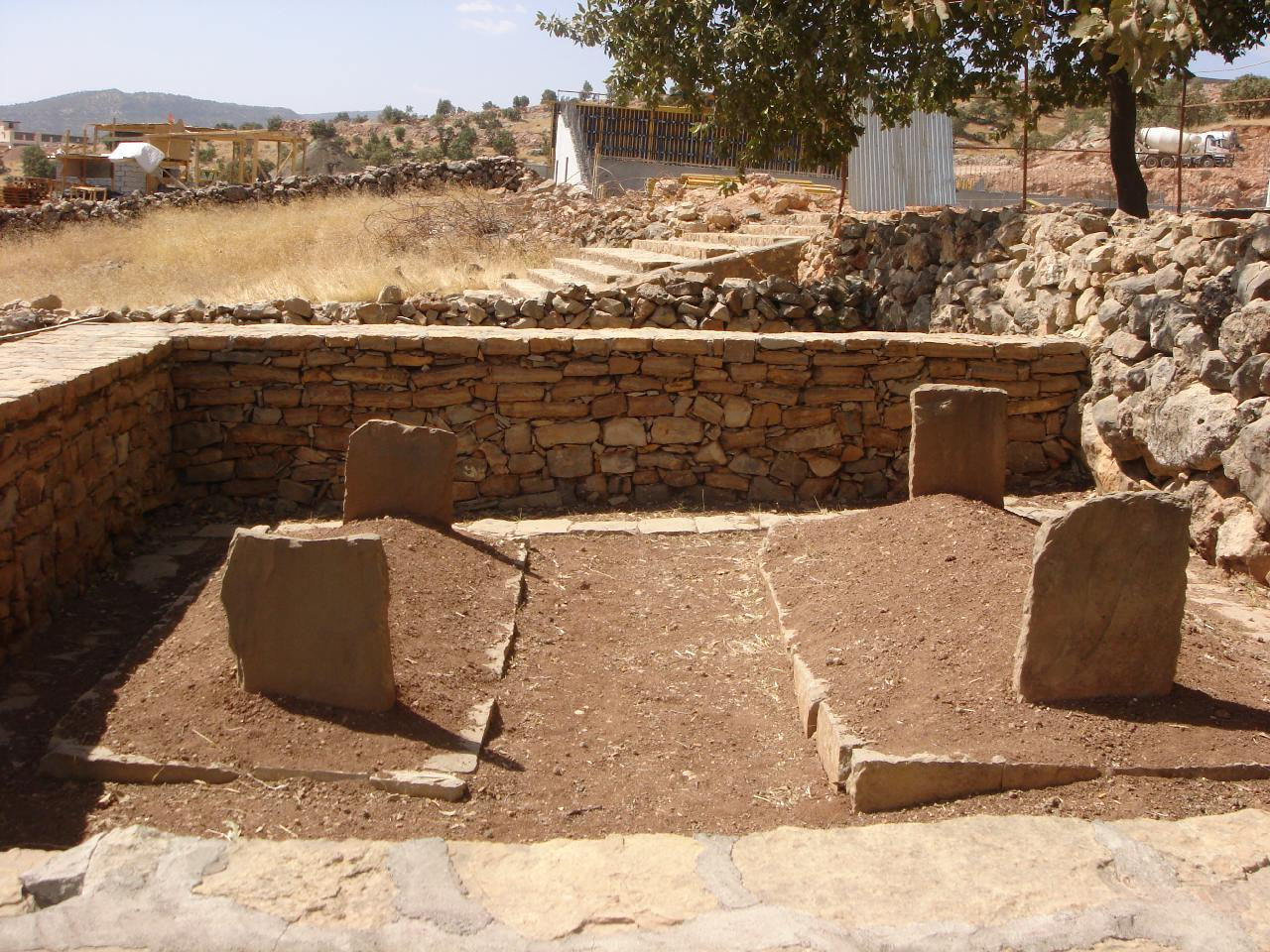
Tombs of Barzani and his son Idris Barzani

Barzani and his family were settled near Tehran in Karaj. The KDP went through a chaotic period as it attempted to reorganize itself in face of the defeat at the hands of the Ba'ath in Iraq. Barzani and his aides continued trying to get support from the United States, seeing that the Soviet Union had settled for amicable relations with the new government in Iraq. The United States' support for the Kurdish movement appeared to be primarily strategic, as it focused on countering Iraq's influence rather than advancing Kurdish nationalist goals. The findings of the Pike Commission suggested that the CIA's involvement with the Kurdish movement was primarily strategic, aiming to weaken Iraq rather than support long-term Kurdish autonomy. Barzani lived to witness significant geopolitical changes, including the overthrow of the Shah, the departure of Henry Kissinger after Gerald Ford's defeat in the 1976 U.S. presidential elections, and the death of Algerian President Houari Boumediene, all of which influenced the Kurdish struggle. Seeking to treat lung cancer, Barzani went to the United States, and died on 1 March 1979, at Georgetown University Hospital in Washington, D.C., while undergoing treatment while his sons Masud and Idris Barzani then took over the leadership of the KDP. He was buried in Iranian Kurdistan in Oshnavieh after his body was flown back from the United States.

In October 1993, Barzani's remains were brought across the border from Iran to Iraqi Kurdistan, to be reburied in his hometown of Barzan.

== Legacy ==
His son, Massoud Barzani, was the leader of the KDP and was re-elected as the President of the Iraqi Kurdistan region with 66% of the popular vote in July 2009. A grandson, Nechirvan Barzani, the son of Idris Barzani, was the prime minister of Iraqi Kurdistan.

Molla Mustafa Barzani was accused by various quarters, not least by Jalal Talabani, of having tied the national movement of Iraqi Kurdistan too closely to tribal structures and of acting solely to gain power for himself. However, due to his charisma and inflexibility, many Kurds consider him a prominent figure in the Kurdish independence movement.

Mustafa Barzani has a high position among Kurdish nationalists and is an example to Kurdish nationalists. He is considered and respected by the Kurds as the great guide and ancestor of the Kurds.

== Gallery ==
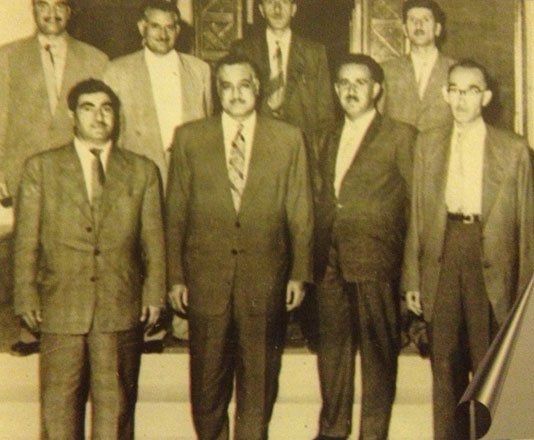
Mustafa Barzani with Egyptian President Gamal Abdel Nasser

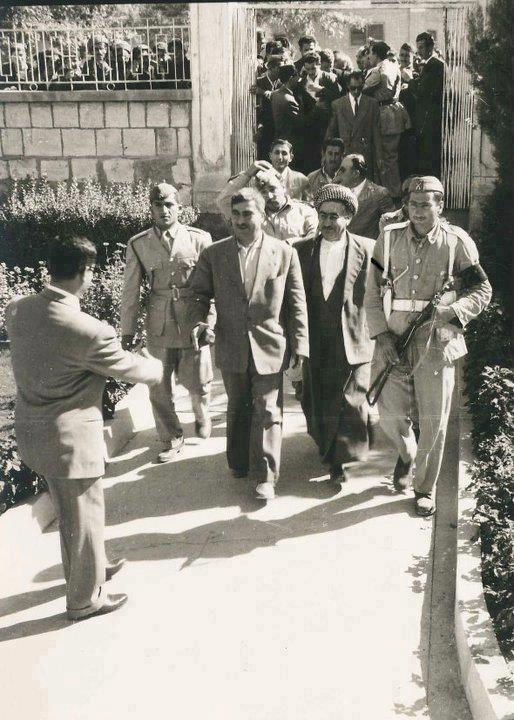
Mustafa Barzani in 1958

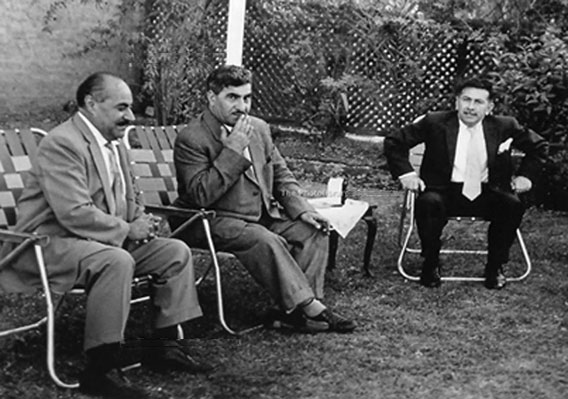
Mustafa Barzani in Baghdad in 1959

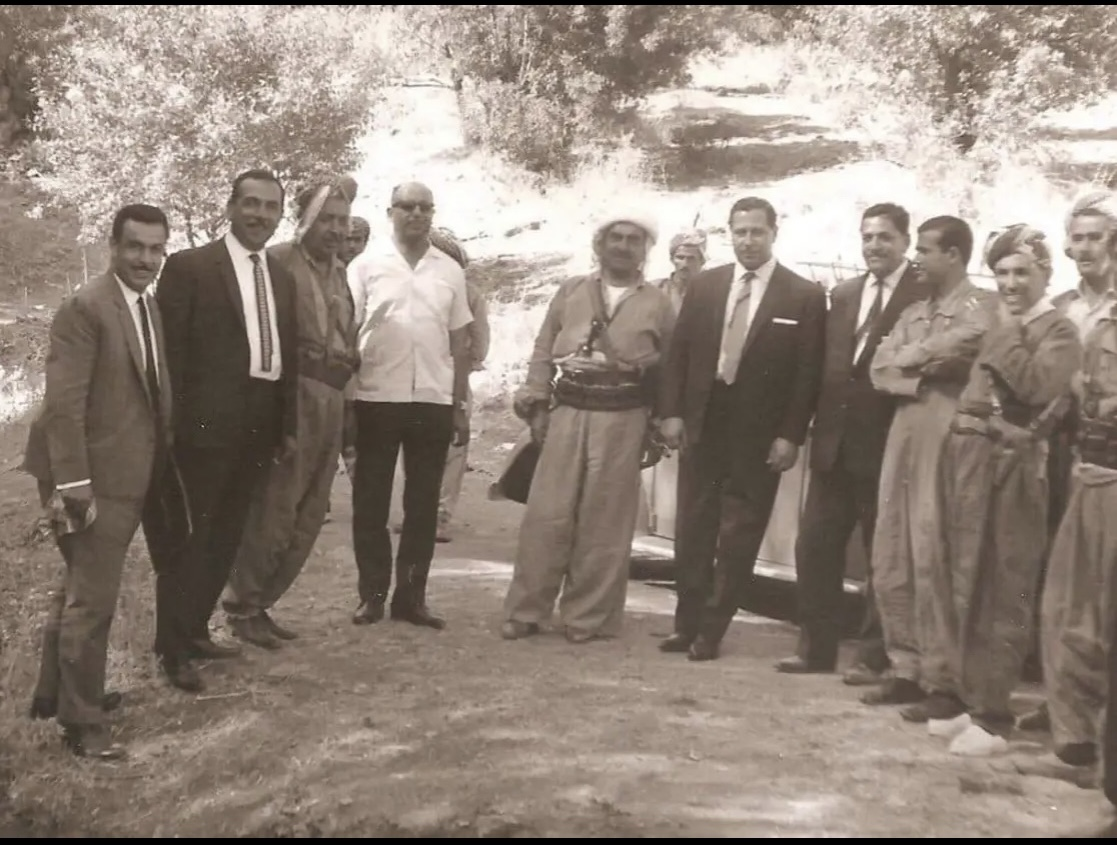
Left to right: Mohsin Dizayee, Nafez Jalal, Kaka Ziad Koya, Kemal Mustapha Kerkuki Turkman, Mustafa Barzani, Shafiq Agha, Ali Ko

== See also ==
- Masoud Barzani
- Ahmed Barzani
- Iraqi Kurdistan
- Barzani Family
- Battle of Zawita Valley

== Sources ==
- Barzani, Massoud, and Ahmed Ferhadi (2004). Mustafa Barzani and the Kurdish Liberation Movement, 1931–1961. New York: Palgrave Macmillan. ISBN 978-0-312-29316-1.
- Lawrence, Quil (2008). Invisible Nation: How the Kurds' Quest for Statehood is Shaping Iraq and the Middle East (1st U.S. ed. ed.). New York: Walker & Co. ISBN 0-8027-1611-3.
- McDowall, David (2005). A Modern History of the Kurds (3. revised and upd. ed., repr. ed.). London [u.a.]: Tauris. ISBN 978-1-85043-416-0.
