= Idris Barzani =

Kurdish politician in Iraq (1944–1987)

- ئیدریس بارزانی (Îdirîs Barzanî)
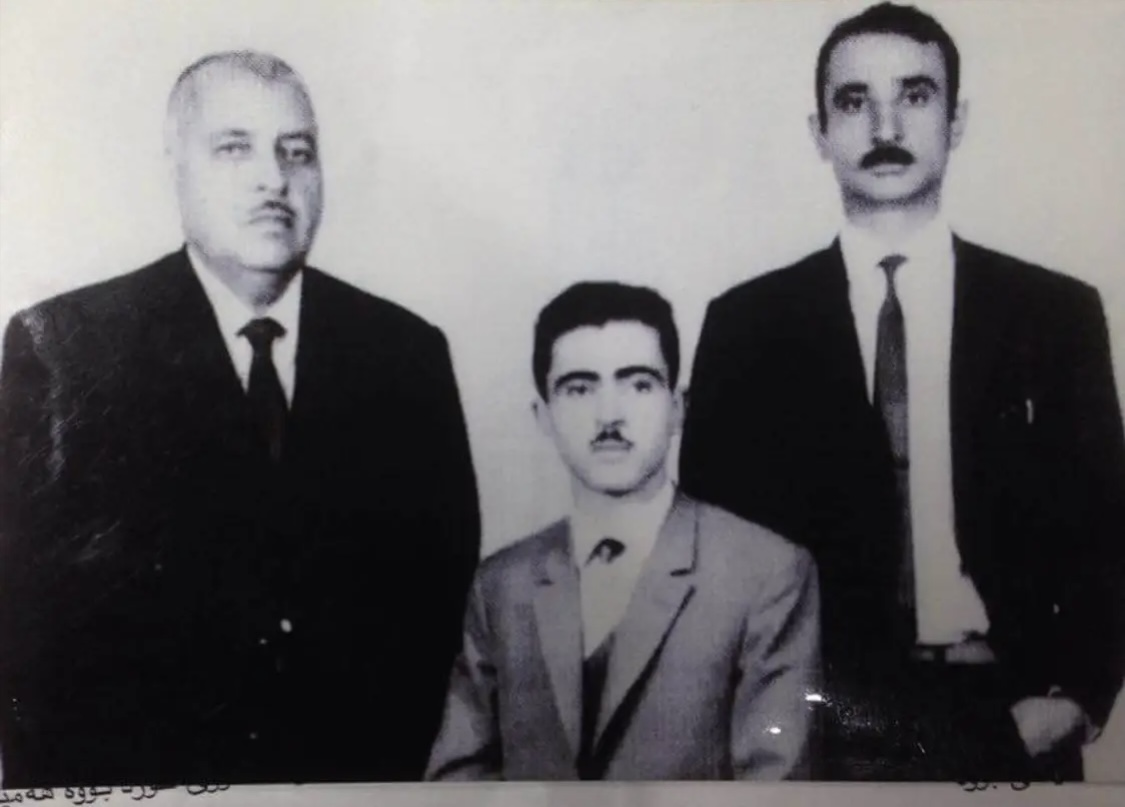
- Idris Barzani (center) with Kaka Ziad Koya (left) and Franso Hariri
- Born: 1944; Semel, Kingdom of Iraq
- Died: 31 January 1987 (aged 42–43); Urmia, Iran
- Burial place: Barzan, Kurdistan Region, Iraq
- Occupation: Politician
- Known for: Kurdish political leadership, diplomacy
- Political party: Kurdistan Democratic Party
- Children: 6, including Nechirvan Idris Barzani
- Parent: Mullah Mustafa Barzani
- Relatives: Massoud Barzani (brother)
- Family: Barzani family

Idris Barzani (Kurdish: ئیدریس بارزانی, romanized: Îdirîs Barzanî; 1944 – 31 January 1987) was a Kurdish politician in what is now the Kurdistan Region of Iraq. Born in the village of Barzan in 1944, his early life was shaped by the political upheavals of the Kurdish movement and the exile of his family following periods of conflict with the Iraqi government.

He was a senior leader and influential figure in the Kurdistan Democratic Party (KDP), participating in political and military efforts during the Kurdish struggle. Barzani played key roles in organizing Kurdish refugees, restructuring the party in the mid-1970s, and working toward Kurdish unity through the creation of umbrella organizations such as the Kurdistan Front.

Barzani was the brother of Massoud Barzani, who later became president of the Kurdistan Region, and the father of Nechirvan Barzani, its current president.

He was respected for his efforts to foster cooperation among Kurdish parties and for his diplomatic work on behalf of the KDP.

Barzani died of a heart attack on 31 January 1987 in the Silvaneh sub-district near Urmia in Iran. His remains were initially buried beside his father, the Kurdish leader Mustafa Barzani. Following the 1991 uprising and the liberation of parts of Iraqi Kurdistan, his body was repatriated to Barzan in October 1993, where it was reburied in his homeland.

Barzani was one of the most prominent political figures in Kurdish politics, spending his entire life serving the cause alongside his father and brother Massoud. He was known as a peacemaking figure among Kurdish parties after the 1975 Algiers Agreement between Shah Pahlavi and Saddam Hussein. In the 1980s, he repeatedly attempted to hold a congress to gather the Kurds and unify Kurdish political parties, but his sudden death in 1987 prevented him from achieving these goals.

== Life ==
=== Early life ===
Idris Barzani was born in 1944 in Barzan, a village in modern-day Iraqi Kurdistan, into the prominent Barzani family led by his father, Mullah Mustafa Barzani. His early childhood coincided with a turbulent period in Kurdish history, marked by repeated uprisings and displacement.

In 1946, following the establishment of the short-lived Republic of Mahabad in Iranian Kurdistan, Barzani moved with his family and thousands of Kurdish fighters (Peshmerga) to Iran, where his father played a central role in the republic's military leadership. After the collapse of the republic later that year, Idris Barzani returned with parts of his family to Barzan, while Mustafa Barzani and approximately 500 of his followers retreated north and eventually went into exile in the Soviet Union.

=== 1970 Iraqi–Kurdish Autonomy Agreement ===
On 10 March 1970, the Iraqi regime reached an agreement with the Kurds for the creation of an autonomous region in the north of the country. Barzani played a major role in this.

=== Exile, KDP, and death ===
Following the collapse of the 1975 Algiers Agreement and the subsequent defeat of the Kurdish movement, Barzani went into exile in Iran together with his family and thousands of other Kurdish families. During this period, the Kurdistan Democratic Party (KDP) faced severe organizational and political challenges as it sought to rebuild its structures after the collapse of the armed struggle against the Ba'athist government.

After the death of his father in 1979, Barzani emerged as one of the party's most influential political figures and strategists, working closely with his brother Massoud Barzani during the reorganization of the KDP and the restoration of its political presence in exile.

Barzani died of a heart attack on 31 January 1987 in the Silvaneh sub-district near Urmia in Iranian Kurdistan and was buried in Oshnavieh, Iran. Following the 1991 uprising and the establishment of Kurdish self-rule in parts of northern Iraq, his remains were transferred to Barzan in October 1993, where he was reburied.
