= Kurds in Israel =

Ethnic group

Total population
- Approximately 200,000 (2007)

Regions with significant populations
- Israel
- Approximately 200,000

Languages
- Kurdish

Religion
- Predominantly Judaism; Minority Islam

Related ethnic groups
- Kurdish Jews in Israel

Kurds in Israel refers to people of Kurdish origin residing in Israel (excluding Kurdish Jews). The Kurdish population in Israel is small and is mainly composed of individuals and families, who fled Iraq and Turkey during the Iraqi–Kurdish and the Kurdish–Turkish conflicts during the 20th century, as well as temporal residents arriving in Israel for medical care.

== Population ==
Historically, a small Arabized population of Kurdish origins exists in Galilee and Jerusalem area, though it has mostly intermixed with local Arabs; their exact numbers are not available since they are counted as ethnic Arabs in the official Israeli census. Some Arabized families of Kurdish background can still be identified by specific surnames.

The 1922 census of Palestine lists 18 Kurdish speakers in Mandatory Palestine (8 in Samaria and 10 in the Northern District), including 10 in municipal areas (1 in Haifa, 1 in Nablus, 1 in Tiberias, and 7 in Jenin).

The Kurdish population in Israel is small and is mainly composed of individuals and families, who fled Iraq and Turkey during the Iraqi–Kurdish and the Kurdish–Turkish conflicts during the 20th century. In 2006, the number of Kurdish refugees from Turkey was estimated at 200. Another estimate for both Iraqi and Turkish Kurds was 150 persons in 2007.

In March 2001, a group of 19 Kurdish men entered Israel via Lebanon, asking for asylum, but were denied. In mid-2001, a group of 42 Kurdish refugees attempted to enter Israel via Lebanon, illegally crossing the Israeli–Lebanese border, but were returned to Lebanon.

In 2007, 40 Iraqi Kurdish children, mostly from Iraqi Kurdistan, were hosted with their parents and medically treated in Israel, as part of the project initiated by Israeli Save a Child's Heart Organization (SACH). In 2013, it was reported that Israel accepted three Kurdish children from Iraqi Kurdistan for medical treatment. The children were settled into Wolfson Medical Center in Holon, southern Tel Aviv area. They were some of the 183 children with Iraqi nationality, entering Israel for medical treatment since the establishment of the program.

In January 2015, Yazidi organizations made an official request from Israeli government to absorb Yazidi refugees from Iraq. There was no official statement by Israeli government as a result, but Yazidi sources claimed that refugee absorption took place and thanked Israeli government. There was no response from Israeli Parliament members, upon asking them on this matter of absorbing Yazidi refugees.

== Relations with Israeli Jewish community of Kurdistani background ==
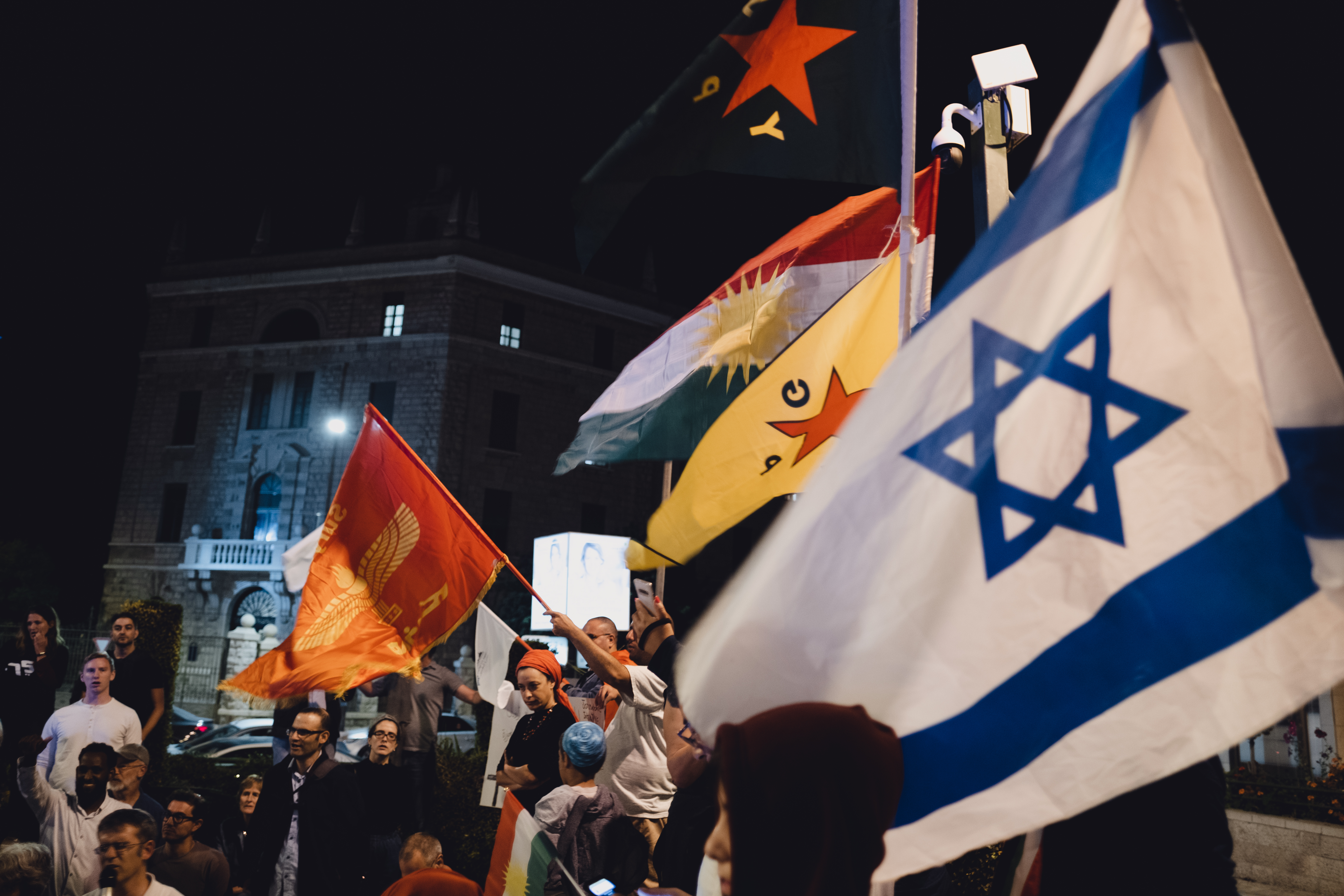
Views of the solidarity protest for Rojava organized by Kurdish Jews on October 12th 2019 in Jerusalem.

Israel is a home to some 200,000 Jews of Kurdistani origins, who are mostly descended from nearly 50 thousand Kurdish Jews evacuated from Iraq during Operation Ezra and Nehemiah in the early 1950s. Israeli Jews of Kurdistani background preserve ties with the ethnic Kurdish communities in the Middle East, including with the Kurdish individuals residing in Israel.

== Notable people ==
- Moshe Barazani, Iraqi-born Kurdish Jew and a member of Lehi ("Freedom Fighters of Israel," aka the "Stern Gang") underground movement in pre-state Mandate Palestine during the Jewish insurgency in Palestine
- Zvi Bar, Israeli military officer, police official, and politician
- Yosef Shiloach, Israeli actor
- Yitzhak Mordechai, Israeli former general and politician
- Itzik Kala, Israeli singer of Kurdish-Jewish descent who sings in Aramaic, Kurdish and Hebrew
- Mickey Levy, Israeli politician who currently serves as a member of the Knesset for Yesh Atid and Speaker of the Knesset
- Yona Sabar, Kurdistani Jewish scholar, linguist and researcher
- Itamar Ben-Gvir, Israeli lawyer and politician and a leader in the Israeli far-right Otzma Yehudit party
- Idan Amedi, Israeli singer-songwriter and actor
- Mossi Raz, Israeli politician. He is currently a member of the Knesset for Meretz
- Ran Raz, computer scientist who works in the area of computational complexity theory. He was a professor in the faculty of mathematics and computer science at the Weizmann Institute
- Yona Sabar, Kurdistani Jewish scholar, linguist and researcher. He is professor emeritus of Hebrew at the University of California, Los Angeles
- Uri Malmilian, Israeli former football player and current manager
- Haviv Shimoni, Israeli politician who served as a member of the Knesset for the Alignment between 1974 and 1977
- Itzik Shmuli, Israeli politician who served as the Minister of Labor, Welfare and Social Services and as a Member of the Knesset on behalf of the Israeli Labor Party; formerly chairman of National Union of Israeli Students, and one of the leaders of the 2011 Israeli social justice protests
- Zvi Yehezkeli, Israeli television journalist and documentarian. He is an Arab affairs correspondent and head of the Arab desk at Israeli News 13, the news division of Israel 13
- Miki Geva, Israeli stand-up comedian and actor
- Or Sasson, retired Israeli Olympic judoka. He won a bronze medal in the +100 kg category at the 2016 Summer Olympics and another one at the 2020 Summer Olympics. He is the second of two Israelis to win two Olympic medals
- Ilana Eliya, an Israeli singer of Kurdish descent.
- Amir Ohana – first openly gay right-wing (Likud) member of the Knesset & former minister of justice
- Ayelet Shaked – Knesset parliament right-wing member (2013–) & minister (2015–)
- Yisrael Yeshayahu Sharabi – former speaker of the Knesset
- Nir Shavit – computer scientist, winner of the Gödel Prize (2004)
- Adi Shamir – RSA encryption, differential cryptanalysis; Turing Award (2002)
- Saharon Shelah – logic; Wolf Prize in Mathematics (2001)
- Ehud Shapiro – Concurrent Prolog, DNA computing pioneer
- Moshe Y. Vardi – computer scientist, winner of the Gödel Prize (2000)
- Avi Wigderson – randomized algorithms; Nevanlinna Prize (1994)
- Pnina Rosenblum (female) – Knesset parliament member for Likud (2005–2006)
- Orly Levy-Abekasis (female) – Knesset parliament member for Likud (2009–) & minister (2020–2021)
- Yehezkel Zakai, Israeli former politician who served as a member of the Knesset for the Alignment between 1977 and 1984
- Matan Barashi, Israeli footballer who currently plays for Ironi Beit Shemesh
- Aviram Baruchyan, Israeli Footballer
- Evyatar Baruchyan, Israeli Footballer
- Ofir Kriaf, Israeli Footballer
- Avi Rikan, Israeli association football player
- Ohad Saidof, Israeli Footballer
- Aviel Zargari, Israeli Footballer
- Avi Cohen – defender, Liverpool and national team
- Tamir Cohen – midfielder (Bolton Wanderers and national team)
- Rami Gershon – centre back / left back Yaniv Katan – forward/winger (Maccabi Haifa, national team)
- Eli Ohana – won UEFA Cup Winners' Cup and Bravo Award (most outstanding young player in Europe); national team; manager
- Haim Revivo – attacking/side midfielder (Israel national team), Maccabi Haifa, Celta de Vigo, Fenerbahçe, Galatasaray
- Ronnie Rosenthal – left winger/striker (Israel national team), Maccabi Haifa, Liverpool, Tottenham, Watford
- Ben Sahar – striker/winger (Hapoel Tel Aviv, national team)

== See also ==
- Kurdish Jews in Israel
- Iraqi Kurdistan–Israel relations
