= Kurdish Jews in Israel =

Jewish ethnic subdivision

Total population
- Israel 300,000

Regions with significant populations
- Mainly Jerusalem, also Tel Aviv and many other places.

Languages
- Hebrew (Main language for all generations); Older generation: Kurdish (Kurmanji, Sorani and Feyli), Persian, Judeo-Aramaic

Religion
- Judaism

Kurdish Jews in Israel are immigrants and descendants of the immigrants of the Kurdish Jewish communities, who now reside within the state of Israel. They number about 300,000.

== History ==
Immigration of Kurdish Jews to the Land of Israel initiated during the late 16th century, with a community of rabbinic scholars arriving to Safed, Galilee, and a Kurdish Jewish quarter had been established there as a result. The thriving period of Safed however ended in 1660, with Druze power struggles in the region and an economic decline.

Many Kurdish Jews, especially the ones who hail from Iraq, went through a Sephardic Jewish blending during the 18th century.

Since the early 20th century, some Kurdish Jews had been active in the Zionist movement. One of the most famous members of Lehi (Freedom Fighters of Israel) was Moshe Barazani, whose family immigrated from Iraq and settled in Jerusalem in the late 1920s. In 1939, there were 4,369 in Jerusalem, growing to 30,000 in 1972.

The vast majority of Kurdish Jews were forced out by Iraqi authorities, being evacuated to Israel in the early 1950s, together with other Iraqi Jewish community. The vast majority of the Kurdish Jews of Iranian Kurdistan relocated mostly to Israel as well, in the 1950s.

The Times of Israel reported on September 30, 2013: "Today, there are almost 200,000 Kurdish Jews in Israel, about half of whom live in Jerusalem. There are also over 30 agricultural villages throughout the country that were founded by Kurdish Jews." Today, the large majority of the Jews of Kurdistan and their descendants live in Israel.

== Settlements ==
- Agur
- Avital
- Azaria
- Beit Yosef
- Givolim
- Ein HaEmek
- Ein Ya'akov
- Even Sapir
- Meitav
- Mlilot
- Nes Harim
- Neve Michael
- Patish
- Prazon
- Sdei Trumot
- Shibolim
- Talmei Bilu
- Revaha
- Yardena
- Zekharia

== Notable people ==
- Moshe Barazani
- Zvi Bar
- Ofer Levi
- Yosef Shiloach
- Yitzhak Mordechai
- Itzik Kala
- Ilana Eliya
- Mickey Levy
- Mossi Raz
- Ran Raz
- Sabat Islambouli
- Yona Sabar
- Uri Malmilian
- Haviv Shimoni
- Itzik Shmuli
- Zvi Yehezkeli
- Miki Geva
- Or Sasson
- Itamar Ben-Gvir
- Idan Amedi
- Yehezkel Zakai
- Yehezkel Mizrahi

== See also ==
- History of the Jews in Kurdistan
- Jewish ethnic divisions
- Aliyah
- Iranian Jews in Israel
- Iraqi Jews in Israel
- Turkish Jews in Israel
- Demographics of Israel
- Iraqi Kurdistan–Israel relations
- Palestinian Jews
