= Sandur, Iraq =

Former Jewish village in the Kurdistan Region, Iraq

Sandur سندۆرێ / סונדור
- Village
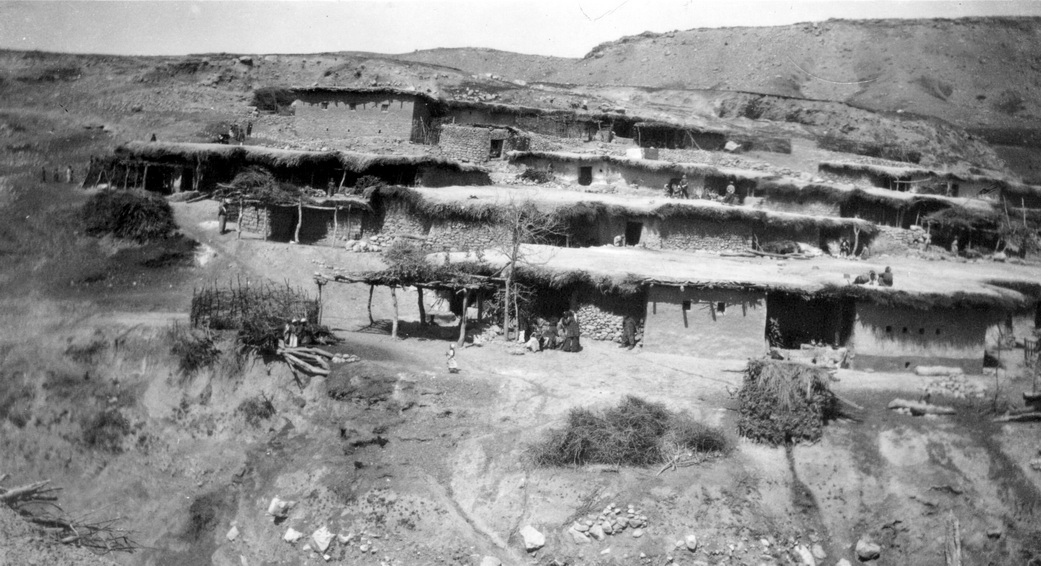
- Jewish homes in Sandur, Kurdistan, 1934.
- Interactive map of Sandur
- Location of Sandur in Iraq Sandur (Iraqi Kurdistan)
- Coordinates: 36°54′29″N 43°03′43″E
- Country: Iraq
- Region: Kurdistan Region
- Governorate: Duhok Governorate
- District: Duhok District

Population (1949)
  - Total: ~100 families
- Village was depopulated in the early 1950s due to Jewish emigration.
- Time zone: UTC+3 (AST)

Sandur, also spelled Sundur (Kurdish: سندۆرێ, romanized: Sindorê, Hebrew: סונדור), was a village in Iraqi Kurdistan, approximately 70 miles north of Mosul, near Duhok, on the way to Amediyah. First a historically Christian village, it later became an agricultural settlement inhabited by Kurdish Jews.

== History ==
In ancient times, the village had been inhabited by Christians and was later inhabited by Kurds and Jews after the Christians deserted it.

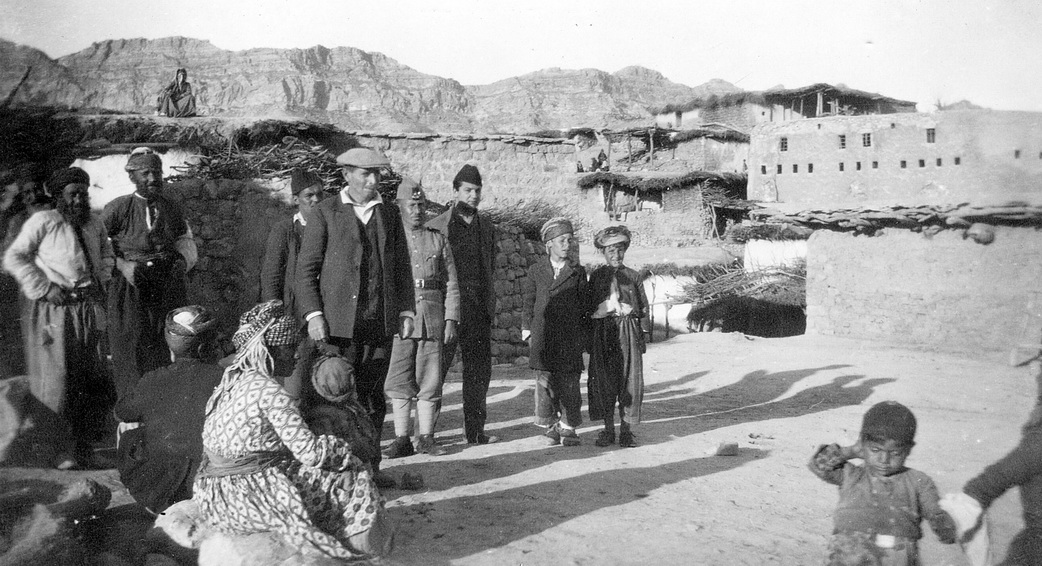
Visit to Sandur, 1934 – Meeting with Jews from Kurdistan

In 1849, Sandur was described as an extensive village, containing over 100 Jewish households, with a few inhabited by Kurds. By the first half of the 20th century, the village was entirely Jewish. All the village lands belonged to Jews, who worked in the vineyards and orchards growing pears, plums, pomegranates, and apples.

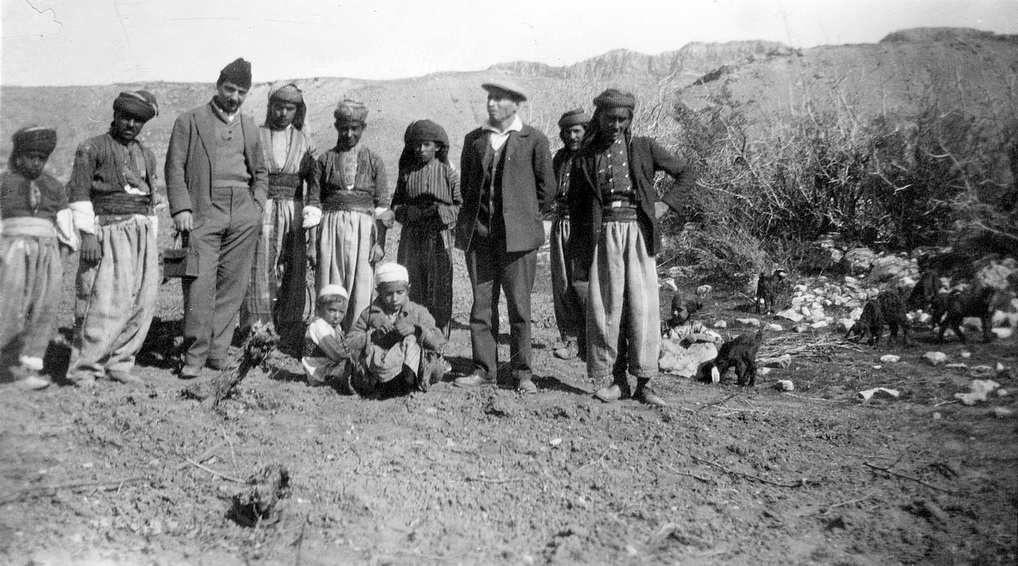
Benzion Israeli visiting Sandur, 1934

In 1933, there were about 60 Jewish families. In 1934, Benzion Israeli found 800 inhabitants and wrote that "Sandur is a state of its own... this is a Jewish village, an autonomous Jewish republic." In 1935, Walter Schwarz visited the village and gave a detailed report. He noted that it was inhabited only by Jews and that the fields and vineyards were well kept and yielded good crops.

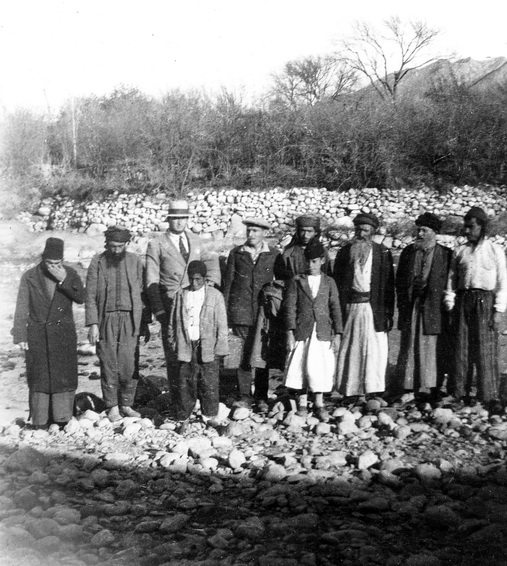
Jewish residents of Sandur, 1934

Mordechai Zaken, who investigated the history of Kurdistani Jews in previous centuries, explained why some reports described the village as entirely Jewish, while others mentioned Muslim Kurds living on the outskirts. Apparently, the Kurds working on the Sabbath disturbed the Jews, so the Jewish residents requested a judge from Mosul to order the Kurds to relocate outside the village. The Kurds agreed, but the Jews had to buy their houses, which they did.

After Iraq gained independence in 1932, the position of the Jews began to deteriorate.

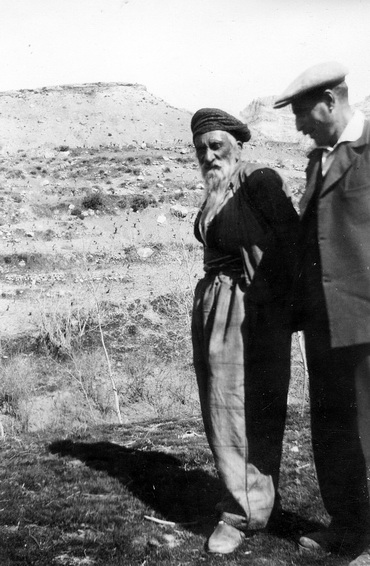
Benzion Israeli with a 102-year-old Jewish man in Sandur, 1934

In July 1941, it was reported in the Jewish Digest that the leader of the village expressed his wish for the 50 families living there to "sell their village and immigrate to Palestine".

During the Allied occupation of Iraq and in the backdrop of the Farhud, sporadic attacks on Jews continued throughout World War II. On December 17, 1942, anti-Jewish riots resulted in the murder of eight Jews in the village.

In 1943, Friedrich Simon Bodenheimer visited Sandur for an evening. He found the atmosphere disturbed by the "unfriendly attitude of the neighboring Kurdish villages." He claimed the Jews could not even sell their land, as the Kurds said, "We will soon get it for nothing!"

With the creation of the State of Israel in 1948, the situation worsened for Iraq's Jews, who were portrayed as Zionists. Their freedom of movement was restricted, and many lost their jobs. In 1949, there were still about 100 families living in Sandur.

On March 9, 1950, a law was passed that effectively depicted Jews as unprotected aliens. Soon after, rural Jews faced increasing economic hardship and felt increasingly vulnerable. In early June, it was reported that neighboring villages were threatening to murder the people of Sandur unless they left. The villagers were among the first wave of Jews who left the countryside for Baghdad to sign up for emigration.

Within the next few years, the remaining 500 Jews of Sandur emigrated to Israel. In Israel, the former inhabitants of Sandur founded the moshav of Sde Trumot.

== See also ==
- Kurdish Jews in Israel
- Israel–Kurdistan Region relations
