= Kurds in Palestine =

Ethnic group

كُرد فلسطين (Arabic)

Total population
- Approximately 2,000 to 3,000 people (2024, Kurdish descent, with connections to Palestinians and Kurdish Jews) Kurdish descent, with connections to Palestinians and Kurdish Jews (including those of ancestral descent)

Regions with significant populations
- Hebron, Gaza Strip, West Bank, Palestine

Languages
- Mainly Arabic, some speak Kurdish

Religion
- Islam, Christianity

Related ethnic groups
- Other Kurds, Palestinians, Kurdish Jews
- Some Kurdish population centers in Harat Al-Akrad, Hebron; significant presence in Gaza.

Kurds in Palestine (Kurdish: Kurdên Filistînê; Arabic: اكراد فلسطين: Akrad Filisteen) refers to Palestinians of Kurdish ancestry. These individuals trace their heritage to the Kurdish people, who have historically lived in the region, especially in areas such as Hebron and Gaza.

== History and population centers ==
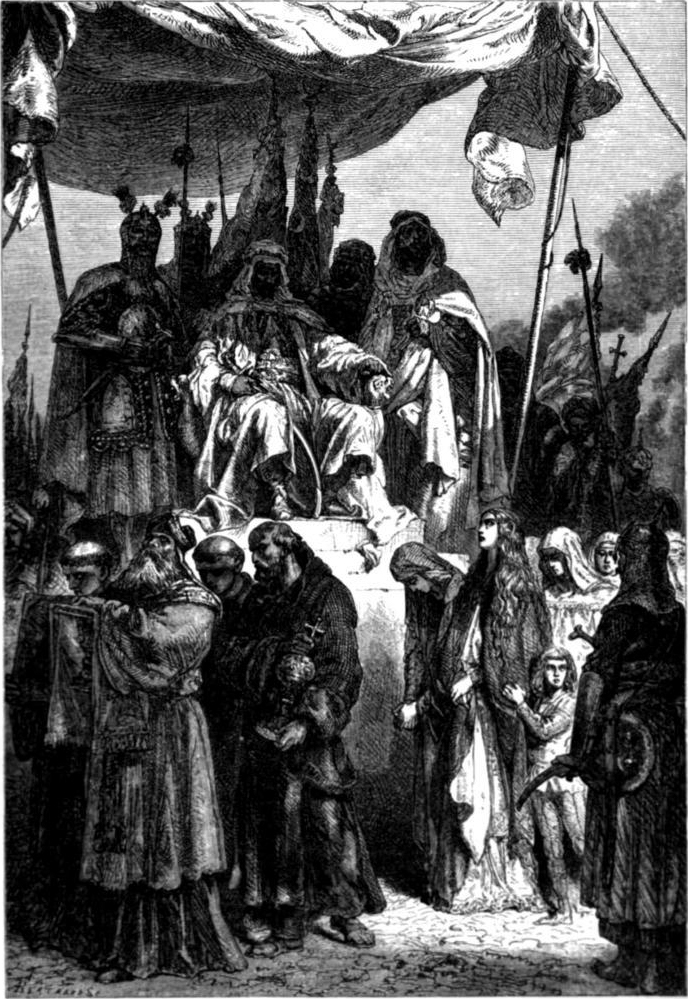
Saladin was a so-called Saracen of Kurdish origin, who conquered Palestine in the 12th century.

The origins of some Palestinian Kurds can be traced to the era of conquests of Kurdish Ayyubid dynasty during the Crusades. The Ayyubid rulers settled many Kurdish tribes in Palestine in order to secure the borders of their empire, particularly in the coastal areas to protect against an attack from the west. There are also many Kurdish clans who came to Palestine at post-Ayyubid periods, especially under the Ottomans. The Kurds are the largest ethnic minority in the West Bank.

According to academics Bernard Lewis and Amnon Cohen, there is no evidence that the Kurdish quarters in Palestinian cities maintained their ethnic character by the 16th century. In some Ottoman documents from the 16th century, the Kurds were regarded as a separate religious group from the general Sunni Muslim population, though were, according to Lewis and Cohen, "probably not regarded as distinct from the other inhabitants", despite "Kurdish quarters" still being the name of parts of the cities.

=== Gaza ===
Kurds began settling in the modern Gaza Strip during the Ayyubid's rule over Palestine. Some of the commanders of Saladin Ayyubi built castles in Gaza and to this day, many Palestinians of Kurdish descend live in Gaza. They have been by now become fully Arabized, and don't speak Kurdish anymore but they still feel connected to their identity.

=== Hebron ===
The Kurdish Muslim Saladin retook Hebron in 1187 – again with Jewish assistance according to one late tradition, in exchange for a letter of security allowing them to return to the city and build a synagogue there. The name of the city was changed back to Al-Khalil. A Kurdish quarter still existed in the town during the early period of Ottoman rule. Richard the Lionheart retook the city soon after. Richard of Cornwall, brought from England to settle the dangerous feuding between Templars and Hospitallers, whose rivalry imperiled the treaty guaranteeing regional stability stipulated with the Egyptian Sultan As-Salih Ayyub, managed to impose peace on the area. But soon after his departure, feuding broke out and in 1241 the Templars mounted a damaging raid on what was, by now, Muslim Hebron, in violation of agreements.

Some claim that as much as one third of inhabitants of Hebron(166,000) are of Kurdish origin, where they have had their own quarters, such as Harat al-Akrad (English: Quarter of Kurds).

== Demographics ==
According to an estimate, the non-arabized Kurdish community in Palestine is small, estimated to number around 2,000 to 3,000 people. They primarily reside in urban areas and have integrated into Palestinian society while maintaining their distinct cultural identity.

According to the 1922 census of Mandatory Palestine, 10 people speaking Kurdish lived in Palestine. Some Jewish Kurds had been active in the early Zionist movement. One of the most famous Kurdish members of the Lehi (Zionist terrorist group) was Moshe Barazani, whose family immigrated from Mandatory Iraq and settled in Jerusalem, Palestine in the late 1920s.

Kurds have been living in the city of Hebron since Saladin's conquest of Palestine and along with Jerusalem and Gaza, it is home to Palestinians of Kurdish descent. Nearly a third of the population of Hebron, is considered to be of Kurdish background. The Kurdish Quarter, known as Harat al-Akrad, still exists in the city today.

== Notable people ==
- Ghassan Kanafani
- Abu Obeida

== See also ==
- Ayyubids
- Kurds in Jordan
- Kurds in Israel
