= Sandur =

Sandur may refer to:

- Sandur (landform), an outwash plain formed by meltwater from glaciers
- Sandur, India, a town in Karnataka in southern India
  - Sandur (princely state), a former princely state of India
- Sandur, Faroe Islands, a village in the Faroe Islands
- Sandur, Iraq, a village in northern Iraq.
