= Asenath Barzani =

Kurdish Jewish rabbinical scholar and poet

- Born: 1590
- Died: 1670 (aged 79–80); Mosul, Mosul Eyalet, Ottoman Empire
- Occupations: Rabbinical scholar, rosh yeshiva, poet
- Years active: Around 1630-1670
- Known for: First recorded female Rabbinical scholar, early historical Kurdish woman

Asenath Barzani (Hebrew: אסנת ברזאני, 1590–1670), was a Kurdish Jewish female rabbinical scholar, rosh yeshiva, and poet who lived near Duhok, Kurdistan.

== Biography ==
=== Family background ===
Asenath was born in 1590 into the Barzani family, a well-known Jewish family in Northern Kurdistan. Her grandfather, Nathaniel HaLevi, was a rabbi and the leader of the Jewish community in Mosul, and considered to be a holy man in the local Jewish community and its environs. Due to the honor of his teachings, he was addressed as Adoni (Hebrew, lit. 'my lord'). His son and Asenath's father, Samuel Barzani, a rabbi and mystic, was troubled by the status of the Torah among the Jews of Kurdistan and by the lack of spiritual leaders and halakhic decisors. He established several yeshivas in Barzan, Akre, Amedi, and Mosul to cultivate wise students who could serve the public as rabbis, hazzans, and shochets (kosher slaughterers). The education of such students were supported by donations from Jewish philanthropists.

=== Life ===
As Samuel had no sons, he taught his daughter Torah and Talmud to prepare her as his successor. According to Asenath herself, she did not learn any other craft, trade, or vocation, as she spent all her time learning Torah. She described her upbringing as such:

I never left the entrance to my house or went outside; I was like a princess of Israel ... I grew up on the laps of scholars, anchored to my father of blessed memory. I was never taught any work but sacred study.

Barzani married her cousin Ya'aqov Mizraḥi, who promised her father that she would do no domestic work and could spend her time as a Torah scholar.

“And he [my father] made my husband swear that he would not make me perform work, and he did as he had commanded him. From the beginning, the Rabbi [Mizrahi] was busy with his studies and had no time to teach the pupils; but I taught them in his stead, I was a helpmate for him... [Begging for support for] the sake of Father... and the Rabbi... so that their Torah and names should not be brought to naught in these communities; for I remain the teacher of Torah...”

The German Jewish ethnologist Erich Brauer, who included Barzani's letter (without mentioning her name) in his study of the Jews of Iraq in the early 1940s, was not convinced she could have composed such writing on her own.

After Barzani's father's death, her husband became head of the yeshivah in Mosul. He was so involved in his studies that she taught the yeshivah students and provided them with rabbinic training. Following Ya'aqov's death, the leadership of the yeshivah passed to her, and eventually, she became known as the chief teacher of the Torah. As neither her father nor her husband had been successful fundraisers, the yeshivah was always in financial difficulties, and Barzani wrote letters requesting funds in which she described her and her children's difficult situation. Her home and belongings were confiscated, but she felt that, as a woman, it would be inappropriate for her to travel in search of financial support.

In spite of the financial problems, Barzani's leadership of the yeshivah was successful. It continued to produce serious scholars, including her son, whom she sent to Baghdad, where he continued the dynasty of rabbinic scholars. Her few extant writings demonstrate a complete mastery of the Hebrew language, Torah, Talmud, Midrash, as well as Kabbalah, and her letters display not only learnedness but also a skill for lyrical prose. After her death, many Jews made pilgrimages to her grave in Amedi in the Kurdistan Region in Upper Mesopotamia, where her father is also buried.

== Title and status ==
The title of Tanna'it, and her role as head of a yeshiva, is not equivalent to being a rabbi, and hence she is regarded as a rare example of an Orthodox female rabbinical teacher, rather than a rabbi per se, or a rabbinic authority figure such as a posek or dayan. At the time during which Barzani lived, the concept of rabbinic ordination (semikha) was in flux and a unified agreement of the requirements and rituals for semikha across the Jewish world did not exist.

== Poetry ==
In addition to her religious scholarship, Barzani was also known as a poet. She is said to have authored a piyyut (liturgical poem) called Ga’agua l’Zion ("Longing for Zion", in Hebrew).

== Legends ==
There are many stories and legends about Barzani and miracles she performed, including the one described in "A Flock of Angels".

In local folklore, her gender plays a central role (though in her actual life, she seems to have experienced few obstacles). Many of the stories which allude to her supernatural powers were found in segulot (protective amulets, charms, or rituals). These include her ability to limit her childbearing to two children so that she could devote herself to her studies, and the ability to ward off an intruder in order to prevent him from raping her by loudly calling out holy names.

=== A Flock of Angels ===
According to the legend, her father often appeared in Barzani's dreams, revealing dangers to her and telling her how to avert them. On one such occasion, she went to Amêdî where she convinced the local Jews to celebrate Rosh Hodesh (the new moon festival) outdoors, as had been their custom before they were threatened by hostile gentiles.

As they proceeded with the celebration, there were shouts and they saw flames shoot up into the sky. The synagogue had been set on fire, with all the sacred books and scrolls in it. After Barzani whispered a secret name she had learned from her father, the people saw a flock of angels descending to the roof of the synagogue. The angels beat the flames with their wings, until every last spark had been put out. Then they rose up into the heavens like a flock of white doves and were gone. And when the smoke cleared, everybody saw that not only none of the Jews had been hurt since the congregation had been outdoors, but that another miracle had taken place: the synagogue had not burned, nor were any of the Torah scrolls touched by the flames. After that miracle, the Jews of Amêdî were not harassed by the gentiles for a long time. Gratefully, they renamed the synagogue after her, and the legend ends with the words "and it is still standing today".

== See also ==
- Timeline of women rabbis
