= Rewaya =

Rewaya may refer to:

- Revaya, a settlement in Israel
- Riwaya, a chain of transmission of Quranic qiraʼat
