= Alliance of the periphery =

Alliance of non-Arab and non-Muslim actors in the Middle East

Map showing the alliance of the periphery Israel Turkey, Iran, Ethiopia Islamic Arab states

The alliance of the periphery (Note: Hebrew: ברית הפריפריה‌; Arabic: تحالف المحيط; Turkish: Çevre İttifakı; Persian: اتحاد پیرامون; Kurdish: ‌Yekîtiya Çarkînar) was a foreign-policy strategy developed by Israeli prime minister David Ben-Gurion. In 1999, Meir Amit, the head of Mossad, described it as an "alliance with all the actors in the Middle East who are not Muslim Arabs".

== History ==
The term "periphery" was used due to the fact that non-Arabs and non-Muslims largely geographically encircled the Arab Muslim population in the Middle East. The original 1958 alliance included Israel, Turkey, the Imperial State of Iran, and the Ethiopian Empire. However, the policy was also applied regarding the Druze, Kurds, Baloch, Berbers, Middle Eastern Christians, and the South Sudanese. According to Baruch Uziel, the alliance would overwhelm the Arabs and end their imperialism, bringing peace to non-Arab and non-Muslim communities, and ultimately to the whole region. Uziel acknowledged the challenges to such an alliance, like the "political conflicts" between some of these non-Arab communities (like between Turks and Kurds) and the shared Islamic religion that some of these people had with Arabs, but defended it claiming that "no new and bold idea has ever forged its way in a direct line and without curves."

While Israeli foreign policy generally pursued Israeli interests, Yossi Alpher claimed that "the sole exceptions were some of the links with minorities, where Israel's support reflected a genuine degree of both sympathy for and empathy with those suffering at Arab hands." Israel continued to pursue the alliance after its military victories over the neighboring Arab nations.

In 1949, Turkey became the first Muslim-majority state to formally recognize Israel. In 1958, Israeli prime minister David Ben-Gurion and Turkish prime minister Adnan Menderes held a secret meeting, in which they discussed the alliance, and exchanged intelligence and military support. Iran was also involved, but at a lesser extent. Turkey and Israel were mainly worried about the newly established Ba’athist regimes in Iraq and Syria. Iran, Turkey, and Israel established a pact known as "the Trident" in 1958. In 1967, Turkey called for Israel's withdrawal from the occupied territories, but refused to join the Arabs in condemning Israel as an "aggressor state." At a meeting of the Organization of the Islamic Conference in Rabat, Turkey opposed a resolution calling for Muslim states to sever diplomatic relations with Israel. The Yom Kippur War of 1973 and the OPEC oil embargo however caused a cooling of the alliance.

The 1979 Iranian revolution was a major setback for the policy. The new government of Iran severed relations with Israel and withdrew recognition. Iranian leaders such as Ruhollah Khomeini, Ali Khamenei and Mahmoud Ahmadinejad repeatedly called Israel an "illegal entity" and even called for its destruction. Israel made several attempts at reestablishing the alliance with the Islamic Republic of Iran, and Israel funded and armed Iran during the Iran-Iraq war, and assisted Iran in the sale of its oil. Turkey facilitated relations between Israel and Iran. Iranian Jews living in Israel would visit Turkey, mail their Israeli passports back to Israel, and enter Iran using their Iranian passports. Iranian government officials flew to Israel from Turkey, and did not stamp their passports.

As Turkey and Iran were the pillars of the alliance, the Kurds did not play a big role. However, Israel actively supported the Kurdish separatist movement in Iraq. Neither Turkey nor Iran wanted a Kurdish state on their borders, although Israel supported the Kurds in Iraq in the 1960s with approval from Iran. Ben-Gurion urged Mossad to support the KDP "without stepping on Iranian and Turkish toes." Since the late 1950s, Mossad and SAVAK had cooperated to support Kurdish groups in Iraq. Israel recognized the relevance of supporting Kurdish separatism in Iraq only, purposely disregarding the Kurdish separatist movements in Turkey and Iran. Israeli support for Iraqi Kurds began after Abdulkarim Qasim came to power in 1958 in response to Qasim's support for a Palestinian state. Eliezer Tsafrir, senior Mossad veteran, claimed that Israel supported the KDP under Mustafa Barzani against Iraq, although never supported the Kurds against Turkey or Pahlavi Iran.

== See also ==
- Foreign relations of Israel
  - Armenia–Israel relations
  - Azerbaijan–Israel relations
  - Israel–Turkey relations
    - Neo-Ottomanism
    - Turkish support for Hamas
    - Turkish–Islamic nationalism
  - Iran–Israel relations
  - Israel–South Sudan relations
  - Ethiopia–Israel relations
  - Israel–Somaliland relations
  - Israel–Kurdistan Region relations
  - Israel–PKK relations
- Iran–Israel proxy conflict
  - Arab–Israeli alliance
- Indo-Abrahamic Alliance
- Arab-Islamic nationalism
- Prometheism, a 20th-century Polish political project to weaken the Russian Empire
