= Sdei Trumot =

Moshav in northern Israel

Sdei Trumot: שדי תרומות (Hebrew)
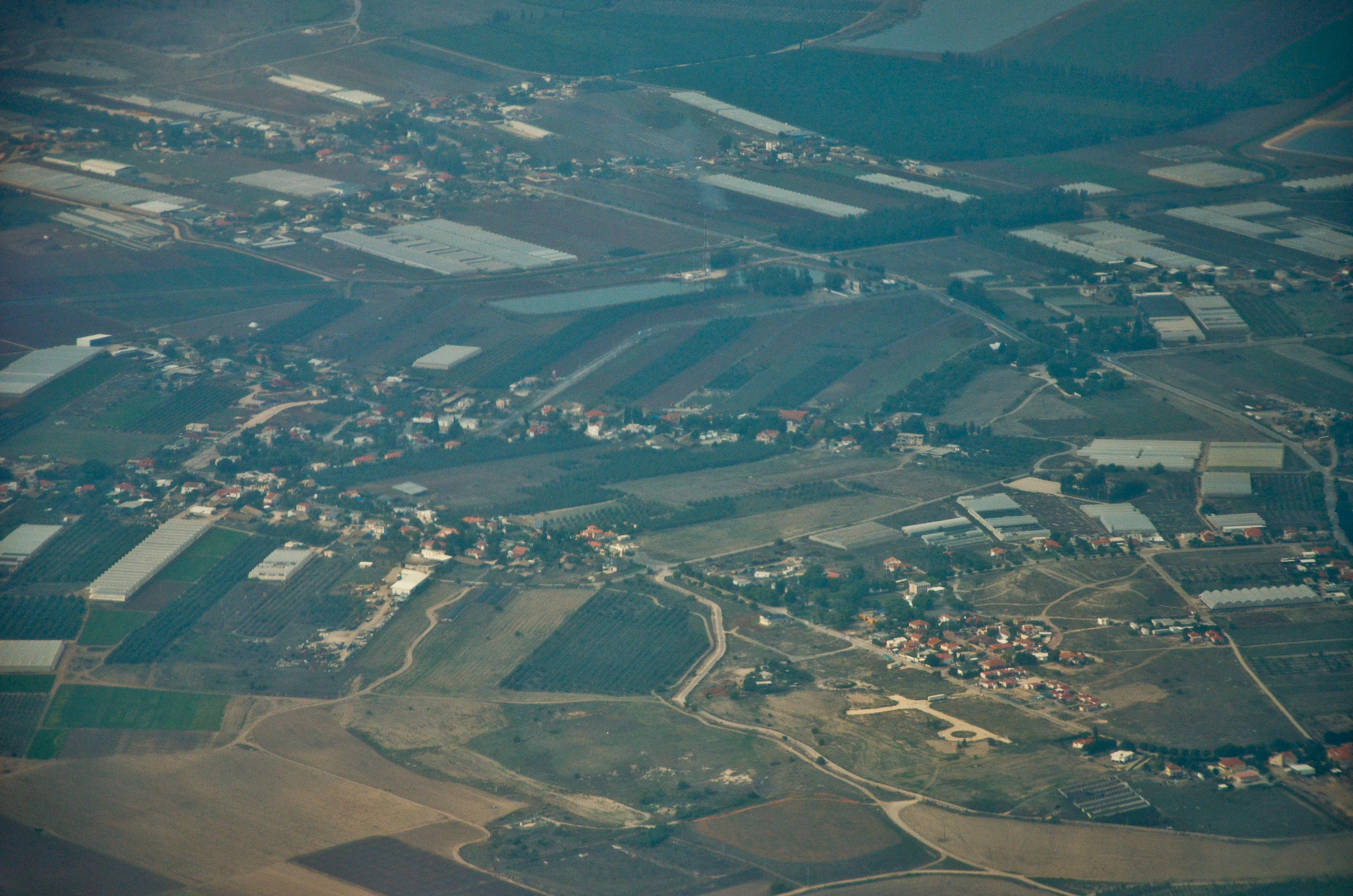

- Location within Jezreel Valley region of Israel Location within Israel
- Coordinates: 32°26′25″N 35°29′10″E
- Country: Israel
- District: Northern
- Subdistrict: Jezreel
- Council: Valley of Springs
- Affiliation: Hapoel HaMizrachi
- Founded: 1951
- Founder: Jewish immigrants from Sandur, Iraq
- Population (2024): 638

Sdei Trumot (Hebrew: שדי תרומות) is a moshav in northern Israel. Located in the Beit She'an Valley about 7 km (4 mi) south of Beit She'an, it falls under the jurisdiction of Valley of Springs Regional Council. In 2024 it had a population of 638.

The moshav is one of four moshavim in the "Bikurah" bloc. The others are Revaya, Rehov, and Tel Teomim, which are located nearby.

== History ==
The village founded in 1951 by Kurdish Jews immigrants from the village of Sandur in Iraq. The name "Sdei Trumot" is based on the lamentation of David for Saul and Jonathan who were killed in a war against the Philistines on nearby Mount Gilboa. The words "Sdei trumot," meaning "fields of offerings," appear in Samuel II, chapter 1, verse 21.

Sdei Trumot was established on the lands of the depopulated Palestinian village of Al-Samiriyya.

On 19 June 2003, a suicide attack in the moshav killed the storekeeper, Avner Mordechai.

== Economy ==
The primary source of income in the early days was agriculture and cattle raising. Today the village operates greenhouses and uses advanced technology.
