= Tel Te'omim =

Community settlement in northern Israel

Tel Te'omim: תֵּל תְּאוֹמִים (Hebrew)
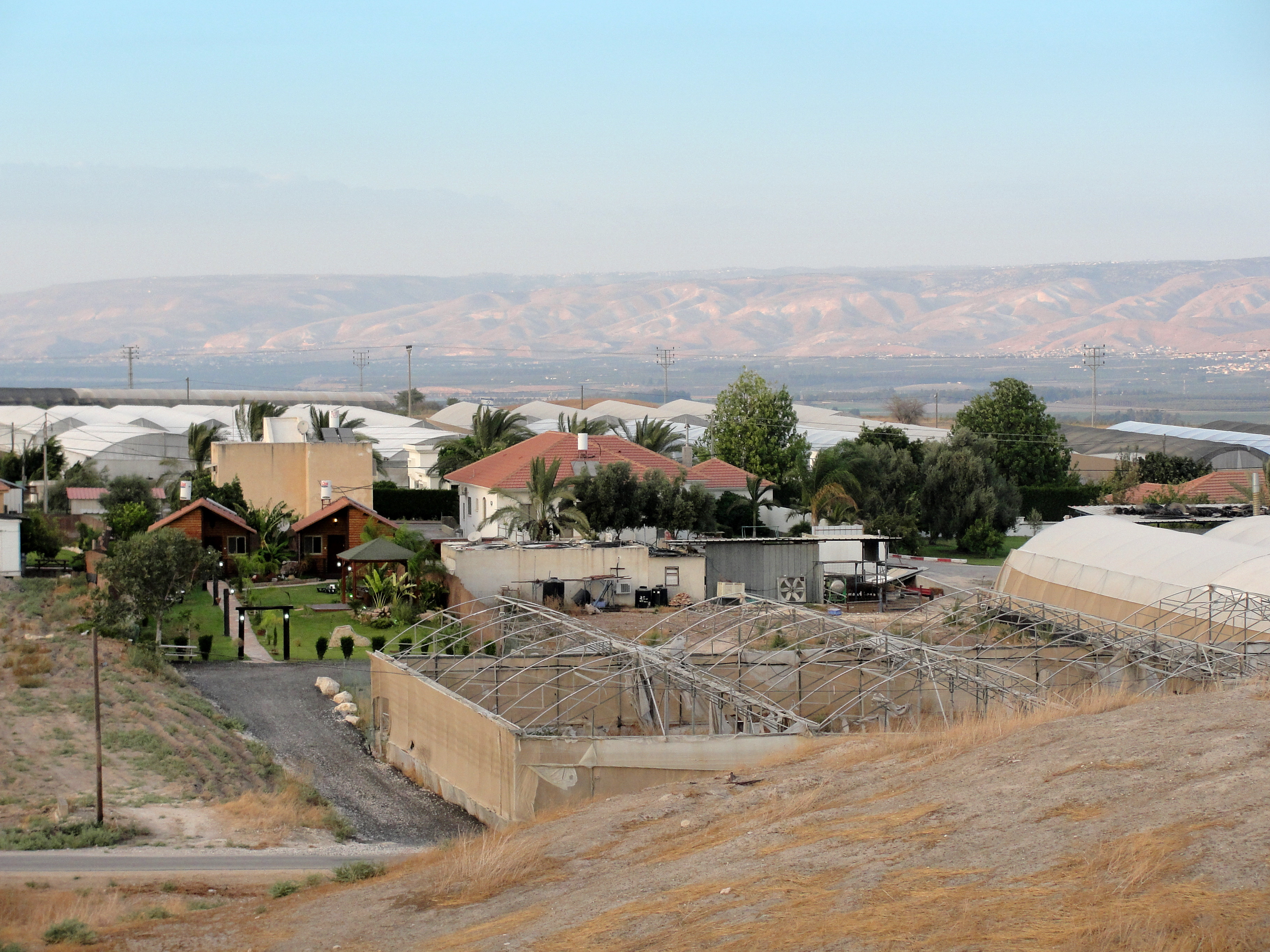

- Location within Jezreel Valley region of Israel
- Coordinates: 32°26′33″N 35°29′43.79″E
- Country: Israel
- District: Northern
- Subdistrict: Jezreel
- Council: Valley of Springs
- Affiliation: Hapoel HaMizrachi
- Founded: 1982
- Founder: Moshavniks
- Population (2024): 658

Tel Te'omim (Hebrew: תֵּל תְּאוֹמִים) is a community settlement in the Beit She'an valley in northern Israel. Located about 6 km south of Beit She'an, just east of Highway 90, it falls under the jurisdiction of Valley of Springs Regional Council. In 2024 it had a population of 658.

== History ==
The village was founded in 1982 as an expansion of the three other moshavim in its vicinity: Revaya, Rehov, and Sdei Trumot. Together these four settlements are combined in the "Bikurah" bloc. The population of Tel Te'omim is mostly composed of people who originally lived in the original three moshavim.

The name "Tel Te'omim", which means "twin hills" or the "hill of twins", is associated with a pair of nearby hills of archaeological interest.

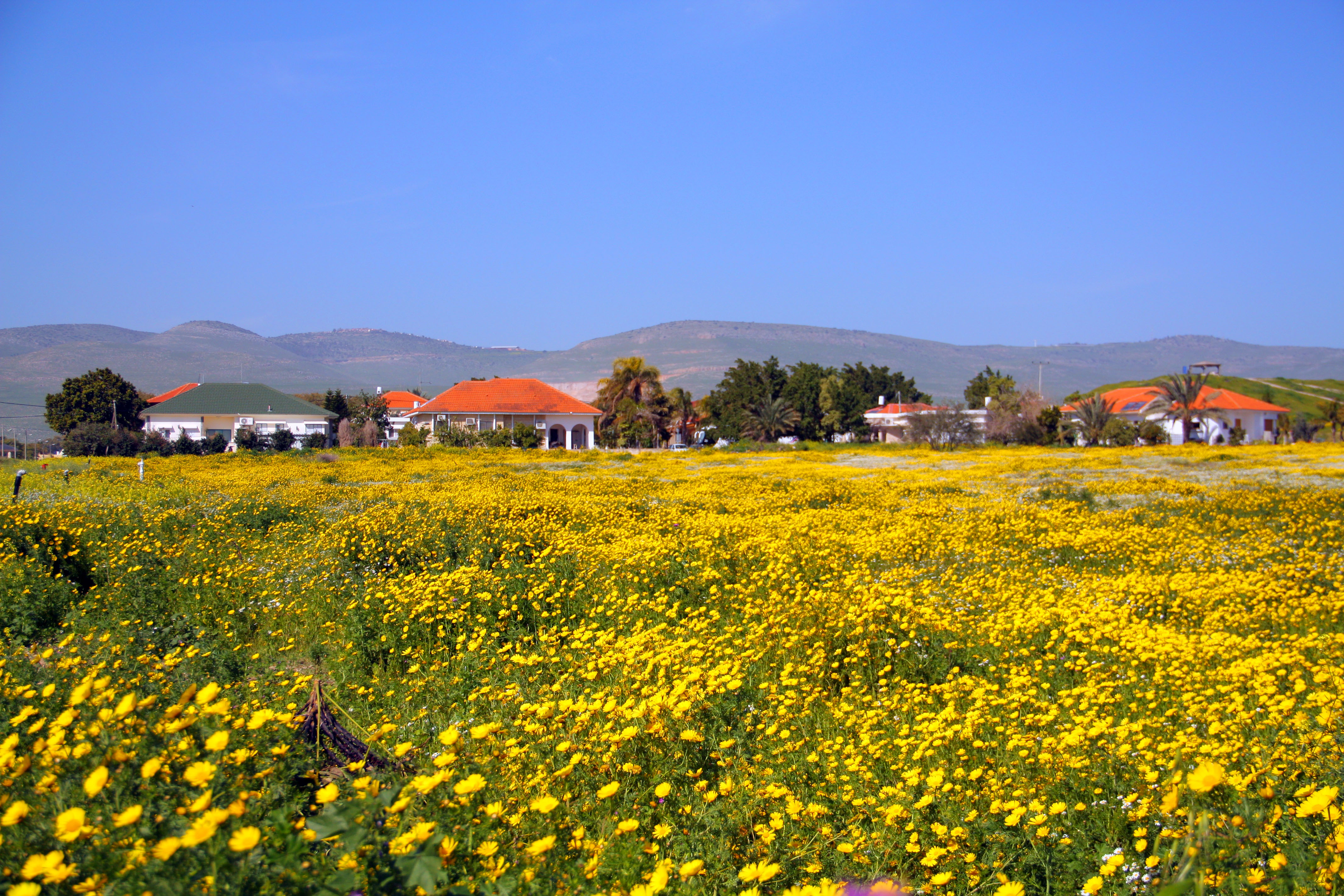
Tel Te'omim with Mount Gilboa

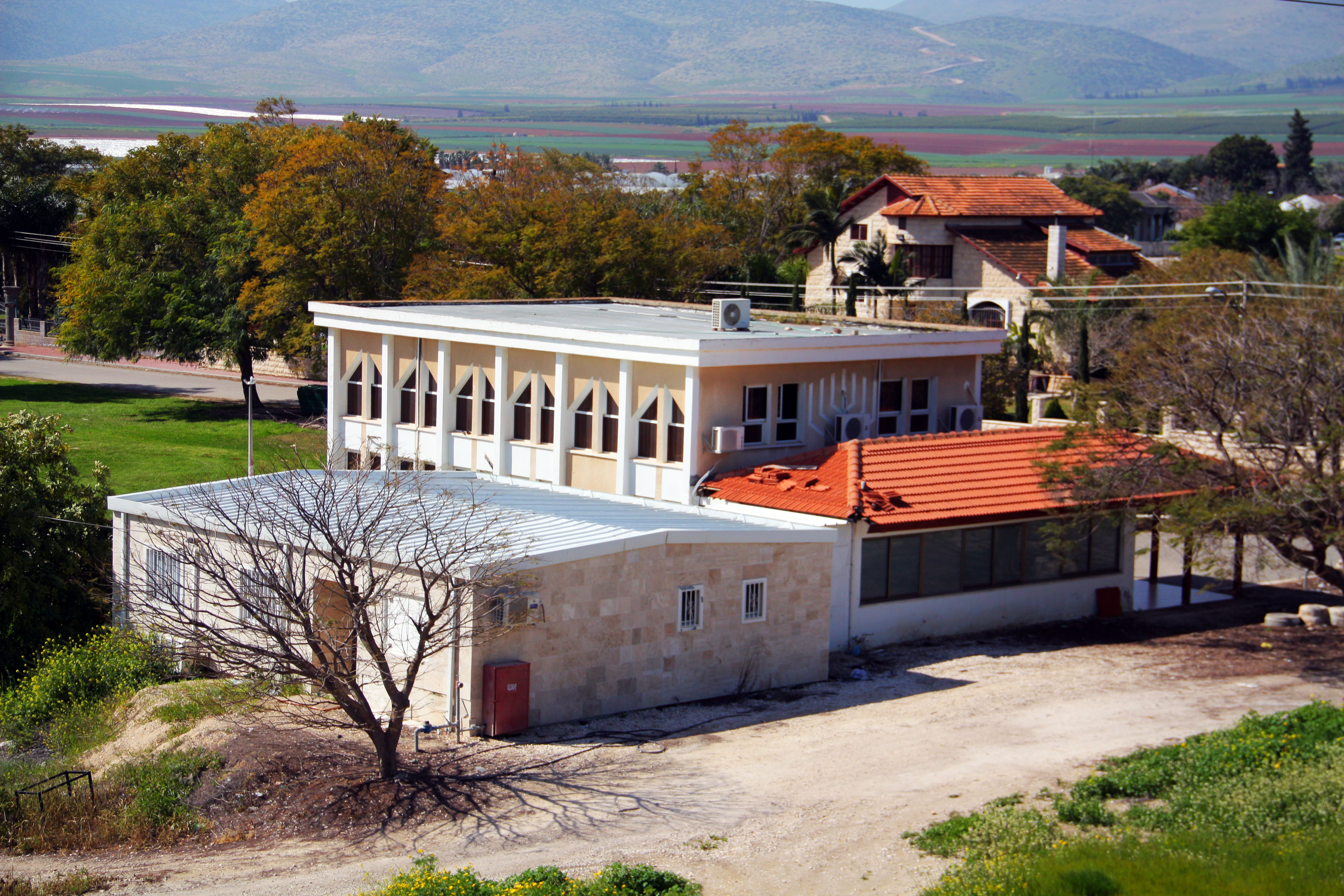
Synagogue
