= Israel–South Sudan relations =

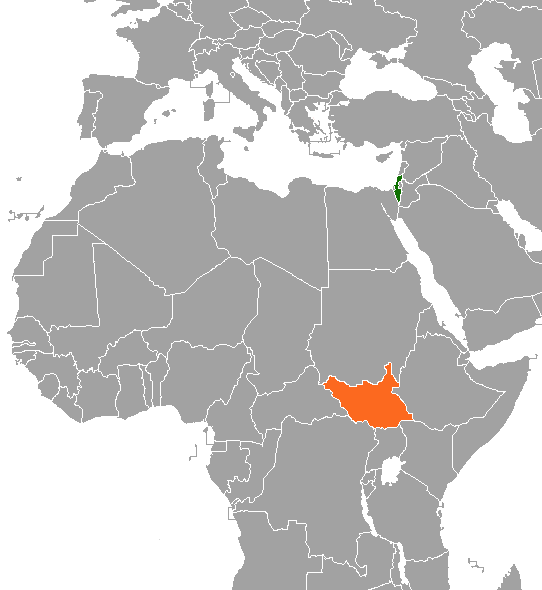

- Israel: South Sudan

Israel recognised South Sudan on 10 July 2011, a day after South Sudan became an independent state. On 15 July, South Sudan announced that it intended to have full diplomatic relations with Israel. On 28 July, Israel announced that it had established full diplomatic ties with South Sudan. At the moment ties are primarily economic, though the political facet is an integral feature.

== History ==
Relations between the two entities began in the late 1960s, when leaders of various southern rebel groups, waging an insurrection against the northern government and impressed by Israel's victory in the 1967 Six-Day War, reached out to Israel. Visiting Israel was a punishable offense in Sudan; southerners thus maintained ties with Israel at great personal risk. Israeli envoys also met with regional South Sudanese leaders and initiated an aid programme in the spheres of agriculture and infrastructure development.

The South Sudanese diaspora in Israel advocated for ties to be formalised, and the Israeli government found ways to engage with the regional government of South Sudan, mainly through Mashav, the international cooperation division of the Israeli Foreign Ministry. The American Jewish Committee's Africa Institute visited South Sudan in 2008 to meet with government officials and learn of ways in which the diaspora in Israel might be involved in state-building efforts in preparation for South Sudan's independence. The Africa Institute also introduced senior members of the South Sudanese leadership to officials in the Israeli Prime Minister's Office and Ministry of Foreign Affairs.

Lignet suggested that South Sudan seeks to foster security cooperation and economic ties with Israel. South Sudan also has access to oil and other natural resources that may be beneficial to Israel and could offer support in negotiations with Egypt on the allocation of Nile River water.

In August 2025, Israel announced it would send urgent humanitarian aid to South Sudan including medical equipment, water purification supplies, and food to address the cholera outbreak there. The announcement came amid reports that Israel was in talks with the Government of South Sudan about resettling people from the Gaza Strip in South Sudan, a claim denied by the South Sudanese government.

== Economic ties ==
Israel has offered economic help to South Sudan. IsraAid helped South Sudan set up its Ministry of Social Development. Israel and South Sudan engaged in their first official agreement in July 2012, when Israel Military Industries signed a pact to cooperate on water infrastructure and technology development. The agreement outlined plans for cooperation between Israel and South Sudan on desalination, irrigation, water transport, and purification. Israel's Energy and Water Minister Uzi Landau told his South Sudanese counterpart Water and Irrigation Minister Akec Paul Mayom: "We see this as a privilege to be the first [sector in Israel] to sign an agreement with the new state."

Israeli businessman Meir Greiver founded the South Sudan Development Company Ltd. with the intent of setting up business opportunities for Israelis in South Sudan. He said, "the sky is the limit to the money-making potential of the world's youngest country." He also said that "Very simply put, the country is open and ready to be built from the ground up. The [ruling] North never invested in the South, didn't develop it and now there's a great deal to do there." He cited such reasons as "years of official neglect of South Sudan's infrastructure by the ruling North has left the new country with a desperate need for infrastructure, roads, airport, hospitals, electrical infrastructure and more. The United States, Europe, and the World Bank are planning on funneling very large amounts of money to the development of South Sudan, and the country has a large amount of oil and natural resources of its own that are waiting to be utilised and which will help the country move forward. There will be many different sources of money, from the World Bank, the European Union, the United States, and elsewhere flowing into South Sudan and the potential to make money in many different fields is enormous. They have gold, and uranium; some also say there is some aluminum. It is absolutely a place where things can be done. Also, because the salaries are so very low, I think that many Israeli businessmen who send their manufacturing and textile work to China could do it there instead, that's one example." He called on Israeli companies to hasten the move to South Sudan "before the Chinese, Europeans and others get in and take these opportunities."

In 2012, Israel revealed plans for a model agricultural village in South Sudan where local farmers will be trained in agricultural technologies developed in Israel such as drip irrigation. The farm, funded by the Israeli government, will be the first of several joint agricultural projects in South Sudan.

In January 2013, South Sudan announced that it had signed an agreement with several Israeli oil companies.

== Refugees in Israel ==
There are at least 2,800 refugees from South Sudan who reside in Israel. The majority of them arrived in Israel through the Israeli-Egypt border and most live in Tel Aviv, Arad, Eilat and Bnei Brak. Up to 7,000 South Sudanese are also believed to be living in Israel. Despite controversy in Israel over their presence, the Supreme Court of Israel's decision from 13 January 2011, the employers of refugees and asylum seekers will not be fined; thus, de facto, they can legally work in Israel.

After the Israeli recognition of South Sudan on 10 July 2011, Interior Minister Eli Yishai called on Israel to immediately begin negotiations with South Sudan in order to return the thousands of Sudanese refugees and migrant workers who had crossed into Israel illegally in the past several years. In February 2012, the Interior Ministry announced that the South Sudanese nationals must be repatriated by March, arguing they no longer needed protection since South Sudan had gained independence. They would be given US$1,300 and a plane ticket if they voluntarily resettle, but those who refuse to do so will be forcibly deported.

Following the voluntary deportations of some South Sudanese, at least two students from the Interdisciplinary Center Herzliya (IDC) and the University of Tel Aviv sought to return in order to finish their studies. They received visas from the embassy in Ethiopia to return to Israel, but were later deported at Ben Gurion International Airport by the Population, Immigration and Border Authority, whose spokeswoman, Sabine Haddad, said that as they had been "infiltrator[s]" they could be ineligible to return to the country and that as neither PIBA nor the Interior Ministry issued the visa the embassy's actions were erroneous and the Foreign Ministry was responsible. In turn the foreign ministry said that it was subcontracted to do the consular issues for the interior ministry outside the country and thus had the legal right to approve applications while using the interior ministry's computer systems. The move followed an IDC campaign to revoke the deportations.

== Diplomatic relations ==
On 9 July 2011, South Sudan officially gained its independence from Sudan. Israel recognised its independence the following day, during a weekly cabinet meeting. Israeli Prime Minister Benjamin Netanyahu told his cabinet that "I announce here that Israel recognises South Sudan. We wish it success. It is a peace-seeking country and we would be happy to cooperate with it in order to ensure its development and prosperity."

On 15 July, South Sudan reciprocated, citing a desire for international peace. This is considered a significant boon to Israel, as it had never had official diplomatic relations with Sudan, until October 23, 2020. Haim Koren was the first Israeli ambassador to South Sudan. The current Israeli ambassador to South Sudan is Hanan Goder-Goldberger though he is a non-resident ambassador based at the Ministry of Foreign Affairs in Jerusalem.

== Bilateral visits ==
On 28 July, after an Israeli delegation visited the South Sudanese capital of Juba and held talks with senior government officials, the Israeli Foreign Ministry announced that Israel has established full diplomatic relations with South Sudan. "The practical aspects of the relations such as accrediting ambassadors will soon be discussed through the diplomatic channels."

In August 2011, South Sudan President Salva Kiir told a visiting Israeli delegation that included MK Danny Danon, that South Sudan planned to establish its embassy in Jerusalem. On 20 December 2011, Kiir visited Israel and expressed his gratitude for its support during the First Sudanese Civil War. At a meeting with Israeli President Shimon Peres, he reiterated his intention of opening an embassy in Jerusalem. He also added that he was "very moved" to be in Israel and acknowledged Israel's historic support: "Without you, we would not have arisen. You struggled alongside us in order to allow the establishment of South Sudan and we are interested in learning from your experience." He was followed by a later visit from Minister of Agriculture and Forestry Betty Achan Ogwaro.

== See also ==
- Foreign relations of Israel
- Foreign relations of South Sudan
- Illegal immigration from Africa to Israel
