= Israel–Kurdistan Region relations =

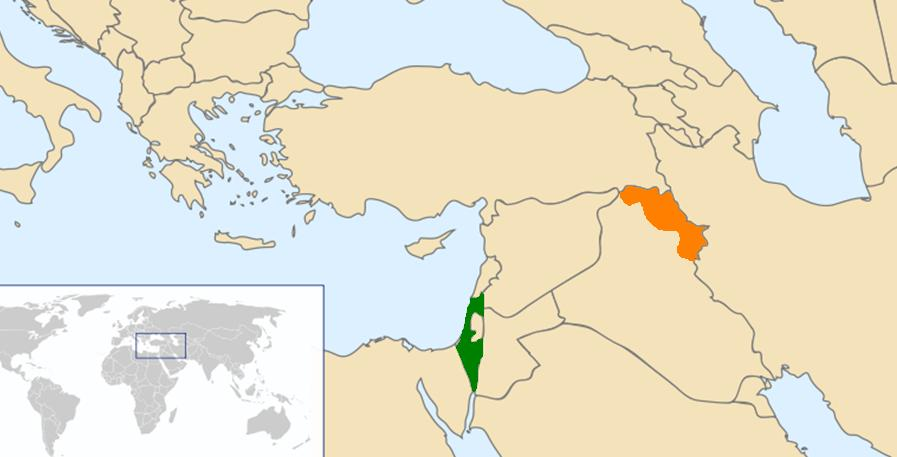
- Israel: Kurdistan Region

Israel and the Kurdistan Region of Iraq have maintained a cordial relationship with each other, in spite of the lack of formal diplomatic ties. Their ties are rooted in Israel's historically strong support for the Kurds and their long-running desire for self-determination and national independence in Kurdistan. In 1992, shortly after Iraq lost the Gulf War, the Kurdistan Region was recognized as an autonomous entity and began governing a portion of Iraqi Kurdistan, marking a significant development in the Iraqi–Kurdish conflict. In August 2026, Masrour Barzani stated that KRG has no relations with Israel.In light of Israel's conflict with the Arab countries, the Kurdistan Region has declared that there is no cause for animosity between Kurds and Israelis. In 2017, the Israeli government openly voiced support for the establishment of an independent Kurdish state. Relations between the two sides have been met with antisemitism and anti-Kurdish sentiment from the Arab League, Iran, and Turkey.

== History ==
The earliest attested interaction between what would later become Israel and Iraqi Kurdistan was in 1931, when the future director of Israel's Mossad, Reuven Shiloah, visited Kurdistan in disguise as a Hebrew teacher and journalist. During his stay, he forged contacts and developed the foundation for an Israeli relationship with the non-Arab communities in the region.

=== Aliyah by Jews through Kurdistan (1948–1949) ===
As relations between Jews and Arabs deteriorated further due to large gains made by Jewish paramilitary groups in the 1948 Palestine war, Jews residing in Arab countries experienced heightened persecution, which culminated in their mass exodus. The majority of Iraq's Jewish population fled to Israel from the late-1940s onwards, and did so via Kurdistan with support from neighbouring Iran and the newly independent Israeli state. The Kurdish-Jewish community in Israel would later form the basis of the Israeli policy on the Kurds as they were the primary source of incoming information for Israel on the developing situation of Kurdistan.

=== Israeli–Kurdish relations (1958–1979) ===
Due to its existence as one of the few non-Arab states in the Middle East alongside Iran and Turkey, Israel formulated the "periphery doctrine", which expressed that it needed to focus on the development of strategic relations with non-Arabs in the region. Among the groups in the policy were the Kurds, who not only were the largest non-Arab population in the region, but also resided over a strategic territory in the Arab-majority state of Iraq, which had taken part in the 1948 Arab–Israeli War. In 1959, the Kurdish leader Mustafa Barzani sent Kamuran Alî Bedirxan to Geneva, Switzerland, where he met with the erstwhile Israeli foreign minister Golda Meir who promised unconditional Israeli support for an independent Kurdistan. Israel began aiding the Kurdish Peshmerga against the Iraqi state during the First Iraqi–Kurdish War, which lasted from 1961 to 1970 and resulted in the signing of the Iraqi–Kurdish Autonomy Agreement. Despite the signing of the treaty between Iraq and the Kurds, the Iraqi–Kurdish conflict escalated shortly afterwards due to the resumption of Arabization campaigns against the Kurds.

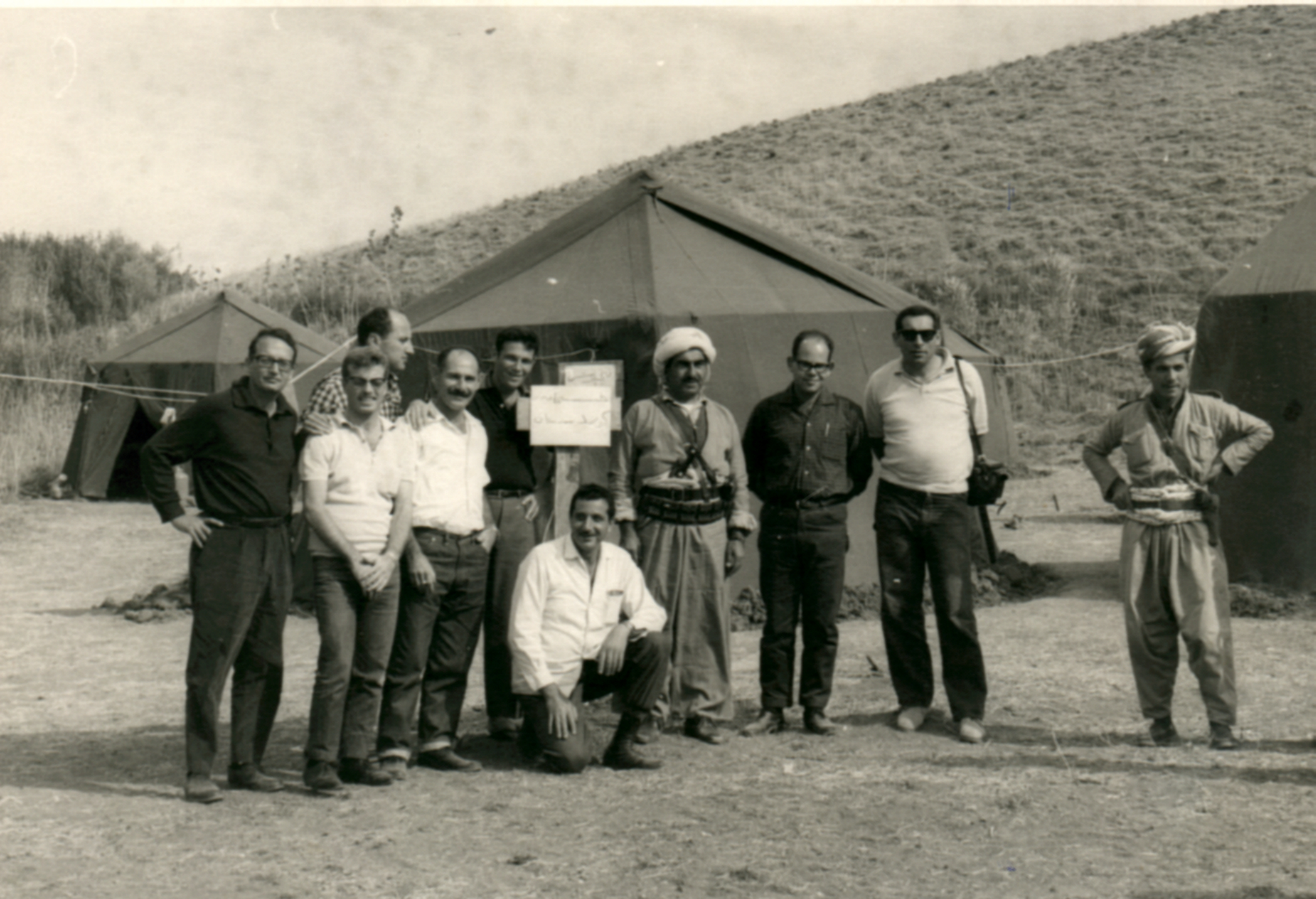
Field hospital of the Israel Defense Forces in Iraqi Kurdistan (1963–1973)

While initially hesitant about an Israeli presence in Kurdistan, Iran's SAVAK intelligence agency was successfully convinced by Israel to assist the Kurds in 1961, and Israel was allowed to use Iranian territory as a conduit for its activities, which included the transportation of weapons and food. Israeli support for Kurdish forces in Iraq remained largely secretive and the existence of any relationship between the two sides was reportedly denied by Israel to the United States. Israel and Iran also helped to form the Kurdish intelligence agency Parastin, which engaged in various espionage operations against the Iraqi military. Bedirxan met with Israeli officials again in 1964, and Israeli Prime Minister David Ben-Gurion authorized Mossad to supply money and anti-aircraft weapons to the Kurds in Iraq. In May 1965, deputy-director of Mossad David Kimche and Israeli military chief Tzvi Tzur visited Kurdistan, where they met with Barzani in the town of Haji Omeran. The Israelis agreed to provide a large supply of weapons and funding to the Kurds, and delivered the promised resources by winter of that year. Israel also helped Peshmerga troops improve their tactics and training, and played a significant role in the capture of Mount Handrin, where the Peshmerga inflicted thousands of casualties on the Iraqi military. Barzani is known to have personally visited Israel twice in 1968 and 1973.

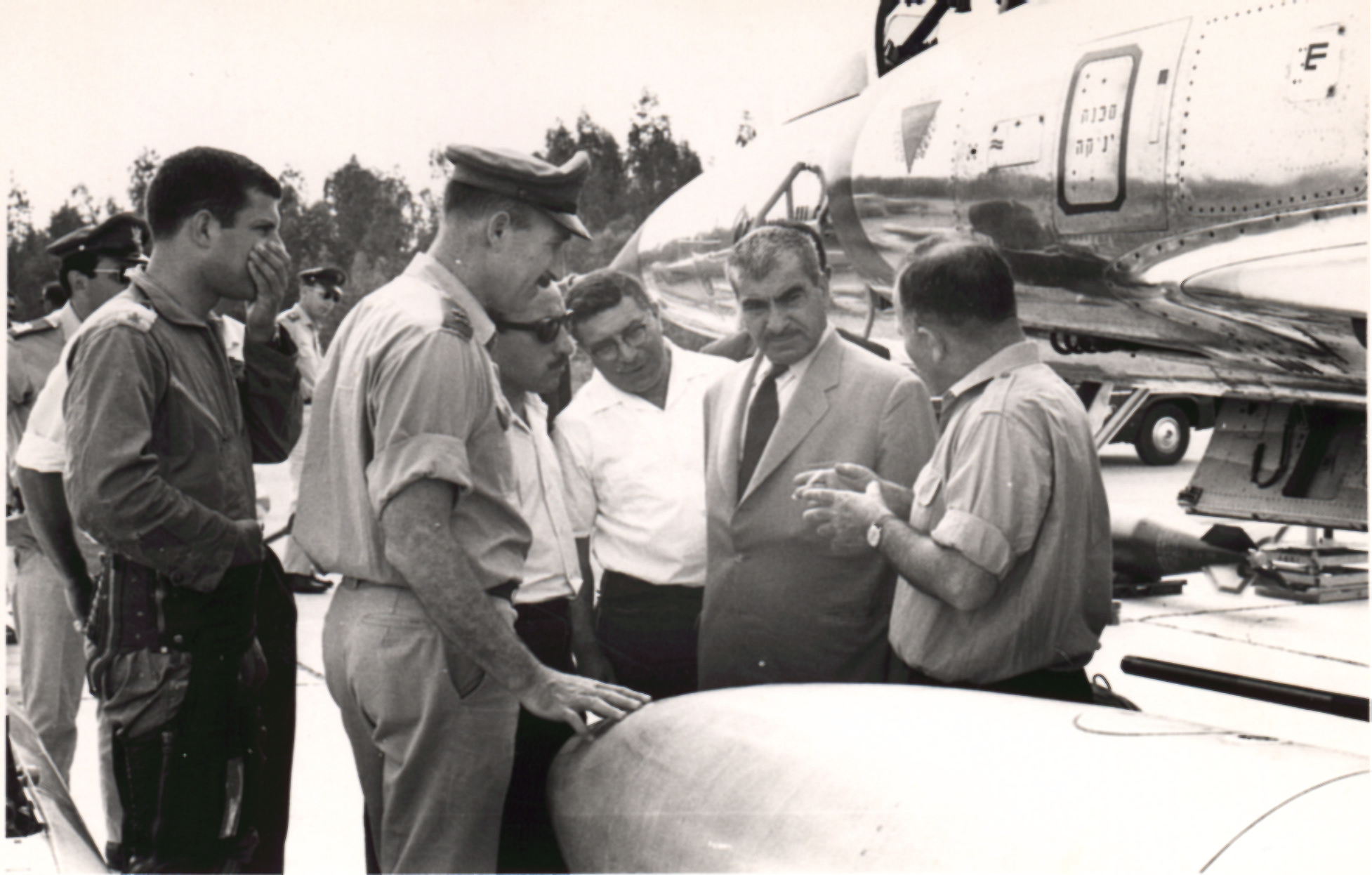
Kurdish nationalist leader Mustafa Barzani visiting Israel (c. 1975–1979)

The Iranian–Israeli–Kurdish alliance continued until the 1975 Algiers Agreement was signed between Iran and Iraq following heavy clashes between the two states over the Shatt al-Arab. Among the conditions of the treaty was Iran's agreement to end its support for the Kurds in Iraq. Iran's fulfillment of this condition resulted in friction in its relationship with Israel. The Israelis wanted to continue supporting the Kurds and had spent the preceding years pressuring the United States to increase its military assistance as a means to do so. Israel considered Iran's signing of the agreement to be a betrayal, and believed Iran would use the plight of the Kurds as a bargaining chip in its negotiations with Iraq. In response to the treaty, Israeli Prime Minister Yitzhak Rabin stated, "The Shah sold out the Kurds".

From the Kurdish perspective, relying on Israel was a way to pull the United States into the conflict. However, while Barzani supported the Israeli assistance, Jalal Talabani and Ahmed Barzani were against it.

Both Mossad and SAVAK urged the Iranian Shah to re-evaluate his position on the Kurds of Iraq following the Algiers Agreement, and the alliance gradually renewed by 1978 following the Second Iraqi–Kurdish War; the alliance effectively ceased to exist after the 1979 Iranian Revolution, which overthrew the Pahlavi dynasty and established the Islamic Republic of Iran. Despite the pan-Islamic and anti-Israel stance of the new theocratic government of Iran, Israel maintained its support for Iran as well as pro-Iran Iraqi-Kurdish forces after the outbreak of the Iran–Iraq War in September 1980.

=== During the Iran–Iraq War and Gulf War (1980–1991) ===
In 1982, the Yinon Plan was published in Israel. It argued that the Iran–Iraq War would ultimately split Iraq into three states and thus prove to be a strategic Israeli gain. During the Gulf War and subsequent anti-government uprisings in Iraq, Israel sent large supplies of humanitarian aid to the Kurds via the Iraq–Turkey border.

=== "Plan B" (2000s) ===
After the 2003 invasion of Iraq, Israeli Prime Minister Ariel Sharon pushed for the expansion of relations with Iraqi Kurds and for the establishment of "a significant presence on the ground" in Kurdistan; this plan was dubbed "Plan B" (Note: (Hebrew: תוכנית ב', romanized: Tochnit be) or Plan Bet) by Israel. In June 2004, Seymour Hersh wrote an article for The New Yorker wherein he claimed that Israel was supporting the Kurds militarily to counteract Iranian proxy groups and that Israeli intelligence operatives were present in Iraq's Kurdistan Region. While a CIA official acknowledged this claim, other American officials as well as Israeli and Kurdish officials denied it. In 2005, Yedioth Ahronoth reported that Kurdistan had received a large amount of Israeli-manufactured equipment and that Motorola Israel and Magal Security Systems was training the Peshmerga while employing former Israeli soldiers. That same year, the President of the Kurdistan Region, Masoud Barzani, stated that: "“[E]stablishing relations between the Kurds and Israel is not a crime since many Arab countries have ties with the Jewish state". In 2006, Israel condemned the BBC for reportedly filming Israeli forces training the Peshmerga. In 2008, Patriotic Union of Kurdistan leader Jalal Talabani met with Israeli Defense Minister Ehud Barak, prompting severe criticism from Arab-Iraqi leaders.

The Foreign Minister of the Kurdistan Region, Falah Mustafa Bakir, stated in 2010 that: "We have no problems with Israel. They have not harmed us. We can't be hating them just because Arabs hate them."

=== Relations since 2014 ===
In June 2014, Israel accepted independently-sold Kurdish oil at an Ashkelon port despite protests and criticism from Iraq. Israeli officials stated that the country was keen on strengthening ties with the Kurdistan Region to broaden its options for energy supplies. On selling oil to Israel, the government of the Kurdistan Region stated that the revenue was needed for its fight against the Islamic State of Iraq and the Levant. In the same month, Israeli Prime Minister Benjamin Netanyahu stated that the Kurds in Iraq are a "fighting people who have proven political commitment and political moderation, and they are worthy of their own political independence." In September 2014, Netanyahu further commented that Israel "supports the legitimate efforts of the Kurdish people to achieve their own state." After the 2017 Kurdistan Region independence referendum resulted in a 93 percent pro-independence vote, Iraqi forces retook a large portion of Kurdish-held territories. In response, Netanyahu stated that Israelis had a "deep natural longstanding sympathy" for the Kurds.

In 2017, almost half of the oil extracted from Kurdish oil fields was exported to Israel; Israeli buyers of Kurdish oil are mostly private companies who receive an average of approximately 300,000 barrels of oil daily.

In November 2023 commenting on the Gaza war, Iraqi Kurdistan President Nechirvan Barzani called for humanitarian aid for Gaza, for the Gaza war hostage crisis to resolve in the release of hostages, and the implementation of a two-state solution. Later that month he again called for a ceasefire and a two-state solution, adding that he did not want "Iraq to be involved in this war in any way".

== Humanitarian aid ==
=== Assistance from Israeli NGOs to Kurdistan in the 2010s ===
Following the Northern Iraq offensive against Kurdish forces by the Islamic State of Iraq and the Levant (ISIL), the Israeli non-governmental organization IsraAid, alongside the American Jewish Committee, announced its provision of urgent assistance to Christians, Yazidis and other non-Muslim minorities who had fled to the Kurdistan Region for safety. In October 2014, IsraAid agency provided humanitarian supplies to refugees within the Kurdistan Region who had fled the ISIL campaign. IsraAid provided supplies to 1,000 families in the city of Duhok in winter of that year, including beds, infant supplies and blankets. The IsraAid assistance was provided in collaboration with the Canadian ONEXONE humanitarian foundation, and was coordinated with authorities in Iraqi Kurdistan. The founding director of IsraAid Shahar Zahavi told Arutz Sheva that the Israeli humanitarian team was warmly received by the residents and refugees of the Kurdistan Region. By early 2015, IsraAid trucks provided 3,000 relief items to Dohuk to aid refugees.

== See also ==
- Foreign relations of Israel
- Foreign relations of Kurdistan Region
- Iran–Israel relations
- Iraq–Israel relations
- Iraqi–Kurdish conflict
- History of the Jews in Kurdistan
- Kurds in Israel
- Kurdish Jews in Israel
- Alliance of the periphery
- Israel–PKK relations

== Bibliography ==
- Abramson, Scott (2018), "A Historical Inquiry into Early Kurdish-Israeli Contacts: The antecedents of an alliance", The Journal of the Middle East and Africa, 9 (4): 379–399, doi:10.1080/21520844.2018.1548920, S2CID 150134620
- Bengio, Ofra (9 November 2017). "Has Israel's Support for Kurdistan's Independence Helped or Harmed the Kurds?". Begin-Sadat Center for Strategic Studies. 637.
- Bishku, Michael B. (2018), Israel and the Kurds: A Pragmatic Relationship in Middle Eastern Politics, vol. 41, Journal of South Asian and Middle Eastern Studies
- Mamikonian, Sargis (2005), Israel and the Kurds (1949-1990), vol. 9, Iran & the Caucasus, pp. 381–399
- Minasian, Sergey (2007). "The Israeli-Kurdish relations". 21st Century. 1.
- Reisinezhad, Arash (2018), The Shah of Iran, the Iraqi Kurds, and the Lebanese Shia, Springer, p. 357, ISBN 9783319899466
- Romano, David; Rojhilat, Shivan (2018), Danilovich, Alex (ed.), "Israel's periphery doctrine and the Kurds", Federalism, Secession, and International Recognition Regime: Iraqi Kurdistan, Routledge
