= Revaya =

Moshav in northern Israel

Revaya: רְוָיָה (Hebrew)
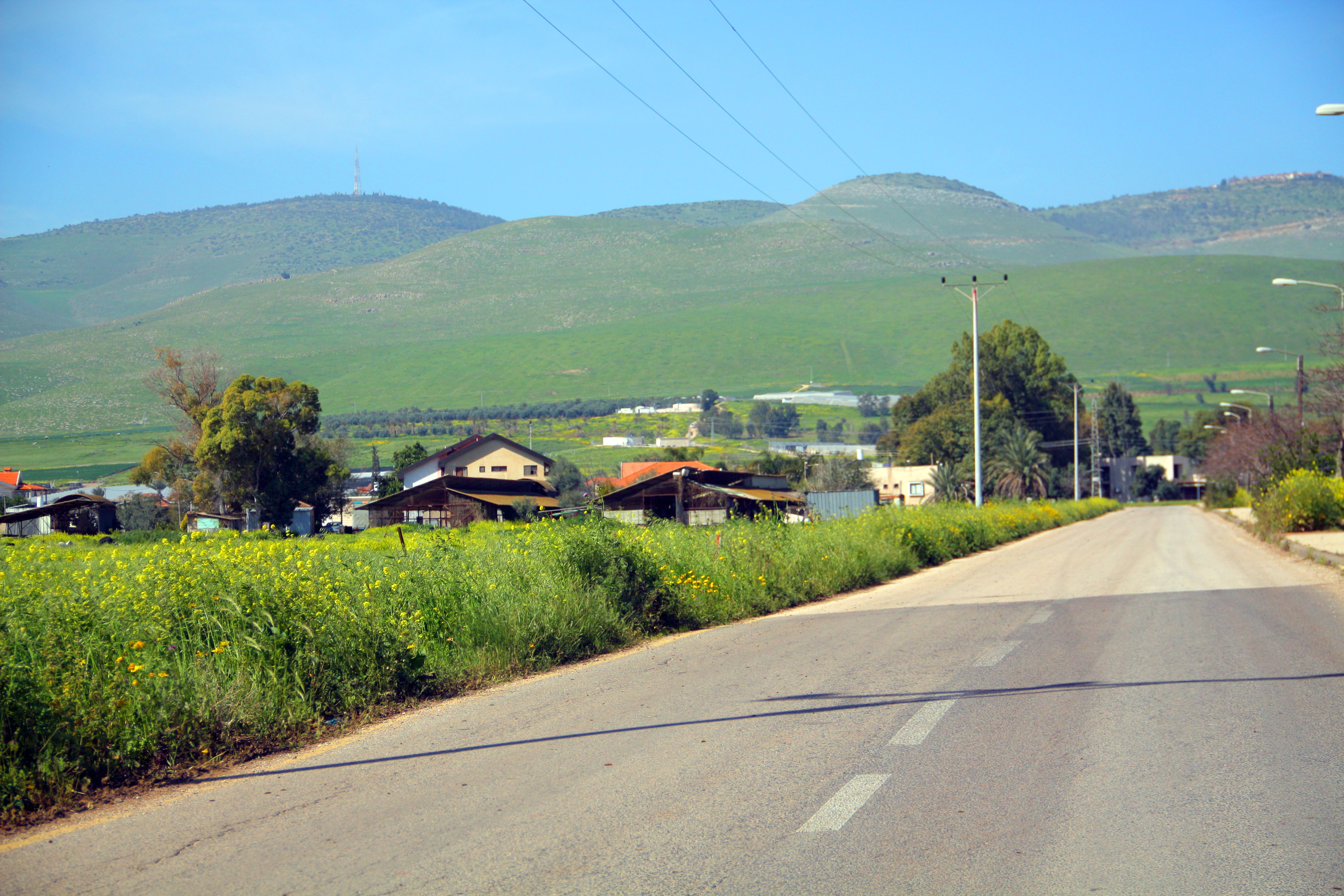

- Location within Jezreel Valley region of Israel
- Coordinates: 32°26′56″N 35°28′24″E
- Country: Israel
- District: Northern
- Subdistrict: Jezreel
- Council: Valley of Springs
- Affiliation: Hapoel Hamizrachi
- Founded: 1952
- Founder: Hapoel Hamizrachi
- Population (2024): 479

Revaya (Hebrew: רְוָיָה) is a moshav in the Beit She'an Valley in northern Israel. Located about six kilometres south of Beit She'an, near Sde Trumot and west of Israel Highway 90, it falls under the jurisdiction of Valley of Springs Regional Council. In 2024 it had a population of 479.

The moshav is one of four settlements established as a group: Revaya, Sde Trumot, Tel Teomim, and Rehov.

== History ==
The moshav was founded in 1952 by the Hapoel Hamizrachi organization and was settled by Jewish immigrants to Israel from Iraq and Morocco. It was originally named "Farwana B", corresponding to the adjacent "Farwana" (Tel Rehov); the name was later changed to Revaya, corresponding to the nearby Revaya spring (the Hebrew word "revaya" means "overflowing" or "saturated").

The moshav accepted some Ethiopian Jews who immigrated to Israel in the 1990s. As of 2000, Revaya encompassed about 2,000 dunams.
