= Erich Brauer =

Jewish ethnographer and artist

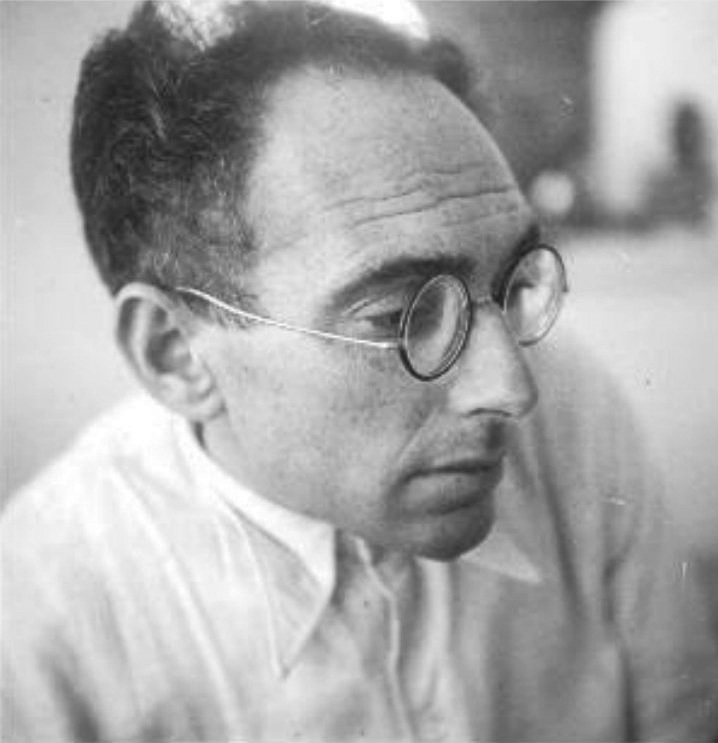
- Born: 28 June 1895; Berlin
- Died: 9 May 1942 (aged 46); Petah Tikvah

Erich Brauer (28 June 1895, in Berlin – 9 May 1942, in Petah Tikvah) was a German Jewish illustrator, ethnographer, and ethnologist. As an artist he chose to be known as Erich Chiram Brauer. He often signed his art work "Chiram".

== Early life ==
He was born in Berlin to Fanny (Krebs) and Adolf Brauer, when it was part of the German Empire under Prussian leadership. As a young man, his first interest was in graphics, and later he added studies in ethnology. Even after he had changed his vocation, he would still decorate his letters and writings with graphic artwork and would later make a livelihood from doing graphic artwork for the Jewish National Fund.

In Germany, Brauer belonged to Jung Juda (Young Judea), a Jewish youth movement consisting of German Jewish youth primarily drawn from assimilated Jewish families who had taken an interest in Zionism. One of the fellow members of this group whom he had befriended was Gershom Scholem. During the years of the First World War, 1915–1916, the two co-edited and published a lithographic magazine entitled, Die Blauweisse Brille ("Blue-and-White Eyeglasses"), in which three issues (50-100 lithographed copies) were printed in the printing press owned by Scholem's father, and which treated on the war from a Zionist-Jewish perspective, but written with a comical and humorous flair. Brauer is noted there for his expressionist style.

== Education and vocation ==
Erich Brauer completed his dissertation in 1924 at the University of Leipzig on the religion of the Herero of South-West Africa. The Folklore Museum of Leipzig sent Brauer to British Mandate Palestine in 1925 to collect ethnological artifacts of the Arabs living in the country. Although Brauer returned to Germany, Brauer would leave his native Germany in later life to settle permanently in British Mandate Palestine where he resided in Tel-Aviv, and afterwards in Jerusalem. In the early 1930s, Brauer returned to Germany to publish his newly written book in German, Ethnologie der jemenitischen Juden (Ethnology of Yemenite Jews), which was finally published in Heidelberg in 1934, under the Nazi regime. That same year, he was also awarded a Lord Plumer scholarship in recognition of his outstanding work in the field of anthropology. This enabled him to work as a research associate at the Hebrew University of Jerusalem, a post which he held for four years. In spite of his efforts, Brauer failed to make anthropology an area of academic interest at the Hebrew University of Jerusalem, but was only able to garner support for his own private research. When the university could no longer pay for his continued research in the field of anthropology, Brauer continued to conduct private research in the field, until illness forced him to stop.

== Contributions to ethnology ==
Brauer is the author of two major books, one of which treating on the Jews of Yemen (Ethnologie der jemenitischen Juden), and the other on the Jews of Kurdistan, a book later translated into English and Turkish. These two works are his most popular monographs, while his other works are articles written for various publications. On Brauer and on his first monograph, Shelomo Dov Goitein wrote with a sense of profound awe and affection: “Brauer was educated and trained in the Berlin school of ethnology, which was known for its acclaim at that time; he was a sharp-eyed investigator, and a man gifted with a deep humanity and wisdom. In addition to this, he was an outstanding draftsman and an excellent photographer. He was methodical and thorough. His book [on Yemenite Jewry] is considered a literary work that is a masterpiece in its field.” Brauer's book contains, among other things, a carefully analyzed study of native Yemenite Jewish terms, and the reproduction, with translations, of leading songs and proverbs.

Brauer's pioneering status, as reflected in his research on the Jews of Yemen and the Jews of Kurdistan, are recognized as milestones in the study of these communities in Israel, where he is considered one of the forefathers of local anthropology as it developed in Mandate Palestine.

Brauer suffered from a rare illness (Scheuermann's disease) and died at the age of 46 in Petah Tikvah, and was buried in Nahalat Yitzhak Cemetery in Givatayim. At his death, Brauer left behind him five original diaries, the transcripts of which were permanently deposited at the National Library of Israel by the Israel Ethnographic Society in 1975, as well as photocopies of texts and of a drawing. Goitein wrote a moving eulogy of the man upon his death, published in the book Shevūt Teiman (1945), saying of Brauer that he was the first scientific ethnologist in this country and the first who laid a basis for a comparative ethnology.

== Published works ==
Books:

- Ethnologie der jemenitischen Juden (Ethnology of Yemenite Jews), Heidelberg 1934
- The Jews of Kurdistan: An Ethnological Study (Heb. יהודי כורדיסתאן: מחקר אתנולוגי)(ed. Raphael Patai), Jerusalem 1947 (published posthumously); also published in English in Detroit: Wayne State University Press, 1993

Articles:

- Die Frau bei den südarabischen Juden (The woman among the South Arabian Jews), Berlin 1931
- Züge aus der Religion der Herero : ein Beitrag zur Hamitenfrage (Traits from the religion of the Herero: a contribution to the Hamite question), Institute of Folklore: Leipzig 1925
- "The Jews of Afghanistan" (Heb. יהודי אפגניסתאן), Sinai: Jerusalem 1944 (published posthumously)
- Agriculture and Industry among the Jews of Yemen (Heb. החקלאות והמלאכה אצל יהודי תימן), Jerusalem 1945 (published posthumously)

== Legacy ==
Because of Brauer's premature death, much of Brauer's research remains unpublished and is still in manuscript-form. Neither have most of his German publications been translated into English or Hebrew. Brauer's research in the fields of Yemenite Jewish agriculture and crafts has been translated into Hebrew and is published in Shevuth Teiman (1945), Yisrael Yeshayahu & Aharon Tzadok (ed.), Tel-Aviv. Brauer's description of Jewish clothing in Yemen, as described in his monograph Ethnologie der jemenitischen Juden, has been translated into Hebrew and published in Ma'ase Rokem. Dress and Jewelry in the Tradition of the Jews of Yemen (2008), Carmella Abdar (ed.), Tel-Aviv, pp. 19–33, while excerpts of the same are rendered in an English translation, published in Ascending the Palm Tree (2018), Rachel Yedid & Danny Bar-Maoz (ed.), Rehovot, pp. 159–168.

== See also ==
- Gershom Scholem
- An Inquiring Mind: Erich Brauer, Ethnographer of the Eastern Jews Website of The Israel Museum, Jerusalem
