= Itzik Kala =

Israeli singer of Kurdish Jewish descent

Itzhak "Itzik" Kala איציק קלה
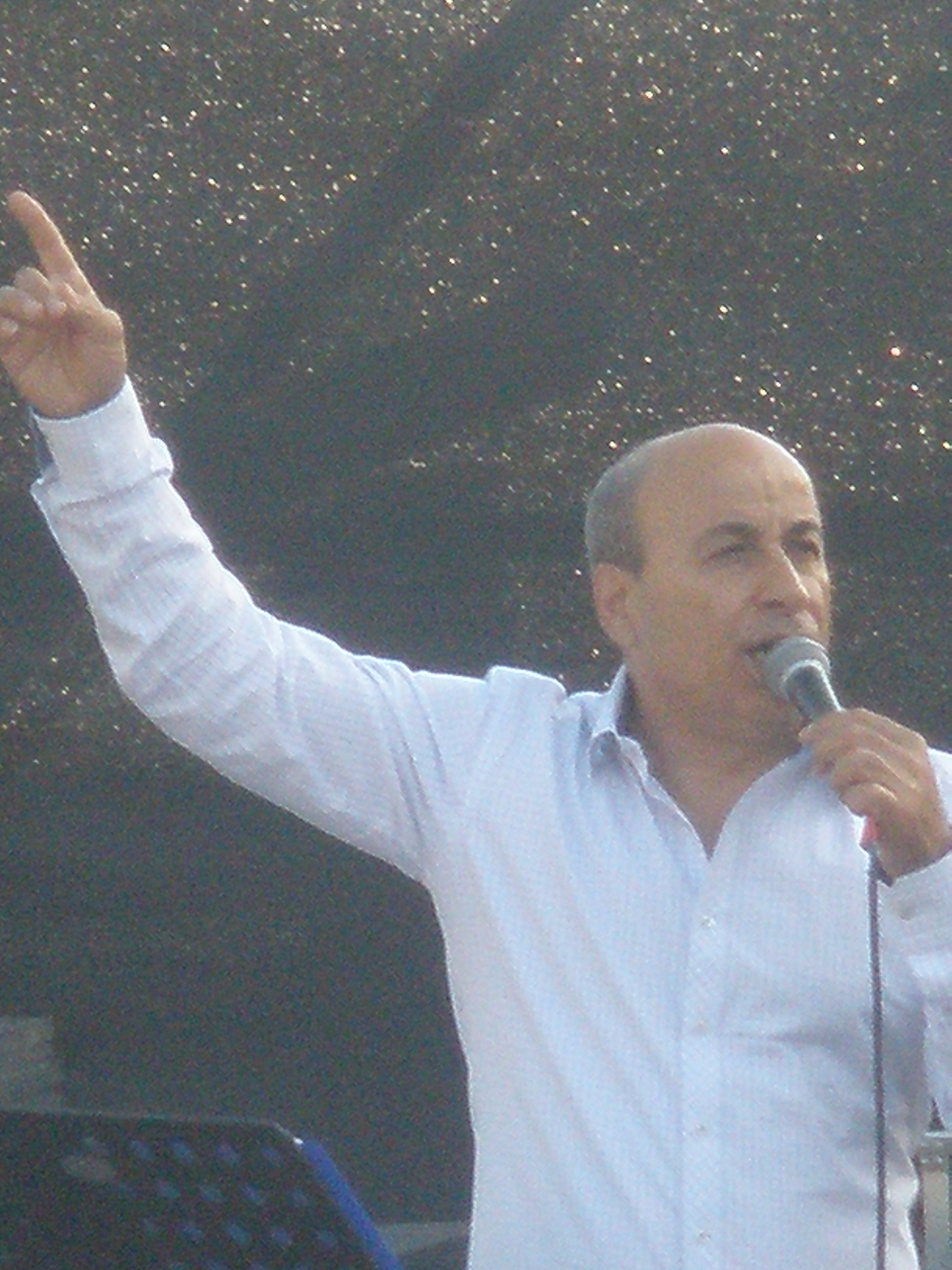
- Itzik Kala

Background information
- Origin: Israel
- Occupation: Singer
- Known for: Singing in Aramaic, Kurdish, and Hebrew
- Spouse: Ziona Kala

Itzhak "Itzik" Kala (Hebrew: איציק קלה) is an Israeli singer of Kurdish-Jewish descent who sings in Aramaic, Kurdish and Hebrew. He has released over 30 studio albums.

He is married to Ziona Kala.

In late 2012 his wife was severely injured by four Palestinian stone-throwers, spending several weeks in intensive care. The perpetrators (three of whom were minors) were arrested by the Israel Defense Forces in Husan.
