= Zvi Yehezkeli =

Israeli television journalist and documentarian

- צבי יחזקאלי
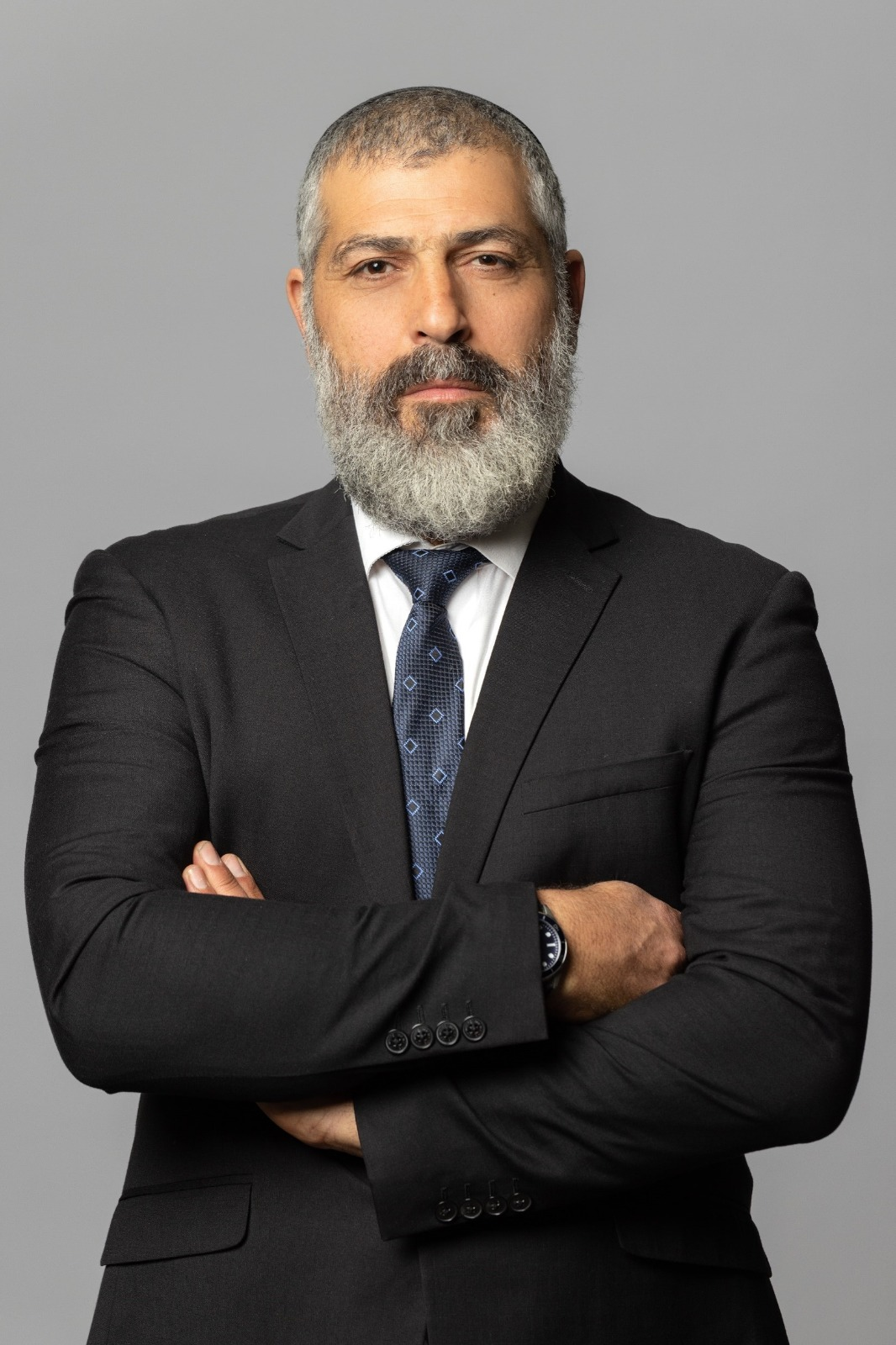
- Born: 17 August 1970 (age 56); Jerusalem
- Education: Hebrew University of Jerusalem
- Spouse: Meital
- Children: 8
- Presenting career
- Style: Investigative journalism
- Country: Israel

Zvi (Zvika) Yehezkeli (Hebrew: צבי (צביקה) יחזקאלי; born August 17, 1970) is an Israeli television journalist and documentarian. He is an commentator on Arab affairs.

== Biography ==
Yehezkeli was born in Jerusalem to a secular family with Iraqi Jewish and Kurdish Jewish origins. He has two younger sisters. His father's family immigrated from Iraq when he was a year old and his mother was born en route from Kurdistan to Israel. In the Israel Defense Forces, Yehezkeli served in an elite infantry unit. After completing his service, he worked for the Shin Bet, and traveled abroad for six years working as a security guard at embassies. He became interested in Islam while working in Europe and seeing Yitzhak Rabin shaking Yasser Arafat's hand during the Oslo I Accord ceremony on television. When he returned to Israel at the age of 25, he attended the Hebrew University in Jerusalem, majoring in Media and Middle East History, and studying Arabic, becoming fluent in the language. In 1997, he moved to Hebron, and then to Jenin, to achieve a better grasp of the Arab culture and language. In the early 2000s, Yehezkeli was a popular television presenter, and "lived a bachelor's life at high speed". After the Second Lebanon War, he planned to go on a 5-week tour of India. On the way, Yehezkeli stopped in Uman to visit the grave of Nachman of Breslov, and spent Shabbat with a religious family, deciding after to become a baal teshuva (returnee to Judaism). He is married to Meital and is the father of eight children. They live in the Gush Etzion settlement block.

== Media career ==
In 2010, Yehezkeli announced that President Mahmoud Abbas had a standing invitation to appear on Channel 10 to respond to allegations that several of his senior aides have embezzled international aid transferred to the Palestinian Authority.

In September 2012, Allah Islam, a documentary series about Muslims in Europe that Yehezkeli created with David Deri, debuted on Channel 10. In it, Yehezkeli stated that he went to Europe with an open mind to understand the worldview of the people he sought to interview. In 2015, Assaf David, a co-founder of the Forum for Regional Thinking, an Israeli think tank characterised Yehezkeli's style as being "hysterical", which played upon people's fears by accentuating the views of the extremists. Yehezkeli responded that what he has portrayed is the reality, and critics are free to go to Europe and produce their own documentaries.

At an international forum at Bar Ilan University in June 2013, Yehezkeli spoke about his interviews with Yasser Arafat: "In 2002 I sat with Palestinian Authority Chairman Yasser Arafat, whose government compound was under siege in Ramallah. I asked him how he interprets Western rationale, and he replied that he is not a partner to this rationale." Yehezkeli said he also asked Arafat about Israeli Prime Minister Ehud Barak's offer to accede to 99% of his demands. Arafat replied that Barak's offer was closer to 0% than to 100% because Barak refused to give in to all of his demands.

For a few months during 2016 and 2017, Yehezkeli went undercover in Europe and the United States under a variety of Arab aliases to investigate the Muslim Brotherhood's presence there. The fruit of his exploits, the 5-part series BeZehut Beduya (בזהות בדויה, Under a False Identity) aired on Channel 10 in February 2018. The series created some controversy, both in Israel and abroad, with online commenters speculating that the Mossad was involved in its production.

Yehezkeli is regarded as one of Israel's leading Arabists.

In the aftermath of the October 7 attacks, Yehezkeli advocated for the killing of 100,000 people in Gaza. In response to the killing of journalists in the Gaza war Yehezkeli stated: "If Israel has decided to eliminate the journalists, better late than never." He later apologized and said that he had not called for the killing of journalists, but instead of Gazans who used their press "credentials as cover to fight".

Yehezkeli has been scheduled to speak at two events organized by the Australian Jewish Association and other groups in March 2026. Former Israeli president Reuven Rivlin also stated that he would be present. Australian home affairs minister Tony Burke said that "It always surprises me when somebody who has made the sorts of comments that this individual has, advertises a speaking tour before they’ve even received a visa."

== See also ==
- Television in Israel
- Mista'arvim
