= Ilana Eliya =

Israeli singer

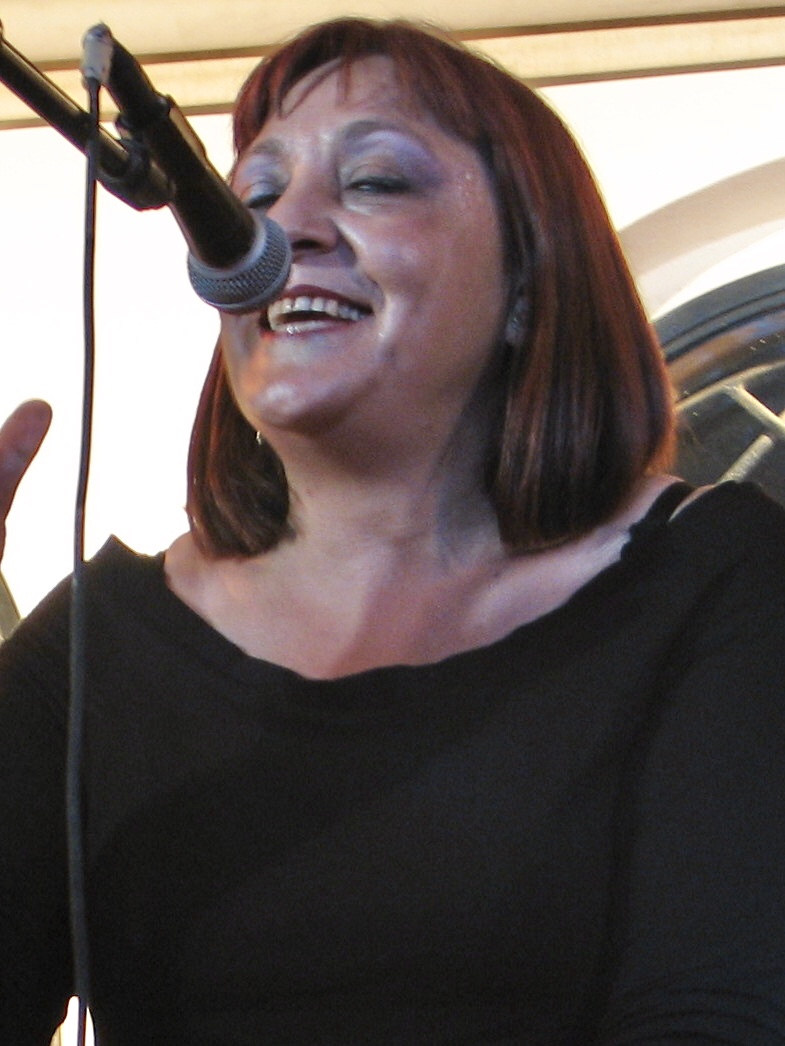
Jerusalem, Israel singer and musician of Kurdish roots, Ilana Eliya, summer '08.

Ilana Eliya (Hebrew: אילנה אליה; born April 24, 1955, in Jerusalem) is an Israeli singer of Kurdish descent.

== Biography ==
Ilana Eliya's family was originally from Iraqi Kurdistan and immigrated to Jerusalem shortly after the founding of Israel. In her childhood, she was heavily influenced by the musical and poetic career of her father. She heard Kurdish music early on and became interested in music.

As a teenager, there was no opportunity for her to do music education in East Jerusalem. Therefore, her parents sent her to the YMCA, where she sang arias and studied scripture.

She was focussing on Jewish religious music at that time. Soon after, she began her studies in ethnology and became increasingly interested in her Kurdish roots. At the latest after the death of her father in 1988, her interest in Kurdish music intensified, which led her to begin her musical career at the age of 37.

== Music style ==
Ilana Eliya's style is a mixture of ethnic music, Kurdish folklore and Israeli world music. She often sings traditional Kurdish songs in a new way with some affect of Israeli music scene, and for this reason, her style has formed a special feature in Kurdish music. Because in the style of Eliya and her band, oriental and western styles flow into each other and Kurdish and Israeli musical influences can be recognized in her work. The latter is reminiscent of the old Jewish Ashkenazi community, which someday have been located around the mountain Ararat (today in the settlement area of the Kurds).

== Musical creation ==
In 1992 Eliya released her first solo album called "Jabaliyo" (from the Kurdish-Arabic word Cebel, which means "son of the mountains"). The special feature of this album is that all songs were recorded accompanied by classical musical instruments and not reworked. Many of her recited songs are rooted in Kurdish folk music and are interpreted with her new style. Eliya's songs include political messages such as freedom of Kurdistan and the emancipation of women, and still other songs are about love and joy of living, which are particularly evident through her voice and singing.

== Albums ==
- 1992 – Jabaliyo
- 1996 – Ilana Eliya

== Performances ==
- Participation in several projects of Israeli filmmakers, u. A. by Mark Kopytman and Father General.
- Concerts in the US and Europe (Jewish Festival Krakow in 2010 and Brooklyn Academy of Music).
