= Haviv Shimoni =

Israeli politician (1933–1994)

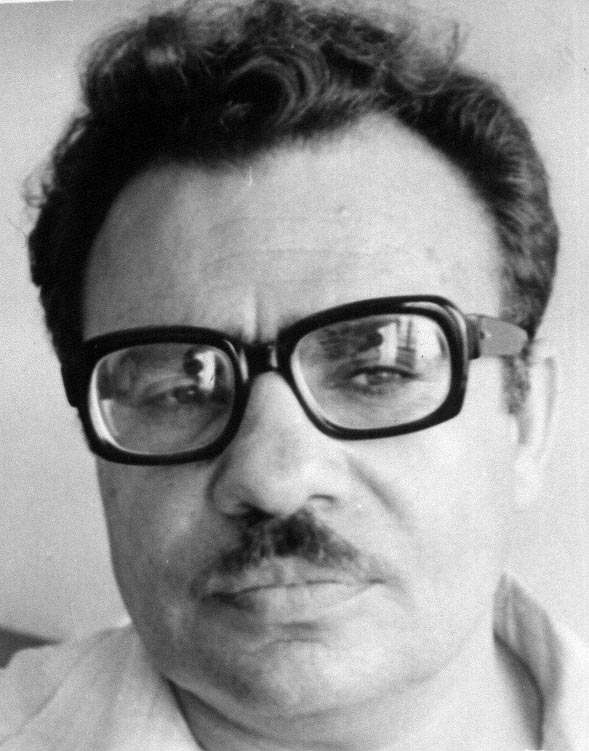
- Shimoni in the mid-1970s

Faction represented in the Knesset
- 1974–1977: Alignment

Personal details
- Born: 13 January 1933 Dohuk, Iraq
- Died: 13 July 1994 (aged 61)

Haviv Shimoni (Hebrew: חביב שמעוני; 13 January 1933 – 13 July 1994) was an Israeli politician who served as a member of the Knesset for the Alignment between 1974 and 1977.

== Biography ==
Born in Dohuk in northern Iraq, Shimoni emigrated to Mandatory Palestine in 1936. He later became the general secretary for the National Association of Kurdish Jews in Israel. He studied political science and Middle Eastern studies at the Hebrew University of Jerusalem, gaining a BA, and also received a certificate in Public Administration.

In 1951 he joined Mapai, becoming a member of the central institutions of its Jerusalem branch. From 1965 until 1969 he was a member of Jerusalem Workers Council, and from 1969 to 1973, and again from 1978 until 1984, a member of the city council. Between 1964 and 1973 he worked for the Ministry of Industry and Commerce, heading the workers committee in the ministry. He was responsible for product design, and chaired the directorate of the Israeli Centre for Product Design from 1973 until 1979, having been a member of the board of the Packaging Institute between 1964 and 1973.

He was on the Alignment list (an alliance of the Labor Party (which Mapai had merged into in 1968) and Mapam) for the 1973 elections, but failed to win a seat. However, he entered the Knesset on 14 February the following year as a replacement for the deceased Abd el-Aziz el-Zoubi. He lost his seat in the 1977 elections.

Shimoni died in 1994 at the age of 61.
