= Miki Geva =

Israeli actor

- מיקי גבע
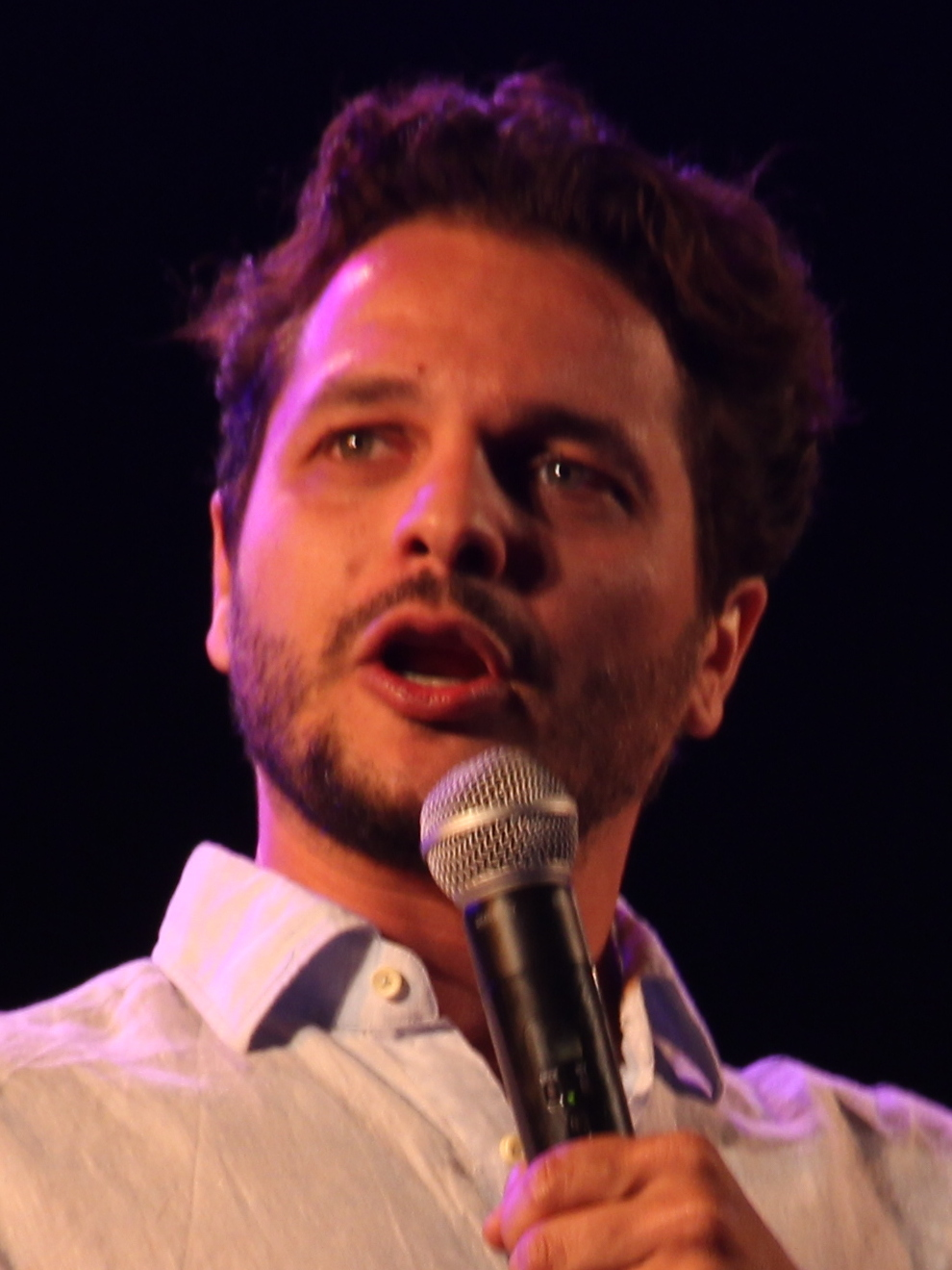
- Miki Geva
- Born: 9 October 1979 (age 46); Kiryat Malakhi, Israel

Miki Geva (Hebrew: מיקי גבע; born 9 October 1979) is an Israeli stand-up comedian, musician and actor.

== Biography ==
Geva was born and raised in Kiryat Malakhi. He performed for the first time at the age of nine in a local music festival and did his first stand-up show at 19. He served in the IDF as a driver and singer in the Signal Corps band. After his service he studied Psychology and Film at Tel Aviv University.

In the summer of 2001 he was selected to be a host on Arutz HaYeladim and later joined Erez Tal and Orna Banai's 'Only in Israel' where he was best known for his impersonation of Meir Sheetrit. He participated in shows like "Weekend", "Israel's National TV Team" and "Laughing from Work". He acted in the series "Five Men and a Wedding", "The Eight", "The Island", "Hasamba Generation 3".

He wrote the book 'From My Heart Express' which became a series and the series 'Falling Hard' whose second season is currently airing on Channel 10.

== Personal life ==
Geva is in a relationship with Sapir Zagury, and in 2016 they got married.
