= History of the Jews in Kurdistan =

Kurdistani Jews
יְהוּדִי כּוּרְדִּיסְטָן; جووە کوردستانییەکان; Cihûyên kurdistanî
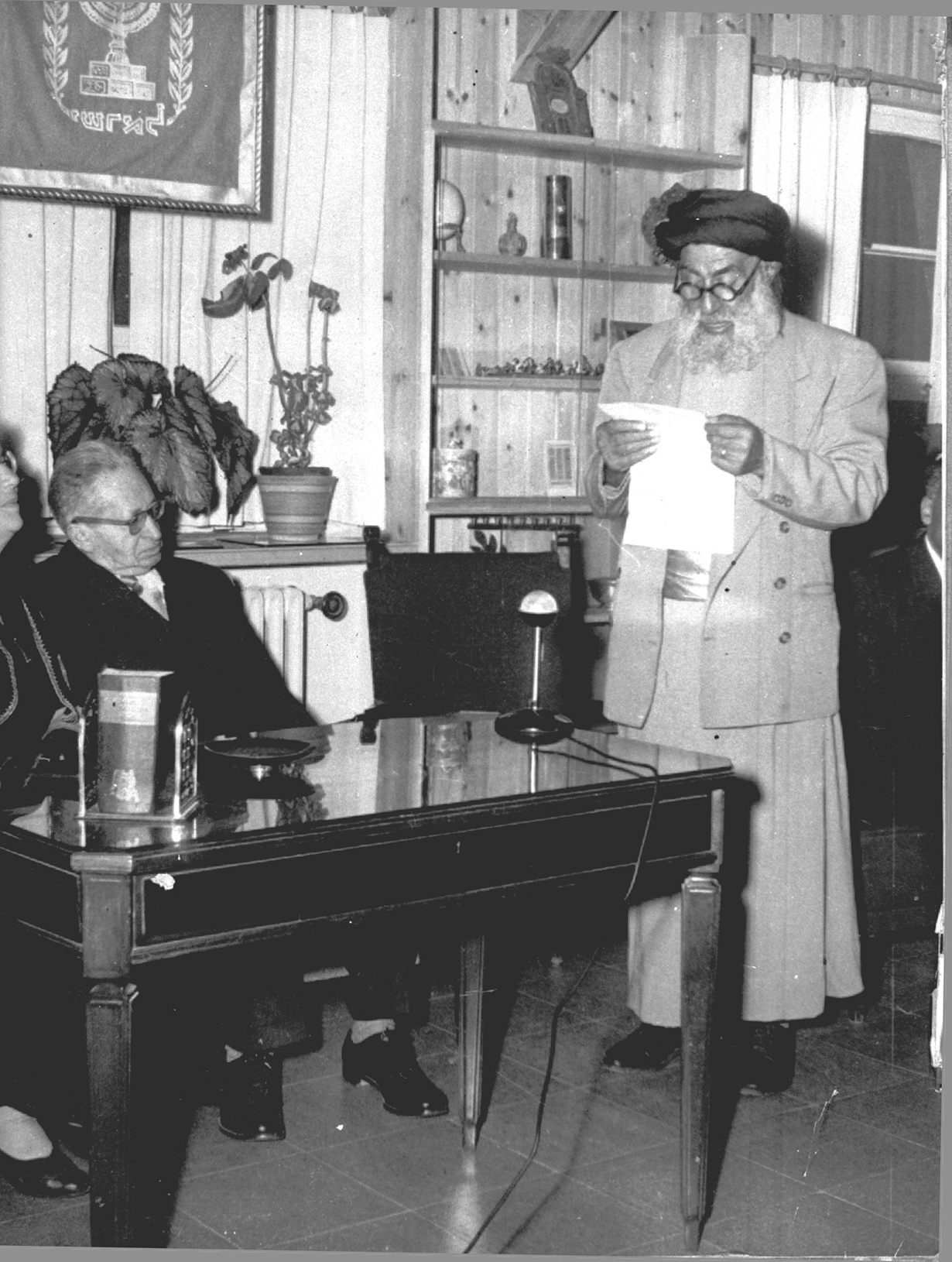
- Rabbi Moshe Gabai, head of the Jewish community of Zakho, with Israeli President Yitzhak Ben-Zvi in 1951

Total population
- 300,000

Regions with significant populations
- Israel: c. 300,000

Languages
- Northeastern Neo-Aramaic (mainly Judeo-Aramaic languages), Israeli Hebrew, Kurdish (mainly Kurmanji), Azerbaijani (in Iran); Mizrahi Hebrew (liturgical use)

Religion
- Judaism

Related ethnic groups
- Other Mizrahi Jews, in particular Iraqi Jews, Iranian Jews, Bukharian Jews, Turkish Jews, and Syrian Jews

Kurdistani Jews (Note: Kurdish: جووە کوردستانییەکان, romanized: Cihûyên kurdistanî; Hebrew: יְהוּדִי כּוּרְדִּיסְטָן, romanized: Yehudei Kurdistan.) are the Mizrahi Jewish communities from the geographic region of Kurdistan, roughly covering parts of northwestern Iran, northern Iraq, northeastern Syria and southeastern Turkey. Kurdistani Jews lived as closed ethnic communities until they were expelled from Kurdistan, as part of the wider expulsion of Jews from Arab and Muslim states in the 1940s–1950s. The native language of Kurdistani Jews was Judeo-Aramaic rather than Kurdish. As Kurdistani Jews natively adhere to Judaism and originate from the Middle East, Mizrahi Hebrew is used for liturgy. Many Kurdistani Jews, especially the ones who hail from Iraq, went through a Sephardic Jewish blending during the 18th century.

In the present day, the overwhelming majority of Kurdistani Jews reside in the State of Israel, with the community's presence coming as a direct result of either the Jewish exodus from Muslim states or the making of Aliyah by those remaining in the following decades (see Kurdish Jews in Israel).

== Identity ==
The historic Jewish community of Kurdistan were known as the Kurdistani Jews, Assyrian Jews, or the Jews of Zakho, while they referred to themselves as "anshei Targum", meaning "the people of Targum". They were often referred to as "Kurdistani Jews".

According to Barry Rubin, "a number of Jews living in northern Iraq among the Kurdish population considered themselves culturally Kurdish, and even in Israel some Iraqi Jewish immigrants still identify with that group."

== History ==
=== Middle Ages ===
According to the memoirs of Benjamin of Tudela and Pethahiah of Regensburg, there were about 100 Jewish settlements and substantial Jewish population in Kurdistan in the 12th century. Benjamin of Tudela also gives the account of David Alroi, the messianic leader from central Kurdistan, who rebelled against the Abbasid caliph al-Muqtafi and had plans to lead the Jews back to Jerusalem. These travellers also report of well-established and wealthy Jewish communities in Mosul, which was a commercial and spiritual center in close proximity to Kurdistan. Many Jews fearful of approaching crusaders had fled from Syria and Palestine to Babylonia and Kurdistan. The Jews of Mosul enjoyed some degree of autonomy in managing their own community.

=== Ottoman era ===
When the Ottomans captured Kurdistan, the social situation of Jews improved. The Jews generally felt safer under Turkish rule than under the protection of Kurdish tribes. Jews and Christians relied on the protection of Kurdish tribes, who would often refer to their Jewish and Christian subjects as "cihûyê min" (my Jew) or "filehê min" (my Christian). During conflicts between Kurdish tribes, the primary targets were the Jewish and Christian subjects of the Kurdish tribe rather than the Kursiaj tribe itself. Tanna'it Asenath Barzani, who lived in Mosul from 1590 to 1670, was the daughter of Rabbi Samuel Barzani of Kurdistan. She later married Jacob Mizrahi, Rabbi of Amadiyah (in Iraqi Kurdistan), who lectured at a yeshiva. She was famous for her knowledge of the Torah, Talmud, Kabbalah, and Jewish law. After the early death of her husband, she became the head of the yeshiva at Amadiyah and eventually was recognized as the chief instructor of Torah in Kurdistan. She was called tanna'it (female Talmudic scholar), practiced mysticism, and was reputed to have known the secret names of God. Asenath is also well known for her poetry and excellent command of the Hebrew language. She wrote a long poem of lament and petition in the traditional rhymed metrical form. Her poems are among the few examples of the early modern Hebrew texts written by women.

=== Soran era ===
Under the rule of Mir Muhammad the Jewish population was affected by violence and looting notably during the Siege of Amadiya. They “were treated with merciless cruelty and oppression." Many were forced to migrate and some fled the city after its fall. Similar reports are mentioned for other towns under his control, including Ranya, Khoy, Erbil, Aqra, and Zakho. After the Kurds sacked Mosul during the Yazidi campaign, they also killed the local Jews and Christians. Dr. Lobdell, an American missionary, visited Mir Muhammad in Urmia, where he wrote: “The Pasha of Ravendooz told me that when he was first appointed to that district (Urmia), three years since, Jews were bought and sold by the Koords as commonly as don-keys.”

Following the defeat of Mir Muhammad, Amadiya came under the rule of the Ottoman governor of Mosul. The situation of the Jewish community improved slightly.

=== Modern times ===
Since the early 20th century some Kurdish Jews had been active in the Zionist movement. One of the most famous members of Lehi was Moshe Barazani, whose family immigrated from Iraqi Kurdistan and settled in Jerusalem in the late 1920s.

The vast majority of Kurdish Jews were forced out of Iraqi Kurdistan and evacuated to Israel in the early 1950s, together with the Iraqi Jewish community. Almost all the Kurdish Jews of Iranian Kurdistan relocated mostly to Israel as well in the same period. It was reported that the Kurds mourned the loss of their Jewish neighbours and even maintained their synagogues.

The Times of Israel reported on September 30, 2013: "Today, there are almost 200,000 Kurdish Jews in Israel, about half of whom live in Jerusalem. There are also over 30 agricultural villages throughout the country that were founded by Kurdish Jews."

On October 17, 2015, the Kurdistan Regional Government named Sherzad Omar Mamsani as the representative of the Jewish community at the Ministry of Endowment and Religious Affairs, who was later dismissed following a period of absence for health reasons, with members of the Israeli Jewish community claiming that there were no Jews remaining in the Kurdistan Region, which they think was the reason for the resignation. In 2021 the sending of Hanukkah kits to Jews in Arab regions, including Kurdistan, indicates there may be remnants of Jewish communities there. There are no accurate statistics on the Jews of Kurdistan

== Historiography ==
One of the main problems in the history and historiography of the Jews of Kurdistan was the lack of written history and the lack of documents and historical records. During the 1930s, a German-Jewish ethnographer, Erich Brauer, began interviewing members of the community. His assistant, Raphael Patai, published the results of his research in Hebrew. The book, Yehude Kurdistan: mehqar ethnographi (Jerusalem, 1940), was translated into English in the 1990s. Israeli scholar Mordechai Zaken wrote a Ph.D. dissertation and a book, using written, archival and oral sources that traces and reconstructs the relationships between the Jews and their Kurdish masters or (chieftains also known as Aghas). He interviewed 56 Kurdish Jews altogether conducting hundreds of interviews, thus saving their memoires from being lost forever. He interviewed Kurdish Jews mainly from six towns (Zahko, Aqrah, Amadiya, Dohuk, Sulaimaniya and Shinno/Ushno/Ushnoviyya), as well as from dozens of villages, mostly in the region of Bahdinan. His study unveils new sources, reports and vivid tales that form a new set of historical records on the Jews and the tribal Kurdish society. His PhD thesis was commented by members of the PhD judicial committee and along with the book upon which it has been translated into several Middle Eastern languages, including Arabic, Sorani, Kurmanji, as well as French.

== Gallery ==
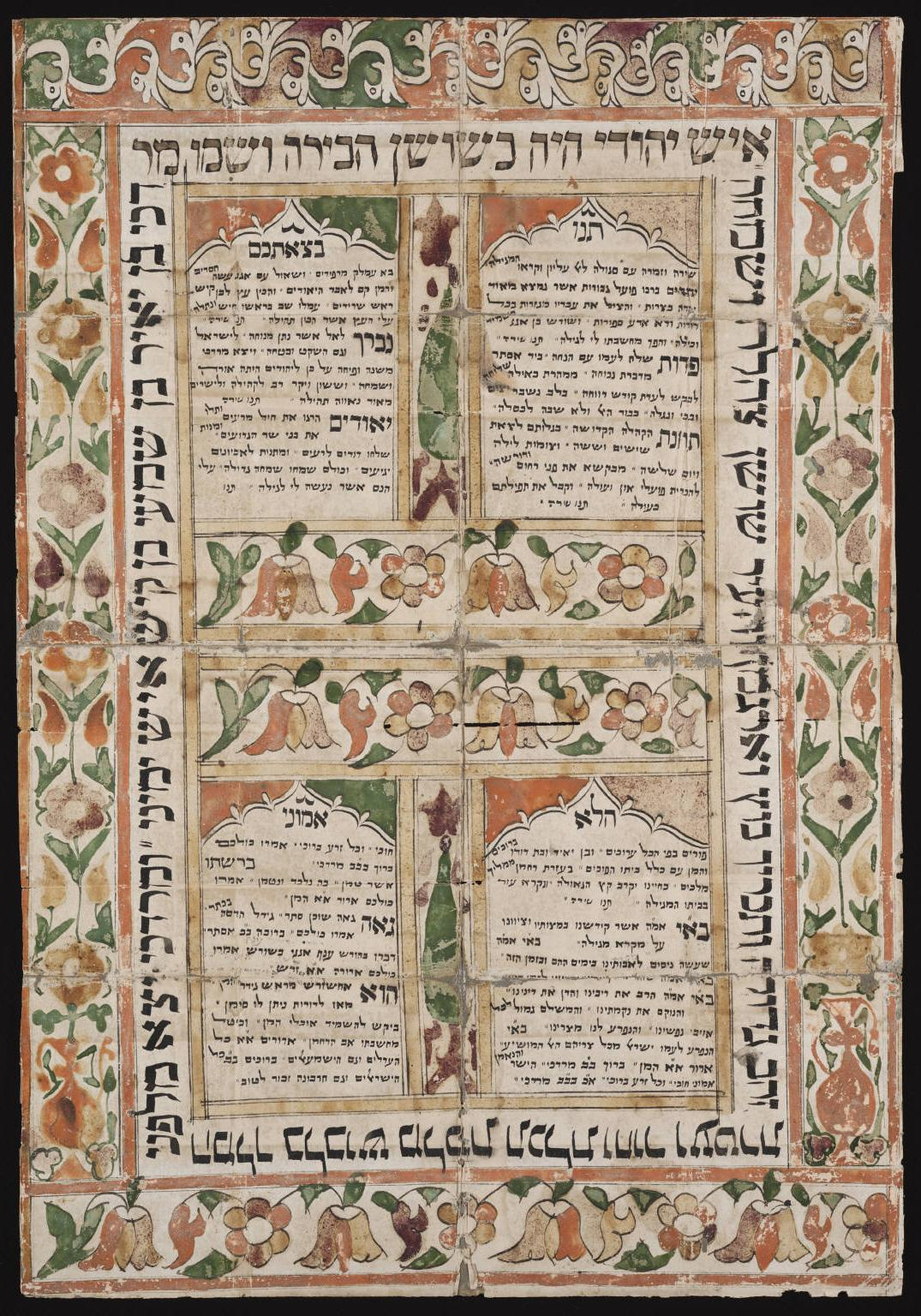
Illuminated plaque on paper with calligraphy and decorative elements. Includes four liturgical poems for Purim customary among Kurdish Jews; mid-19th century, Kurdistan

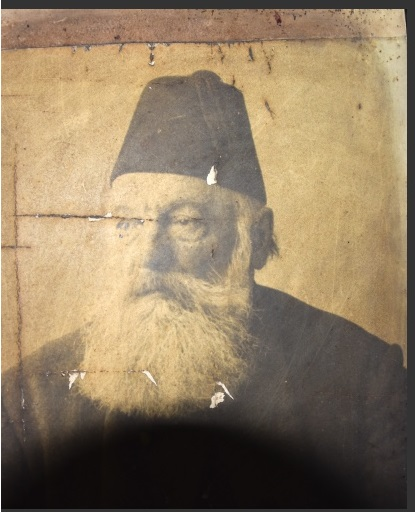
Jewish Kurd, 19th century, Ottoman era

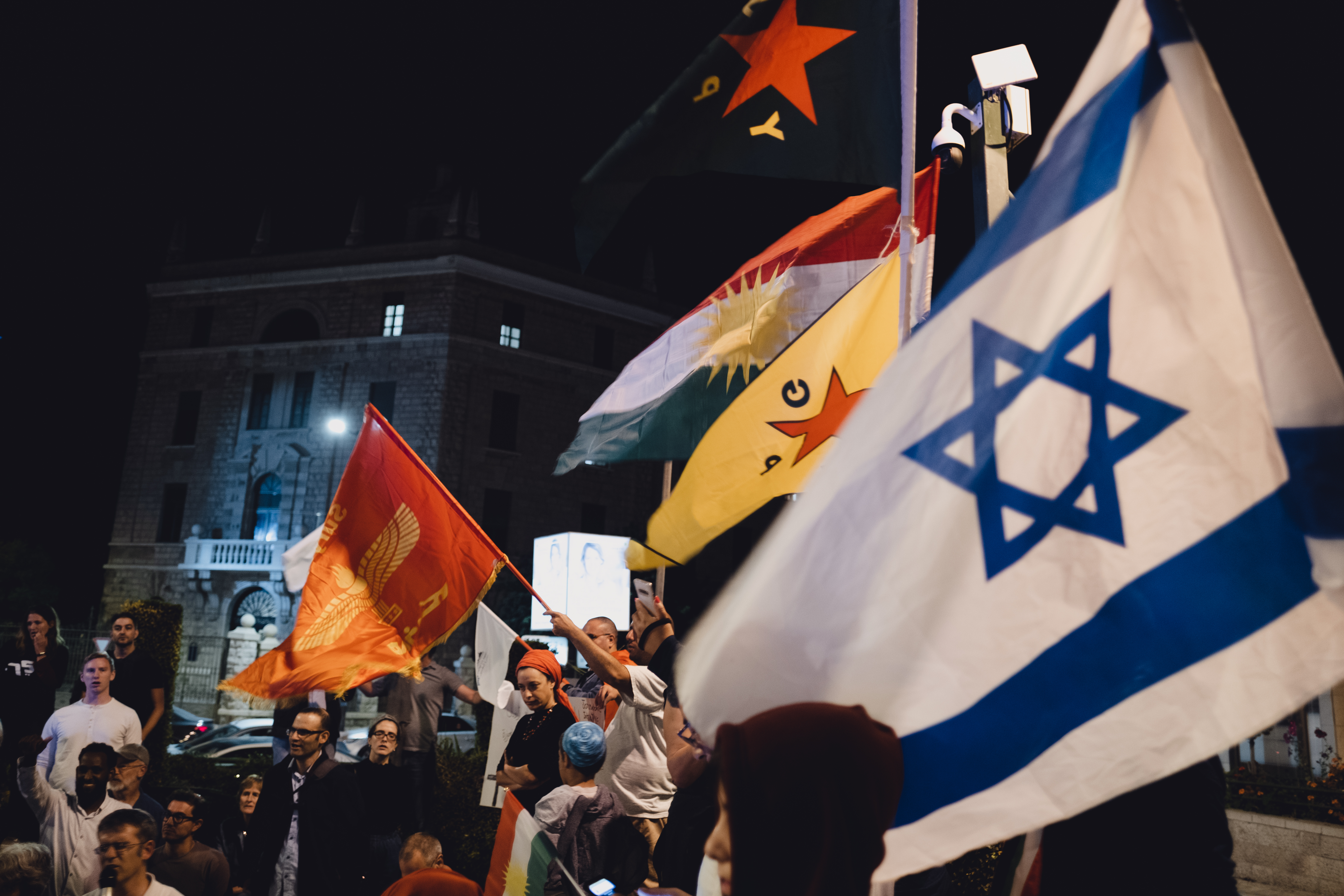
Views of the solidarity protest for Rojava organized by Kurdish Jews on October 12, 2019, in Jerusalem, Israel

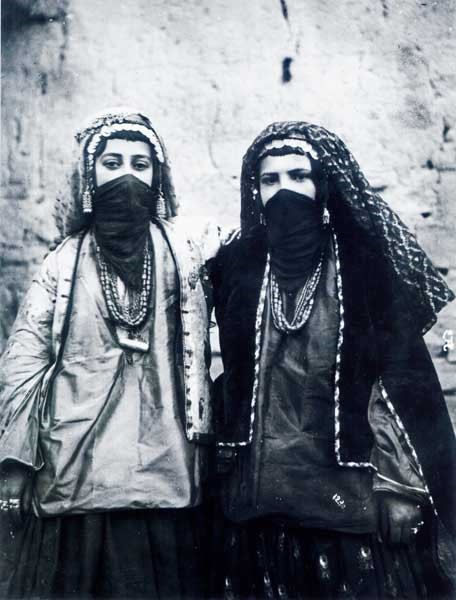
Jewish women from Saqqez, c. 1930

== See also ==
- History of the Jews in Iraq
- Israel–Kurdistan Region relations
- Jewish ethnic divisions
- Jewish diaspora
- Judeo-Aramaic
- Kurdish Jews in Israel
- Northeastern Neo-Aramaic
- Dönmeh

== Bibliography ==
- Mordechai Zaken, "Jewish Subjects and their tribal Chieftains in Kurdistan: A study in Survival", Jewish Identities in a Changing World, 9 (Boston: Brill Publishers, 2007)
- Brauer, Erich; Patai, Raphael, The Jews of Kurdistan. (Detroit: Wayne State University Press, 1993).
- Asenath Barzani, "Asenath's Petition", First published in Hebrew by Jacob Mann, ed., in Texts and Studies in Jewish History and Literature, vol.1, Hebrew Union College Press, Cincinnati, 1931. Translation by Peter Cole.
- Yona Sabar, The Folk Literature of the Kurdistani Jews (New Haven: Yale University Press, 1982, ISBN 0300026986).
- Ariel Sabar, My Father's Paradise: A Son’s Search for His Jewish Past in Kurdish Iraq. Illustrated. 332 pp. Algonquin Books of Chapel Hill. Biography & study of Yona Beh Sabagha = Yona Sabar, native scholar of this community and its language. Reviewed in The New York Times, Oct. 12, 2008 and The Washington Post, Oct. 26, 2008.
- Mahir Ünsal Eriş, Kürt Yahudileri - Din, Dil, Tarih, (Kurdish Jews) In Turkish, Kalan Publishing, Ankara, 2006
- Hasan-Rokem, G., Hess, T. and Kaufman, S., Defiant Muse: Hebrew Feminist Poems from Antiquity: A Bilingual Anthology, Publisher: Feminist Press, 1999, ISBN 1-55861-223-8. (see page 65, 16th century/Kurdistan and Asenath's Petition)
- Rabbi Asenath Barzani in Jewish Storytelling Newsletter, Vol.15, No.3, Summer 2000
- The Jews of Kurdistan Yale Israel Journal, No. 6 (Spr. 2005).
- Judaism in Encyclopaedia Kurdistanica
