= Iraqi–Kurdish conflict =

Series of wars and rebellions by ethnic Kurds against successive Iraqi administrations

- Part of spillover of Iranian–Kurdish, Kurdish–Turkish, and Syrian–Kurdish conflicts
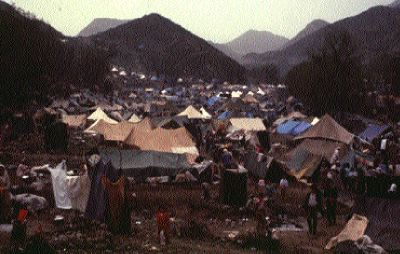
- Kurdish refugees in camps along the Turkey-Iraq border, 1991
Date	1919–present (107 years)
Location	Iraq
Status	Ongoing
Kingdom of Kurdistan (1922–1924)	Mandatory Iraq
KDP; PUK; ICP; INC; Islamic Supreme Council of Iraq; Iraqi Kurdistan; UNSC Resolution 688: United States; United Kingdom; France	Kingdom of Iraq; Iraqi Republic; Ba'athist Iraq; Republican Guard; Iraqi Ground Forces; Iraqi Police; Mukhabarat; National Defense Battalions (until 1991)
(Kurdistan Region) Kurdistan Regional Government (since 2005)	Central Government of Iraq (since 2005)

Commanders and leaders
Mahmud Barzanji; Ahmed Barzani; Mustafa Barzani; Idris Barzani; Masoud Barzani; Babakir Zebari; Qasim Shesho; Mahmoud Ezidi †; Margaret George Shello; Jalal Talabani; Ibrahim Ahmad; Ali Askari †; Nawshirwan Mustafa; Kosrat Rasul Ali; Mama Risha †; Uthman Abd-Asis; Ahmed Chalabi; Aziz Muhammad; (Iran) Mohsen Rezaee; (Iran) Ali Sayad Shirazi; Abdul Aziz al-Hakim; (United States) John Shalikashvili	Faisal I of Iraq; Faisal II of Iraq; Abd al-Karim Qasim (executed); (Iraq) Abdul Salam Arif (executed); (Iraq) Abdul Rahman Arif; (Iraq) Tahir Yahya (executed); (Iraq) Ahmed Hassan al-Bakr †; (Iraq) Saddam Hussein (executed); (Iraq) Ali Hassan al-Majid (executed); (Iraq) Taha Yassin Ramadan (executed); (Iraq) Izzat Ibrahim al-Douri; (Iraq) Tariq Aziz; (Iraq) Saddam Kamel; (Iraq) Qusay Hussein †; (Iraq) Uday Hussein †; (Iraq) Fuad Masum; (Iraq) Haider al-Abadi; (Iraq) Othman al-Ghanmi; (Iraq) Juma Inad

Strength
KDP: 15,000–20,000 (1962); 6,000 (1970); 50,000–60,000 (1974); KDP & PUK: 5,000 (1980); 100,000 (1991); Iraqi Kurdistan 70,000 (2003)	(Iraq) Iraqi Armed Forces: 48,000 (1969); 90,000 (1974); 180,000 (1978); 300,000 (1980); 1,000,000 (1988); 382,500 (1992); 424,000 (2002)

Casualties and losses
- 163,800–345,100 killed^{[a]} Millions of Kurds displaced and turned refugees

The Iraqi–Kurdish conflict consists of a series of wars, rebellions and disputes between the Kurds and the central authority of Iraq starting in the 20th century shortly after the defeat of the Ottoman Empire in World War I. Some put the marking point of the conflict beginning to the attempt by Mahmud Barzanji to establish an independent Kingdom of Kurdistan, while others relate to the conflict as only the post-1961 insurrection by the Barzanis.

Since the US-led invasion of Iraq and the subsequent adoption of federalism in 2005 and the recognition of the Kurdistan Region (KRI) as a federal region in the new Iraqi constitution, the number and scope of armed clashes between the central government of Iraq and the Kurds have decreased. In spite of that, however, the major issue that continues to cause disputes is the implementation of Article 140 of the Constitution of Iraq. In September 2023, following a series of punitive measures by the central government in Iraq against KRI, Masrour Barzani sent a letter to the President of the United States expressing concerns about a possible collapse of Kurdistan Region, and calling for the United States to intervene. In March 2024, after several court rulings issued against Kurdistan Region by the Supreme Court of Iraq, Kurdish authorities in Iraq expressed dissatisfaction at what they described as an evident shift of the political system in Iraq back towards centralism.

== Overview ==
The first chapter of the Iraqi–Kurdish dispute followed the end of World War I and the arrival of British forces. Mahmud Barzanji began secession attempts in 1919 and in 1922 proclaimed the short-lived Kingdom of Kurdistan. Though Mahmud's insurrections were defeated, another Kurdish sheikh, Ahmed Barzani, began to actively oppose the central rule of the Mandatory Iraq during the 1920s. The first of the major Barzani revolts took place in 1931, after Barzani, one of the most prominent Kurdish tribal leaders, succeeded in defeating a number of other Kurdish tribes. He ultimately failed and took refuge in Turkey. The next serious Kurdish secession attempt was made by his younger brother Mustafa Barzani in 1943, but that revolt failed as well, resulting in the exiling of Mustafa to Iran, where he participated in an attempt to form the Kurdish Republic of Mahabad.

In 1958, the younger Barzani and his fighters returned to Iraq from exile, and an attempt was made to negotiate Kurdish autonomy in the north with the new Iraqi administration of Gen. Abdul Karim Qassim. The negotiations ultimately failed and the First Iraqi–Kurdish War erupted on 11 September 1961, lasting until 1970 and resulting in 75,000–105,000 casualties. Despite the attempts to resolve the conflict by providing Kurds with recognized autonomy in northern Iraq, the negotiations failed in 1974, leading to resumed hostilities known as the Second Iraqi–Kurdish War, which resulted in the collapse of the Kurdish militias and the reconquest of northern Iraq by Iraqi government forces. As a result, Mustafa and most of the KDP leadership fled to Iran, while the nascent PUK, led by Jalal Talabani gained power in the vacuum, and lead an insurgency campaign against the central Iraqi government, which eventually also failed. During the period between 1976 and 1977, intra-Kurdish conflict climaxed with KDP and PUK both dealing blows against each other in a string of tit for tat raids. The most notable Ba'athist Arabization campaigns in northern Iraq happened in the late 1970s.

The conflict re-emerged as part of the Iran–Iraq War, with the two Kurdish parties collaborating against Saddam Hussein, while receiving military support from the Islamic Republic of Iran. By 1986, the Iraqi government conducted a genocidal campaign known as Al-Anfal, to oust the Kurdish fighters and take revenge on the Kurdish population—an act often described as the Kurdish genocide, with an estimated 50,000–200,000 casualties. The Iran-Iraq war ended in 1988.

In the aftermath of the Gulf War, in 1991, a series of uprisings happened in the north and south of the country. This, combined with the enforcing of the northern-southern no-fly zones by the United States, United Kingdom and France, and the subsequent withdrawal of the Iraqi armed forces from parts of northern Iraq, allowed the Kurds to regain control in the north by filling the vacuum. In the mid-1990s the internal conflict between the KDP and PUK erupted once again, resulting in a bloody civil war, with Iraq and Iran supporting both KDP and PUK respectively. The conflict ended in 1997, with the signing of the Washington Agreement.

Another critical event was the invasion of Iraq in 2003, which resulted in the toppling of the Ba'athist regime and the adoption of federalism. Despite the constitutional recognition of Kurdistan Region as a federal region in the Republic of Iraq, relations between Kurdistan Region and the Iraqi central government grew strained between 2011 and 2012 due to power-sharing issues and the export of oil. Following the failed Kurdish independence referendum in 2017, as well as the subsequent defeat of the Peshmerga at the hands of the Iraqi armed forces in the 2017 Iraqi–Kurdish conflict, Iraq has since taken steps to weaken Kurdistan Region and expand its own authorities in order to shift the political dynamics of the country back towards a centralised political system; the one it had before the invasion.

== Events ==
=== Pre Iraqi independence era ===
==== Mahmud Barzanji (1919–1924) ====
Mahmud Barzanji revolts were a series of armed uprisings against the British forces in the newly conquered Mesopotamia and later the British Mandate in Iraq. Following his first insurrection in May 1919, Sheykh Mahmud was imprisoned and eventually exiled to India for a one-year period. When he returned he was once again appointed a governor, but shortly afterwards revolted again and declared himself the ruler of the Kingdom of Kurdistan. The Kingdom of Kurdistan lasted from September 1922 – 1924. With British forces greatly exceeding his in ammunition and training, Barzanji was finally subdued and the region reverted to central British Iraqi rule in 1924. Sheykh Mahmud retreated into the mountains, and eventually reached terms with the independent Kingdom of Iraq in 1932, over his return from the underground. Shaykh Mahmud revolts are considered the first chapter of the modern Iraqi–Kurdish conflict.

==== 1931 Kurdish revolt ====
Ahmed Barzani revolt refers to the first of the major Barzani revolts, taking place in 1931 after Ahmed Barzani, one of the most prominent Kurdish leaders in Southern Kurdistan, succeeded in unifying a number of other Kurdish tribes. The Barzan forces were eventually overpowered by the Iraqi Army with British support, forcing the leaders of Barzan to go underground.

Ahmed Barzani was later forced to flee to Turkey, where he was held in detention and then sent to exile in the south of Iraq. Although initially a tribal dispute, the involvement of the Iraqi government inadvertently led to the growth of Shaykh Ahmad and Mulla Mustafa Barzani as prominent Kurdish leaders.

=== Kingdom era ===
==== 1943 Kurdish revolt ====
The 1943–1945 Kurdish revolt in Iraq was a Kurdish nationalistic insurrection in the Kingdom of Iraq, during World War II. The revolt was led by Mustafa Barzani and later joined by his older brother Ahmed Barzani, the leader of the previous Kurdish revolt in the Kingdom of Iraq. The revolt, initiating in 1943, was eventually put down by Iraqi military assault in late 1945, combined with the defection of a number of Kurdish tribes. As a result, the Barzanis retreated with much of their forces into Iranian Kurdistan, joining the local Kurdish elements in establishing the Republic of Mahabad.

=== Republic era ===
==== Negotiations over Kurdish autonomy (1958–1960) ====
After the military coup by Abdul Karim Qasim in 1958, Mustafa Barzani was invited by new Iraqi President Qasim to return from exile, and was greeted with a "hero's welcome", as a former dissident to the now abolished Iraqi monarchy. As part of the deal arranged between Qasim and Barzani, Qasim promised to give the Kurds regional autonomy in return for Barzani's support for his policies. Meanwhile, during 1959–60, Barzani became the head of the Kurdistan Democratic Party (KDP), which was granted legal status in 1960.

==== First Iraqi–Kurdish War (1961–1970) ====
First Iraqi–Kurdish War or Barzani Rebellion was a major event of the Iraqi–Kurdish conflict, lasting from 1961 to 1970. The struggle was led by Mustafa Barzani in an attempt to establish an independent Kurdish state in northern Iraq. Throughout the 1960s the uprising escalated into a long war, which failed to resolve despite internal power changes in Iraq. The war ended with a stalemate by 1970, resulting in between 75,000 to 105,000 casualties. A series of Iraqi–Kurdish negotiations followed the war in an attempt to resolve the conflict.

=== Ba'thist era ===
==== Cease-fire (1970–1974) ====
A Kurdish Autonomy agreement was reached in March 1970 by the Iraqi government and the Kurds, in the aftermath of the First Iraqi–Kurdish War, for the creation of an Autonomous Region, consisting of the three Kurdish governorates and other adjacent districts that have been determined by census to have a Kurdish majority. The plan also gave Kurds representation in government bodies, to be implemented in four years. For its time it was the most serious attempt to resolve the long-running conflict.

==== Second Iraqi–Kurdish War (1974–1975) ====
Second Iraqi–Kurdish War was an offensive, led by Iraqi forces against rebel KDP troops of Mustafa Barzani during 1974–75. The war came in the aftermath of the First Iraqi–Kurdish War (1961–70), as the 1970 peace plan for Kurdish autonomy had failed to be implemented by 1974. Unlike the previous guerilla campaign, waged by Barzani, the 1974 war was an attempt for symmetric warfare against the Iraqi Army, which eventually led to the quick collapse of the Kurds, lacking advanced and heavy weaponry. The war ended with the exile of the Iraqi KDP and between 7,000 and 20,000 deaths on both sides.

==== Arabization of northern Iraq and PUK insurgency (1976–1979) ====
The PUK insurgency was a low-level militant campaign by the Patriotic Union of Kurdistan (PUK) against the state of Iraq, after the defeat of the Kurdistan Democratic Party (KDP) in the Second Iraqi–Kurdish War, which forced the KDP organization to declare a ceasefire and move into exile. Due to lack of foreign support, however, the guerrillas were only able to operate in the highest regions of northern Iraq's mountains. The PUK also faced the KDP, the KDPI, led by Abdul Rahman Ghassemlou, and Iran supporting the Iraqis at various occasions. The insurgency dimmed with the 1979 Kurdish rebellion in Iran.

Ba'athist Arabization campaigns in North Iraq were forced displacement and cultural Arabization of minorities (Kurds, Yezidis, Assyrians, Shabaks, Armenians, Turkmen, Mandeans), in line with settler colonialist policies, led by the Ba'athist government of Iraq from 1960s to early 2000s, in order to shift the demographics of North Iraq towards Arab domination. The Baath party under Saddam Hussein engaged into active expulsion of minorities from the mid-1970s onwards. The campaigns took place during the Iraqi–Kurdish conflict, being largely motivated by the Kurdish-Arab ethnic and political conflict.

The policies are sometimes referred as "internal colonialism", described by Francis Kofi Abiew as a "Colonial 'Arabization'" program, including large-scale Kurdish deportations and forced Arab settlement in the region.

==== Kurdish rebellion during the Iran–Iraq War (1980–1988) ====
Between 1980 and 1988, the conflict intensified as the Iran–Iraq War commenced. One of the groups targeted in particular by Iraqi authorities were the Feyli Kurds, a community of Shi'ite Kurds settled in the southern area of the Zagros Mountains near Iraq's border with Iran. Saddam Hussein considered the group as 'Iranians' and began a campaign to drive the settlers out of the area as a part of his 'Arabization' policy in 1980., Saddam Hussein was severely critical of the Kurdistan Democratic Party (KDP) as they aligned forces with Iran in the conflict. In 1983, to avenge this liaison, he ordered the Army to abduct as many as 8,000 men and boys from Erbil province, where the clan of Barzani Kurds was based. Massoud Barzani, the leader of the clan and the KDP, himself lost 37 members of his family to the Iraqi troops. They were reported to having been sent to Nugra Salman prison in the southern deserts of Iraq, where they were tortured. Subsequently, the remains of 512 Barzani men were discovered in a mass grave. On March 16, 1988, Iraqi troops began shelling the Kurdish town of Halabja, in retaliation for an attack on Iraqi positions carried out by Iranian Revolutionary Guards and the aligned Peshmerga fighters. Subsequently, the town was attacked with a mix of chemical substances such as VX (nerve agent), sarin and mustard gas (see Halabja chemical attack). Over 5,000 people are believed to have been killed in the attack, which was considered to be a part of the Al-Anfal Campaign, directed against Kurds by the government under the command of Ali Hassan al-Majid, head of the Northern Bureau of the Ba'ath Party.

==== 1991 Kurdish uprising ====
On 2 August 1990, Saddam launched a military invasion onto neighboring Kuwait, reportedly due to its vast oil reserves, which would have helped him pay off the debts he owed to other countries during the Iran–Iraq War (see Gulf War). Within 24 hours, the Emir of Kuwait had fled. However, subsequently, an international coalition force consisting of American, British, Saudi and other troops liberated the country in 1991 and Iraqi troops were forced out of Kuwait (see Operation Desert Storm). Subsequently, one month after the Gulf War in February 1991, United States President George H. W. Bush called on the Iraqi people to stage an uprising against Saddam Hussein. This was followed by a series of rebellions in many parts of the country, such as the south by Shi'ite groups such as SCIRI and the Islamic Da'awa Party in what is known as the Sha’ban revolution. Meanwhile, the Kurds in the north staged their own uprising for autonomy, under the leadership of Massoud Barzani, leader of the Kurdistan Democratic Party, and Jalal Talabani, leader of the Patriotic Union of Kurdistan. The Peshmerga were trained into hardened guerrillas, who managed to infiltrate the Jash, a Saddam-orientated Kurdish militia (see Jash (term) and National Defense Battalions (Iraq)). The rebels soon managed to capture the town of Ranya, Sulaimaniya and ultimately the oil center of Kirkuk. Saddam retaliated swiftly, battering Kirkuk with artillery and targeting hospitals in particular. Geographically the towns captured by the Kurdish rebels were difficult to defend as they sat on plains below mountains. The rebels were forced to retreat in the mountains, where reportedly the Iraqi helicopters threw flour on them (which was believed to be a grim legacy of the reputed powdery chemical weapons which were used by the Iraqi administration during the Al-Anfal Campaign).

==== Iraqi no-fly zones ====
In August 1991, the United States, United Kingdom and France enforced two no-fly zones in Iraq after the latter's loss in the Gulf War, one in the north and one in the south. This gave the Kurds de facto autonomy in the north for the first time, and the Shias in the south a sense of security after they had taken part in their own uprising against Saddam, which is referred to as the Sha'ban revolution. The no-fly zones effectively ended with the start of the Iraq war.

The "two-state solution" for the conflict refers to the permanent separation of Kurdish-populated areas from Iraq, as opposed to retaining Iraqi unity within a federal state. It would change the long-term status which has existed in the country following the formation of the Kurdish autonomy in Northern Iraq in 1991 facilitated by the enforcement of the no-fly zones. Another solution that has been proposed is the "three-state solution", dividing the country into three independent states for its three major components: the Shia Arabs, the Sunni Arabs and the Kurds.

==== Kurdish Civil War (1994–1997) ====
The Iraqi Kurdish Civil War was a military conflict, which took place between rival Kurdish factions in the mid-1990s; that is, between the Patriotic Union of Kurdistan and the Kurdistan Democratic Party. Over the course of the conflict, Kurdish factions from Iran and Turkey, as well as Iranian, Iraqi and Turkish forces were drawn into the fighting, with additional involvement from the American forces. Between 3,000 and 5,000 fighters and civilians were killed throughout more than 3 years of warfare.

==== Operation Viking Hammer ====
Arriving in July 2002 to Iraqi Kurdistan, the CIA seldom worked with the Peshmerga, despite their claim to be on a counterterrorism mission against Ansar al-Islam. To the disappointment of PUK Peshmerga intent on destroying Ansar al-Islam, the true mission of the CIA was to acquire intelligence about the Iraqi government and military. CIA-Peshmerga operations eventually went beyond the scope of intelligence gathering however, as PUK Peshmerga were used to destroy key rail lines and buildings prior to the U.S. attack in March 2003. Following Turkey's decision to deny any official use of its territory, the Coalition was forced to modify the planned simultaneous attack from north and south. Special Operations forces from the CIA and US Army managed to build and lead the Kurdish Peshmerga into an effective force and assault for the North.

On March 20, 2003, at approximately 02:30 UTC or about 90 minutes after the lapse of the 48-hour deadline, at 05:33 local time, explosions were heard in Baghdad, signaling the beginning of the U.S.-led invasion. Beginning on 21 March 2003, U.S. forces launched Tomahawk missiles at selected Ansar al-Islam positions throughout the Sargat Valley. In preparation for the ground assault, nicknamed Operation Viking Hammer, American Lt. Col. Tovo divided his forces into six mixed peshmerga-Special Forces units. The peshmerga in two of these teams refused to contribute to the assault for various reasons including having lost too many personnel in previous fighting. The Peshmerga who did fight were once again armed with AK-47s, rocket-propelled grenades, and other assorted weapons.

Despite their well-armed adversaries, during the operation only 24 Peshmerga were killed in the fighting, compared the opposite body count of over 300.

=== Invasion and occupation of Iraq ===
The invasion of Iraq in 2003 saw a full military occupation of the country and the toppling of the Ba'athist regime and the installation of a temporary Coalition Provisional Authority (CPA) tasked with administering the country until the issuance of the new constitution as well as the establishment of the new Iraqi government following general elections. In 2004, UN Resolution 1546 stipulated the installation of an interim Iraqi government which succeeded the CPA. In 2005 following months of deliberation and discussions represented by different components of the Iraqi population, the new constitution was issued and voted into effect. The new Iraqi constitution recognized the Kurdistan Region as a “federal region” with its own government and parliament within the federal Republic of Iraq. The military occupation of Iraq ended in 2011.

=== Federal era ===
==== 2011–2012 tensions ====
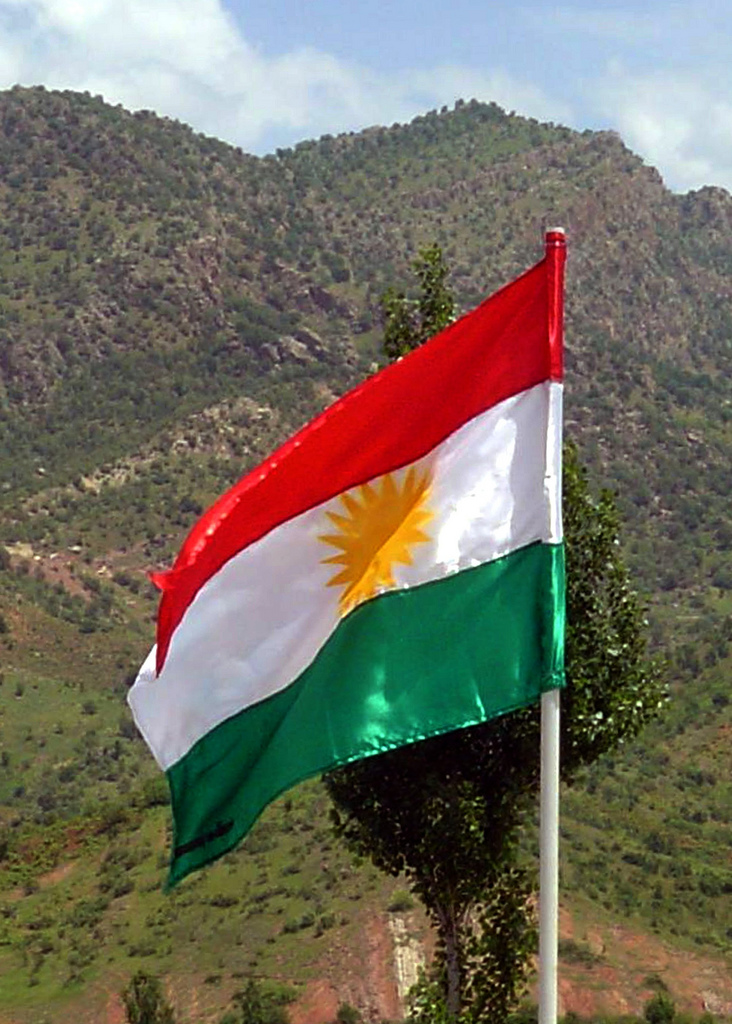
Kurdish flag in the Kurdistan Region

Following the withdrawal of occupational forces from Iraq, tensions between Iraqi Kurdistan and the central Iraqi government mounted through 2011–2012 on the issues of power sharing, oil and gas, and territorial control. In April 2012, the president of Iraq's semi-autonomous northern Kurdish region demanded that officials agree to their demands or face consequences of a secession from Baghdad by September 2012.

In September 2012, the Iraqi government ordered the Kurdistan Regional Government (KRG) to transfer its powers over Peshmerga to the central government and the relations strained further by the formation of a new command center (Tigris Operation Command) for Iraqi forces to operate in a disputed area over which both Baghdad and the Kurdistan Regional Government (KRG) claim jurisdiction.

On 16 November 2012, a military clash between the Iraqi forces and the Peshmerga resulted in one person killed. CNN reported that 2 people were killed (one of them an Iraqi soldier) and 10 wounded in clashes at the Tuz Khurmato town.

On the night of November 19, it was reported that clashes between security forces of the central Iraqi government and the KRG forces in Tigrit left 12 Iraqi soldiers and one civilian dead, according to Doğan news agency. The clash erupted when Iraqi soldiers attempted to enter northern Iraq; Peshmergas tried to prevent the Iraqi soldiers from entering the area upon Barzani's instructions. There was no confirmation of the event.

On November 25, it was reported that Iraqi Kurdistan sent reinforcements to a disputed area, where its troops are "involved in a standoff with the Iraqi army", despite calls on both sides for dialogue to calm the situation.

On December 11, Iraqi Kurdistan President Massoud Barzani, dressed in a military uniform, visited Kurdish-controlled areas of Kirkuk, a city long seen as a flashpoint for Arab-Kurdish tensions after the US military withdrawal in December 2011. Following Massoud Barzani's visit of Kurdish troops stationed in the disputed area near Kirkuk, Iraqi Prime Minister Maliki's party – The State of Law – issued a statement that "the visit of the President of Kurdistan Region Massoud Barzani and his son wearing a military helmet to inspect the battlefronts in Kirkuk province is a 'declaration of war' on all Iraqis not only Maliki, and even on President Jalal Talabani".

==== Kurdistan Region initiates oil exports to Turkey ====
In late 2013, the Kurdistan Regional Government announced that it had started independent oil exports to Turkey. This came after the Kurdistan Region Parliament enacted its own hydrocarbon law in 2007. The Iraqi central government voiced its disapproval at both actions, and vowed to take legal action after the KRG started exporting oil to Turkey without its consent. Iraq subsequently issued an international arbitration case against Turkey in May 2014, at the International Chamber of Commerce based in Paris.

==== 2014 Northern Iraq offensive ====
In 2014, Iraqi army units withdrew from large parts of northern Iraq in the face of attacks by the Islamic State in Iraq and the Levant. Peshmerga forces took control of Kirkuk and other Kurdish-populated areas outside the official territory of the KRG. Officials in Baghdad were angered by the sale of tankers worth of oil transported through the Kirkuk–Ceyhan Oil Pipeline.

In November 2016, Amnesty International reported that Kurdish authorities (namely Peshmerga and Asayish) had taken part in Kurdification (forced displacement of Arabs) in Kirkuk, namely by bulldozing homes and banishing the residents.

==== Failed Iraqi Kurdistan independence referendum, Peshmerga defeated in Kirkuk ====
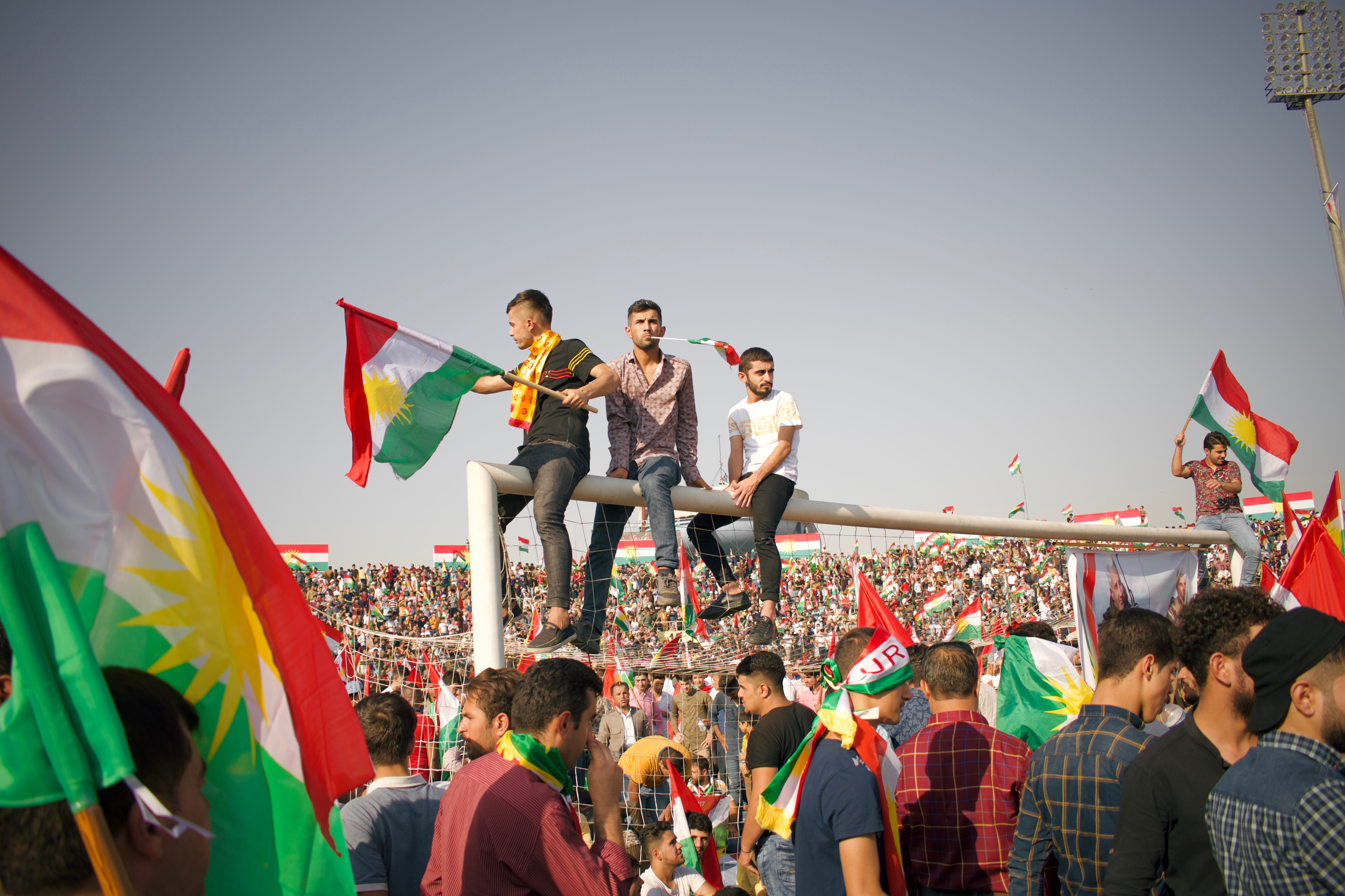
Pro-independence rally in Erbil in September 2017

Following the defeat of Islamic State in the Battle of Mosul, the former President of the Iraqi Kurdistan Region, Masoud Barzani, facilitated the 2017 Iraqi Kurdistan independence referendum.

Angered by the decision, the Prime Minister of Iraq, Haider al-Abadi, demanded the cancellation of the referendum and called on the KRG to initiate dialogue "in the framework of the constitution", ordered it to withdraw its forces from the disputed territories seized in 2014, and warned of a possible military retaliation.

Following the reluctance of the KRG to heed the warnings, in October 2017, Iraq began to move its forces into areas seized by the KRG in 2014, and all the disputed areas outside the Kurdish Region, including Kirkuk. In a successful military operation that lasted less than two weeks, the Iraqi Armed Forces defeated the Peshmerga and successfully reclaimed the area seized by the KRG, as well as later took control of the airports in Erbil and Sulaymaniyah. Masoud Barzani subsequently announced his resignation and the referendum was effectively abandoned.

==== Arabisation of disputed territories ====
Since October 2017, Kurdish news reports have made claims of Arabisation and forced demographic displacement of Kurds, most notably in Kirkuk, Tuz Khurmatu and Khanaqin. In June 2024, an Iraqi Kurdish source claimed that the Arabisation campaign of Kirkuk, under the administration of Arab governor Rakan al-Jubouri, surpassed even the level committed by the previous Ba'athist regime. On 6 August 2026, the director of the General Board for Kurdistani Areas Outside the Region, Fahmi Burhan claimed that after the 2024 nationwide census conducted by the Iraqi government, significant numbers of non-Kurds (most likely Arabs) have been settled in the city, further altering the demographic composition of Kirkuk. Burhan claimed that he was in possession of "statistical data on bringing and housing strangers in the city" which he did not want to show, instead he simply wanted to state that "Kirkuk has experienced a serious population increase after the 2024 census". On 12 August 2026, head of Kurdistan Democratic Party's Kirkuk office Hiwa Ahmed Mustafa claimed that more than 72,000 Arabs were settled in Kirkuk during the term of Arab governor Rakan al-Jubouri. He furthermore claimed that the province's "administrative balance" has been disrupted, as most administrative positions are held by Arabs. According to him, Iraqi security forces had also prevented Kurdish farmers from cultivating agricultural land.

==== Iraqi government reinstates control over oil in Kurdistan Region ====
In light of the Kurdistan Region initiating independent oil exports to Turkey in late 2013, on 23 May 2014, Iraq issued an international arbitration case against the latter at the International Chamber of Commerce based in Paris, regarding Turkey's role in the illegal sale of crude oil by the Kurdistan Regional Government through the Kirkuk-Ceyhan Oil Pipeline. Iraq claimed Turkey had breached provisions of the Iraq-Turkey Pipeline Agreement (ITPA 1973) by not heeding the instructions of the Iraqi Ministry of Oil. In February 2023, the International Court of Arbitration issued a verdict in favour of Iraq and on 25 March 2023, all oil exports from the Kurdistan Region were halted. Since then, the KRG has been officially rendered unable to resume the export of oil to Turkey without the permission of the Iraqi Ministry of Oil, as outlined in the ITP Agreement.

On 25 September 2025, the Iraqi federal government announced that it had reached a multilateral deal with the Kurdistan Regional Government and international oil companies (IOCs) operating in the KRI wherein precise technical guidelines and conditions of payment for crude oil production and transportation are set out. The deal is in line with the 2023-2025 Federal Budget Law approved by the Iraqi Council of Representatives.

Under the deal, the Federal Government will receive at least 230 000 barrels of oil produced in KRI and delivered directly to the Iraqi State Organization for Marketing of Oil (SOMO), which will in turn independently conduct the sale of these barrels through the Kirkuk–Ceyhan pipeline. Conditional on SOMO receiving at least 230 000 barrels daily, the Federal Ministry of Finance will in turn pay the KRG its annual share of the federal budget according to the Federal Budget Law. The IOCs on the other hand, will be reimbursed for production and transportation costs of the amount received by SOMO (US$14 per barrel) paid through an escrow account directly.

The deal stipulates that KRG and IOCs will be completely excluded from the export process, and won’t directly receive revenues from exports of oil barrels produced in KRI. Instead, the Iraqi government will allocate the revenues gained from independently exporting at least 230 000 barrels produced in the KRI to the central government budget, from which the KRG will receive its share proportional to its population, a mechanism identical to that used with other Iraqi oil-producing governorates, such as Basrah. Of the amount produced by the international oil companies –that is, at least 280 000 barrels– an amount no more than 50 000 barrels will be allocated for KRI domestic consumption. The IOCs will be allowed to sell this amount to domestic buyers and receive the revenues of this amount only.

The Iraqi Ministry of Oil reiterated its "firm commitment to managing oil resources in accordance with the principle of national sovereignty and the supreme interest of the state, in order to ensure a fair distribution of wealth among all the Iraqi people, in accordance with the constitution". The Iraqi minister of oil, Hayyan Abdul-Ghani stated that the deal guarantees that the Iraqi government controls all revenues of the country.

Since then, the Iraqi North Oil Company along with the North Gas Company, has had the exclusive authority to explore, manage and produce oil in Kirkuk and Kurdistan Region.

==== 2023 Unrest in Kirkuk ====
The 2023 unrest in Kirkuk was an incident which resulted in four Kurdish protesters being killed. The incident involved Arab, Kurdish and Turkmen residents of the city of Kirkuk. It began on 26 August 2023, after a building that used to be the headquarters of the Kurdistan Democratic Party (which was used at the time by the Iraqi Armed Forces as a Joint Operations Command) was about to be transferred back to the former following an order by the Prime Minister of Iraq. Two days later, on 28 August, Arab and Turkmen anti-KDP residents of Kirkuk staged a sit-in in front of the building to prevent its transfer as well as blocked the main road between Erbil and Kirkuk. In response, pro-KDP Kurds iniated counter-protests as well as demanded the opening of the blocked road. Iraqi security forces responded by opening fire on the Kurdish protesters. Following this, the government imposed a curfew in Kirkuk. The Supreme Court of Iraq subsequently issued a verdict halting the transfer of the building back to KDP, which was criticized by the latter.

==== Concerns about possible Kurdistan Region collapse ====
In September 2023, Al-Monitor published an article claiming that the Prime Minister of the KRG, Masrour Barzani, had sent a letter to the President of the United States urging him to mediate between Erbil and Baghdad on issues threatening the Kurdistan Region, stating: "I write to you now at another critical juncture in our history, one that I fear we may have difficulty overcoming. ...[W]e are bleeding economically and hemorrhaging politically. For the first time in my tenure as prime minister, I hold grave concerns that this dishonorable campaign against us may cause the collapse of ... the very model of a Federal Iraq that the United States sponsored in 2003 and purported to stand by since."

Yerevan Saeed, director of the 'Global Kurdish Initiative for Peace' at American University in Washington, expressed concerns in February 2024 about the future of the Kurdistan Region if problems persist. He stated that the combined effect of Baghdad's obstructive attitude towards the Kurdistan Region as well as intra-Kurdish problems will “inevitably result in the diminishment of the Kurdistan Region's political, legal, and economic influence, and could potentially lead to its dissolution."

==== 2023 Makhmour clashes ====
On 22 October 2023, clashes between Iraqi security forces and Peshmerga occurred in the town of Makhmour after it was handed over to the Iraqi forces following the withdrawal of the PKK. At around noon, both sides exchanged mortar fire for two hours until a ceasefire was announced. The clashes resulted in six deaths in total, including the 18th Peshmerga Infantry Brigade commander and his deputy. Both sides denied being the aggressor. The town of Makhmour is situated strategically between Mosul, Erbil and Kirkuk.

==== Growing state centralism ====
In March 2024, after a series of court rulings by the Supreme Court of Iraq targeting the Kurdistan Region, Abdul Rahman Zibari a Kurdish judge resigned in protest, describing the Court's actions as "a move towards centralization and a blatant violation of the constitutional rights of the Kurdistan Region". In his resignation statement, the judge hinted at concerns about Baghdad's departure from the principles of federalism, the political system adopted after the US-led invasion of Iraq. The Supreme Court subsequently announced that the resignation of Zibari will not hinder its work.

The KDP also announced that it will not participate in the upcoming regional parliamentary elections dated June 10, 2024, citing "unconstitutional rulings against the Kurdistan Region in the past four years" and labeling the actions of the Supreme Court as "a clear and dangerous violation of the constitution” and an attempt to “return Iraq to a centralized system."

== Casualties ==
[a]. Iraqi–Kurdish conflict (combined casualty figure until 2003; 163,800–345,100):

Mahmud Barzanji revolts (1919–1924) – unknown
Ahmed Barzani revolt (1931–1932) – hundreds killed
1943 Barzani revolt (1943–1945) – hundreds killed
First Iraqi–Kurdish War (1961–1970) – 12,000–105,000 killed.
Second Iraqi–Kurdish War (1974–1975) – 9,000 killed.
PUK insurgency (1976–1978) – 800 killed.
1980 Persecution of Feyli Kurds under Saddam Hussein - 25,000
Iraqi Kurdish uprising (1982–1988) – 50,000–198,000 killed.
Battle of Sulaymaniyah (1991) – 700–2,000 killed.
Iraqi Kurdish Civil War (1994–1997) – 3,000–5,000 killed
2003 invasion of Iraq (Operation Viking Hammer) – 300 Islamists killed, at least 24 Peshmerga killed; unknown number of Iraqi agents "eliminated".
2017 Iraqi-Kurdish conflict – 150 Iraqi forces (Army + PMU) killed (7 in Battle of Kirkuk per Kirkuk hospital), 105 Peshmerga killed, 200 wounded, 45 detained as well as 400 Kurdish civilians killed, 200 missing in Kirkuk (per Kurdish sources) and 183,000 displaced (per United Nations)
2023 unrest in Kirkuk – 4 Kurdish protesters killed, 16 injured, 40 detained
2023 Makhmour clashes – 2 Iraqi soldiers killed, 6 injured and 4 Peshmerga killed, 5 injured

== See also ==
- Kurdish–Turkish conflict
- Kurdish separatism in Iran
- Rojava conflict
- Azerbaijani–Kurdish conflict
- Legislative Council of the Autonomous Kurdistan Region
- A Modern History of the Kurds by David McDowall
