= National Defense Battalions (Iraq) =

National Defense Battalions كتائب الدفاع الوطني
- Active: 1961–2003
- Allegiance: Ba'athist Iraq
- Type: Paramilitary; Gendarmerie; Auxiliary force
- Role: Reserve army Counter-insurgency; Infantry scouts Light infantry Internal security
- Size: 250,000 (1987); 412,636 (1989); 100,000 (1991); 1,000 (2002)
- Part of: Northern Bureau
- Garrison/HQ: Erbil
- Engagements: Iraqi–Kurdish conflict; First Iraqi–Kurdish War; Second Iraqi–Kurdish War; Iran–Iraq War; 1991 Iraqi uprisings; Iraqi Kurdish Civil War; 2003 invasion of Iraq

Commanders
- Commander of the Northern Bureau: Ali Hassan al-Majid

The National Defense Battalions (Arabic: كتائب الدفاع الوطني; NDB) were an Iraqi Kurdish paramilitary and gendarmerie force. They were initially formed as a Kurdish pro-government militia used by Abdul-Karim Qasim during the First Iraqi–Kurdish War. However, under Saddam Hussein, the NDB grew exponentially in size and was incorporated into the government's security apparatus and played a prominent role in the Iran-Iraq War. Many of its members defected to the Peshmerga during the 1991 Iraqi uprisings. However, despite being weakened, the NDB survived until it was dissolved after the 2003 invasion of Iraq.

== Structure ==
The NDB was established as a militia during the First Iraqi–Kurdish War. Following the Ramadan Revolution, the Iraqi Ba'ath Party came to power and recruited various Kurdish tribal leaders, allowing them to form militias as long as their allegiance was to Iraq. These units were armed with light weapons and were tasked with policing Kurdish areas, as well as providing intelligence to the Iraqi Army.

During the Iran-Iraq War, the NDB was incorporated into the command of the Iraqi Directorate of Military Intelligence and the Iraqi Army's Northern Command. The Northern Bureau of the Ba'ath Party was responsible for operating and setting policies of the NDB, as well as reporting on its leaders political activities, arming the group, and maintaining control over the Kurdish conscripts.

The Northern Bureau portrayed the NDB as part of the Ba'athist plan of converting the Kurdish population from tribal peasants into ideal Iraqi citizens. A decree from Saddam Hussein required military-aged men from Iraqi Kurdistan to enlist in the NDB. In spite of official rhetoric, the NDB had been organised along tribal lines from the beginning, with Kurdish tribal leaders being responsible for both raising and maintaining the NDB. The official title of the Kurdish tribal leaders were that of a consultant, in an attempt to hide the extent of which the government interfered with the NDB, with leaders deemed corrupt, ineffective, or potentially disloyal, either being replaced by other leaders within their tribes or being forced to disband their units. Others, who chose to rebel, or defect, were executed. One battalion was disbanded because its leader was claiming he controlled 900 soldiers, when in fact he only had 90. Two other battalions were disbanded, and their leaders executed, because one had failed to fight against the Iranian Army, while the other had attempted to assassinate the commander of the 5th Army Corps. Meanwhile, the leader of the 24th Battalion was executed after rebelling.

In predominantly Kurdish areas, NDB commanders were under the jurisdiction of the local Ba'ath Party branch, with battalions being attached to the party offices in Ninewah, Ta'mim, Arbil, Sulaymaniyah, and Dohuk. The management of training camps, education sessions, the pursuit and capture of deserters, and the surveillance of NDB leaders and soldiers, were central to the security operations of the Northern Bureau. By 1987, there were 147 battalions, composing around 250,000 men, which made up nearly 10% of the total Kurdish population under the control of the Northern Bureau. Although 5 battalions were disbanded in 1987, the force had grown to 321 battalions in August 1989, made up of 412,636 soldiers. This increase was largely due to the forcible conscription of Kurds at the end of the Anfal campaign. The NDB was not limited to Iraqi Kurdistan, and some battalions even fought in the Siege of Basra in 1987.

In addition to their counterinsurgency role, the NDB were also seen as a means by which the government could absorb young Kurds, provide them with employment, and prevent or dissuade them from joining the separatists. The government achieved only limited success however, with the NDB suffering high desertion rates. It was quite typical for men to continually shift between fighting in the insurgency and fighting in the NDB. Both choices were risky, as separatists had their family members deported or imprisoned, while those in the NDB were disowned by Kurdish society. Desertion was dangerous, with execution squads being common on the frontlines.

Following the Gulf War, and the 1991 Iraqi uprisings, the NDB was remodelled. The NDB survived in a much weaker capacity until being officially disbanded after the 2003 invasion of Iraq, but by 2002 there was only 1 battalion comprising around 1,000 men.

== Legacy ==
The NDB was considered jash (Kurdish term for collaborator or traitor). The NDB, due to their prominence in the Anfal campaign, have been a subject of controversy in Iraqi Kurdistan. During the 1990s, discussion of the Jash remained very much a taboo subject, however this changed following the PUK–KDP peace agreement, as well as the 2006–2007 Tribunal, with the Kurdish press opening up discussion on the subject. Views on the jash remain divided. Some Kurds are more merciful to the jash, claiming that some may have been victims of bad circumstances, or forced into the NDB to protect themselves.

== See also ==
- Republican Guard
- Popular Army
