= PUK insurgency =

1975-1979 insurgency in Iraq

- Part of the Iraqi–Kurdish conflict
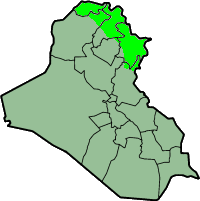
| Date | 1975–1979 |
| Location | Iraqi Kurdistan (nominally northern Iraq) |
| Result | Long-term Iraqi strategic victory: PUK military failure; KDP tactical failure; Kurdish rebels failed to defeat the Iraqi government; Eventual 1983–1986 Kurdish rebellions in Iraq |

Belligerents
| Ba'athist Iraq | PUK | KDP |

Commanders and leaders
| Saddam Hussein | Jalal Talabani; Nawshirwan Mustafa; Ali Askari † | Mustafa Barzani; Massoud Barzani; Mahmoud Ezidi † |

Strength
| Unknown | 800 | 7,500 |

Casualties and losses
| Unknown | 700 killed | Unknown |

The PUK insurgency was a low-level rebellion of the Patriotic Union of Kurdistan (PUK) against Baathist Iraq from 1975 to 1979, following the defeat of the Kurdistan Democratic Party (KDP) in the Second Iraqi–Kurdish War, which forced that organization to declare a ceasefire and move into exile in Iran. Due to lack of foreign support, the PUK guerrillas were only able to operate in the most remote parts of the mountains of Iraqi Kurdistan. During this period, the PUK plunged into a political crisis with the KDP, which led to heavy intra-Kurdish warfare, climaxing in 1977. After the insurgency, the PUK entered into an alliance with Iranian forces during the Iran–Iraq War, and were backed by Iran in the Kurdish rebellion of 1983.

== Background ==
Autonomy in Iraqi Kurdistan was originally charted in 1970 as the Kurdish Autonomous Region following the agreement of an Autonomy Accord between the government of Iraq and leaders of the Iraqi Kurdish community. A Legislative Assembly was established in the city of Arbil with theoretical authority over the Kurdish-populated governorates of Erbil, Dahuk and As Sulaymaniyah. The autonomy plan however collapsed over a dispute over the oil rich town of Kirkuk, resulting in the 1974–1975 Second Iraqi–Kurdish War.

After the 1975 Algiers Agreement, when the KDP lost Iranian support, the KDP was defeated and forced to move into exile by March 1975, while the Iraqi military re-asserted control over all of Northern Iraq. As a result, the PUK was formed in July 1975 in Damascus, Syria, by a branch of former KDP operatives, led by Jalal Talabani.

== Timeline ==
=== Beginning of the insurgency ===
PUK forces began engaging with Iraqi military in late 1975, right in the aftermath of the Second Iraqi–Kurdish War, and continued through 1976. Those raids by the PUK against Iraqi government were not favorably considered by Mustafa Barzani, the leader of the KDP.

=== Intra-Kurdish fighting ===
In the aftermath of the Second Iraqi–Kurdish War, KDP groups ambushed and killed PUK fighters on several occasions in 1976–1977. Minor intra-Kurdish clashes between the PUK and the KDP took place in July 1976, January 1977 and February 1977. Talabani vowed revenge, and at various moments ordered his troops to fire upon any KDP troops – but suffered from operational weaknesses compared to the KDP.

Upon Talabani's return to Iraq in 1977 from his exile in Damascus, he organized the PUK into peshmerga troops, setting his headquarters in Nawkan (Iranian Kurdistan) and Kandil (South Kurdistan). The first intense KDP–PUK fighting occurred in Bradost area in April 1978, when Ali Askari's force of 800 PUK fighters was attacked by KDP Peshmerga, led by Sami Abd al-Rahman, in which Ali Askari was captured and executed. Askari's inferior force was overwhelmed by 7,500 KDP troops. Askari’s peshmerga also suffered from numerous attacks from Iraqi and Iranian air attacks prior to engaging Abd al Rahman’s peshmerga. and some 700 were killed. This defeat caused many PUK members to abandon it in search of a stronger and more effective leadership.

Feuding and splitting continued throughout the late 1970s, as the KDP, PUK, and KDP-I jostled for influence and funding from neighboring states.

== Aftermath ==
The PUK and KDP jointly sided Iran in the Iran–Iraq War, which erupted in 1980. Through the warfare between Iran and Iraq Kurdish rebellion took place in north Iraq, initiated by both PUK and KDP. With backing of Iranian forces the rebels managed to gain control of several parts of Kurdsitan, however after the cease-fire between Iran and Iraq came into effect, the Kurdish rebels were crushed by the Al-Anfal campaign.

== See also ==
- List of modern conflicts in the Middle East
