= Mama Risha =

Kurdish guerilla (1957–1985)

Najmadin Shukr Rauf
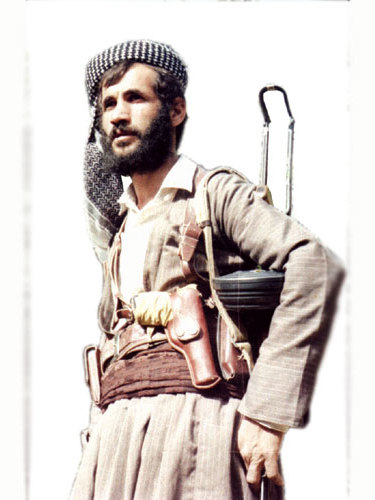
- Born: July 1, 1957; Talaban, near Kirkuk, Kingdom of Iraq
- Died: January 25, 1985 (aged 27); Kirkuk Governorate, Ba'athist Iraq
- Military career
- Conflicts: Israeli-Palestinian conflict (1972-1977); Yom Kippur War (WIA); Iraqi-Kurdish conflict

Najmadin Shukr Rauf Zangana (Kurdish:نەجمەدین شکور ڕەئوف زەنگەنە), known by his nom-de-guerre as "Mama Risha" (Kurdish: مامه‌ ڕیشه‌, lit. 'Bearded Uncle'), July 1, 1957 – January 25, 1985), was a Kurdish guerilla fighter and member of the Patriotic Union of Kurdistan (PUK). He was the commander of the Garmiyan battalion in Kirkuk, Laylan, and Hamrin areas. He was known for organising ambushes and raids against the Iraqi military.

== Life ==
He was born in the village of Talaban near Kirkuk into a poor Sunni Kurdish family from the town of Chamchamal. Risha was born in a village belonging to the Cebari tribe. He was described as illiterate and a nuejker (Central Kurdish: someone who is meticulous about Islamic prayer). As a teenager, his village was raided by the Iraqi military. Angered by what he witnessed during the raid, he would go on to join the PUK, quickly gaining a reputation as a fearless fighter. Later, as commander of the Garmiyan battalion, he was celebrated for his military prowess due to how he would organise ambushes and raids on Iraqi military columns.

According to Kurdish sources, in 1972 he travelled to Syria and spent 5 years initially fighting as a volunteer for the Palestine Liberation Organization (PLO) in western Syria and southern Lebanon. In 1973 (during the Yom Kippur War), he fought in the Golan Heights in Syria alongside Palestinian groups against Israel during which he was wounded, and was treated in a Syrian hospital. The failure of the Kurdish autonomy agreement with the Iraqi government and the initiation of the Arabization policy by the Baath Party in the Kurdish regions of Kirkuk and Khanaqin ultimately led to the outbreak of the Second Iraqi–Kurdish War in 1975. Barzani's defeat in this war led to the founding of the Patriotic Union of Kurdistan (PUK), which Risha joined.

=== Death ===
Shorof, during the 2018 interview, explained how Najmadin had died in an ambush following a skirmish with Iraqi soldiers near Laylan, Kirkuk Governorate. Shorof recounted that as Najmadin was returning from the skirmish, a Kurdish jash working with the Iraqi government invited him to the spy's house. Unsuspecting, and believing the friendship offered by his fellow countryman was sincere, he entered the house and was ambushed and gunned down by a machine gun.

== Legacy ==
Risha became a symbol of the indomitable and legendary fighter among Kurds in the war against the Iraqi government through his successes as a troop leader and military skills. In contemporary Kurdish society, calling someone a "Mama Risha" is a term of praise, used to describe a person who is respected, honorable, and trustworthy.

According to some sources, he chose the nickname "Mama Risha" (meaning bearded uncle) because he swore that he would never shave his beard until Kurdistan was fully free from the Ba'athist Iraqi government's control. He was also nicknamed "The Iron Man" and "Lion of Kirkuk" by his fellow guerrilla fighters due to his conduct during battles with Iraqi forces in the Kirkuk region.

In a 2018 interview with his brother, Shorof, and Najmadin's widow, Nishtiman, they spoke about their memories with Najmadin. Nishtiman said that him that he had "loved swimming, games of all types and physical exercise." When asked of his other interests, she replied with a smile "He was totally focussed on defeating Saddam, of defending his brothers and sisters, and how he could gain independence and freedom for his country."

== See also ==
- Peshmerga
- Patriotic Union of Kurdistan
- Iran–Iraq War
