= 1983–1986 Kurdish rebellions in Iraq =

Anti-Saddam Hussein revolts of the Iran–Iraq War

- Part of the Iraqi–Kurdish conflict and the Iran–Iraq War
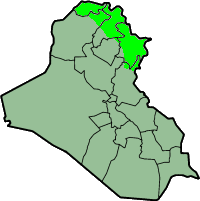
- Kurdish controlled area of Iraq
Date	September 1983 – 1986
Location	Northern Iraq
Result	Short-term military stalemate: Start of the Al-Anfal campaign in 1988 against the Kurds and defeat of the Kurdish rebellion; Kurdish KDP, PUK, and Mujahideen temporarily hold major enclaves in North Iraq; Long term Kurdish tactical failure

Belligerents
KDP; Supported by: Iran PUK Kurdish mujahideen	Iraq

Commanders and leaders
Massoud Barzani Jalal Talabani; Mama Risha † Ali Abdulaziz Halabji	(Iraq) Saddam Hussein (Iraq) Ali Hassan al-Majid

The 1983–1986 Kurdish rebellions in Iraq occurred during the Iran–Iraq War as PUK and KDP Kurdish militias of Iraqi Kurdistan rebelled against Saddam Hussein as part of the Iraqi–Kurdish conflict, in an attempt to form an independent state. With Iraqi government forces occupied by the Iran-Iraq War, Kurdish Peshmerga (combining the forces of the KDP and PUK) succeeded in taking control of some enclaves, with Iranian logistic and sometimes military support. The initial rebellion resulted in stalemate by 1985.

The most violent phase of the conflict between the Kurds and Iraqi Ba'athist regime was the Al-Anfal Campaign of the Iraqi Army against the Kurdish minority, which took place in 1988 and included the Halabja chemical attack. The Al-Anfal campaign ended with an agreement of amnesty between the two belligerents. No permanent gains were made by the Kurds.

== Background ==
=== The Kurdish people of Iraq ===
Iraqi Kurdistan is located in northern Iraq, along its borders with Syria, Turkey, and Iran. It is a mostly mountainous and fertile region. Towards the north, along the Iranian border, is the periphery of the Iranian Zagros Mountains. The Kurds have lived in this region for thousands of years, but never as part of a Kurdish ethno-state. Instead, different empires and modern states have controlled this region.

The Kurds identify themselves as Kurdish through the language they speak, their customs, religion (mainly Sunni Muslim, but with Shia, Alevi and Yazidi minorities), tolerance of other religions, and their tribal affiliation. Tribes are determined through kinship and territorial location. For Kurds, identification with the tribe is more important and significant than the official country the tribe is located in. Since the 1920s, the Kurds have harbored grievances against the various Iraqi governments due to a lack of representation in state institutions.

=== Kurdistan Democratic Party ===
The Kurdistan Democratic Party, KDP, is the longest standing and preeminent political party of the Kurdish people. It was created in 1946 under Mulla Mustafa Barzani with initial goals based on Kurdish nationalist aspirations and the desire for self-government. Over time, Barzani and his supporters evolved the mission of the KDP into a fight for "the full rights of the Kurds for self-determination ... achieved through peaceful means in a democratic, pluralist, and federal Iraq." Barzani was the first person to assemble almost universal Kurdish nationalism among the people and from the mid-1930s through to his expulsion from Iraq in the 1970s he was synonymous with the Kurdish quest for independence. Barzani led rebellions intermittently against the governments of Iraq (First and Second Iraqi–Kurdish Wars), Iran, and Turkey, in hopes of gaining larger revolutionary forces each time.

=== Patriotic Union of Kurdistan ===
The Patriotic Union of Kurdistan, PUK, was established in 1975 under Jalal Talabani. Talabani had worked as a Kurdish revolutionary in the KDP and grew his name and reputation by speaking out against Barzani. In 1975 Talabani and his followers split from the KDP and started a new, more liberal party. In essence the PUK is run on the same platform as the KDP, lobbying for "autonomy for Kurdistan, democracy for Iraq". The PUK defines itself apart from the KDP by drawing its supporters from central and southern Kurdistan. The PUK has come to represent a more urban, intellectual, and politically forward group of people, versus the traditional rhetoric of the KDP. Supporters of each party are able to distinguish themselves personally by tribal alliance, personal differences, and ideological disagreement.

=== The Iraqi Ba'athist Government ===
The KDP and PUK, although separate political parties, fought the same opponent, the government of Iraq under the leadership of Saddam Hussein. Since the beginning of the Ba'ath rule in Iraq there have been issues between the leaders of the Ba'ath and the Kurdish people. Intermittent negotiations occurred between the two groups to discuss party platforms and to try to come to a consensus on representation; however the Ba'ath were exceptionally distrustful of the Kurds and harbored suspicions against the KDP, especially of leader Barzani. In contrast, a natural alliance was drawn between the Ba'ath and political party PUK. Both were leftist organizations that advocated a Kurd-Arab alliance.

=== Window of opportunity ===
By the late 1970s, Masud Barzani had already established a force of 5,000 men in North Iraq (by 1979), and his forces engaged the PDKI during 1979 Kurdish rebellion in Iran, true to their alliance with Iran.

In September 1980, Iraq engaged in warfare with Iran over the Shatt al-Arab and rather than a quick victory the war had degenerated into a very long drawn out stalemate. The Kurds saw this as the prime opportunity to take control of the Kurdish areas, while the Iraqi government was preoccupied and weakened. The goal was to create a new bargaining platform and push Iraqi governmental forces out of Kurdistan. Since the beginning of the warfare, the KDP under Barazanis established a solid alliance with the Iranians, while the PUK - a leftist organization, kept its distance from the newly created conservative Islamic Republic of Iran, receiving logistic support from Baathist Syria and from Libya.

== Chronology ==
=== War tactics ===
A wide variety of war tactics were used in this conflict, everything from the most simple hit and run to advanced chemical warfare. This conflict is a good case to look at how asymmetrical capabilities influence battle.

==== Kurdish tactics ====
To combat the Ba'ath the Kurd's strategy involved the use of guerrilla warfare and armed with light weapons either stolen from the Iraqi troops or given to them by the Iranians. The peshmerga worked with the locals to build up defenses and teach defensive tactics to the local militia in hopes of educating the mass public and protect them against future attack and seizure by the Ba'ath army. Furthermore, the peshmerga supplied the villages with a local government and services (education, medicine, security).

The mountains in northern Kurdistan proved to be an excellent place to hide and camp out. The mountain region was also very difficult for the Iraqi army to traverse on foot and by air. The guerrilla style war tactics of the Kurds proved very beneficial when fighting in this region. In contrast to the helpful assistance of the northern region, the southern flatlands of Kurdistan worked against the Kurdish insurgency. The Iraqis were able to easily bomb the major cities of the southern region and the fertile valley. Kurdish guerrilla tactics of hit and run did not prove to be successful against the firepower of the Iraqis during aerial bombardment and shelling.

==== Iraqi tactics ====
The Iraq army used full-scale military tactics in combating the Kurdish insurgency. In the heavily populated agricultural areas daily air raids destroyed towns, crops, and people. The army used its superior military power of more men, guns, and artillery to combat the insurgents. In order to inflict the greatest destruction, the Iraqi army divided Southern Kurdistan into a grid pattern, dividing the most densely populated cities and farming areas into sections. The grid facilitated a mechanized detonation of heavy artillery in predetermined areas by fighter planes and inflicted the greatest destruction possible. The Kurds had no knowledge of the oncoming attack or ways to protect themselves from the shelling. This was very structured and assigned per Iraqi army goals. The shelling and bombing per grid was very successful in driving mass fear among the Kurds.

== Aftermath ==
=== Al-Anfal Campaign ===
Beyond using traditional warfare techniques the Ba'ath engaged in the use of chemical weapons against the Kurds during the al-Anfal campaign of 1988. A total onslaught began against the Kurdish people that eventually killed tens of thousands of Kurds and displaced at least one million of the Kurdish population to Iran and Turkey. Ali Hassan al-Majid, nicknamed "Chemical Ali," led the three step process of "village collectivization": the destruction of hundreds of Kurdish villages and the relocation of their residents to concentration camps, mujamma'at. This campaign was the first documented use of lethal chemical weapons by a government against its own civilians. The process of village collectivization violated widespread human rights and is an example of systematic genocide that went unchecked by the global community.

Al-Majid and his commanding officers warned if the Peshmerga did not lay down their arms and allow the cleansing program to continue peacefully the army would stop the Peshmerga with chemical weapons. Although Iraq had signed the 1925 Geneva Protocol outlawing the use of chemical and biological weapons, its application was restricted to only nationals of an enemy state signatory to the Protocol in international armed conflicts. Al-Majid began ordering the army to proceed with the deployment of shells carrying the deadly weapons, the first time a government used chemical weapons against its own civilian population.

==== Halabja poison gas attack ====
The most famous attack of chemical warfare by the Iraqi army against the Kurds was the attack on the town of Halabja on March 16, 1988. Over 4,000 Kurds were killed in this one attack by the combination of mustard gas and hydrogen cyanide. Between 7,000 and 10,000 civilians were injured and thousands more died of complications, diseases, etc. stemming from the release of chemical gas. The town was attacked because Kurdish guerrillas had allied with Tehran and the city was now under Iranian control. Conventional artillery, mortars, and rockets bombed Halabja for two days before the chemical attack; the use of chemical weapons was done for good measure to assure no survivors were possible. This attack is considered separate from the al-Anfal campaign and was one of the last attacks by the Iraqis during the Iran–Iraq War. This act has also been declared an act of genocide against the Kurdish people of Iraq.

=== End of hostilities ===
The rebellion by the PUK and KDP was officially declared over by the Iraqi government on September 6, 1988 when a decree of amnesty for all Iraqi Kurds was read aloud on the radio. The announcement came as a surprise to the Kurdish population. The decree was declared most likely because Baghdad believed the peshmerga had finally been defeated. The government pardoned the insurgents, but refused to let the Kurds return to their previous relatively free lives.

The Ba'ath instituted draconian measures on all surviving towns and cities in Kurdistan. The government feared a resurgence of the insurgent peshmerga group, draconian measures prevented a revival. Furthermore, any man suspected having ties with the peshmerga insurgency were round up and relocated to camps in the southern deserts. The men taken to these deserts were tortured on a daily basis and murdered in mass quantities. It is believed these efforts to weed out any remaining insurgents lasted through 1989 with an additional 300,000 people relocated from various villages to "more modern villages with better facilities." Secure zones, or cluster camps, were created along the Iranian border as well as outside the cities of Erbil, Mosul, and Suleimaniyeh.

=== Post Iran–Iraq War ===
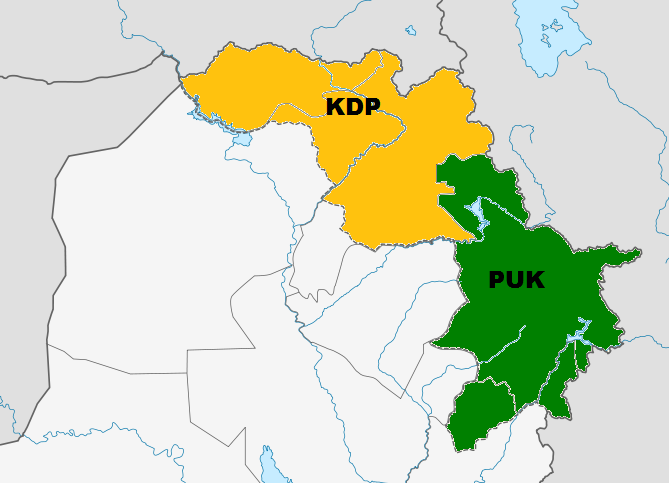
KDP and PUK controlled areas of Kurdistan

The decree of amnesty did not bring any gains for the Kurdish front nor did it redistribute Kurdish powers or representation in the Iraqi government. After al-Anfal and the post-rebellion oppression the Kurds did not engage in further resistance, instead the leaders tried more diplomatic means to engage the Ba'ath in coming to a consensus on the status of Iraqi Kurdistan. No progress was made in the diplomatic realm either. Inter-factional issues between the KDP and PUK were continually on the rise and prevented any progress in Kurdish autonomy. These internal issues degenerated into civil war in the 1990s, after the KDP and PUK took control of part of northern Iraq following the Gulf War (see Iraqi Kurdish Civil War).

=== Recognition of Kurdish autonomy ===
With the overthrow of the Ba'ath government by the United States in 2003 the Kurds have increased diplomatic means to seek further gains towards legitimacy. The United States and Kurdish parties disagree over the ethnic alignment of the regional government, and this disagreement continues to stall any concrete gains from occurring. The United States believes a non-ethnically defined government is best for the region so that the collective majority can broker an identity and connect both politically and as a society. However the Kurds do not agree with this concept, as they prefer a regional government explicitly built on the Kurdish identity. This is a step in the direction of autonomy and a method for the Kurdish population to showcase their abilities in governing themselves and generating a productive self-sufficient economy. Time will tell if these new negotiations and concepts will bear success for the Iraqi Kurdish plight. Massoud Barzani has been elected president of Iraqi Kurdistan and Jalal Talabani has been elected president of the new Iraqi democratic government.

== Impact: refugee and death statistics ==
- Refugees: At least 1 Million people fled (almost 30% of the population) to Iran, Turkey and Pakistan
  - Since 1971, at least 370,000 have sought refugee in Iran, over 10% of the Iraqi Kurdistan population
- Al-Anfal Campaign
  - 50,000 to 100,000 were killed, including women and children
  - 90% of targeted Kurdish villages were destroyed, this is approximately 4,000 villages
- Halabja poison gas attack
  - 3,000–5,000 killed
  - 7,000 to over 10,000 injured
  - At least 50,000 Kurds escaped into Iran after this one attack

These numbers were collected by Human Rights Watch.

== Role of Iran ==
Iran covertly aided the Iraqi Kurds against the Iraqis with weapons, food supplies, and intelligence in exchange for intelligence on Iraq movements and assistance along the northern Iran–Iraq border.

In addition, Iran was an ally of Masud Barzani's and aided the KDP with arms and training of peshmerga forces and leaders. In exchange for arms and education the Iranians received intelligence on Iraqi military information and Kurdish assistance in fighting the Iraqi army. The Iranians had an invested interest in assisting the Kurds. The constant siege by the Kurds preoccupied the Ba'ath and prevented the army from devoting entire resources to conquering the Iranians. The Iranians supported the Kurds just to the point where they were powerful enough to fight against the Iraqis, but not strong enough to overcome the Iraqi army.

== See also ==
- First Iraqi–Kurdish War
- Iraqi–Kurdish conflict
- List of wars involving Iraq
- List of conflicts in the Middle East
- A Modern History of the Kurds by David McDowall

== Literature ==
- Ghareeb, Edmond. The Kurdish Question in Iraq, Syracuse: Syracuse University Press, 1981.
- Gunter, Michael M. "The KDP-PUK Conflict in Northern Iraq." Middle East Journal 50.2 (1996)
- Gunter, Michael M. The Kurds of Iraq: Tragedy and Hope. New York: St. Martin's Press, New York, 1992.
- McDowall, David. The Kurds: A Nation Denied. London: Minority Rights Group, 1992.
- O'Ballance, Edgar. The Kurdish Struggle, 1920–1994. New York: St. Martin's Press, Inc (1996).
- Romano, David. Kurdish Nationalist Movement Opportunity, Mobilization, and Identity. Cambridge: Cambridge University, 2006.
