= Margaret George Shello =

Assyrian guerrilla and Peshmerga military commander (1942–1969)

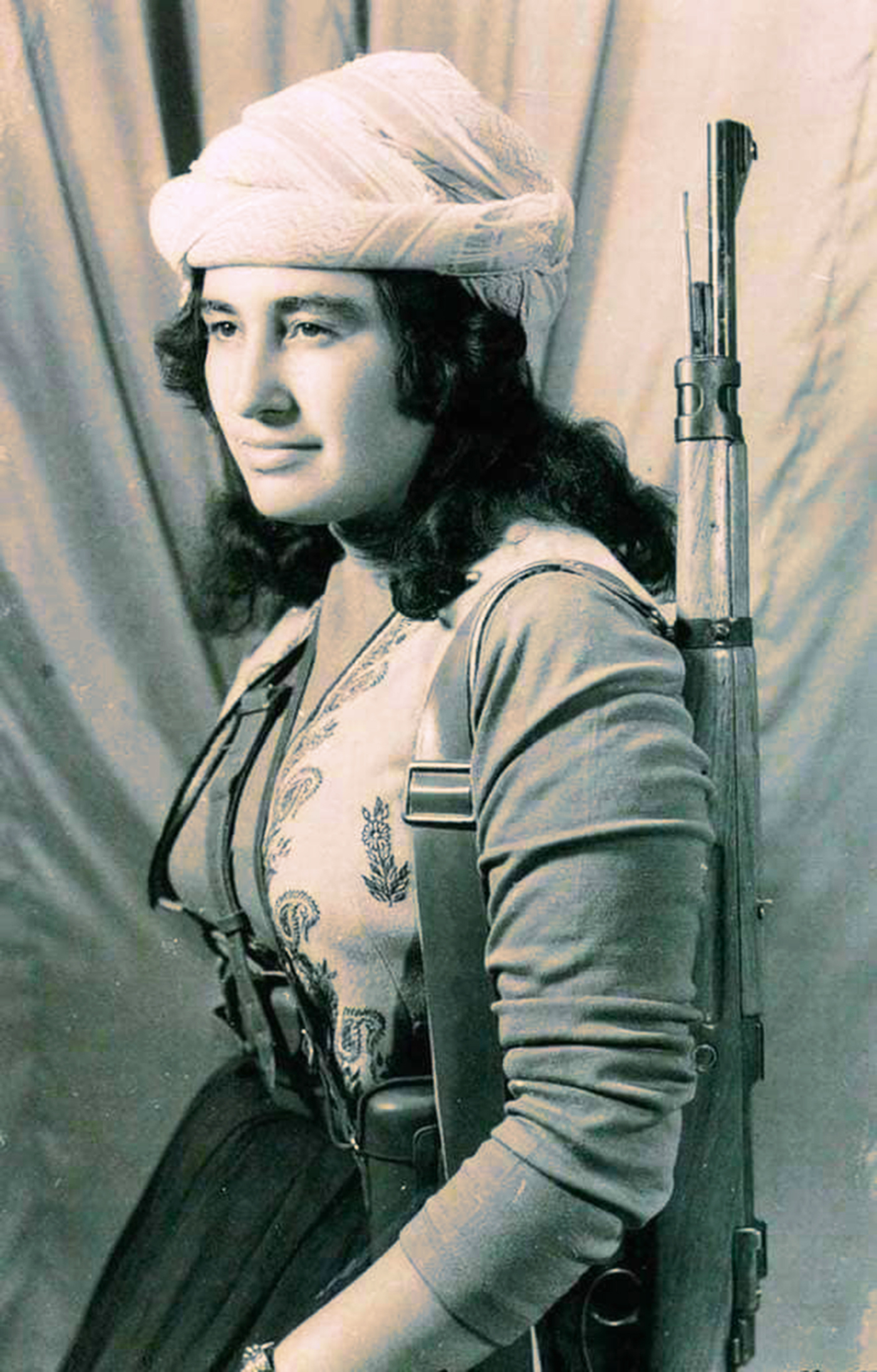
- Portrait photograph of Margaret George Shello
- Native name: ܡܪܓܪܝܬ ܓܝܘܪܓܝܣ ܫܠܘ
- Nickname: Joan of Arc of Kurdistan
- Born: 21 January 1942 (Note: Shello's grave gives her date of birth as 21 January 1942 and her date of death as 26 December 1969. Other sources vary. Some suggest April 1942, or c. 1940, claiming she joined the Peshmerga in 1960 at age 20. Sources also differ on her death date, with some citing 1966.)
- Died: 26 December 1969 (aged 27)
- Allegiance: Kurdistan Democratic Party
- Branch: Peshmerga
- Rank: Commander
- Known for: First female Peshmerga fighter and Battle of Zawita Valley
- Conflicts: Iraqi–Kurdish conflict; First Iraqi–Kurdish War; Battle of Zawita Valley; Battle of Lomana

Margaret George Shello (Syriac: ܡܪܓܪܝܬ ܓܝܘܪܓܝܣ ܫܠܘ Margaret Giwargis d-Gilu; 21 January 1942 – 26 December 1969), (Kurdish: مارگێرێت جورج شێلو) also known as Margaret George Malik or just Margaret George, (Note: The name used varies between sources: Margaret George Shello, Margaret George Malik, Margaret George.) was a famous Assyrian guerilla fighter and commander of the Kurdish Peshmerga forces during the First Iraqi–Kurdish War. Originally a hospital worker, Shello joined the Peshmerga at the age of 20 in 1963 after her village was attacked by a pro-Iraqi government militia. She was the first female Peshmerga fighter and attracted considerable renown both in Iraq and internationally as the female leader of an all-male unit. In Western Europe, she became known as the "Joan of Arc of the Kurdish Revolution".

After leading her unit successfully in several battles, Shello was killed in unclear circumstances in 1969. Several contradictory accounts have been presented by different groups concerning the manner of her death. Many accounts place the blame on the Kurds, variously claiming that Shello was killed for demanding a higher leadership position, for championing the Assyrian cause as well. Others have blamed her death on assassination either by a rival Kurdish group or by the Iraqi government. She remains one of the most famous Peshmerga commanders and is revered by both Kurds and Assyrians as a freedom fighter, a symbol of bravery and an icon.

== Background ==
The Assyrians are an ethnic and Christian religious minority in the Middle East, concentrated mainly in their homeland in northern Iraq. They to a large extent inhabit the same lands as the largest minority group in the region, the Kurds, with whom they for most of their history have coexisted with peacefully. Since 1843, relations between Assyrians and Kurds have often been hostile, motivated by repeated atrocities against the Assyrians in which Kurds took part as well as the independence movements of both groups harming the movements of the other since proposed self-governing territories often overlapped. Under the various Iraqi regimes since the country's independence from the United Kingdom in 1932, the Iraqi government enacted policies and measures to curb both the Kurdish and Assyrian cultures, including not only cultural efforts but also massacres and destructions of villages.

At the time of Margaret George Shello in the 1960s, there were broadly speaking two major camps among the Assyrians; those who lived in towns and cities and tended to identify with the Iraqi government and those who lived in the country-side and sided more with the Kurdish efforts to establish an independent Kurdistan. Many Assyrians, particularly in the mountainous regions in the northeast, were drawn to the Kurds because of their struggle for autonomy and their fight against the Iraqi government; they were not necessarily in support of a greater Kurdistan which also included their lands. Whether the Assyrians fought for the Kurds or alongside them for their own goal is still a matter of dispute. In any case, Assyrian contribution to the movement was immense. Assyrian leaders were invited to meetings of the Kurdistan Democratic Party (KDP) and many waged war alongside the Kurdish Peshmerga militia, sometimes in their own battalions, manned and led by Assyrians.

== Biography ==
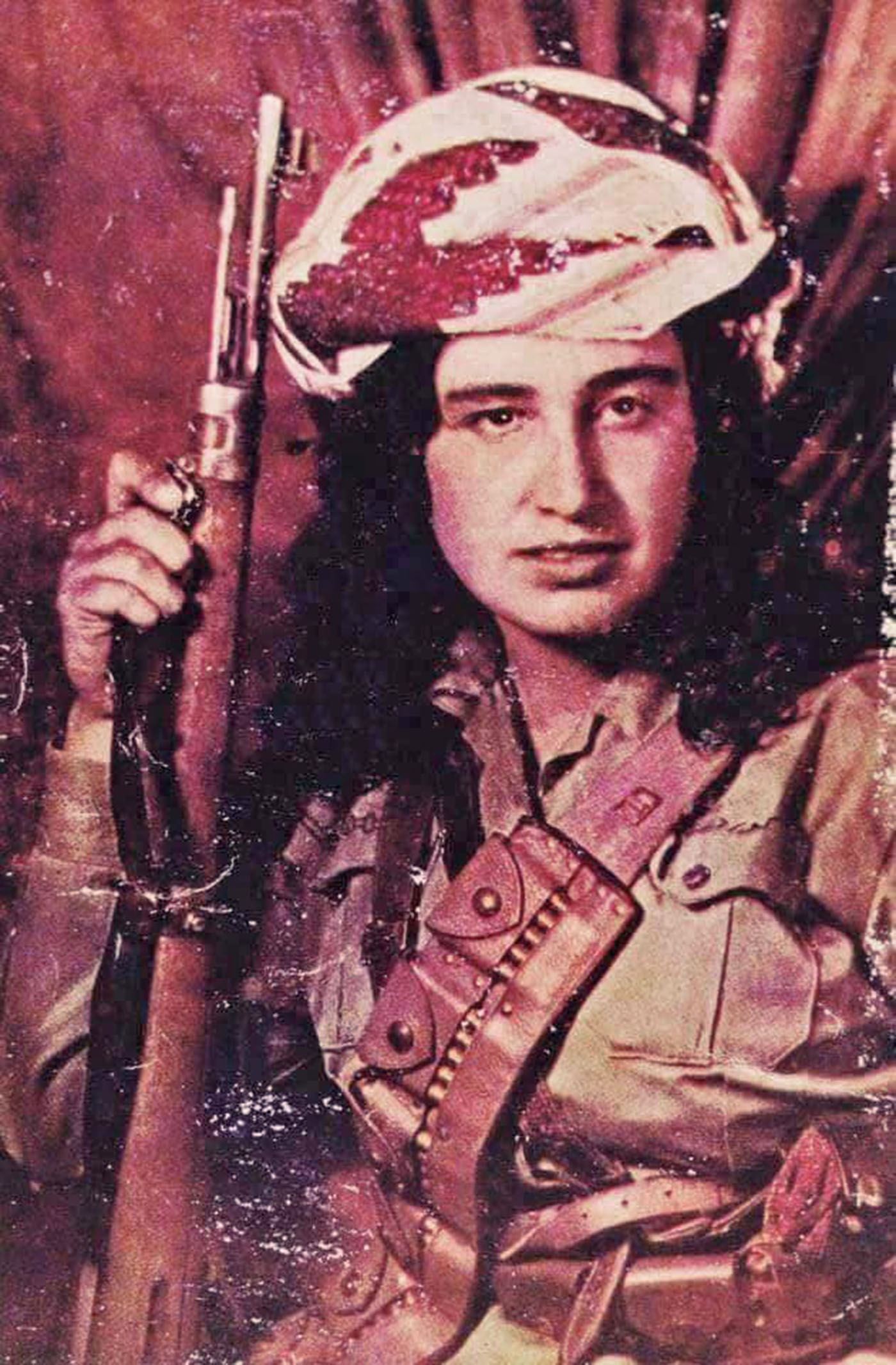
Another portrait photograph

Margaret George Shello was a Christian Assyrian woman, born on 21 January 1942 in the village Dūra, located in the mountainous Barwari region in the Duhok Governorate. Shello had a sister (Rosa) and a brother. (Note: Shello's living family members left Iraqi Kurdistan in 1964 and moved to Mosul. In the mid-1970s, they fled Iraq altogether, moving to the United States.) Her father was recruited to the Kurdish cause in 1961 by Mustafa Barzani. Shello's father at some point attempted to marry her to one of his business partners but she did not approve of the marriage and refused to live with her "husband".

=== Peshmerga ===
Originally a hospital worker, Shello joined the Peshmerga at the age of 20 in 1963 (Note: She is alternatively contradictingly often said to have joined in 1960 (also at the age of 20).) after her village was attacked by a pro-government militia (jash). Initially continuing to work with medical tasks, she quickly rose to become a military leader. Shello was the first female Peshmerga fighter and attracted renown as the female leader of an all-male unit, based somewhere in the vicinity of Akre. In contrast to the Muslim Kurdish women, who were not allowed to fight, Shello's right to fight, despite her gender, was secured through her Christian faith and her family members already being involved in the movement.

Shello's fame was further increased after she killed a prominent jash leader. She fought in the First Iraqi–Kurdish War, leading her forces into battle several times, notably commanding the Peshmerga forces to great success at the Battle of the Zawita Valley.

A lover of photography, Shello developed a friendship with the Kurdish photographer Zaher Rashid, often visiting his studio in Qaladiza. According to Rashid, Shello liked to have her pictures taken and distributed so that people would know that she was a Peshmerga and to inspire other women to join the fight like she had. The photographs of Shello in military clothing alongside weapons were heavily circulated in Iraq and eventually reached Europe, where they gave a romanticized image of the Kurdish cause. Soon she became known in the west as the "Joan of Arc of the Kurdish Revolution". Shello's propaganda power might have made her a higher priority target than the leader of the Kurdish movement, Mustafa Barzani. Though she never joined any other movement outright, Shello did also show support for movements that sought to create an autonomous Assyria.

Some sources state that Shello after several years of service ceased to be a commander, either leaving to care for her father or being dismissed from the command of her unit due to her enthusiasm for further leadership.

=== Death ===
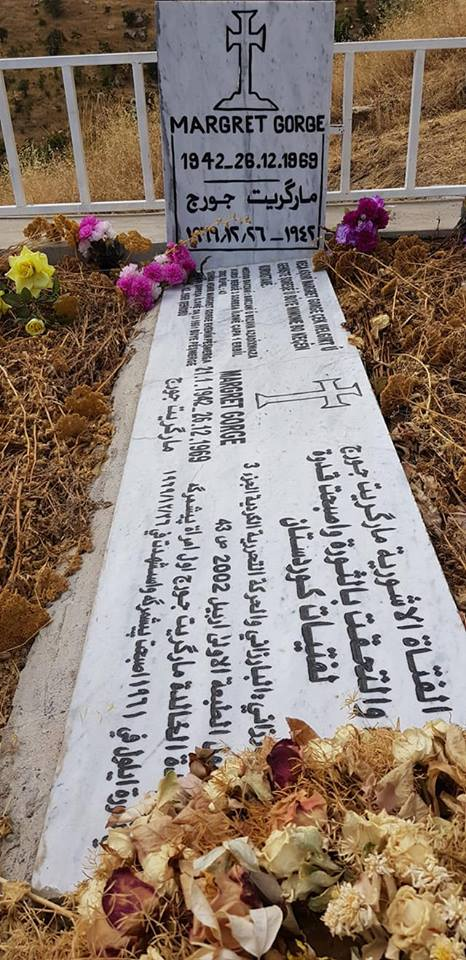
Shello's grave in Dūra

Shello was killed on 26 December 1969. There are several contradictory accounts concerning the manner of her death. Generally speaking, Assyrians tend to believe that she was killed for calling for the recognition of the rights of the Assyrians at a meeting of the Kurdistan Democratic Party. Kurds on the other hand tend to believe that Shello was killed because she was sexually involved with a high-ranking KDP official, perhaps Barzani himself, and that her death was thus an honor crime. Rumors spread by the enemies of the Peshmerga that Shello was Barzani's mistress at the very least damaged his reputation. Other attributed causes of death include being executed by Barzani after demanding a higher leadership position, killed by a spurned lover, and being assassinated by either the Iraqi government or a rival Kurdish faction.

Shello's funeral ceremony was held in her home village of Dūra. She was buried as a hero and the funeral was among others attended by Y.C. and I.I., anonymous leaders of the Kheith Kheith Allap II movement (one of the at the time prominent groups working for Assyrian autonomy). The Kheith Kheith Allap II leaders claimed that Shelllo had been imprisoned together with her mother by the Kurdistan Democratic Party and shot with fifty bullets in her prison cell while asleep. The attendees of Shello's funeral fired volleys of shots into the air in her honor.

== Legacy ==
Shello is one of the most famous Peshmerga commanders and one of the most famous modern women from Iraqi Kurdistan. Members of the Kurdish national movement proudly pointed to Shello as proof of the equal position of the Kurdish women, though they usually omitted that she was not Kurdish but instead belonged to the Christian Assyrian minority; participation in military activities was for Kurds restricted to men until the 1970s. As one of the few female commanders in the 1960s, Shello became a symbol of bravery, a cult figure and an icon among the later women of the Peshmerga. Peshmerga fighters began to carry her portrait into battle like a talisman. This practice is still retained by some of the female Peshmerga fighters, among whom Shello is still idolized. Myths and folk songs were spread concerning Shello after her death. She continued to be known as the "Joan of Arc of Kurdistan" and also acquired other nicknames, such as the "second Shamiram", Dayika Kurdistan ("mother of Kurdistan") and Dayika Peshmerga ("mother of the Peshmerga").

The Christians of northern Iraq have also found Shello to be an inspiring figure, since she is regarded to have been the first Christian woman in Iraq to take up arms. There have been calls in the Iraqi Kurdistan region for the creation of a statue commemorating Shello. Numerous aspects remain controversial in regard to Shello, most notably her ideological sympathies and the manner of her death. These disagreements result from the limited surviving textual records – Shello left no memoirs and all of her letters to other fighters have been destroyed – and the wish of many, often competing, groups to represent her memory.

Shello's grave was renovated and re-inaugurated on 26 June 2018. Her sister participated in the ceremony.
