= David McDowall (author) =

British author (born 1945)

David Buchanan McDowall (born 1945) is a British author specialising in Middle Eastern and British history.

== Early life ==
Born in London in 1945, he attended the Royal Military Academy Sandhurst. and St John’s College, Oxford where he studied Islamic History and Modern Middle East Studies under Albert Hourani

== Career ==
Royal Artillery, in Britain and Hong Kong, 1965-70; British Council, in Bombay and Baghdad, 1972-77; the United Nations Relief and Works Agency for Palestine Refugees (UNRWA), Beirut and Vienna, 1977-79; self-employed thereafter, Oxfam relief worker Lebanon 1982, full-time research and writing from 1983.

== Reception ==
McDowall's 1989 book Palestine and Israel: The Uprising and Beyond received a critical review from Abdulhadi Khalaf in the Journal of Palestine Studies. He criticized what he described as selective use of evidence, unsupported conclusions, and methodological weaknesses, concluding that the work resembled a political commentary more than a rigorously substantiated scholarly study.

On the other hand, it was reviewed favourably by other Middle East specialists:

‘Patrick Seale, writing in The Observer, praised the book as well-researched and recommended it to readers interested in the conflict. (The Observer, 30 July 1989)

‘… both factual and sophisticated… well-written and succinct analytical work…’ Palestinian Professor Ibrahim Abu-Lughod in the Journal of Political and Military Sociology (Journal of Political and Military Sociology, vol. 19 No. 1, Summer 1991)

‘This book should be read by all policy makers.’ Sir Anthony Parsons (Middle East diplomat, foreign policy adviser to Margaret Thatcher), in The Spectator (The Spectator, 5 August 1989, p.30)

== Personal life ==
Married to writer Elizabeth Laird, in 1975; two children: Angus, journalist, and William, academic.

== Selected publications ==
Middle East

- Lebanon: A Conflict of Minorities (Minority Rights Group, 1983), ISBN 978-0-946690-07-7.
- Palestine and Israel: The Uprising and Beyond (IBTauris, 1989), ISBN 978-1-85043-131-2, University of California Press, Berkeley, 1990), ISBN 0-520-06902-1
- Europe and the Arabs: Discord or Symbiosis? (Royal Institute for International Affairs, 1992), ISBN 978-0-905031-53-8
- A Modern History of the Kurds (IBTauris, London & New York, 1996, 1997 2000 and 4th ed., 2021) ISBN 978-0-7556-0079-3.

Britain

- An Illustrated History of Britain (Longman, 1989) ISBN 978-0-582-74914-6
- Britain in Close-up (Longman, 1993), ISBN 978-0-582-06461-4
- Hampstead Heath (co-authored by Deborah Wolton, Frances Lincoln 2007), ISBN 978-0-7112-2653-1

Children's books

- The Palestinians (Franklin Watts, 1986), ISBN 978-0-86313-484-5, winner of The Other Award 1987
- The Columbus Project Book (Hodder, 1992), ISBN 978-0-340-52780-1
- The Spanish Armada (Batsford, 1988), ISBN 978-0-7134-5671-4.

British landscape guides

- Richmond Park: The Walker’s Guide (1996, 2006), ISBN 978-0-9527847-4-6
- Hampstead Heath: The Walker’s Guide co-author Deborah Wolton, (1998, 2021), ISBN 978-1-8381980-1-5
- The Thames from Hampton to Richmond Bridge: The Walker’s Guide (2002), ISBN 978-0-9527847-2-2
- The Thames from Richmond to Putney Bridge: The Walker’s Guide (2005), ISBN 978-0-9527847-3-9
- Windsor Great Park: The Walker’s Guide (2007, 2021), ISBN 978-1-8381980-0-8.
- Bute: A Guide (2010) ISBN 978-0-9527847-7-7
- West Surrey: Walks into History (2013) ISBN 978-0-9527847-8-4
