= 2023 unrest in Kirkuk =

2023 civil unrest in Iraq

2023 Unrest in Kirkuk
- Part of the Iraqi-Kurdish conflict
Date	26 August 2023
Location	Kirkuk, Iraq
Result	Kurdish pro-KDP counter-protests lethally suppressed; Iraqi Government imposes curfew; Transfer of former KDP HQ halted by the Iraqi Supreme Court

Belligerents
Arab and Turkmen anti-KDP protesters	Kurdistan Democratic Party; Pro-KDP Kurdish counter-protesters

Casualties and losses
None	4 protesters killed
- 16 injured, 40 detained. Among injured were Arabs, Kurds and Turkmen.

The 2023 unrest in Kirkuk was an incident involving Arab, Kurdish and Turkmen residents of the city of Kirkuk, Iraq. It began on 26 August 2023, after a building that used to be the headquarters of the Kurdistan Democratic Party (which was used at the time by the Iraqi Armed Forces as a Joint Operations Command) was about to be transferred back to the former. Two days later, on 28 August, Arab and Turkmen residents of Kirkuk staged a sit-in in front of the building to prevent its transfer as well as blocked the main road between Erbil and Kirkuk. In response, pro-KDP Kurds initiated counter-protests as well as demanded the opening of the blocked road. The protests were lethally suppressed by Iraqi security forces leading to the deaths of four Kurdish protesters. The transfer of the building was halted by the Supreme Court of Iraq.

In an interview aired on state-run Al-Iraqiya on 12 September 2023, Prime Minister al-Sudani admitted that tensions in the city were related to the provincial elections, “distrust”, and the lack of harmony among the city's ethnic groups due to longstanding issues.

== Background ==
The tensions center around a building in Kirkuk that once served as the headquarters of Kurdistan Democratic Party (KDP). The party vacated the building after Iraqi forces seized Kirkuk in response to the 2017 Kurdish independence referendum. The building has been occupied by Iraqi security forces since then and converted into a Joint Operations Command (JOC). The tensions flared after Prime Minister al-Sudani ordered the return of the building to KDP on 1 September, 2023, under an agreement made with the aforementioned party when al-Sudani formed his government in October 2022.

== Events ==
On August 28, Arab and Turkmen protesters staged a sit-in in front of the former Kurdistan Democratic Party headquarters, calling for the halting of the handover of the building and to prevent the party from resuming its operations in Kirkuk. Protesters reportedly erected a tent and blocked the main road connecting Kirkuk and Erbil, the capital of the Kurdistan Region, hampering movement between Kirkuk and the Kurdistan Region of Iraq in order to obstruct the return of the KDP.

Tensions escalated with the arrival of Kurdish counter-protesters, culminating in the deployment of Iraqi security forces and the use of excessive and deadly force to dispel protesters.

During the protests, four Kurdish pro-KDP protesters were killed, three of whom were shot dead. In total, 16 individuals were wounded (including Arabs and Turkmen) and another 40 were detained. The next day, Iraqi authorities imposed a curfew and the transfer of the building was halted by the Supreme Court.

== Reactions ==
Iraqi Prime Minister Mohammed Shia' Al Sudani ordered an investigation into the circumstances leading to the deaths of Kurdish protesters. The Prime Minister of Kurdistan Region Masrour Barzani called on the country's authorities to protect the lives of people in the province of Kirkuk.

== See also ==
- Iraqi-Kurdish conflict
- Disputed territories of northern Iraq
