= Mahmoud Ezidi =

Kurdish Peshmerga fighter

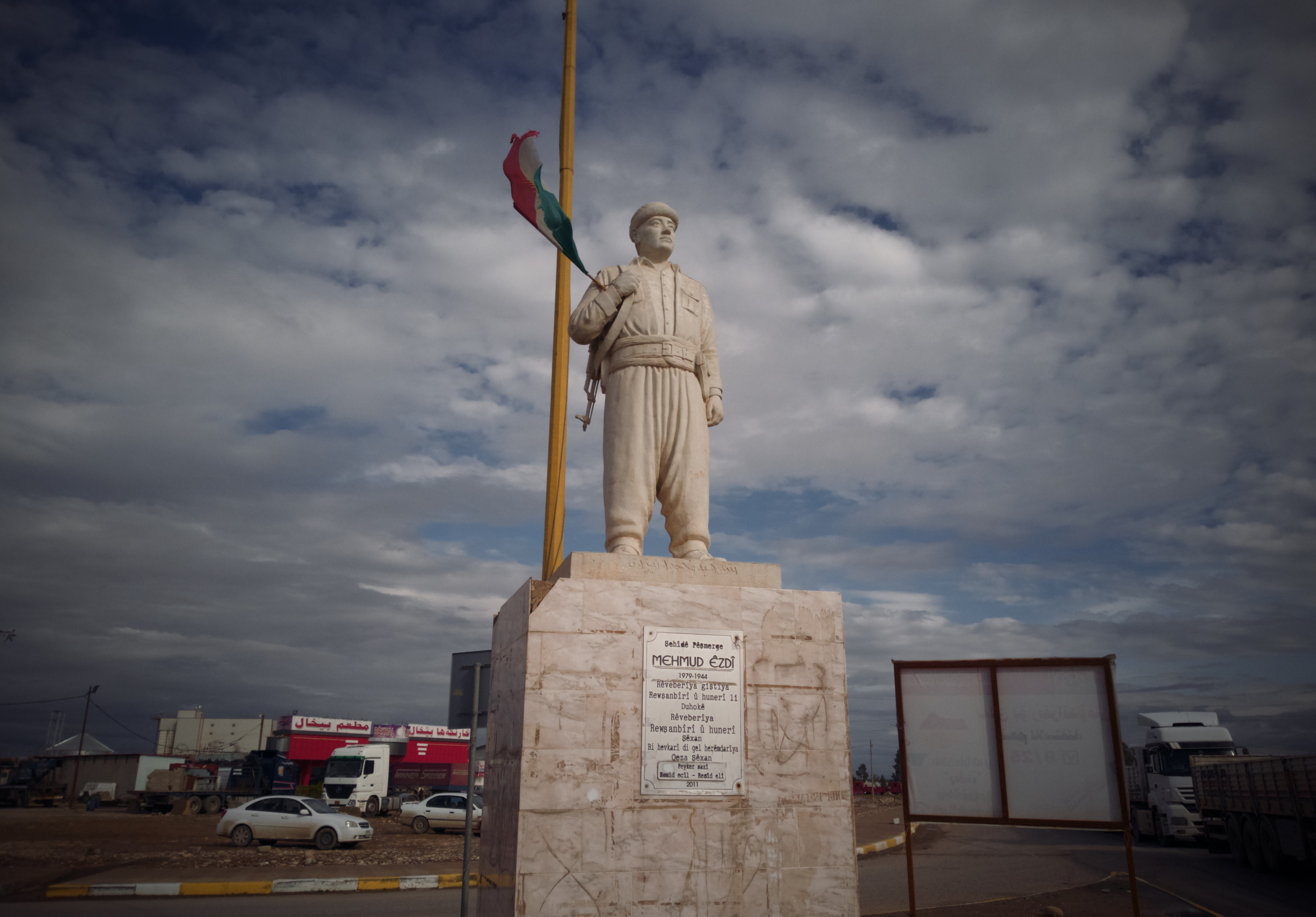
- Statue of Mahmoud Ezidi in Shekhan, erected in his honour in 2011
- Born: Hashem Ilyas Silo; 1944; Baadre, Iraqi Kurdistan
- Died: 18 August 1979 (aged 34–35); Rudniya village, Amedi District
- Cause of death: Assassination
- Burial place: Lalish
- Children: Eldest son Mahmoud (party official)
- Military career
- Allegiance: Kurdistan Democratic Party
- Service: Peshmerga
- Years of service: 1962–1974 (Iraqi Army), 1974–1979 (Peshmerga)
- Rank: Deputy officer (Iraqi Army), Commander (Peshmerga)
- Known for: Leading Kurdish resistance against Ba'athist Iraq
- Major battles: Iraqi–Kurdish conflict
- Memorials: Statue in Shekhan (2011), school named after him in Baadre

Hashim Ilyas Silo (Kurdish: Haşim Îlyas Silo; 1944 – 18 August 1979, known as Mahmoud Ezidi, was a famous Yazidi Peshmerga fighter loyal to Kurdistan Democratic Party, who led many successful military confrontations against the regime of Ba'athist Iraq.

Prior to becoming a Peshmerga fighter in 1974, he had been conscripted in the Iraqi army at the age of 18, later becoming promoted to deputy officer due to his commitment to fulfilling his military duties and performing well in training. He secretly joined Kurdistan Democratic Party in 1963 and was a member from then on. In 1970, after the Iraqi–Kurdish Autonomy Agreement, Mahmoud Ezidi revealed his allegiance with KDP, started being openly engaged and also established direct relations with other party cadres. In 1974, after the collapse of the 1970 Iraqi-Kurdish Autonomy Agreement and due to persecution by the Iraqi regime, Mahmoud Ezidi joined the Kurdish struggle and started serving in the rebel Peshmerga forces.

== Biography ==
=== Early life ===
Mahmoud Ezidi was born in 1944 as Hashim Ilyas Silo in the village of Baadre in Shekhan district. He was from a poor Yezidi family of the Hakkari tribe and attended Baadre Primary School from 16 September 1951. He was an active pupil who obtained high marks in the first and second grades of primary school. However, due to the difficult living conditions of his family, he had to leave school to help his father with farming and earning a living. He lived with four brothers and four sisters. In 1962, after reaching the age of 18, he was enrolled in the Iraqi military to perform compulsory military service.

=== Political and Military career ===
Due to his commitment to the duties assigned to him and good performance in military training, Mahmoud Ezidi was promoted to the rank of deputy officer in the city of Najaf. However, he also joined the Kurdistan Democratic Party in secret in 1963 and was committed to carrying out party duties, handing out partisan literature and newspapers, and establishing partisan ties with high-ranking party cadres. He read a lot of pamphlets and books to arm himself with knowledge in political culture, military science and art.

In 1970, after the Iraqi–Kurdish Autonomy Agreement, Mahmoud Ezidi revealed his allegiance with KDP, started being openly engaged and established more direct, open relations with other party cadres. In 1974, after the collapse of the agreement and due to persecution by the Iraqi regime, Mahmoud Ezidi partook in the Kurdish struggle and started serving in the Peshmerga.

After the collapse of the Kurdish National Liberation Movement as a result of the 1975 Algiers Agreement between Iran and Iraq which led to Iran abruptly ending its military support for the Kurdish Movement, many members of the KDP and Peshmerga started vacating the mountains of Kurdistan and sought refuge in Iran. From Iran, Mustafa Barzani continued to lead the Peshmerga forces in order to perpetuate the revolution. He sent a number of party members, including Mahmoud Ezidi, to Syria in order to prepare the Kurds there for the future resumption of the revolution.

After returning to Kurdistan, Mahmoud Ezidi secretly began to perform his political activities among the local masses, especially the Yazidi Kurds. In a short period, he was able to regather the former KDP members and cadres, and prepare them for the May Revolution (Şoreşa Gulanê) against the Iraqi regime, which started in 1975. He also successfully recruited many other Yazidis into the KDP ranks.

From 1976-1979, Mahmoud Ezidi and his comrades carried out many partisan activities such as distributing leaflets and launched attacks on regime locations including military positions and police centers or stations across many different territories in Kurdistan. On the night of 12 September 1976, Mahmoud Ezidi led a team of 15 Peshmerga, among them his fellow Yazidis, in an attack against a government military position located in Gali Qiyamate. They killed several regime soldiers and were successfully able to take control of the position. About a week later, he led another attack against military positions in the Bilkif and Mizury areas in Shekhan district, where one Peshmerga was captured after being wounded by regime soldiers.

Mahmoud Ezidi also resisted the Arabization policies under Ba'athist Iraq, particularly the resettlement of Arab tribes in Yazidi areas, attacking Arab settlements many times. In the spring of 1977, he led a group of Peshmerga, which included Yazidis, and attacked Arab tents near Basawa village in the Faida Quarter of Duhok Province. In the same year, Mahmoud Ezidi endeavoured to persuade Arab tribes who had settled in the Bilan village of Shekhan to leave. He requested a meeting and the Arabs agreed to attend. But upon the arrival of Mahmoud Ezidi and his comrades, they were ambushed by the Arabs who had help from Iraqi commandos and aircraft. The Peshmerga killed about 15 Iraqi soldiers in the ensuing battle. The movements of Mahmoud Ezidi and his comrades had closely been monitored by the Iraqi regime as they travelled to the villages to perform partisan work. As a result, they were caught in ambushes by the Iraqi army numerous times.

In May 1978, Mahmoud Ezidi and his Peshmerga were ambushed near Avrik village in Muzuri territory, but managed to survive. In another instance when they were in Nisra village, the village was besieged by regime soldiers who carried out house-to-house searches, leading to clashes, but Mahmoud Ezidi and his Peshmerga were once again able to successfully escape. In the summer of the same year, another battle took place near Daka village in Faida area between the regime soldiers and the Peshmerga who were headed by Mahmoud Ezidi. After inflicting casualties on the government forces, the Peshmerga retreated to Daka mountain, Mahmoud Ezidi led many other attacks against the Ba'ath headquarters and policy centers in Sarsink and Alqosh.

=== Death ===
On the night of 18 August 1979 in Rudniya village of Amedi district, Mahmoud Ezidi was treacherously assassinated by the hands of a traitor. In 1985, under the supervision of Silo Kheder and other party cadres in the Shekhan Committee, his body was moved from Bari Kara village to Kani Masi in Barwari Jori area. Later, after Kurdistan was liberated, as per the wishes of his family, he was buried again on 18 August 2003 at his final resting place in Lalish Sanctuary with great ceremonies held on his funeral and a large attendance including many party and administrative officials. In 2002, a school in Baadre was opened and named after Mahmoud Ezidi by Kurdistan Regional Government. Mahmoud Ezidi's eldest son, Mahmoud, was appointed as a member of the party leadership in charge of the 20th branch. In 2011, a statue of him was erected at the intersection of Shekhan in his honour.
