= Iraqi–Kurdish Autonomy Agreement of 1970 =

Peace treaty between Iraq and Iraqi-Kurdish forces

Iraqi–Kurdish Autonomy Agreement of 1970 (or the Iraqi–Kurdish peace talks or the 1970 Peace Accord) was an agreement, which the Iraqi government and the leader of the Kurdistan Democratic Party Mustafa Barzani reached on March 11, 1970 in the aftermath of the First Iraqi–Kurdish War. It stipulated the creation of an Autonomous Region, consisting of the three Kurdish governorates and other adjacent districts that have been determined by census to have a Kurdish majority. The plan also gave Kurds representation in government bodies, to be implemented in four years. At the time it was the most serious attempt to resolve the long-running Iraqi–Kurdish conflict.

Despite this, the Iraqi government embarked on an Arabization program in the oil rich regions of Kirkuk and Khanaqin during the same period. Eventually, the peace plan for the Kurdish autonomy failed; re-erupting into the Second Iraqi–Kurdish War in 1974, thus escalating the Kurdish–Iraqi conflict.

== Articles ==
1. The Kurdish language shall be, alongside the Arabic language, the official language in areas with a Kurdish majority; and will be the language of instruction in those areas and taught throughout Iraq as a second language.
2. Kurds will participate fully in government, including senior and sensitive posts in the cabinet and army.
3. Kurdish education and culture will be reinforced.
4. All officials in Kurdish majority areas shall be Kurds or at least Kurdish-speaking.
5. Kurds shall be free to establish student, youth, women's and teachers' organisations of their own.
6. Funds will be set aside for the development of Kurdistan.
7. Pensions and assistance will be provided for the families of martyrs and others stricken by poverty, unemployment or homelessness.
8. Kurds and Arabs will be restored to their former place of habitation.
9. The Agrarian Reform will be implemented.
10. The Constitution will be amended to read "The Iraqi people is made up of two nationalities, the Arab nationality and the Kurdish nationality."
11. The broadcasting station and heavy weapons will be returned to the Government.
12. A Kurd shall be one of the vice-presidents.
13. The Governorates (Provincial) Law shall be amended in a manner conforming with the substance of this declaration.
14. Unification of areas with a Kurdish majority as a self-governing unit.
15. The Kurdish people shall share in the legislative power in a manner proportionate to its population in Iraq.

== Implementation ==
Tariq Aziz retrospectively stated "We were sincere when we announced the 11 March Manifesto. It wasn't propaganda." Mulla Mustafa Barzani saw it as too good to be true, but signed nevertheless due to pressure from the Kurdish communities.

Within a month of signing, most articles were implemented, and by December Mulla Mustafa Barzani was optimistic about autonomy, but by the end of the year it became clear that the Ba'ath party was just playing for time, as there was an attempt on his son's life. The census for disputed areas was postponed twice, and by 1973 the Accord had collapsed.

== See also ==
- Kurdistan Regional Government
- Kurdistan independence movement
- Mustafa Barzani
- Ba'athist Iraq
- Legislative Council of the Autonomous Kurdistan Region
- A Modern History of the Kurds by David McDowall
