= Second Iraqi–Kurdish War =

1974–1975 Kurdish rebellion in northern Iraq

- Part of the Iraqi–Kurdish conflict and the Cold War
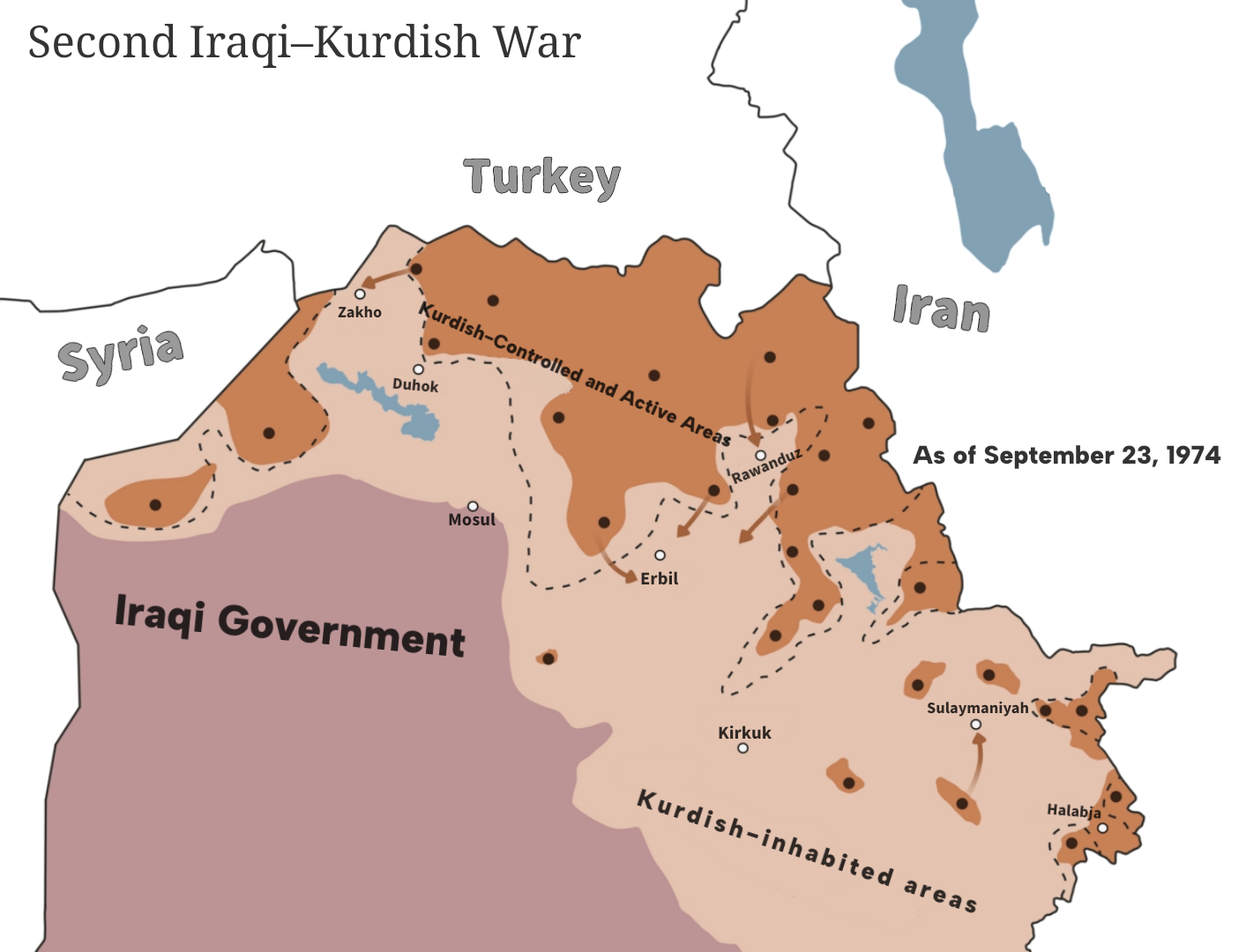
Date	1974–1975 (1 year)
Location	Northern Iraq
Result	Iraqi victory: KDP military and strategic failure; Peshmerga fighting ability destroyed; KDP–Iraq cease-fire; Failed PUK low-level insurgency; Iran withdrew its support for KDP; 1975 Algiers Agreement
Territorial changes	Iraqi government reinstates full control over Kurdish-majority territories

Belligerents
Iraq; Supported by: Soviet Union	KDP; Iran; Supported by: Israel; United States

Commanders and leaders
Ahmed Hassan al-Bakr; Saddam Hussein	Mustafa Barzani; Mohammad Reza Pahlavi

Strength
90,000 troops 1,200 tanks and AFVs; 200 aircraft (not all engaged)	100,000–110,000 fighters 350,000 troops

Casualties and losses
2,500–7,000 killed	10,000 killed
- Total: 7,000+ to 20,000 killed 600,000 displaced 280,000 Kurds fled to Iran

The Second Iraqi–Kurdish War was the second chapter of the Barzani rebellion, initiated by the collapse of the Kurdish autonomy talks and the consequent Iraqi offensive against rebel KDP troops of Mustafa Barzani during 1974–1975. The war came in the aftermath of the First Iraqi–Kurdish War (1961–1970), as the 1970 peace plan for Kurdish autonomy had failed to be implemented by 1974. Unlike the previous guerrilla campaign in 1961–1970, waged by Barzani, the 1974 war was a Kurdish attempt at symmetric warfare against the Iraqi Army, which eventually led to the quick collapse of the Kurds, who were lacking advanced and heavy weaponry. The war ended with the exile of the Iraqi KDP party and between 7,000–20,000 deaths from both sides combined.

== Background ==
Kurds led by Mustafa Barzani were engaged in heavy fighting against successive Iraqi regimes from 1960 to 1975. The First Iraqi–Kurdish War (1961–1970) led to a stalemate and in March 1970 Iraq announced a peace plan providing for Kurdish autonomy. The plan was to be implemented in four years. However, at the same time, the Iraqi regime started an Arabization program in the oil-rich regions of Kirkuk and Khanaqin.

== Iraqi campaign ==
The 1970 peace agreement did not last long, and in 1974, the Iraqi government began a new offensive against the Kurdish rebels, pushing them close to the border with Iran. As in the First Iraqi-Kurdish War, the Kurds received material support from Iran and Israel. Israel regarded the Iraqi Armed Forces as a possible threat in case of renewed fighting between Israel and Syria (during the 1973 War about one third of Iraq's army had been sent to fight against Israel on the Syrian front) and so wished to keep the Iraqis occupied elsewhere. Iran wished to strengthen its own political and military position vis-à-vis Iraq—the only other regional power in the Persian Gulf.

=== Iraq begins negotiations with Iran ===
As the fighting progressed, Iraq informed Tehran that it was willing to satisfy Iranian demands in return for an end to its aid to the Kurds. In March 1975, with mediation by Algerian President Houari Boumédiènne, Iraq and Iran signed the Algiers Accord. According to the accord Iran would quit supplying the Iraqi Kurds in return for the transfer of Iraqi territory to Iran—especially half the width of the Shatt al-Arab, the river through which ships could sail to a number of major Iranian ports. Israel's aid to the Kurds was being transferred through Iran, so Iran's decision also prevented the continuation of Israeli aid to the Kurds (the only other possible route being Turkey which was also hostile to the idea of a Kurdish autonomy in northern Iraq as a dangerous precedent for the Kurds in eastern Turkey). Following this development, Barzani escaped to Iran with many of his supporters. Others surrendered en masse and the rebellion ended within a short time. The casualties of the war are estimated around 5,000 soldiers and civilians.

== Aftermath ==
Despite its failures, the war had united the Sorani, Badini, and Feyli Kurds, whose differences had hindered earlier Kurdish movements. After the revolt, the Iraqi government extended its control over the Iraqi Kurdistan after fifteen years and in order to secure its influence, started an Arabization program by moving Arabs to the vicinity of oil fields in northern Iraq, particularly the ones around Kirkuk. The repressive measures carried out by the government against the Kurds after the Algiers agreement led to renewed clashes between the Iraqi Army and Kurdish guerrillas in 1977. In 1978 and 1979, 600 Kurdish villages were burned down and around 200,000 Kurds were deported to other parts of the country.

In the early 1980s, with the eruption of the Iran–Iraq War, another Kurdish rebellion erupted in northern Iraq, initiated with Iranian support. The revolt ended with a massive killing campaign by Saddam Hussein in 1986–1989. During the Al-Anfal campaign an estimated 182,000 Kurds lost their lives in north Iraq and hundreds of thousands forced to become refugees, fleeing mostly to neighbouring Iran.

The area underwent chaos again in 1991 following the Persian Gulf War. Encouraged by Saddam's defeat in Kuwait, Shi'a Arabs and Iraqi Kurds revolted against the Ba'athist regime. The defection of the government-recruited Kurdish Jash home guard militia gave considerable force to the revolt. Following the Iraqi no-fly zones conflict during which the United States, United Kingdom and France enforced two no-fly zones in Iraq, the Kurds had a chance to establish self-rule after the Iraqi armed forces withdrew from parts of northern Iraq.

== See also ==
- Iraqi Kurdistan
- List of modern conflicts in the Middle East
- Legislative Council of the Autonomous Kurdistan Region
