= First Iraqi–Kurdish War =

1961–1970 conflict between Iraq and Kurdish militias

- Part of the Iraqi–Kurdish conflict and the Arab–Israeli conflict
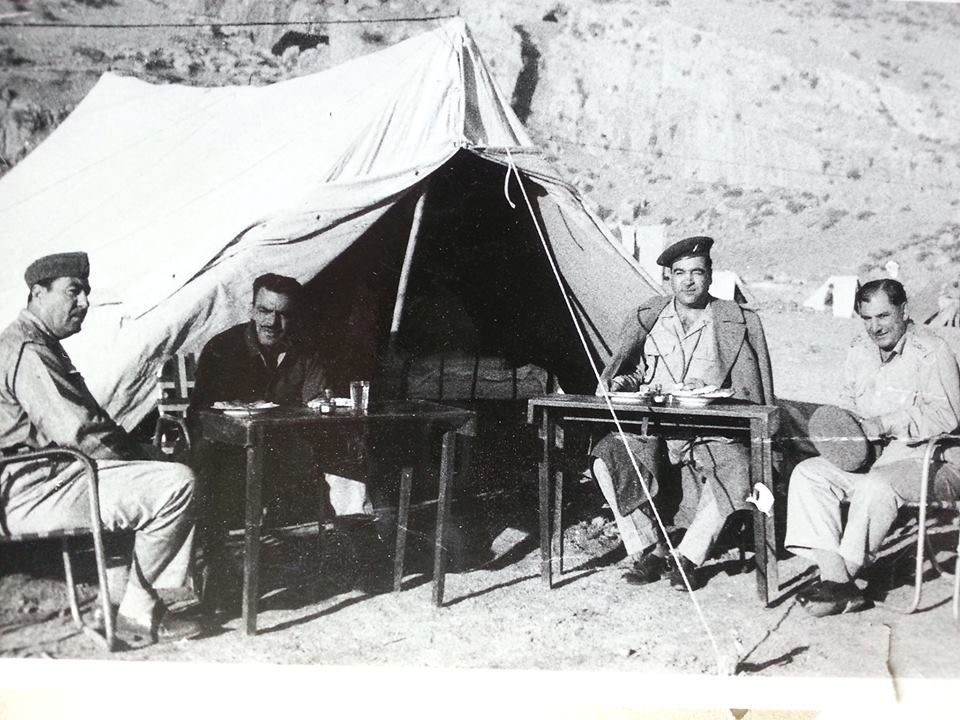
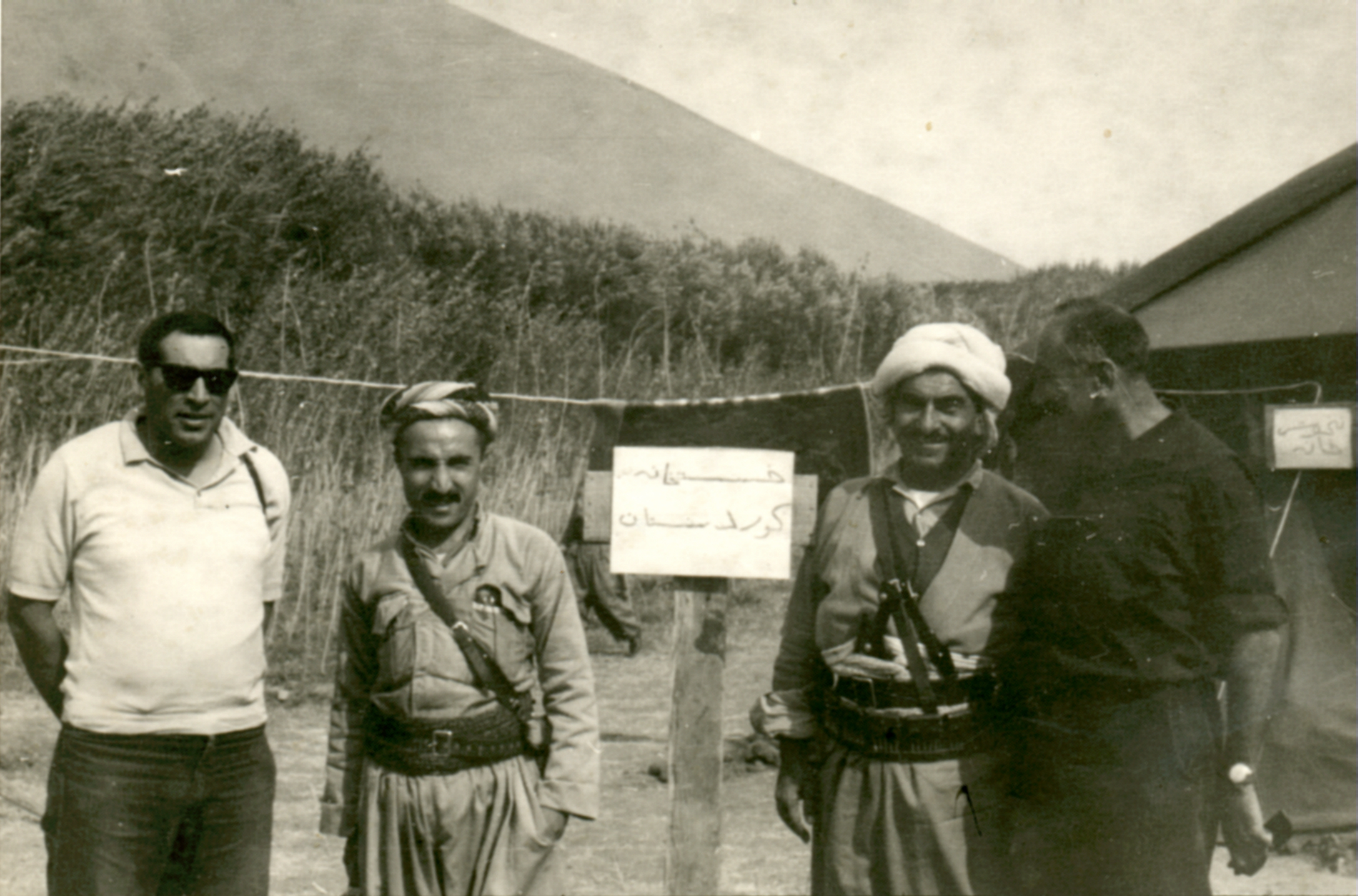
- Clockwise from top left: Iraqi Army officers stationed in northern Iraq, 1966; Kurdish rebel leaders at an Israel Defense Forces (IDF) field hospital in northern Iraq, c. 1960s; Iraqi Vice President Saddam Hussein meeting Kurdish leader Mustafa Barzani prior to signing the Iraqi–Kurdish Autonomy Agreement and ending hostilities, 1970
| Date | 11 September 1961 – March 1970 |
| Location | Northern Iraq |
| Result | Military stalemate: Iraqi–Kurdish Autonomy Agreement; Arabization program continued |

Belligerents
| KDP; Supported by: Iran; Israel; United States (alleged) | Before 1968: Iraq; Syria (1963); Supported by: United States (1963); Egypt (1965); United Kingdom (1963) After 1968: Ba'athist Iraq |

Commanders and leaders
| Mustafa Barzani; Ahmed Barzani; Ibrahim Ahmad; Jalal Talabani; Ali Askari; Kamal Mufti; Margaret George Shello X (Assyrian homeland) Hurmiz Chikko † (Israel) Tsuri Sagi (1966) | Abdul Karim Qasim (executed) Ali Salih al-Sa'di; Abdul Salam Arif ‽ Abdul Rahman Arif; Ahmed al-Bakr; Saddam Hussein |

Strength
| 15,000–20,000 | 48,000 (1969) (Syria) 6,000 |

Casualties and losses
| Unknown | 5,000–10,000 killed |
- Total: 100,000 killed

The First Iraqi–Kurdish War (Arabic: الحرب العراقية الكردية الأولى), also known as the September Revolution (Kurdish: شۆڕشی ئەیلوول), was an armed conflict and major event of the Iraqi–Kurdish conflict, lasting from 1961 until 1970. The conflict was led by Mustafa Barzani, in an attempt to establish an independent Kurdistan. Throughout the 1960s, the insurgency escalated into a long war, which failed to resolve despite internal power changes in Iraq. During the war, 80% of the Iraqi army was engaged in combat with the Kurds. A series of Iraqi–Kurdish negotiations followed the war in an attempt to resolve the conflict, ultimately leading to the Iraqi–Kurdish Autonomy Agreement of 1970, which eventually failed, reigniting war between the two sides in the Second Iraqi–Kurdish War.

== Background ==
After the military coup by Abdul Karim Qasim in 1958, Barzani was invited by Qasim to return from exile. As part of a deal arranged by Qasim and Barzani, Qasim promised to give the Kurds regional autonomy in return for Barzani's support for his policies. Meanwhile, during 1959–1960, Barzani became the head of the Kurdistan Democratic Party (KDP), which was granted legal status in 1960.

== Warfare ==
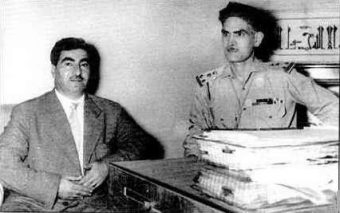
Mustafa Barzani with Abd al-Karim Qasim.

By early 1960, it became apparent that Qasim would not follow through with his promise of regional autonomy. As a result, the KDP began to agitate for regional autonomy. In the face of growing Kurdish dissent, as well as Barzani's personal power, Qasim began to incite the Barzanis historical enemies, the Bradost and Zebari tribes, which led to intertribal warfare throughout 1960 and early 1961. By February 1961, Barzani had mostly defeated the pro-government forces and Jash tribes slowly started submitting to him. At this point, Barzani ordered his forces to occupy and expel government officials from all Kurdish territory and issued an ultimatum to Baghdad demanding Kurdish autonomy. In September a local tribe (the Arkou) attacked an Iraqi army column, prompting a direct response from the government. Qasim ordered airstrikes on Barzani’s positions, stopping his push near the border. This was not received well in Baghdad, and as a result, Qasim began to prepare for a military offensive against the north to return government control of the region. Meanwhile, in June 1961, the KDP issued a detailed ultimatum to Qasim outlining Kurdish grievances and demanded rectification. Qasim ignored the Kurdish demands and continued his planning for war. It was not until September 10, when an Iraqi army column was ambushed by a group of Kurds, that the Kurdish revolt truly began. In response to the attack, Qasim lashed out and ordered the Iraqi Air Force to indiscriminately bomb Kurdish villages, which ultimately served to rally the entire Kurdish population to Barzani's standard.

Kurdish villages were targeted by United States supplied munitions consisting napalm bombs numbering 1,000 and 4,000 other bombs which were given by the United States to the Ba'athist government in Baghdad to use against the Kurds. Entire Kurdish villages and livestock were incinerated by the napalm bombs. The decision to supply napalm and other weapons to the Ba'athist was backed by American President Kennedy. Napalm bombs were also sold to Iraq by the United Kingdom. French Ambassador Bernard Dorin witnessed a girl in Iraqi Kurdistan whose face was burned off by the UK made bombs.

After the collapse of the Syrian political union with Egypt in 1961, Syria was declared an Arab Republic in the interim constitution. On 23 August 1962, the government conducted a special population census only for the province of Jazira which was predominantly Kurdish. As a result, around 120,000 Kurds in Jazira were arbitrarily categorized as aliens. In addition, a media campaign was launched against the Kurds with slogans such as "Save Arabism in Jazira! " and "Fight the Kurdish threat!". These policies coincided with the beginning of Barzani's uprising in Iraqi Kurdistan and discovery of oilfields in the Kurdish inhabited areas of Syria. In June 1963, Syria took part in the Iraqi military campaign against the Kurds by providing aircraft, armoured vehicles and a force of 6,000 soldiers. Syrian troops crossed the Iraqi border and moved into the Kurdish town of Zakho in pursuit of Barzani's fighters.

The Kurdish uprising received material support from Iran and Israel—both of them wishing to weaken Iraq. Israel regarded the Iraqi military as a possible threat in case of renewed fighting between Israel and Jordan and Syria. Iraqi forces had participated in the 1948 Arab invasion of Israel and Iraq was the only Arab participant in that war who refused to sign ceasefire agreements with Israel. Since then Iraq had on a number of occasions threatened to send forces to assist Jordan against Israel during rounds of border fighting between the two. Therefore, the Israelis wished to keep the Iraqis occupied elsewhere. Another Israeli interest was Kurdish assistance for Jews still living in Iraq to escape through Kurdish territory to Israel. Iran wished to strengthen its own political and military position vis-à-vis Iraq—the only other regional power in the Persian Gulf—and perhaps wring certain territorial concessions from Iraq in return for ceasing support of the Kurds (this was achieved in 1975, during the Second Iraqi-Kurdish War, but it is not clear when the idea was originally conceived).

In November 1963, after considerable infighting amongst the civilian and military wings of the Ba'athists, they were ousted by Abdul Salam Arif in a coup. Then, after another failed offensive on Kurds, Arif declared a ceasefire in February 1964, which provoked a split among Kurdish urban radicals on one hand and Peshmerga forces, led by Barzani on the other. Barzani agreed to the ceasefire and fired the radicals from the party. Following the unexpected death of Arif, whereupon he was replaced by his brother, Abdul Rahman Arif, the Iraqi government launched a last-ditch effort to defeat the Kurds. which was not implemented due to the overthrow of Abdul Rahman Arif in a 1968 coup by the Baath Party.

The Ba'ath government restarted a campaign to end the Kurdish insurrection, which stalled in 1969. This can be partly attributed to the Shah of Iran supplying the Kurds with weapons and ammunition. With Iranian help the Kurds decisively defeated the Iraqi advance.

The internal power struggle in Baghdad also greatly hindered Iraqi progress. Moreover, the Soviet Union pressured the Iraqis to come to terms with Barzani.

== Peace talks ==
A peace plan was announced in March 1970 and provided for broader Kurdish autonomy. The plan also gave Kurds representation in government bodies, to be implemented in four years. Despite this, the Iraqi government embarked on an Arabization program in the oil rich regions of Kirkuk and Khanaqin in the same period.

== Aftermath ==
In the following years, the Iraqi government overcame its internal divisions and concluded a treaty of friendship with the Soviet Union in April 1972 and ended its isolation within the Arab world. On the other hand, Kurds remained dependent on the Iranian military support and could do little to strengthen their forces. By 1974 the situation in the north escalated again into the Second Iraqi–Kurdish War, which lasted until 1975 and ended in Iraqi victory.

== See also ==
- Battle of Mount Handrin
- Ramadan Revolution
- 1983–1986 Kurdish rebellions in Iraq
- 1991 uprisings in Iraq
- List of modern conflicts in the Middle East
- A Modern History of the Kurds by David McDowall
