= Jash (term) =

Kurdish derogatory term

- Origin: Kurdish
- Original form: جەحش, Cehş
- Context: Derogatory term in Kurdish culture
- Meaning: Traitor, collaborator

Jash (Kurdish: جاش, romanized: Caş; from جەحش, Cehş, 'donkey foal') is a Kurdish term for a traitor, or a collaborator. The word meant "baby donkey" in Kurdish but also resembled the Arabic word for "army" (جيش, jaish). It refers to Kurds who are either fully loyal to the enemy, or cooperate with the enemy against the Kurdish nation, Kurdish militant groups, or Kurdish political interests. The term is considered derogatory in a cultural sense, in much the same way as the use of the term quisling in the Western world.

The National Defense Battalions of Baathist Iraq, the Village Guards of Turkey, and the Muslim Peshmerga of Iran are considered "jash" by some Kurds.

== History ==
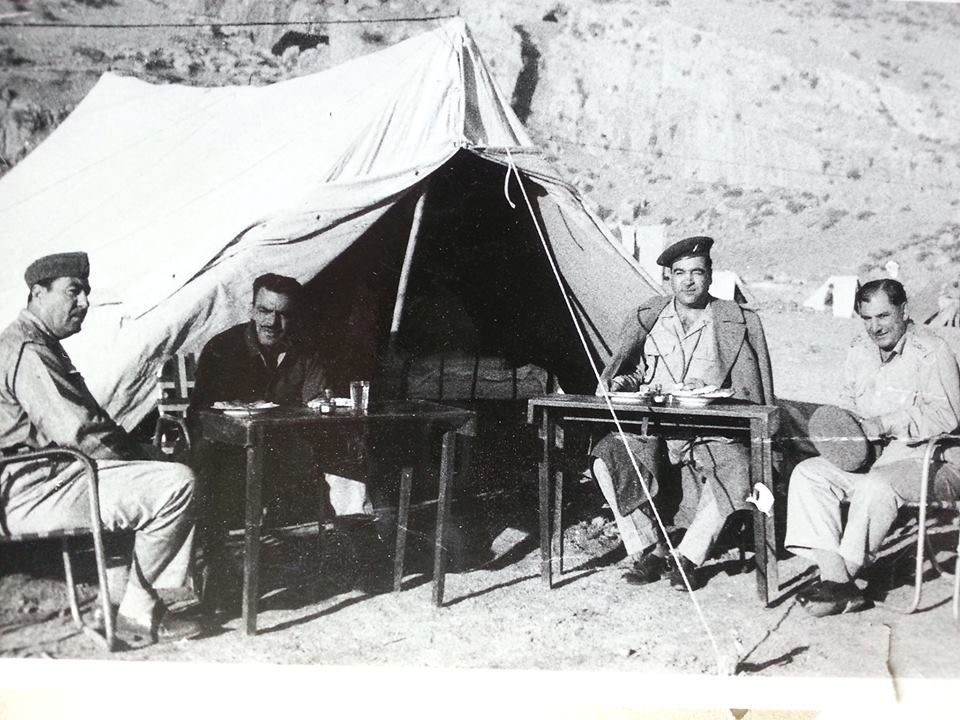
General Major Khaleel Jassim Al-Dabbagh, commander of the Light regiments (first from the right) with Ibrahim Al-Ansari (third from the right) in northern Iraq (1963)

The Light regiments were first established in the 1940s, during the 1943 Barzani revolt in northern Iraq, then it flourished and start to take an important role in the 1960s during the First Iraqi–Kurdish War, when General Khaleel Jassim was in the command of these regiments and associated them with many Iraqi Army operations against the Kurd rebels, specially in Amadiya in 1965 and Rawandiz 1966.

The jash were known as "Fursan" (knights) by the Iraqi government. During the al-Anfal campaign, the military campaign of genocide and looting commanded by Ali Hassan al-Majid, al-Majid's orders informed jash units that taking cattle, sheep, goats, money, weapons and even Kurdish women was legal.

The term "Jash Police" was used by the Kurds towards Iraq's local Kurdish police militias in 1944.

In the latter half of the 20th century, Kurds who became collaborators with the Iraqi government were referred to as jash. The number of jash increased to "as many as 150,000 by 1986" as a method of avoiding military participation in the Iran–Iraq War. The jash then realigned with the rest of the Kurdish people during the 1991 Kurdish uprising. It has been stated by a number of Kurds that "the jash had been completely forgiven".

== See also ==
- Fifth column
- Collaborationism
- Hanjian
- Kapo
- Harki
- Village Guards
