= Legislative Council of the Autonomous Kurdistan Region =

Former legislative body in Iraq

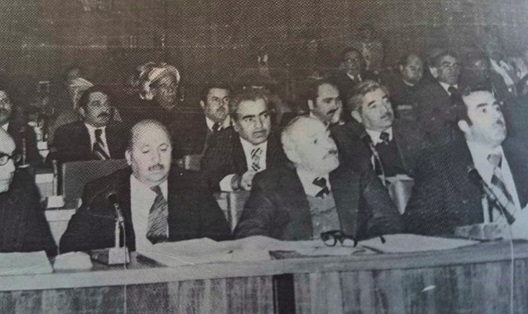
Legislative Council of the Autonomous Kurdistan Region session, 1978

The Legislative Council of the Autonomous Kurdistan Region (Kurdish: ئەنجومەنی یاسادانانی هەرێمی ئۆتۆنۆمی کوردستان, romanized: Encûmenî yasadananî herêmî otonomî Kurdistan; Arabic: المجلس التشريعي لمنطقة كردستان للحكم الذاتي) was a legislative body for the Kurdistan Autonomous Region in northern Iraq consisting of Duhok Governorate, Erbil Governorate and Sulaymaniyah Governorate from 1974 to 2003. This regional assembly had limited powers to legislate on issues relating to health, education, labour and social, cultural and economic development. It was based in Erbil (albeit between 1991 and 2003 the institution was based in Baghdad). Members of the Legislative Council served in three-year periods.

== March 11, 1974 announcement ==
In a unilateral move on March 11, 1974, just before the 4-year deadline outlined in the March 11, 1970 Accord between the Iraqi government and the Kurdistan Democratic Party (KDP) would lapse, the Revolutionary Command Council (RCC) amended the interim constitution of Iraq to provide for autonomy for the Kurdistan Region and issued the Law of Autonomy for the Kurdistan Region. This legislation made mention of an 'elected legislative council'. A few days later a new law was issued, the Law of the Legislative Council of the Kurdistan Region, which instead outlined that the region would have a 'nominated legislative council' during its initial phase. The KDP opposed this move, and argued that the launch of the Legislative Council should have been postponed until a census of the Kurdish populations in the disputed areas of Kirkuk, Sinjar and Khanaqin would be held. Fighting between the KDP and the Iraqi government resumed in March 1974.

The legislation outlined that the Legislative Council would elected an Executive Council for the autonomous region, albeit the Executive Council president would be appointed by the President of Iraq. The President of Iraq would also have the power to dismiss the Legislative and Executive Councils. Until 1978 the members of the Legislative Council would be nominated by the RCC. Appointments of members of the inaugural Legislative Council occurred in August 1974, with members of the dissident KDP faction of Aziz Aqrawi among the nominees.

== First period (1974-1977) ==
The first session of the Legislative Council was held in the building of the Erbil Preparatory School for Boys on October 5, 1974. Dissident KDP leader Hashim Aqrawi and Legislative Council member, had been appointed as the first President of the Executive Council. Babakr Mahmud al-Rasul, a conservative chieftain, served as the Legislative Council speaker for the first period. Ihsan Haibatullah Al-Mufti was the deputy speaker and Ismail Rasul Ahmed the secretary of the Legislative Council. At night Peshmerga forces shot mortar shells at the Hawraman Hotel, where Legislative Council members and journalists covering the event where staying.

== Second period (1978-1980) ==
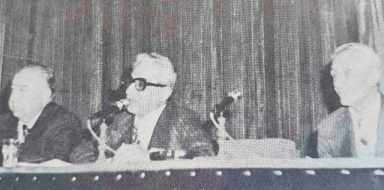
Presidium of the Legislative Council, 1978. From the left: Deputy Speaker Shaker Fattah Ahmed, Speaker Muhammed Ali Amin, Secretary Khalil Hamad Mustafa

The second period of the Legislative Council began in 1978, again the members were appointed from Baghdad. The size of the assembly was decreased to 50 members. Muhammed Ali Amin served as Speaker during this period, Shaker Fattah Ahmed as Deputy Speaker and Khalil Hamad Mustafa as Secretary of the Legislative Council.

== Third period (1980-1983) ==
In mid-December 1979 drafts for new legislations for elections for Iraqi National Assembly and Kurdistan Legislative Council were circulated. On January 1, 1980, the RCC declared that the powers of the president of the Executive Council and the speaker of the Legislative Council would be significantly increased. Subsequently, new legislation outlining the regulations for direct election for the Legislative Council was passed. The new electoral legislations were announced on March 16, 1980. The first elections to the Legislative Council of the Kurdistan Region was held in September 1980. Per official data some 701,000 voters cast their ballots. 194 candidates competed for 50 posts in the assembly. The majority of the elected members were feudal notables or clerics with ties to the Iraqi government.

== Fourth period (1983-1986) ==
The second election to the Legislative Council was held on August 6, 1983, with the assembly expanded to 57 members. Two women were elected to the Legislative Council.

== Fifth period (1986-1989) ==
Elections were held on August 13, 1986. Compared with the previous elections the Baghdad authorities had a much more strict scrutiny of the pre-selection of candidates, in the context of the ongoing war with Iran. The electoral legislation was amended, with a clause demanding that candidates had to be loyal to Ba'athist principles and aims. 146 candidates contested 50 posts in the Legislative Council.

Twenty of the elected members were re-elected incumbents. Three office holders of the outgoing assembly were re-elected, the speaker Ahmad Abdulqader Al-Naqshbandi, the deputy speaker Hikmat Haji Salim Al-Atrushi and the secretary Jamal Jalal. Most of the members of the assembly were government officials, generally between the ages of 30 and 40. The newly elected assembly had several tribal leaders with front-line experiences as commanders of the National Defense Forces. The number of female legislators increased to four. There was not a single university graduate among the elected members. The incumbent Executive Council president Yahya Al-Jaf was removed from his post after the election, with Iraqi President Saddam Hussein appointing Sirwan Abdullah Hussein Al-Jaf as the new Executive Council President.

President Saddam Hussein attended the inaugural session of the newly elected Legislative Council in person. In his speech he affirmed commitment to Kurdish autonomy and stated that Erbil would be designated as the summer capital of Iraq.

== Sixth period (1989-1996) ==
The last elections for the Legislative Council were held on September 9, 1989. After the election Bahauddin Ahmed Faraj became the new speaker of the Legislative Council. Following the 1991 Gulf War, after which the Iraqi government lost control over the Kurdistan Region, the Legislative Council was based in Baghdad. The duration of the legislative period was extended to 1996.

== Seventh period (1996-2003) ==
In 1996 a new Baghdad-based Legislative Council was appointed. In 2000, the term of the Legislative Council was extended by another 3 years. Bahauddin Ahmed Faraj retained the post of Legislative Council Speaker during this period.
