= A Modern History of the Kurds =

1996 book by David McDowall

- Book cover
- Author: David McDowall (author)
- Language: English
- Subject: History of the Kurdish people
- Genre: Non-fiction, history
- Publisher: I.B.Tauris
- Publication date: 1996 (original hardback edition)
- Publication place: United Kingdom
- Pages: 728pp. (2021 updated edition)
- ISBN: 978-0755600793
- Website: On Bloomsbury

A Modern History of the Kurds is a history of the Kurdish people, written by David McDowall and published by I.B.Tauris in 1996 (hardback first edition). The work is a history of the Kurdish people from the 19th century to the present.

== Academic journal reviews ==
- Allison, Christine (2 November 1997). "Reviewed work: A Modern History of the Kurds, David McDowall". Bulletin of the School of Oriental and African Studies, University of London. 60 (3): 569–570. doi:10.1017/S0041977X0003281X. JSTOR 619569. S2CID 162982851.
- Entessar, Nader (2 November 1997). "Reviewed work: A Modern History of the Kurds, David McDowall". International Journal of Middle East Studies. 29 (1): 153–155. doi:10.1017/S0020743800064400. JSTOR 163876. S2CID 162611827.
- Fawcett, Louise (2 November 2023). "Down but Not out? The Kurds in International Politics". Review of International Studies. 27 (1): 109–118. doi:10.1017/S0260210500011098. JSTOR 20079593. S2CID 146771496.
- Gunter, Michael M. (2 November 1996). "Reviewed work: A Modern History of the Kurds, David McDowall". Middle East Journal. 50 (4): 600–601. JSTOR 4328995.
- Gunter, Michael M. (2 November 1996). "Reviewed work: A Modern History of the Kurds, David McDowall". Turkish Studies Association Bulletin. 20 (1): 68–70. JSTOR 43384531.
- Karpat, Kemal H. (2 November 1998). "Reviewed work: A Modern History of the Kurds, David McDowall". The International History Review. 20 (4): 962–965. JSTOR 40108017.
- Klein, Janet (2 November 2023). "Reviewed work: A Modern History of the Kurds. Revised edition, David McDowall". The Turkish Studies Association Journal. 26 (2): 57–59. JSTOR 43383661.
- Kreyenbroek, Philip G. (2 November 1997). "Reviewed work: A Modern History of the Kurds, David McDowall". Journal of the Royal Asiatic Society. 7 (1): 139. doi:10.1017/S1356186300008476. JSTOR 25183311. S2CID 163610303.
- Olson, Robert (2 November 1996). "Reviewed work: A Modern History of the Kurds, David McDowall". Middle East Studies Association Bulletin. 30 (2): 196. doi:10.1017/S0026318400034167. JSTOR 23061901. S2CID 164882442.
- Quandt, William B. (2 November 1996). "Reviewed work: A Modern History of the Kurds, David McDowall". Foreign Affairs. 75 (4): 158–159. doi:10.2307/20047715. JSTOR 20047715. S2CID 129340739.
- Robins, Philip (2 November 1996). "Reviewed work: A Modern History of the Kurds., David McDowall". International Affairs. 72 (4): 853. doi:10.2307/2624227. JSTOR 2624227.

== Publication history ==
- 1996, original hardback edition
- 2001, paperback edition
- 2021, updated (4th) edition

== About the author ==
David McDowall is a historian and author, focusing on modern Middle Eastern studies.

== See also ==
- History of the Kurdish people
- Early Kurdish nationalism
- International Journal of Kurdish Studies
