= Pendro =

Kurdish village in Kurdistan

Pendro پێندرۆ
- Village
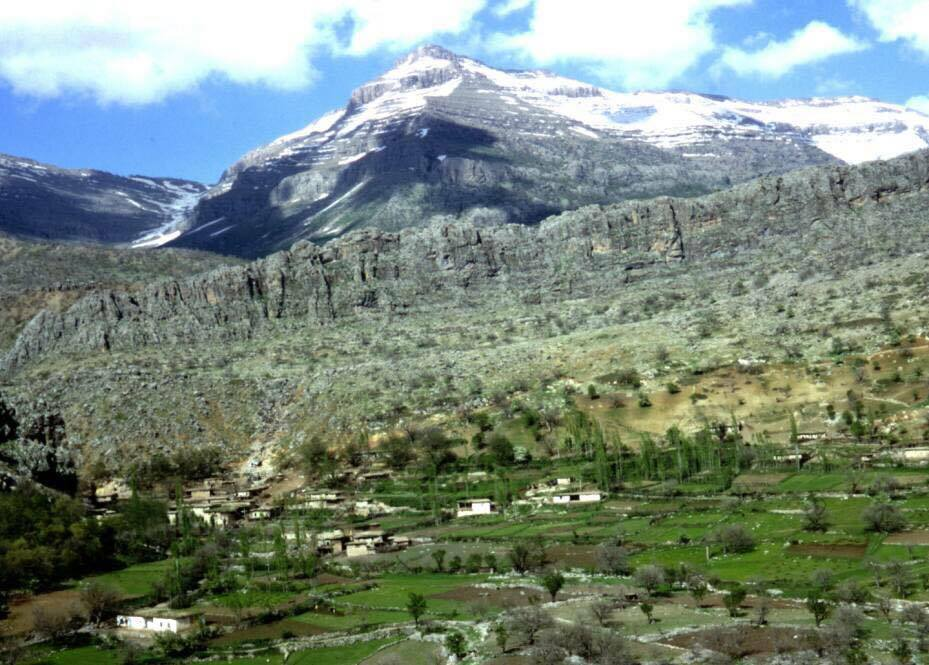
- Pendro in spring (1968)

- Location of Pendro within the Kurdistan Region Pendro (Iraq)
- Coordinates: 37.0680133°N 44.1064321°E
- Country: Iraq
- Region: Kurdistan Region
- Governorate: Erbil Governorate
- District: Mergasor
- Time zone: UTC+3 (Arabian Standard Time)

Pendro (Kurdish: پێندرۆ, romanized: Pêndro, Arabic: بيندرو) is a village in the Erbil Governorate of Kurdistan Region in Iraq. It is close to the border with Turkey and approximately 15–18 km to the north of Barzan. It is in the territory of the Muzuri tribe and Mount Butin is about 4 km northeast of Pendro. The area of Pendro covers over 10 km^{2} (4 sq mi). The terrain is highly mountainous, lying within the Zagros; less than 10% of the Pendro is below 1,225 m (4,019 ft), and its highest point is 2,534 m (8,314 ft).

== History ==
Pendro has located in the Mizuori region and the villagers were deported by Ba'athist Iraq in June 1978. Many Pendroi joined the first Barzan Revolt which ended in 1932 and Shaykh Ahmed Barzani was later forced to flee to Turkey with 400 Barzani families, this number includes 31 Pendroi families. One decade later in 1943 Mustafa Barzani was escape from his exile in Sulaymaniyah, he returned to Barzan and he had visited a number of villages in the region and a number of village men soon joined him and captured and disarmed the local police. A bloody clash between the Barzani and Military intelligence officers in Pendro, this clash that led to the death of the three Iraqi Military intelligence officers, that was the beginning of 1943 Barzani revolt. Occupation of Barzan on 7 October 1945 by Iraq, forced Barzani to order his forces to retreat from the region and cross into Iranian Kurdistan with nearly three thousands Barzani, 165 of them came from Pendro. And later settled and join establishing the Republic of Mahabad. After Mahabad Republic was overrun by Iran's army, Barzani and his 500 followers took refuge in the Soviet Union, including 19 Pendroi. During the Kurdish Rebellion some Pendroi families went back to Pendro and rebuilt new village in the north, toward to the mount Butin an area of the land called "Mlane", once again their village destroyed by Iraqi regime in 1987 and villagers forced to become refugees in Iran. In 1991, after Kurdish Uprisings, people came back to the village and it was rebuilt in 1994 by one of the British organizations. The new village rebuilt about 1.5 kilometres (1 mi) west of Pendro a region of the land called "Chema". But two years later the village destroyed during the PKK-Turkish conflict.

== Geography ==
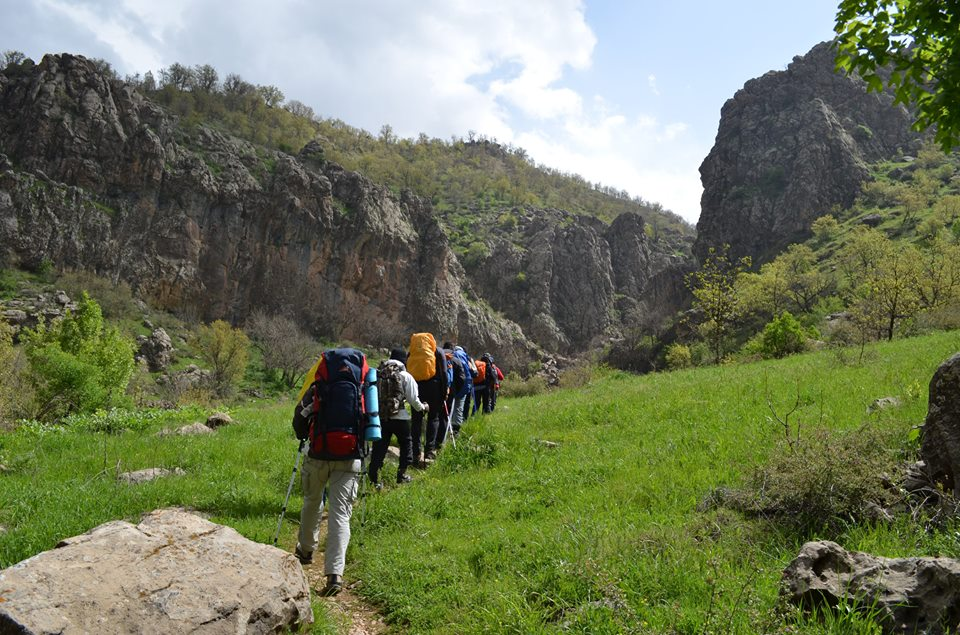
Kurdistan Mountain Climbing Federation Heading to the Sardav Canyon (2015)

Pendro lies at an altitude of 1,325 metres (4,347 ft) above sea level and covers an area over 10.0 square kilometres (3.9 sq mi). It is located in northern Kurdistan Region. The terrain mostly consists of mountains and hills, with very little moderately sloping plains. The lowest point is the Chema Stream, at 1174 metres, and the highest is Mount Butin, at 2,534 metres, in the Chema, just west of the confluence of the many Stream. Mountain ranges in the proximity of the village are Butin and Kerye Spindare, more to the south are Misek and Kore Hure. Pendro has neither rivers nor lakes. In terms of land boundaries, Pendro borders Edlbey, Zet, Banan, Shive, Dezo, Spindare, Navkorka, Binavye, Stope, Selke, Guiza Walati and Derek for over 50 kilometres (31 mi). The nearest major towns are Sherwan Mezin, 14 kilometres (9 mi) away to the south-east, Barzan, 18 kilometres (11 mi) away to the south and capital Erbil, 172 kilometres (107 mi) to the south (by road). The village-wide common lands called: Sebaski, Gure, Chema, Mlane, Butine, Elye, leri and Ser xingel. Pendro has so many springs the main springs are Kanya Gundi, Kanya Serderave, Kani Jefre, Kanya Mlane, Kanya Butine, Kanya Helara and Kanya Mira.

=== Climate ===
Pendro's climate is Hot/warm-summer humid continental (Dsa) according to Köppen climate classification, Weather in region is moderate especially in winter which is very cold and rainy (more than 1,500 mm (59 in) in some years) in addition to the fall of 150 cm (59 in) of snow annually. January is the wettest month.

Climate data for Pendro (2009–2016)
Month	Jan	Feb	Mar	Apr	May	Jun	Jul	Aug	Sep	Oct	Nov	Dec	Year
Record high °C (°F)	13.0 (55.4)	17.0 (62.6)	20.0 (68.0)	27.0 (80.6)	33.0 (91.4)	39.0 (102.2)	44.0 (111.2)	44.0 (111.2)	40.0 (104.0)	31.0 (87.8)	22.0 (71.6)	14.0 (57.2)	44.0 (111.2)
Mean daily maximum °C (°F)	9.5 (49.1)	12.2 (54.0)	16.2 (61.2)	23.0 (73.4)	29.6 (85.3)	36.7 (98.1)	41.0 (105.8)	40.7 (105.3)	35.2 (95.4)	27.5 (81.5)	18.8 (65.8)	12.2 (54.0)	25.2 (77.4)
Daily mean °C (°F)	6.1 (43.0)	8.5 (47.3)	11.7 (53.1)	18.0 (64.4)	25.6 (78.1)	31.7 (89.1)	35.3 (95.5)	34.7 (94.5)	29.1 (84.4)	22.3 (72.1)	14.6 (58.3)	7.1 (44.8)	20.4 (68.7)
Mean daily minimum °C (°F)	1.8 (35.2)	3.2 (37.8)	5.0 (41.0)	9.5 (49.1)	15.6 (60.1)	21.2 (70.2)	23.6 (74.5)	22.2 (72.0)	17.3 (63.1)	13.5 (56.3)	7.6 (45.7)	3.5 (38.3)	12.0 (53.6)
Record low °C (°F)	−9.0 (15.8)	−12.0 (10.4)	−2 (28)	10.0 (50.0)	14 (57)	20.0 (68.0)	22.0 (71.6)	20.0 (68.0)	14.0 (57.2)	9.0 (48.2)	−1.0 (30.2)	−5.0 (23.0)	−12.0 (10.4)
Average rainfall mm (inches)	155.1 (6.11)	91.0 (3.58)	143.6 (5.65)	89.1 (3.51)	51.0 (2.01)	2.9 (0.11)	1.5 (0.06)	1.3 (0.05)	3.9 (0.15)	53.9 (2.12)	85.0 (3.35)	141.6 (5.57)	819.9 (32.27)
Average snowfall cm (inches)	12.0 (4.7)	34.3 (13.5)	16.9 (6.7)	1.0 (0.4)	0.0 (0.0)	0.0 (0.0)	0.0 (0.0)	0.0 (0.0)	0.0 (0.0)	0.0 (0.0)	0.0 (0.0)	7.2 (2.8)	71.4 (28.1)
Average rainy days	12.3	10.5	14.8	12.5	10.7	3.7	0.5	1.5	2.3	8.5	9.8	11.1	98.2
Average snowy days	2.2	3.6	5.5	0.9	0.0	0.0	0.0	0.0	0.0	0.0	0.0	1.7	13.9
Average relative humidity (%)	64.8	60.8	58.8	51.5	37.3	22.8	18.6	18.7	24.7	36.8	47.8	59.2	41.8
Source 1: Worldweatheronline
Source 2: Accuweather

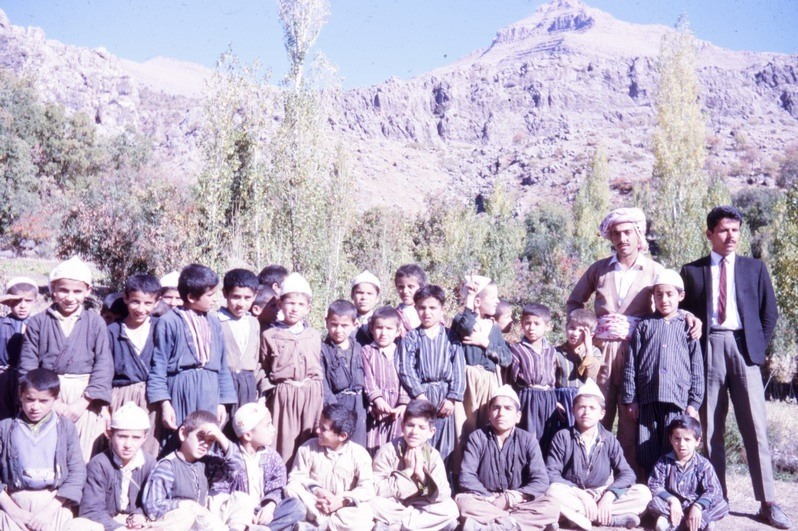
Pendro Elementary School students and teachers (1968)

== Wildlife ==
Environmental protection in Pendro and other parts of Barzani tribes began during the leadership of Khudan, he has banned the cutting of trees and hunting wild animals, especially wild goat and more progressive environmental protection had it start in the 1990s.

=== Flora ===
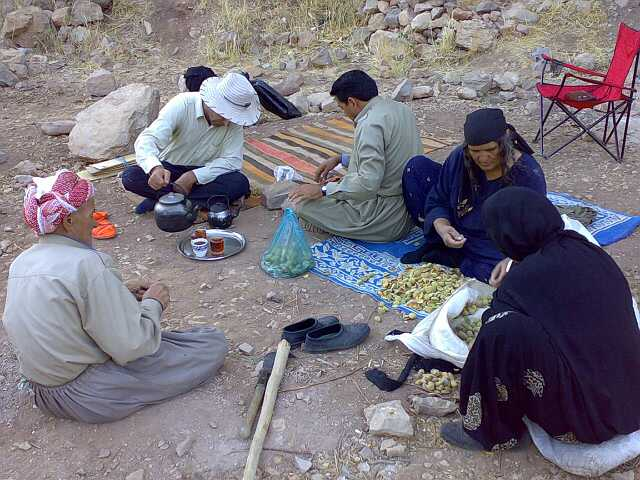
After harvest the villagers removing almond hulls, Pendro (2007)

Pendro has a hundred species of plants.
