= Mergasor District =

Mergasor District قەزای مێرگەسۆر Qezaya Mêrgesorê
- District
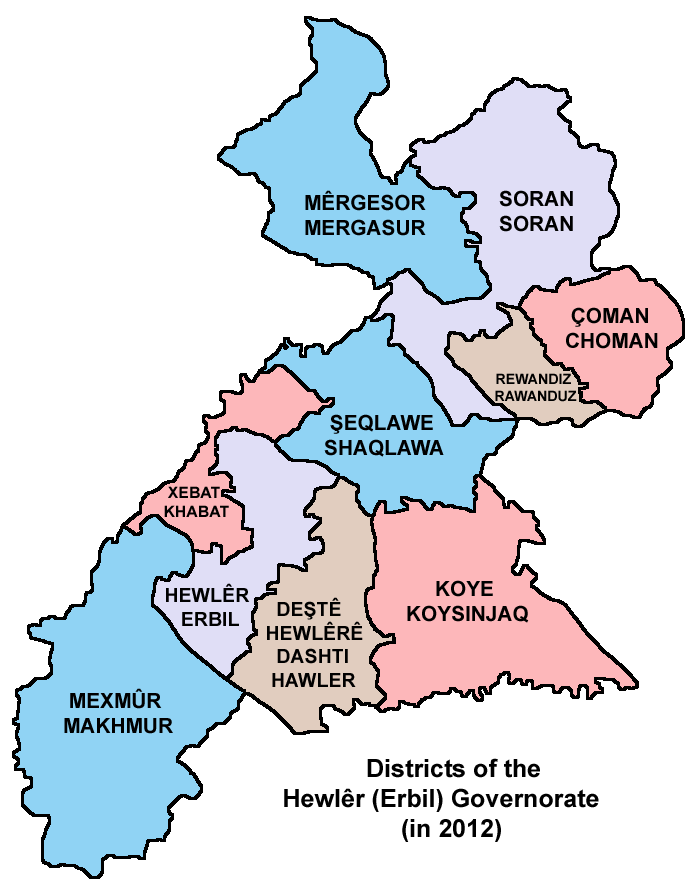
- Districts of Erbil Governorate (as of 2012)
- Country: Iraq
- Autonomous region: Kurdistan
- Governorate: Erbil Governorate
- Seat: Mergasor
- Time zone: UTC+3 (AST)

Mergasor District (Kurdish: قەزای مێرگەسۆر, romanized: Qezaya Mêrgesorê; Arabic: قضاء ميركسور) is a district in northern Erbil Governorate in Kurdistan Region.

== Geography ==
The district encompasses the five subdistricts Barzan, Goratu, Ble, Piran and Shirawan Mezn, with a total of 252 villages. It is located in the north of Erbil Governorate, close to the Iranian and Turkish borders.

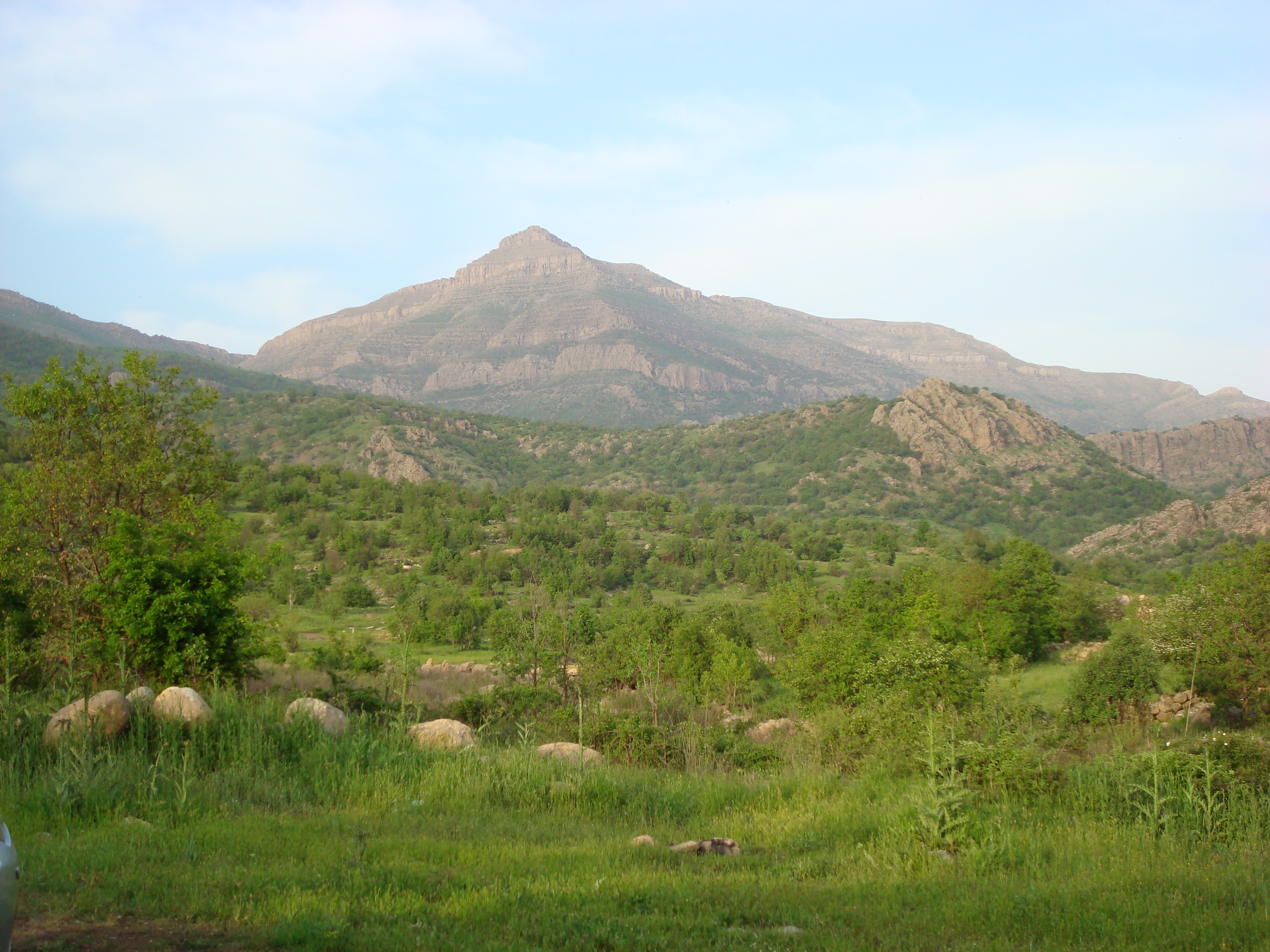
Mount Butin, Pendro

== Demographics ==
Mergasor District is populated by Barzani Kurds which consist of the Sherwani, Muzuri, Beroji, Nizari, Dolomari, Herki bneji and Gerdi tribes, Moreover, there is one Assyrian village named Bedyal. Religiously, the district is around 99.9% Muslim and 0.1% Christian.
