= Abd al-Salam Barzani =

Kurdish religious leader (1887–1914)

Sheikh Sheikh Abdulsalam Barzani
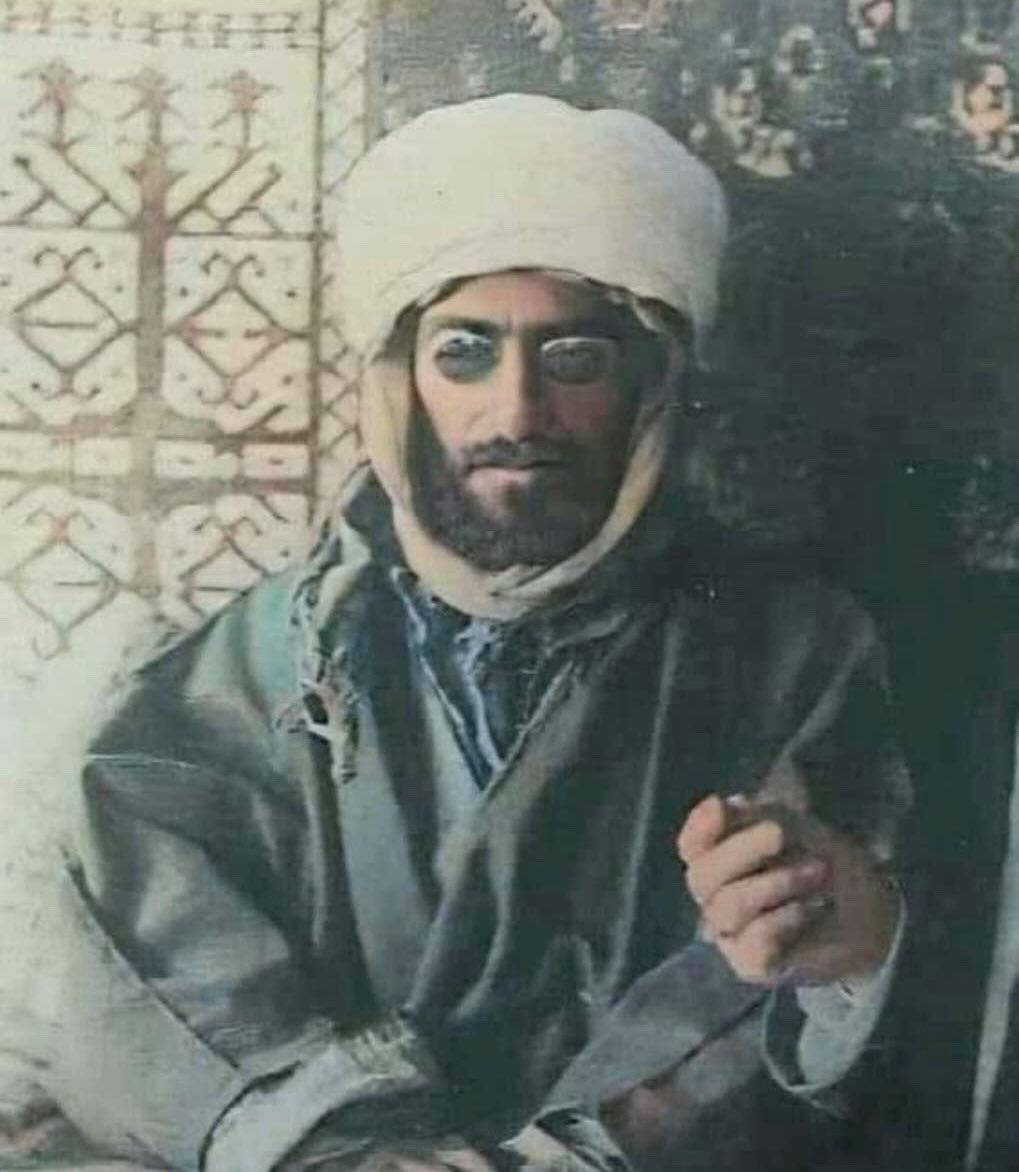
- Sheikh Abdulsalam Barzani 1914, Urmia in a meeting with the Russian Consulate
- Born: 1887; Barzan, Ottoman Empire
- Died: December 14, 1914 (aged 26–27); Mosul, Ottoman Empire
- Cause of death: Execution
- Relatives: Mustafa Barzani (brother); Ahmed Barzani (brother)
- Military career
- Allegiance: Kurdish nationalism
- Nickname: "The Sheikh of the Christians"
- Known for: Leading Kurdish resistance against the Young Turks and the Committee of Union and Progress
- Conflicts: Bitlis uprising (1907); Bitlis uprising (1914)

Sheikh Abdulsalam Barzani (born 1887 in Barzan, Ottoman Empire, died December 14, 1914, in Mosul) was a Kurdish rebel in the Ottoman Empire and a Khalidi sheikh.

== Biography ==
He was an associate of Sheikh Ubeydullah. His father was Sheikh Mohammed Barzani, and his grandfather was Sheikh Abdulsalam. He is the elder brother of Mustafa Barzani, Ahmed Barzani, Sheikh Mohammed Sadiq, and Sheikh Babo. Abdulsalam was also known as "the sheikh of the Christians" because of his tolerance towards the Assyrians.

Barzani's first uprising was against the Young Turks-CUP, who came into power after the Young Turk Revolution against Sultan Abdul Hamid II, and replaced Abdul Hamid's Pan-Islamist agenda with their own Turkish nationalist one.

A few months later, Sheikh Abdul Salam Barzani launched an uprising at the same time as the Bitlis uprising, supported by the Russian Empire. In 1910, the Ottoman forces left the Barzan area, where the uprising took place, and were able to suppress the uprising in Bitlis.

In 1913, he was arrested.

Mullah Mustafa Barzani was a young child with his mother when Abdulsalam was arrested. A year later, Sheikh Abdul Salam was released, gathered an army, and returned to fight. This time, Ottoman forces were defeated, and peace was accepted, leading to the release of other Kurdish rebels from prison.

Later, a man named Safut Beg from Barzan was accused of murder, and the region was once again surrounded by Ottoman government forces. After a period of fighting and the defeat of the rebels, Sheikh Abdulsalam was captured, taken to Mosul, and executed.
