= Bitlis uprising (1907) =

Kurdish uprising against the Ottoman Empire

Bitlis Uprising (1907)
Date	22 June – 30 July 1907
Location	Bitlis, Ottoman Empire
Result	Ottoman victory

Belligerents
Kurdish rebels	Ottoman Empire

The Bitlis uprising was a Kurdish uprising in Bitlis against the Ottoman Empire in 1907. The causes of the revolt laid in tensions between local Kurds and the governor of Bitlis following an earthquake in March earlier that year. It began on 22 June 1907, and lasted 38 days, before it was quelled by an Ottoman force on 30 July. Another uprising in Bitlis would break out in March 1914.
