= Ahmed Barzani revolt =

Kurdish uprising in 1931

- Part of the Kurdish–Iraqi conflict
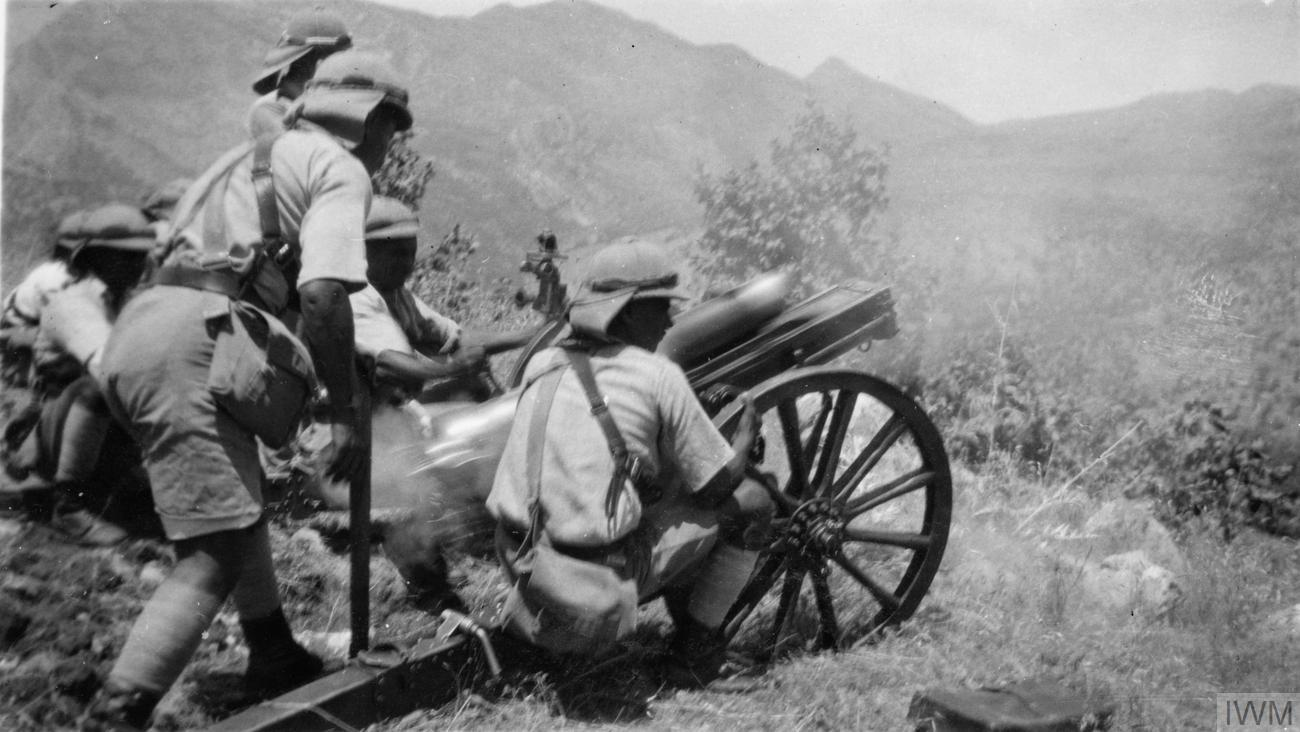
- Mountain gun of the Iraqi Army column, 'Dicol', shelling Shirwan-A-Mazin from a hillside at Kani-Ling during the Ahmed Barzani revolt, June 1932
| Date | 1931–1932 |
| Location | Northern Iraq |
| Result | Iraqi victory: Revolt suppressed; Barzanis retreat to underground; Low-level insurgency continues through 1933; Another revolt by the Barzanis erupts in 1943 |

Belligerents
| Iraq; United Kingdom; Assyrian Levies | Barzan tribe |

Commanders and leaders
| Faisal I Edgar Ludlow-Hewitt | Ahmed Barzani; Mustafa Barzani |

Units involved
| RAF Iraq Command | |

Ahmed Barzani revolt refers to the first of the major Barzani revolts and the third Kurdish nationalistic insurrection in modern Iraq. The revolt began in 1931, after Ahmed Barzani, one of the most prominent Kurdish leaders in southern Kurdistan, succeeded in unifying a number of other Kurdish tribes. The ambitious Kurdish leader enlisted a number of Kurdish leaders into the revolt, including his young brother Mustafa Barzani, who became one of the most notorious commanders during this revolt. The Barzani forces were eventually overpowered by the Iraqi Army with British support, forcing the leaders of Barzan to go underground.

Ahmed Barzani was later forced to flee to Turkey, where he was held in detention and then sent to exile in the south of Iraq.

== Background ==
=== Early Kurdish separatism ===
Shortly after the final accords of World War I, Sheykh Mahmud Barzanji of the Qadiriyyah order of Sufis, the most influential personality in southern Kurdistan, was appointed Governor of the former sanjak of Duhok. Sheikh Mahmud led the first Kurdish revolt in British-controlled southern Kurdistan (Iraqi Kurdistan) in May 1919.

After the Treaty of Sèvres, which settled some territories, Sulaymaniya still remained under direct control of the British High Commissioner. After the subsequent penetration of the Turkish "Özdemir" Detachment into the area, an attempt was made by the British to counter this by appointing Sheykh Mahmud, who was returned from his exile, as Governor once again, in September 1922.

Sheykh Mahmud revolted again and in November declared himself King of the Kingdom of Kurdistan. Members of his cabinet included Members of his cabinet included:

- Shaikh Qadir Hafeed – Prime Minister
- Abdulkarim Alaka – Finance Minister
- Ahmed Bagy Fatah Bag – Customs Minister
- Hajy Mala Saeed Karkukli – Justice Minister
- Hema Abdullah Agha – Labour Minister.

Barzanji was defeated by the British in July 1924. After the British government finally defeated Sheykh Mahmud, they signed Iraq over to King Faisal I and a new Arab-led government. In January 1926 the League of Nations gave the mandate over the territory to Mandatory Iraq, with the provision for special rights for Kurds.

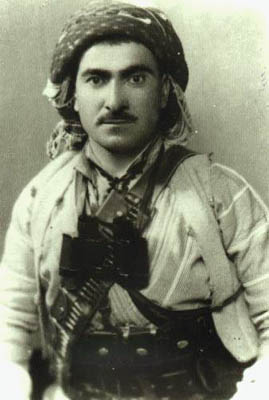
Young Mustafa Barzani during the 1931-32 revolt

== See also ==
- RAF Iraq Command
- List of modern conflicts in the Middle East
