= Piran, Iraq =

Town in Erbil Governorate, Kurdistan Region, Iraq

Piran پيراني
- Town
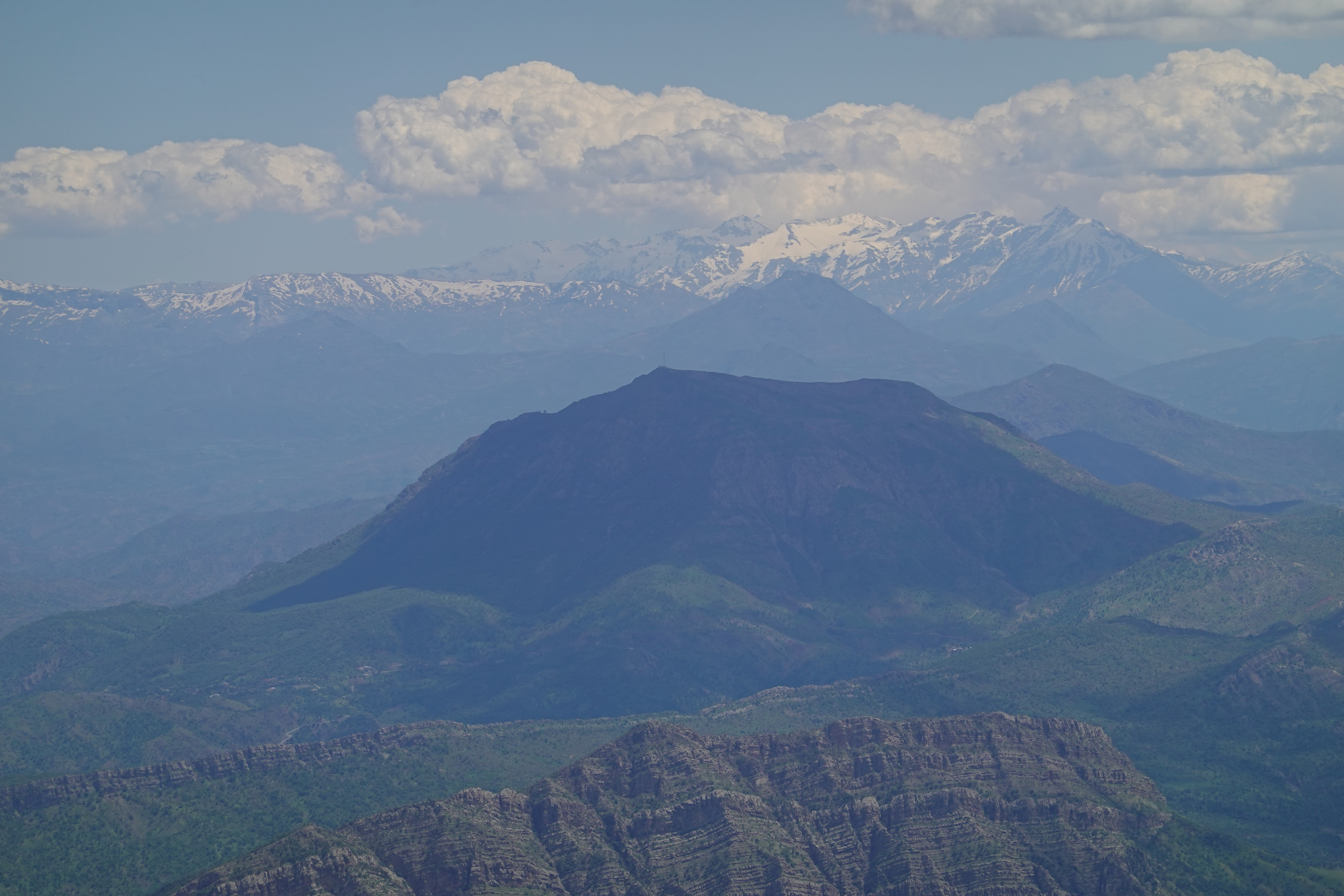
- Piran and Mount Piran seen from Kure Hure summit
- Interactive map of Piran
- Location of Piran in the Kurdistan Region Piran (Iraqi Kurdistan)
- Coordinates: 36.9060°N 44.3542°E
- Country: Iraq
- Region: Kurdistan Region
- Governorate: Erbil Governorate
- District: Mergasor District

Population
  - Total: 6,715
- Time zone: UTC+3 (AST)

Piran (Kurdish: پیران, Pîran) is a small town located in the northern part of Erbil Governorate in the Kurdistan Region, Iraq. It lies 22 km from Mergasor.
