= 1943 Barzani revolt =

Kurdish revolt in Iraq (1943-1945)

1943–1945 Barzani revolt
- Part of the Iraqi–Kurdish conflict
Date	1943 – October 1945
Location	Northern Iraq
Result	Iraqi victory: Revolt suppressed

Belligerents
Kingdom of Iraq	Barzani tribesmen Allied Kurdish tribes

Commanders and leaders
(Iraq) Prince Abdullah (Iraq) Nuri al-Said (Iraq) Hamdi al-Pachachi	Mustafa Barzani; Ahmed Barzani

Strength
Unknown	2,000 (1943); 3,000 (1945)

From 1943 to 1945, Mustafa Barzani led a Kurdish insurrection in the Kingdom of Iraq. He was joined by his older brother Ahmed, the leader of the previous Kurdish revolt in northern Iraq. The revolt was eventually put down by the Iraqi assault in late 1945, combined with the defection of a number of Kurdish tribes. As a result, the Barzanis retreated with much of their forces into Iranian Kurdistan, joining the local Kurdish elements in establishing the Republic of Mahabad.

== Background ==
The Ahmed Barzani revolt was the first of the major Barzani revolts and the third Kurdish nationalistic insurrection in northern Iraq. The revolt began in 1931, after Ahmed Barzani, one of the most prominent Kurdish leaders in Southern Kurdistan, succeeded in unifying a number of other Kurdish tribes. The ambitious Kurdish leader enlisted a number of Kurdish leaders into the revolt, including his young brother Mustafa Barzani, who became one of the most notable commanders during this revolt. The Barzan forces were eventually overpowered by the Iraqi Army with British support, forcing the leaders of Barzan to go underground.

== Aftermath ==
Following the failure of the Kurdish nation-state in Iran, Mustafa Barzani and his men retreated towards the Caucasus and eventually found refuge in the Soviet Union, where the Kurds were given sanctuary by the Soviets. Only in late 1950s, Mustafa Barzani would begin a process of reconciliation with the Iraqi government—which would, however, fail, and the Iraqi–Kurdish conflict would re-erupt into its most violent phase from 1961.

== See also ==
- Iraqi Kurdistan
- Kurds
- List of modern conflicts in the Middle East
