= Ahmed Barzani =

Kurdish tribe leader

Sheikh Ahmed Barzani
- ئه‌حمه‌د محه‌ممه‌د بارزانی
- Born: 1896; Barzan, Ottoman Empire (modern-day Iraq)
- Died: 1969 (aged 72–73); Barzan, Iraq
- Burial place: Barzan Village
- Children: Adham Barzani
- Military career
- Allegiance: Peshmerga
- Nicknames: Khudan; God of Barzan
- Known for: Leadership in Kurdish resistance movements
- Conflicts: Ahmed Barzani revolt

Ahmed Mohammad Barzani (1896 – 11 January 1969) (Kurdish: ئه‌حمه‌د محه‌ممه‌د بارزانی), also known as Khudan (Kurdish: خودان lit. 'Lord'), was a Kurdish religious leader and the head of the Barzani tribe. In 1927, he founded his own syncretic religion, in which he proclaimed divinity and was then nicknamed "the God of Barzan". He reportedly had an armed band of several hundred followers of the religion. He brought many different Kurdish tribes under his command. Along with his younger brother Mustafa Barzani, he fought against the Iraqi government in the 1920s and 1930s. By the time that Abdul-Karim Qasim came to power, Ahmed Barzani had reverted to Islam and was given an Islamic funeral after his death in 1969. Ahmed Barzani is considered to be the architect of Barzani rule in Iraqi Kurdistan.

== Religious views ==
As the Barzanis were traditionally led by an Islamic cleric, Ahmed Barzani was educated in Islam from a young age and was a qualified Sheikh. He was described as eccentric, "young and unstable", and "half mad", when he first became leader of the Barzanis, and his growing religious authority led to conflict, as controversies about his divinity quickly spread. By 1927, he created his own syncretic religion. He fused Islam, Christianity, and Judaism, as well as Kurdish mythology. He officially proclaimed divinity and was nicknamed "the God of Barzan". Nationalism may have had a role in his creation of a new religion. He allowed his disciples to proclaim him as the human incarnation of God, and he also allowed his followers to pray to him. Mustafa Barzani disassociated himself from the deification of Ahmed Barzani. During the 1920s, Sheikh Rashid led the Kurds of Baradust against Ahmad Barzani who he accused of religious heresy. A devotee of Ahmad Barzani, named Mulla Jug had claimed to be a prophet and that Ahmad Barzani was his God, he appeared to be an affective speaker and his preaching won him many followers. According to W.C.F Wilson, a British administrator in Iraq, Ahmad Barzani dominated the Barzan region with the aid of his brothers and an armed band of several hundred followers. In Wilsons words; “Up to that time the Quran had been revered, but now the Shaikh (Ahmad Barzani) issued orders for the destruction of all copies to be found. He also withdrew the ban on the eating of pork, for wild pigs were plentiful in Barzan. Armed missionaries were sent out beyond the Barzan bounds, and villages which refused to accept the Shaikh were burned and a number of the male inhabitants put to death.” This state of affairs could not be allowed to continue, and the Iraq Government was forced to take action in conjunction with the Royal Air Force.' In 1931, amid his revolt, some Western sources misinterpreted the Christian influence on his religion as him having converted to Christianity. By the time that Abdul-Karim Qasim came to power, Ahmed Barzani had reverted to Islam. He was given an Islamic funeral after his death in 1969, and was remembered as being a religious figure like Sheikh Said, Sheikh Ubeydullah, and Abdulsalam Barzani. His syncretic religion had never been popular among Kurds, and the Barzani family attempted to exclude it from the legacy of Ahmed Barzani.

== Battle with Assyrians ==
When Assyrians were returning to Hakkari, Ahmed Barzani and his Zibari allies tried to prevent the Assyrians from passing through their territory. The Assyrians led by Petros Elia defeated them and inflicted heavy losses but in the end he was able to expel the Assyrians from Barzan.

== Barzani revolts ==
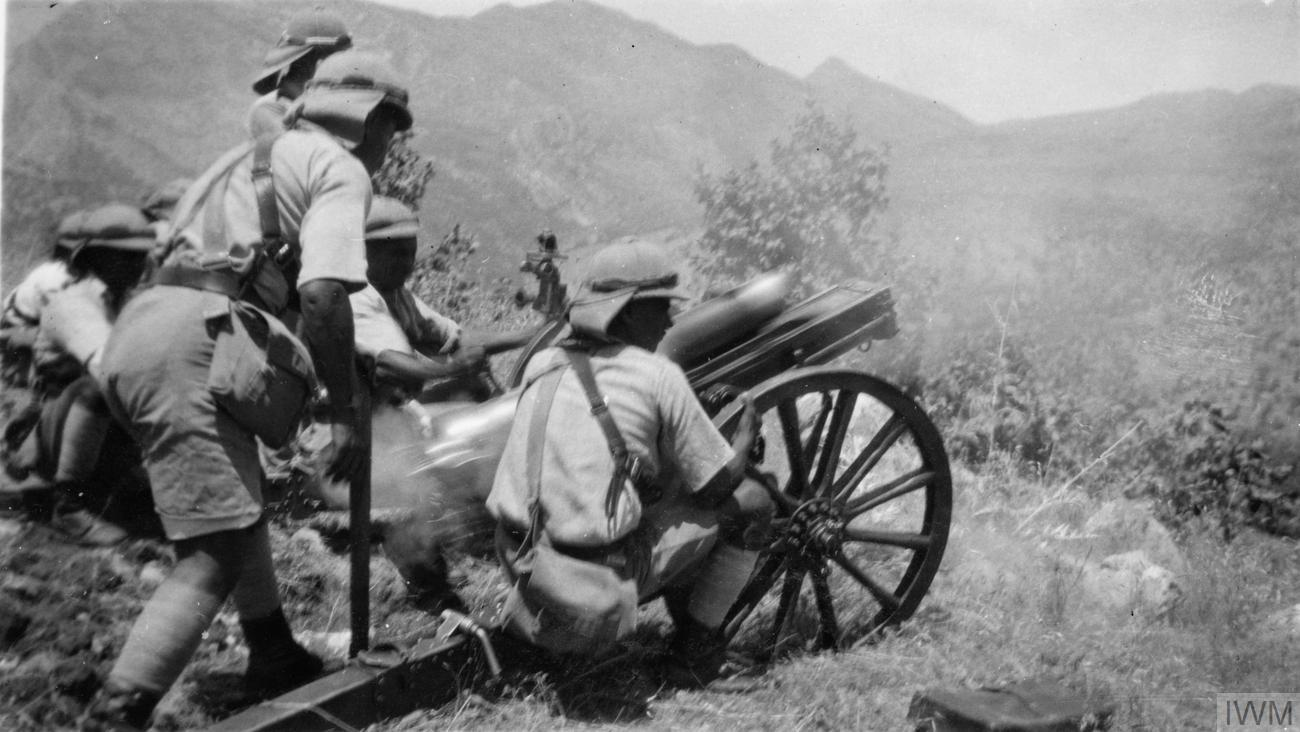
Mountain gun of the Iraqi Army column, 'Dicol', shelling Shirwan-A-Mazin from a hillside at Kani-Ling during the Barzani revolt, June 1932

The first of the major Barzani revolts took place in 1931 after Mustafa Barzani, one of the most prominent Kurdish leaders in Iraqi Kurdistan and the brother of Ahmed, succeeded in defeating a number of other Kurdish tribes who questioned their dominance.

He was later forced to flee to Turkey, where he was held in detention and then sent to exile in the south of Iraq. He headed Barzan's largest revolution from 1931 to 1937 and gained the respect of many Iraqi Army generals who were fighting him, such as General Abdul-Jabar Barznji the commander of Iraqi Army in Barzan region.

Barzani was the center of focus of the British, Iraqi and Turkish discontent. He was very sympathetic to Xoybûn, a Kurdish separatist movement that started the Ararat rebellion in Turkey. He received many Kurds who were seeking sanctuary in Barzan, including Kor Hussein Pasha. In September 1930, a Turkish military attaché in Baghdad told Iraq's Prime Minister Nuri Said, "the Turkish military operations in Ararat were very successful. The army will carry similar operations to the west of the Lake of Wan. We expect these operations to come to an end soon. The Turkish army will mobilize along the Iraq-Turkey border if the Iraqi Army moves against the Sheikh Barzan. In fact, Ismet Inonu complained to Nuri Said in Ankara that Sheikh Ahmed was supporting the insurrection in Ararat" (see Archive E4976/1932/93, dated 4SEP1930).

== Environmental protection ==
Barzani was the first known Kurdish environmentalist and conservationist leader. He enforced regulations to maintain a clean and sustainable environment. He prohibited, among other things:

- Cutting down trees, especially those which provide shade and prevent erosion
- Overharvesting honey
- Killing non-poisonous snakes.
- Fishing with dynamite and other explosives
- Hunting during breeding season.

== Barzani's legacy ==
Barzani rejected the traditional way of maintaining leadership within the same family. He emphasized that whoever takes the lead must be qualified for such a job. He condemned the corruption which was beginning to take part within the Kurdish Movement and was highly critical of ignoring the oppressed masses who were the victims of the movement's failures. He is also credited with emphasizing that marriage should be voluntary: such freedom he considered a basic civil right and stressed it publicly.
