= Bitlis uprising (1914) =

Kurdish revolt against the Ottoman Empire

- Bitlis uprising (1914) (Turkey)
Date	Early March – 4 April 1914
Location	Bitlis, Ottoman Empire
Result	Ottoman victory: Uprising suppressed

Belligerents
Kurdish rebels Supported by: Russian Empire	Ottoman Empire

Commanders and leaders
Mullah Selim; Sayyid Ali; Sheikh Şahabeddin; Abd al-Salam Barzani (executed); Simko Shikak	Unknown

Strength
Up to 8,000	Garrison at Bitlis: Unknown, but less than the Kurds; Reinforcements: Unknown

The Bitlis uprising (Note: Turkish: Bitlis Ayaklanması Kurdish: Şoreşa Bitlisê) was a Kurdish uprising in the Ottoman Empire in early 1914. It was supported by the Russian Empire. It was fought concurrently with an unrelated Kurdish uprising in Barzan in the Mosul Vilayet, which was also supported by Russia. Later Kurdish nationalist historiography portrayed the uprising as part of a Kurdish nationalist struggle, but its actual causes laid in opposition to conscription and taxation. The uprising began in early March, with a skirmish between Kurdish fighters and Ottoman gendarmes, where the latter was forced to retreat. The Kurds subsequently laid siege to the city of Bitlis, and captured the city on 2 April. Ottoman forces were then dispatched from Muş and Van and suppressed the uprising.

After the uprising was defeated on 4 April, Mulla Selim and several followers took refuge in the Russian consulate in Bitlis.The Russian ambassador refused Ottoman demands to hand them over, and they remained there until the Russian and Ottoman empires went to war in November 1914. Selim was executed after he was handed over.

== Notes ==
References
