= Muzuri (tribe) =

Kurdish tribal group

The Muzuri; مزووری (also spelled Mezuri, Missouri, Missuri, Musri, Mzuri or Mzwri) are a Kurdish tribal group inhabiting the northernmost areas of Iraqi Kurdistan.

== History ==
In the tribal register of Pîr Emer Qubeysî's Mişûr, one of the sacred Yazidi manuscripts that were composed in 13th-14th centuries, Muzuri tribe is mentioned as one of the tribes attributed as Mirîds of the Yazidi saint, Pîr Emer Qubeysî and his lineage.

Muzuris are also mentioned by Evliya Çelebi in his travelogue called the Seyahatname ("Book of Travel") in 1638, and mentioned by Mark Sykes in 1909, Also mentioned by the Kurdish historian Zaki in his book (Kurd and Kurdistan) in 1931. Mostly settled in Erbil and Dohuk provinces. Pendro is one of the largest villages inhabited by the Muzuri clan.
