= Mount Butin =

- Butin, Botin
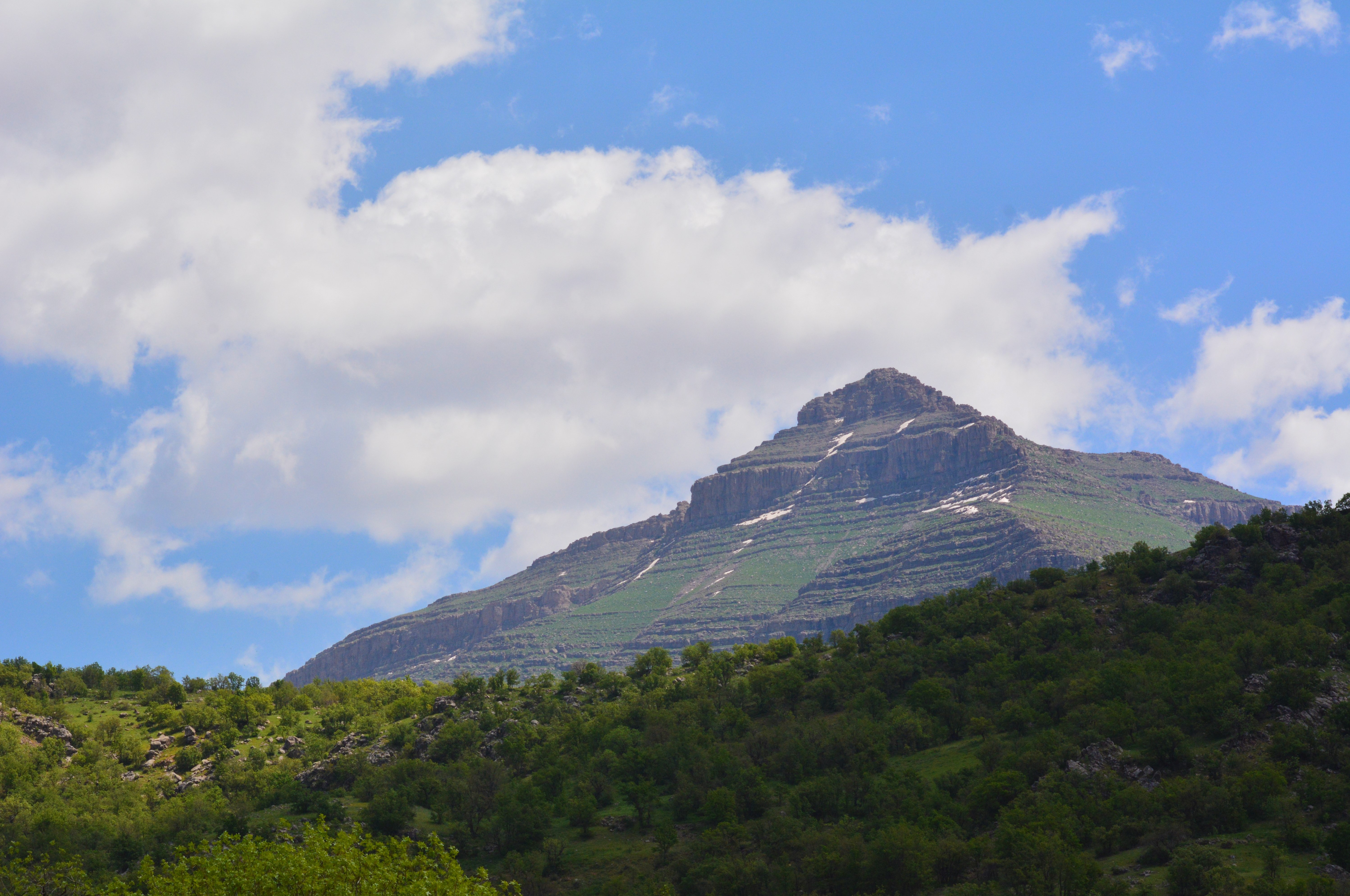
- Mount Butin in April 2016

Highest point
- Elevation: 2,534 m (8,314 ft)
- Coordinates: 37°04′40″N 44°09′21″E

Naming
- Nickname: Kurdish: بۆتین
- Native name: بۆتین (Kurdish); Bûtîn (Kurdish)

Geography
- Location within Iraqi Kurdistan Location within Iraq
- Location: Kurdistan Region, Iraq
- Country: Iraq
- Region: Kurdistan Region
- Mzuri Bala: Mzuri Bala
- Parent range: Zagros Mountains

Butin or Botin (Kurdish: بۆتین, Botîn) located on the Pendro terrain in Kurdistan Region. The mountain lies 4 km (2 mi) to the northeast of Pendro and some 100 km (62 mi) from Erbil. Hunting in Butin is prohibited and it is home to a large population of Wild Goat and other wildlife. Butin has a lot of valuable trees and mountain herbs, the most extensive growths on the Butin slopes.

== Photo gallery ==
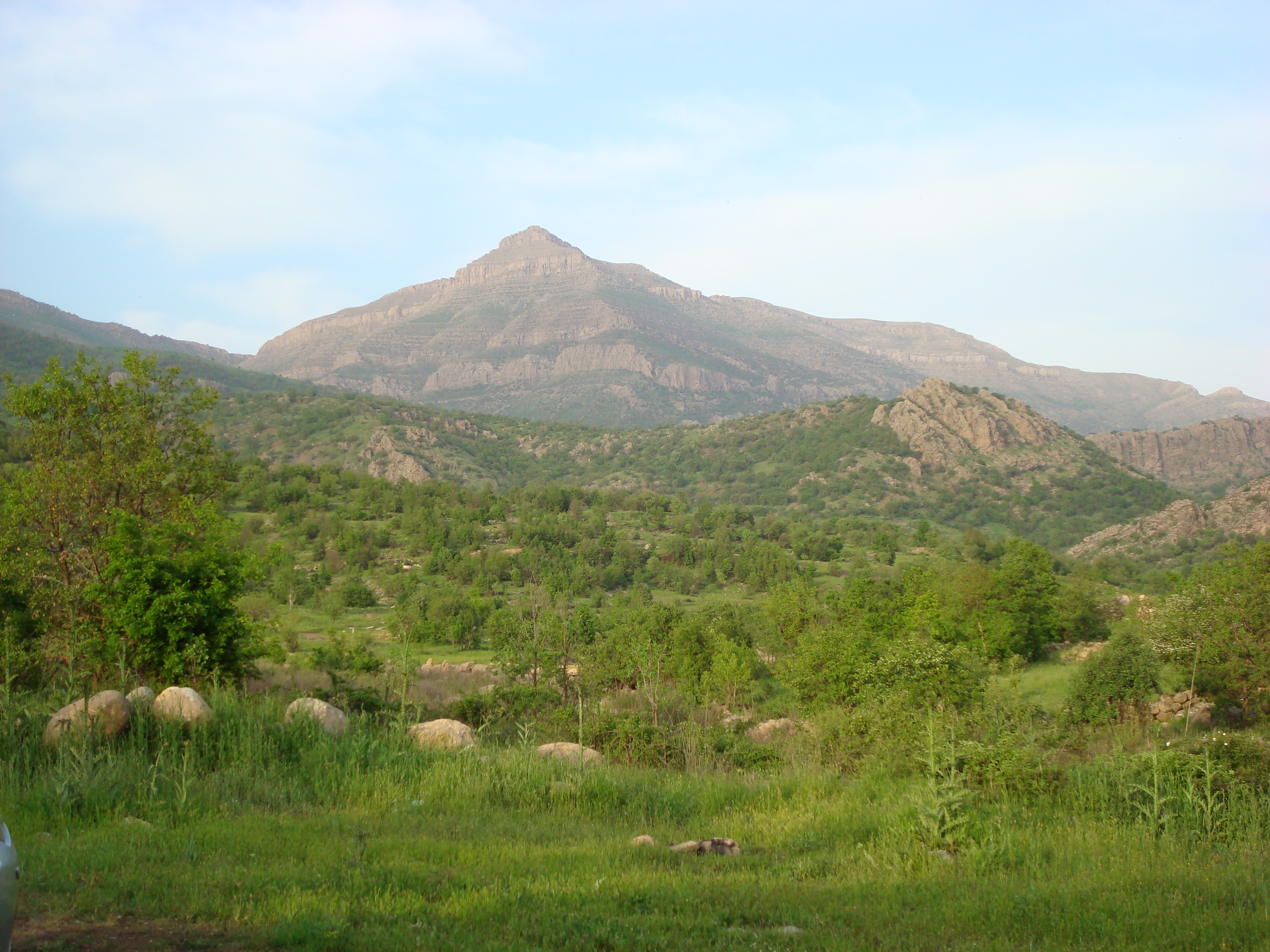
Mount Butin, captured on May 9, 2010

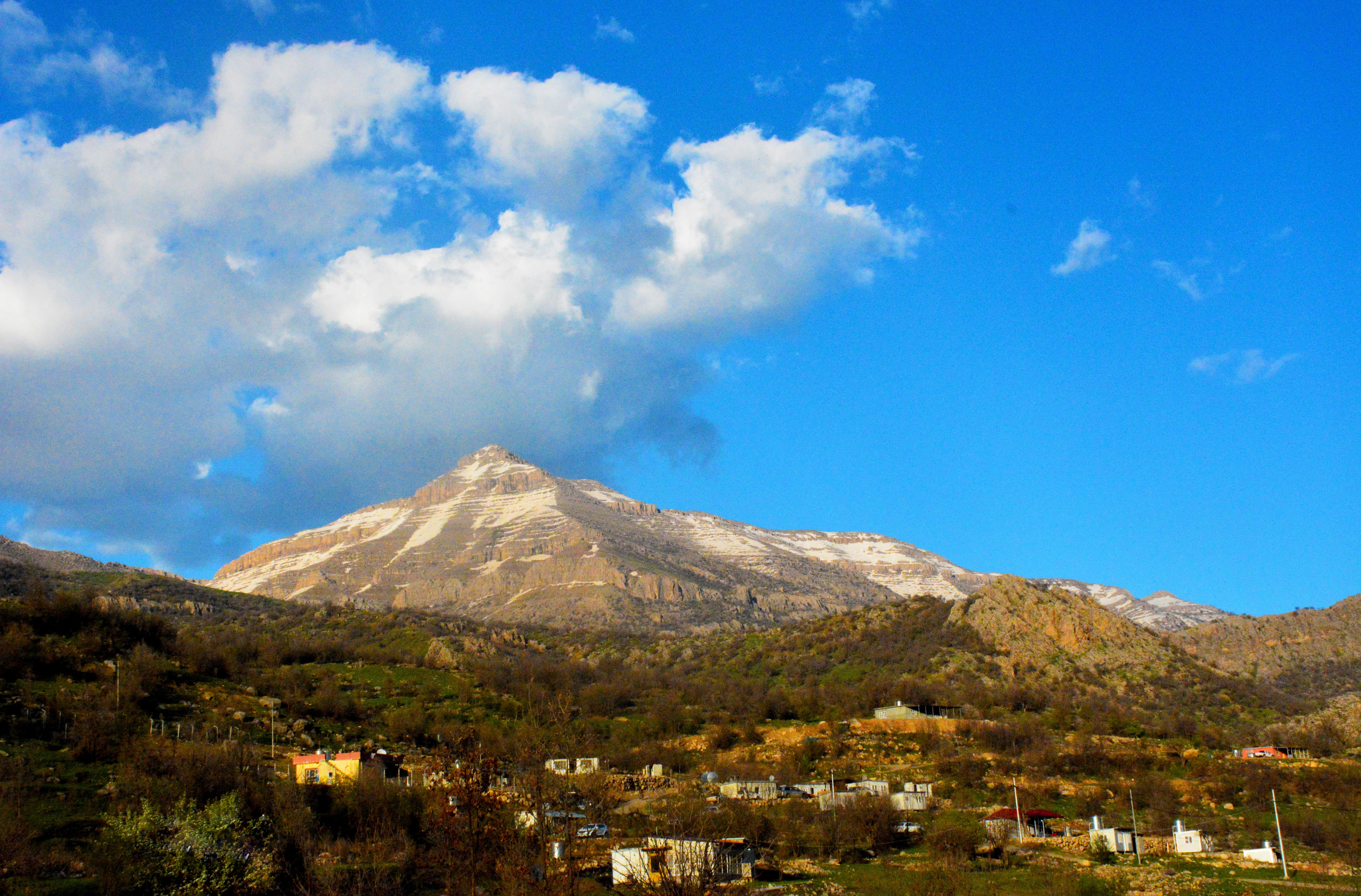
Mount Butin from Chemma, photographed on April 8, 2016

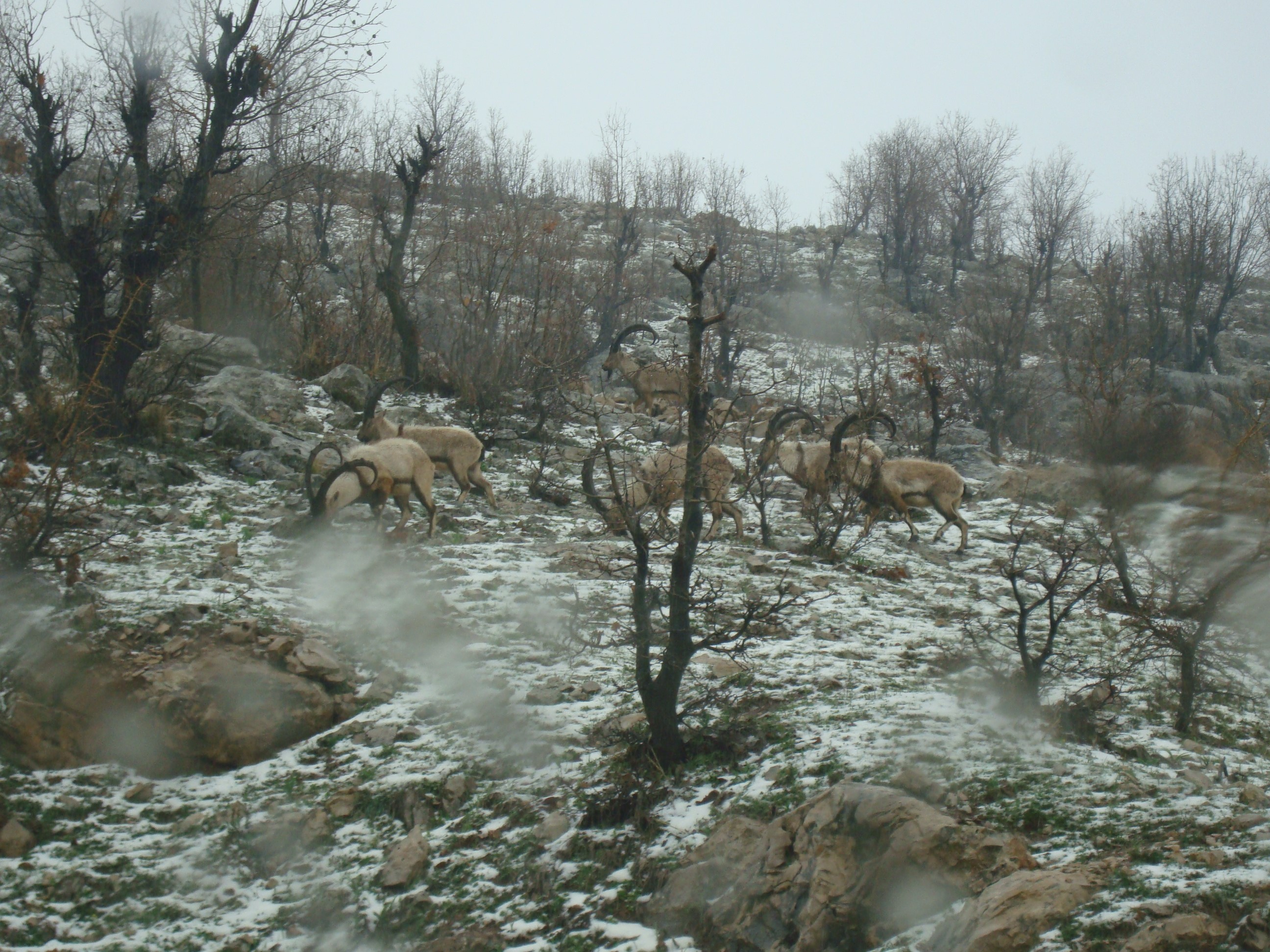
A wild goat spotted near Mount Butin

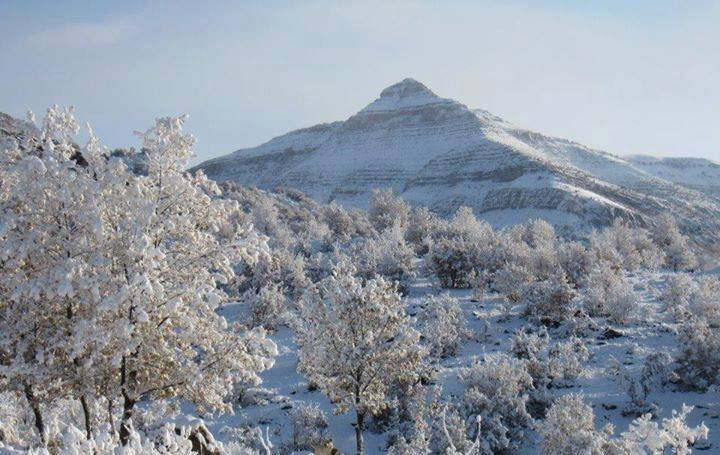
Mount Butin in winter, showing the snowy landscape

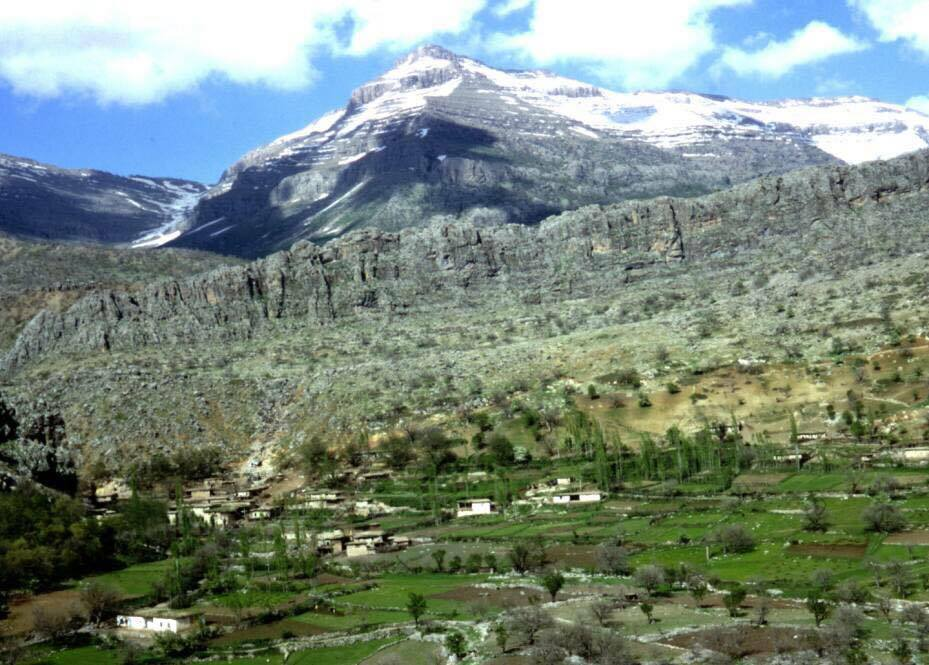
View of Pendro village with Mount Butin in the background

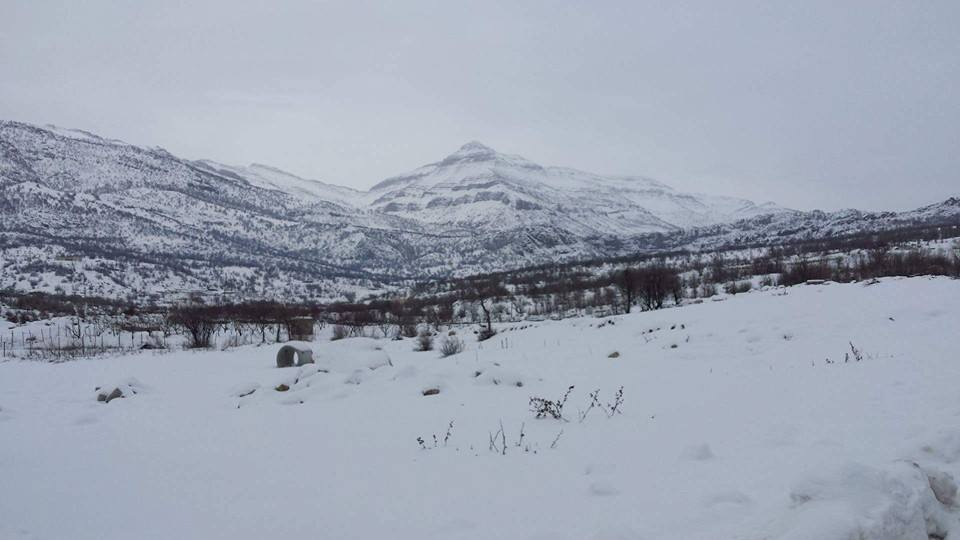
Winter view of Mount Butin from Chemma

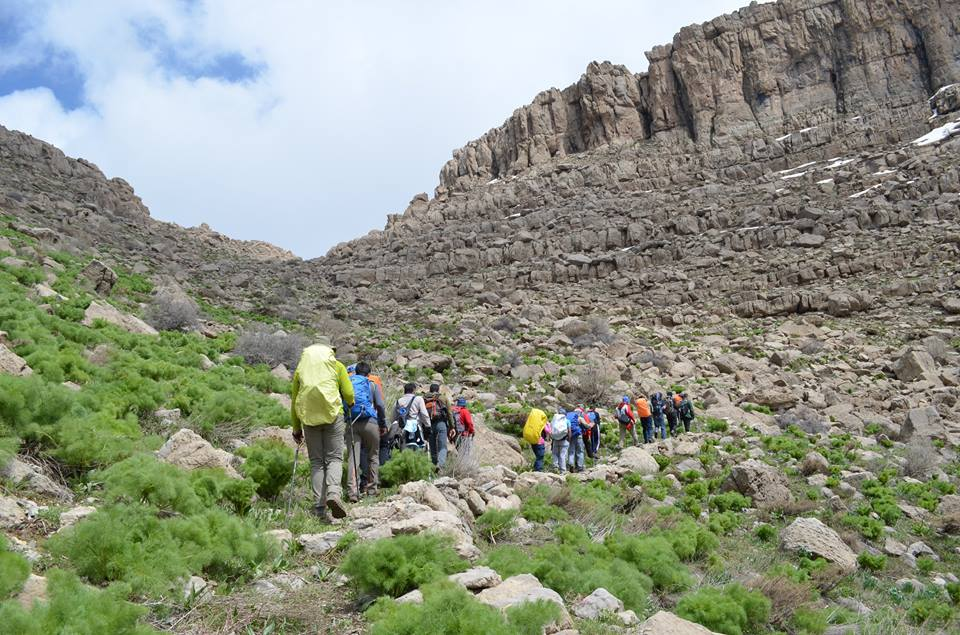
Members of the Kurdistan Mountain Climbing Federation, 2015

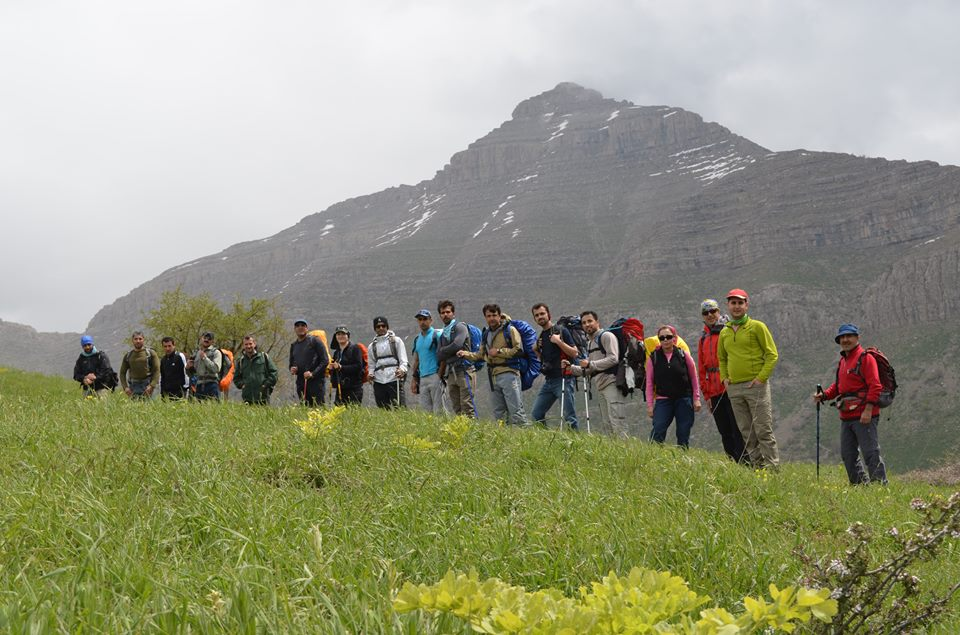
Another image of the Kurdistan Mountain Climbing Federation, 2015
