= Barzan, Iraq =

Village in Erbil Governorate, Kurdistan Region, Iraq

Barzan بارزان
- Village
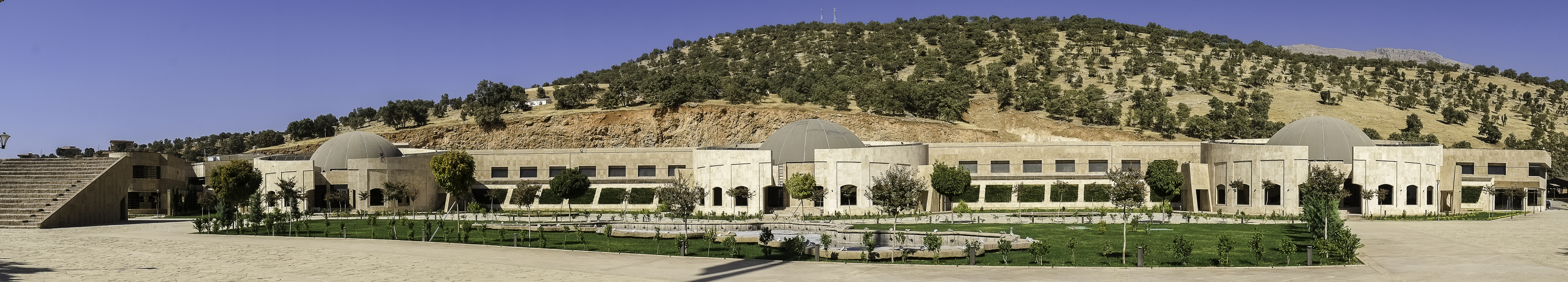
- Barzani Memorial Center
- Etymology: Possibly from Baziran, historical name under Badinan
- Interactive map of Barzan
- Location of Barzan in the Kurdistan Region Barzan (Iraqi Kurdistan)
- Coordinates: 36°54′54″N 44°2′31″E
- Country: Iraq
- Region: Kurdistan Region
- Governorate: Erbil
- District: Mergasor
- Time zone: UTC+3 (AST)

Barzan (Kurdish: بارزان, romanized: Barzan) is a Kurdish village situated on the northern banks of the Great Zab River, in the Erbil Governorate of the Kurdistan Region in Iraq.

== History ==
The village was formerly part of the territory of the Zêbari tribe and was included in Badinan, under the name Baziran. In the 19th century, the village became the residence of a Naqshbandi Sheikh and his followers, who are now known as the Barzani tribe.

In 1914, Barzan was the site of a Russian-supported Kurdish uprising led by Ebduselam Barzani against the Ottoman Empire, which occurred simultaneously with the Bitlis uprising.

In 1918, under the leadership of Agha Petros, the Assyrian volunteers stormed Barzan, and burned and looted the village.

The tribe was nominally autonomous from the Ottoman Empire until 1915, when the Ottomans stormed the village and hanged the local sheikh. In the early 20th century, the village had a conflict with the neighboring Bıradost tribe, which necessitated intervention from Iraqi authorities.

In 1943, local chieftain Mustafa Barzani revolted and quickly gathered support against Iraq; this would develop into the 1943 Barzani revolt.

== Climate ==
Barzan has a hot-summer Mediterranean climate (Csa) with hot, dry summers and cool, rainy winters. It is one of the rainiest cities in Iraq. Winter nights average below freezing most of the time, providing frost in the city. Snow occasionally occurs.

Climate data for Barzan
Month	Jan	Feb	Mar	Apr	May	Jun	Jul	Aug	Sep	Oct	Nov	Dec	Year
Mean daily maximum °C (°F)	9.0 (48.2)	10.5 (50.9)	14.7 (58.5)	20.6 (69.1)	27.8 (82.0)	34.5 (94.1)	38.7 (101.7)	38.8 (101.8)	34.8 (94.6)	27.4 (81.3)	17.9 (64.2)	10.9 (51.6)	23.8 (74.8)
Daily mean °C (°F)	4.3 (39.7)	5.5 (41.9)	9.4 (48.9)	14.8 (58.6)	21.1 (70.0)	26.9 (80.4)	30.9 (87.6)	30.8 (87.4)	26.6 (79.9)	20.0 (68.0)	12.3 (54.1)	6.3 (43.3)	17.4 (63.3)
Mean daily minimum °C (°F)	−0.3 (31.5)	−0.6 (30.9)	4.2 (39.6)	9.0 (48.2)	14.4 (57.9)	19.4 (66.9)	23.2 (73.8)	22.8 (73.0)	18.4 (65.1)	12.7 (54.9)	6.7 (44.1)	1.7 (35.1)	11.0 (51.8)
Average rainfall mm (inches)	151 (5.9)	172 (6.8)	150 (5.9)	114 (4.5)	37 (1.5)	1 (0.0)	0 (0)	0 (0)	1 (0.0)	19 (0.7)	88 (3.5)	106 (4.2)	839 (33)
Source: Climate-Data
