= Seyid Riza =

Alevi Zaza leader (1863–1937)

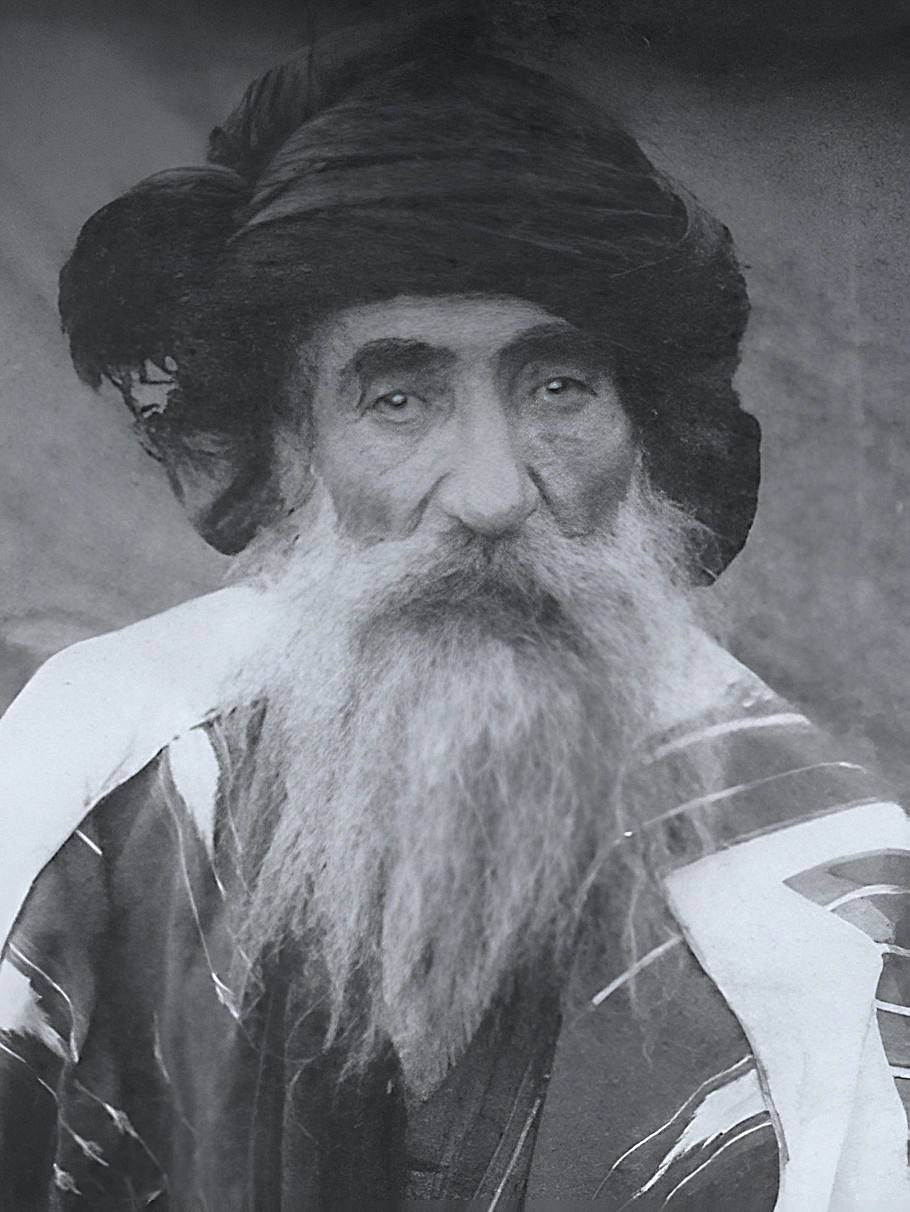
- Seyid Riza, before 1937
- Born: c. 1863; Lertik, Harput Vilayet, Ottoman Empire (present-day Ovacık, Tunceli)
- Died: 15 November 1937 (aged 74); Elazığ, Turkey
- Cause of death: Execution by hanging
- Occupation: Tribal leader
- Known for: Executed for being one of the leaders of the Dersim rebellion

Seyid Riza (Zaza: سەید ڕەزا, romanized: Seyîd Rîza, c. 1863 – 15 November 1937) was an Alevi Kurdish political leader of Dersim, a religious figure and the leader of the Dersim rebellion.

== Biography ==
Riza was born in Lirtik, a village in the Ovacık district, as the youngest of four sons of Seyid Ibrahim, leader of the Hesenan tribe. Seyid Riza succeeded his father as leader after Ibrahim's death in accordance with his will. During the First World War he led the tribe on the side of the Ottoman Empire against the Russians during their occupation of Eastern Anatolia and the Dersim region. He reportedly did not always comply with the demands placed upon him by the Ottomans, for instance refusing to hand over for deportation Armenians in his area of influence during the Armenian genocide. He also granted protection to the leaders of the Koçgiri rebellion. After the establishment of the Turkish Republic in 1923, Seyid Riza was a constant concern for the Turkish government as he remained largely autonomous and beyond the control of authorities in the Dersim region. Following the passing of the Resettlement law in 1934, and the Tunceli Law in 1935, Seyid Riza began to oppose the Turkish authorities. The Tunceli Law prescribed that the Dersim region would become Tunceli province and placed it under military control of the Fourth Inspectorate General by a military operation on the native people living there. During the Newroz festivities of March 1937, Seyid Riza called for a rebellion against the Turkish government. The rebellion was suppressed by the Turkish military by September of the same year. On September 12, 1937, he was arrested with seventy-two other rebels on their way to negotiations with the Turkish government.

== Trial and execution ==
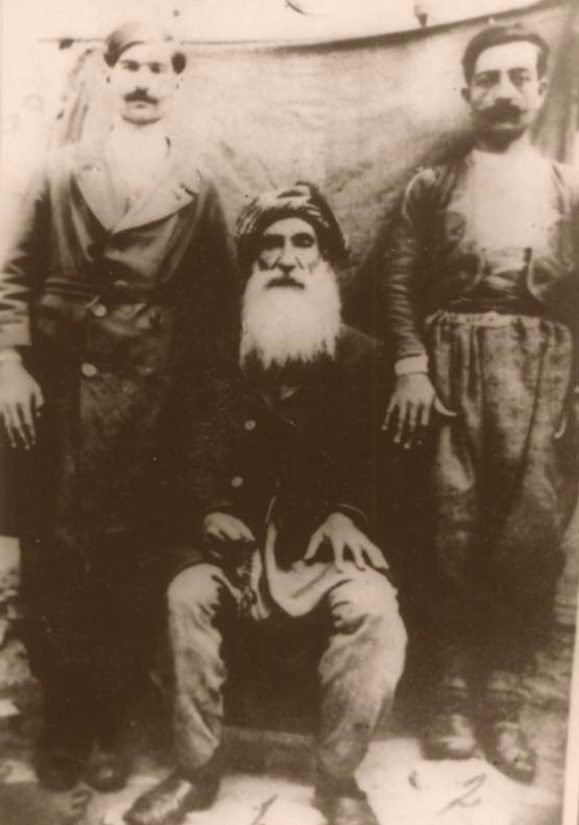
Seyid Riza

Seyid Riza was tried and sentenced after a trial that lasted two weeks and consisted of three hearings. The final sentence was passed on a Saturday, a highly unusual day for a court to be in session at that time. This abnormal course of events was due to Mustafa Atatürk's impending visit to the region and the local government's fear that the Turkish head of state would be petitioned to grant Riza amnesty. The chief judge of the court at first refused to render his final verdict on a Saturday, citing a lack of electricity at night and the absence of a hangman. After local authorities arranged to light the courtroom with automobile headlights and found a hangman, everything was set for the passing of the sentence. Eleven men, including Seyid Riza himself, his son Uşene Seyid, Aliye Mırze Sili, Cıvrail Ağa, Hesen Ağa, Fındık Ağa, Resik Hüseyin and Hesene İvraime Qıji were sentenced to death. Four death sentences were commuted to 30 years imprisonment. Seyid Riza was 74 years old when the sentence was announced making him legally ineligible to be executed by hanging. The court, however, accepted that he was 54, not 74. Riza did not understand his sentence until he saw the gallows. His final moments were witnessed by İhsan Sabri Çağlayangil:

'Seyid Riza understood the situation immediately when he saw the gallows. "You will hang me," he said. Then he turned to me and asked: "did you come from Ankara to hang me?" We exchanged glances. It was the first time I faced a man who was going to be hanged. He flashed a smile at me. The prosecutor asked whether he wanted to pray. He didn't. We asked for his last words. "I have forty liras and a watch. You will give them to my son." he said. We brought him to the square. It was cold and deserted. However, Seyid Riza addressed the silence and emptiness as though the square were full of people. "We are the sons of Karbala. We are blameless. It is shameful. It is cruel. It is murder!" he said. I had goosebumps. The old man walked briskly to the gallows and shoved the hangman out of the way. He put the rope around his neck and kicked the chair, executing himself. However, it is hard to feel sorry for a man who hanged a boy as young as his own son. When Seyid Riza was hanged his son's voice could be heard from the side: "I'll be your slave! I'll be your muse! Feel some pity for my youth, don't kill me!"'

== Aftermath ==
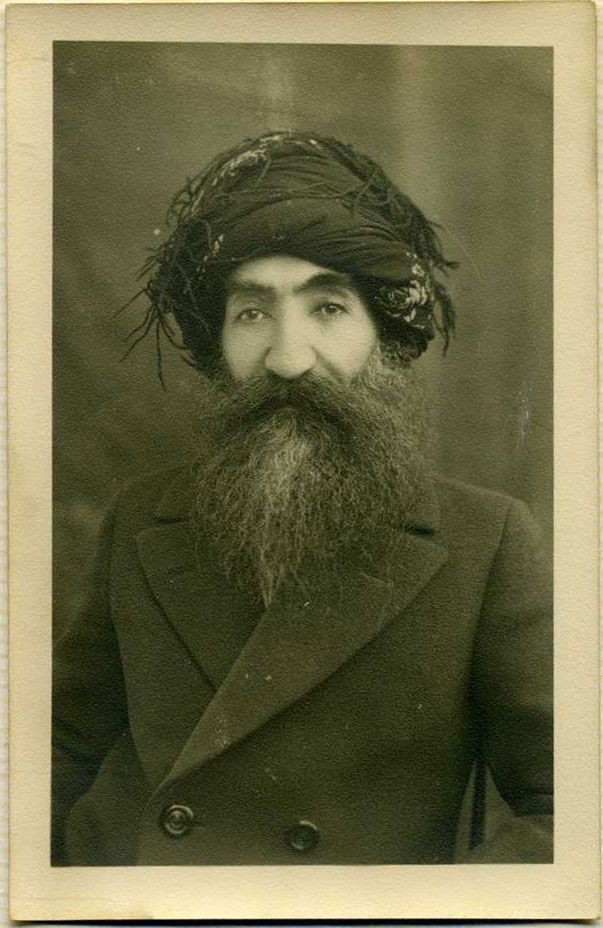
Seyid Riza

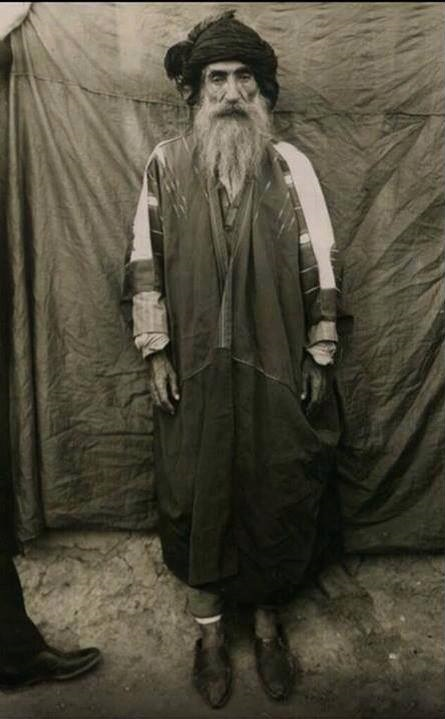
Seyid Riza

In a letter explaining the reason for the Dersim rebellion to British foreign secretary Anthony Eden, Seyid Riza is said to have written the following:

"The government has tried to assimilate the Kurdish people for years, oppressing them, banning publications in Kurdish, persecuting those who speak Kurdish, forcibly deporting people from fertile parts of Kurdistan to uncultivated areas of Anatolia where many have perished. The prisons are full of non-combatants, intellectuals are shot, hanged or exiled to remote places. Three million Kurds demand to live in freedom and peace in their own country."

A document, submitted to the Presidency with the signature of Minister of Interior Şükrü Kaya on 18 October 1937, states that this letter was in fact written, and signed, by a person named Yusuf in Syria.

It is indeed very likely that this letter was not sent by Seyid Riza but by Nuri Dersimi, a Kurdish nationalist revolutionary from Dersim who took refuge in Syria. The letter was written in a failed attempt to get support for the Kurdish nationalist cause from Western powers. Turkish authorities used the letter as evidence that Seyid Riza rebelled against the state but never proved that the letter was in fact written by him. English archives supposedly show that the letter was signed by Nuri Dersimi.

== His grave ==
Seyid Riza was buried in secret and the whereabouts of his grave remain unknown. There is an ongoing campaign to find the burial site. During a visit to Tunceli, president Abdullah Gül was asked to disclose the location of the grave where Seyid Riza and his companions were laid to rest after their execution. "This is not a difficult issue, it is in the state archives." said Hüseyin Aygün a lawmaker from Dersim/Tunceli, representing the province in Turkish parliament for opposition party CHP.

== Memorial ==
In 2010 a statue of Seyid Riza was erected at one of the entrances to Tunceli and the park around the statue was named after him.

== See also ==
- Human rights in Turkey
