= Edibe Şahin =

Turkish politician

Edibe Şahin (born 1960 in Nazımiye, Tunceli, Turkey) was the mayor of the municipality of Tunceli (Mamekiye), the capital of Tunceli Province in Eastern Anatolia, for the Democratic Society Party (DTP). She is of Kurdish Alevi origin.

== Early life and education ==
She was born in Nazımiye in 1960 and attended high school in Tunceli. Later she graduated from the Vocational School for Girls in Ağrı. She worked as a treasury clerk until in 1980 she went into exile, due to the political situation after the military coup. Even after an amnesty she did not return. Before returning to Turkey to stand for election, she worked for many years for women and human rights organizations.

== Political career ==
After joining the Democratic Society Party (DTP) she was involved in the female branch of the party. She was elected as Mayor of Tunceli in the local elections of 2009 for the DTP as one of two female mayors in the 81 provincial capitals. In 2010 she was sentenced to 10 months in prison by the Malatya 3rd Heavy Penal Court on charges of making propaganda for an illegal organisation. In the parliamentary elections of June 2015 she was elected as a Member of the Grand National Assembly of Turkey representing the Peoples Democratic Party (HDP) for Tunceli.

=== Political positions ===
She is for a stronger representation of women in politics, emphasized the role the DTP had in this furtherance. Regarding the atrocities against Kurds during the Dersim Rebellion she demanded the Turkish Government to open the archives. Elected mayor of Tunceli, Şahin campaigned against the construction of the Munzur Dam.

=== Imprisonment ===
In November 2016 Şahin was arrested in Tunceli over alleged links with the PKK. In December 2017 she was sentenced to 8 years and 9 months imprisonment. In prison she took up writing and contributed to Gültan Kisanak's book The Color Purple of Kurdish Politics.

== Personal life ==
Şahin is married with two children.
