= Tunceli Province =

Province of Turkey

- Province
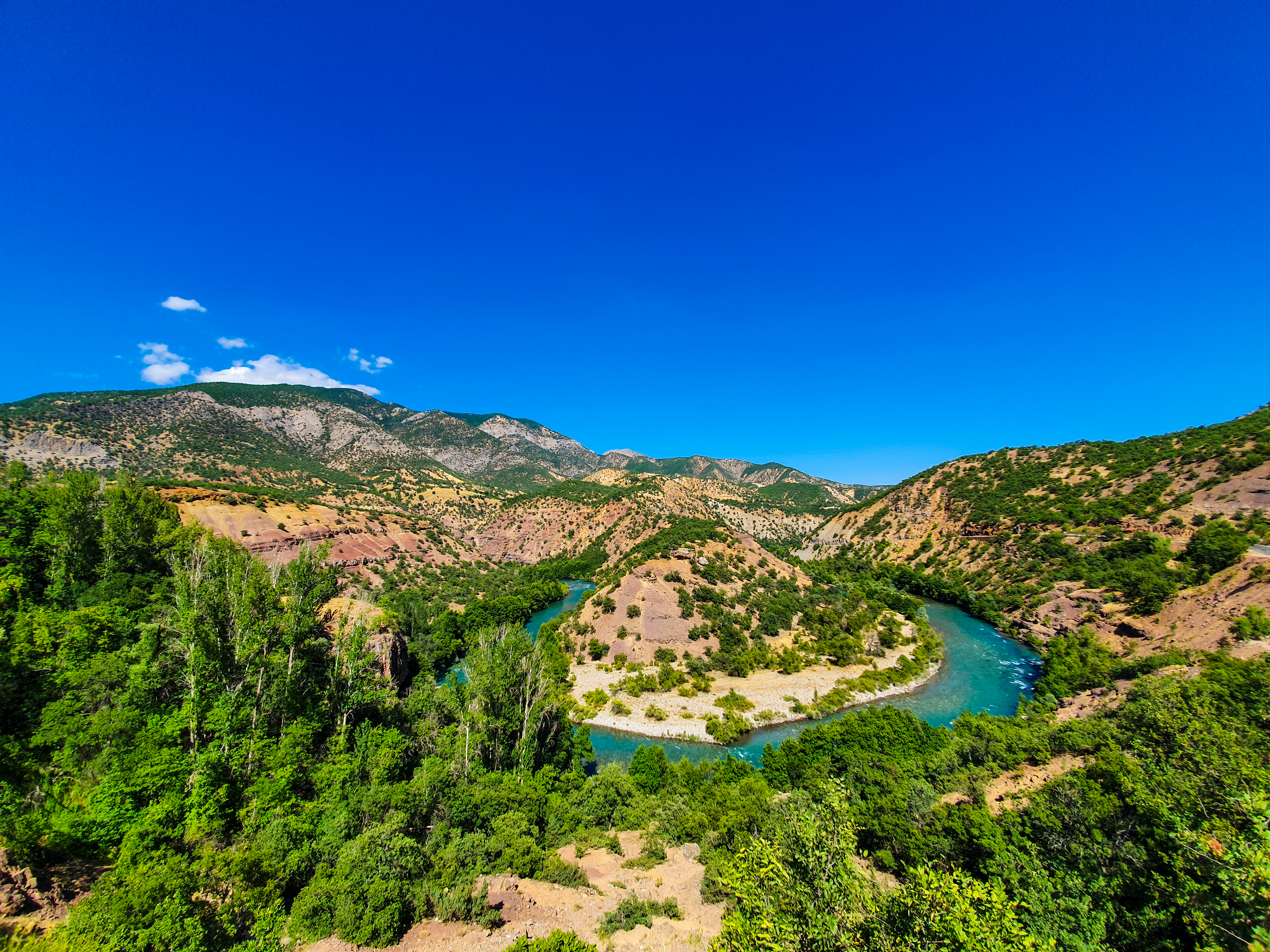
- The Munzur Valley National Park, with The Munzur River running through the province

- Location within Turkey
- Country: Turkey
- Established: 25 December 1935
- Seat: Tunceli

Government
  - Governor: Şefik Aygöl
- Area: 7,582 km^{2} (2,927 sq mi)
- Population (2023): 89,317
  - Density: 11.78/km^{2} (30.51/sq mi)
- Time zone: UTC+3 (TRT)
- Area code: 0428
- Website: www.tunceli.gov.tr

Tunceli Province (Turkish: Tunceli ili), formerly Dersim Province (Kurdish: Parêzgeha Dêrsim; Zazaki: Dêsim wilayet; Armenian: Տէրսիմի մարզ), is a province in the Eastern Anatolia region of Turkey. Its central city is Tunceli. The province has a Kurdish majority. Moreover, it is the only province in Turkey with an Alevi majority. The province has eight municipalities, 366 villages and 1,087 hamlets.

== History ==
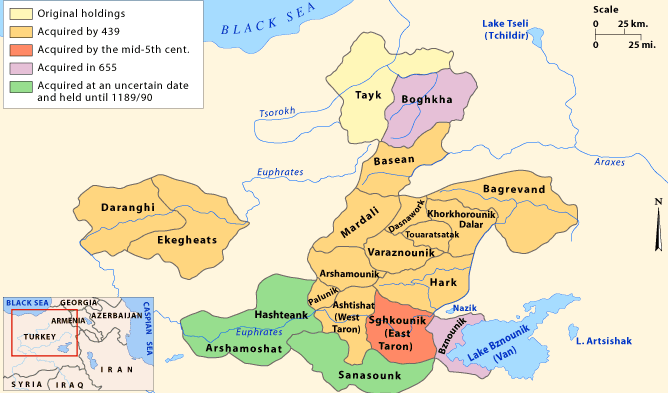
The Armenian district of Daranaghi (partly corresponding with Tunceli province) shown as a part of the holdings of the Mamikonian dynasty

=== Bronze Age ===
This region was known as Ishuva in the 2000s BC. As a result of the struggle of the Ishuva Kingdom, which was established by the Hurrians in the region, with the Hittites, the region came under the rule of the Hittites in the 1600s BC.

=== Iron Age ===
Then, it came under the domination of the Urartians and formed the westernmost part of the country of Urartu. After that, it was ruled by Medes and the Persian Achaemenid Empire, and after that it was ruled by Alexander the Great, king of Macedon.

=== Ottoman Empire rule ===
Although the presence of Ottoman Empire was beginning to be felt in the region after Mehmed II the Conqueror defeated the Aq Qoyunlu in 1473, its incorporation into Ottoman lands took place after the Battle of Chaldiran in 1514, during the reign of Selim the Grim. However, the harsh and rugged geographical structure of the region helped preserved its autonomy, keeping the control of the region away from the centralized government. The people of Dersim displayed rebellious attitudes during the weak periods of the central administrations. Various Armenian and Alevi Kurdish rebellions took place in the region in 1877, 1885, 1892, 1907, 1911, 1914 and 1916.

=== In Turkey ===
With the abolition of the Ottoman Empire, Turkey became the owner of the region. It was originally named Dersim Province (Dersim vilayeti), then demoted to a district (Dersim kazası) and incorporated into Elazığ Province in 1926. In 1935, the Tunceli Law was passed, which established a state of emergency in the region, changed its name to Tunceli and made it a separate province consisting of the Nazımiye, Hozat, Mazgirt, Pertek, Ovacık, and Çemişgezek districts of Elazığ Province and the Pülümür District of Erzincan Province. In January 1936, the Fourth Inspectorate-General (Umumi Müfettişlik, UM) was created, which spanned the provinces of Elazığ, Erzincan, Bingöl and Tunceli and was governed by a Governor-Commander, who had the authority to evacuate whole villages and resettle them in other regions. This effectively established military rule in those provinces, and significant military infrastructure was established in the region. Judicial guarantees such as the right to appeal were suspended, and the Governor-Commander had the right to apply the death penalty, whereas normally this would have to be approved by the Grand National Assembly of Turkey. In 1937–1938, the Dersim massacre took place in Tunceli Province and the adjacent regions, which resulted in the massacre of 30,000 Kurds and displacement of tens of thousands of inhabitants of the region by Turkish forces. In 1946 the Tunceli Law was abolished and the state of emergency removed but the authority of the Fourth UM was transferred to the military. Some of the deported families were allowed to return home. The Inspectorates-General were dissolved in 1952 during the government of the Democrat Party.

Since the 1970s, Tunceli Province has been a stronghold for groups such as the Communist Party of Turkey/Marxist–Leninist and the Kurdistan Workers' Party.

==== Name changes ====
Before and after the Dersim massacre, any villages and towns deemed to have non-Turkish names were renamed and given Turkish names in order to suppress any non-Turkish heritage. During the Turkish Republican era, the words Kurdistan and Kurds were banned. The Turkish government had disguised the presence of the Kurds statistically by categorizing them as Mountain Turks.

Linguist Sevan Nişanyan estimates that 4,000 Kurdish geographical locations have been changed (both Zazaki and Kurmanji). Prior to the name changes, Many villages in Tunceli had recognizably Armenian names, often in corrupted forms. The people of Tunceli have been actively fighting to get their province reverted to its old Kurdish name "Dersim". Turkey's ruling Justice and Development Party (AK Party) claimed they are working on what it called a “democratization package” that includes the restoration of the Kurdish name of the eastern province of Tunceli back to Dersim in early 2013, but there has been no updates or news of it since then. The local authority decided to call it Dersim in May 2019, while the Governor said it was against the law to call it Dersim.

Topographic map of Tunceli Province

== Geography ==
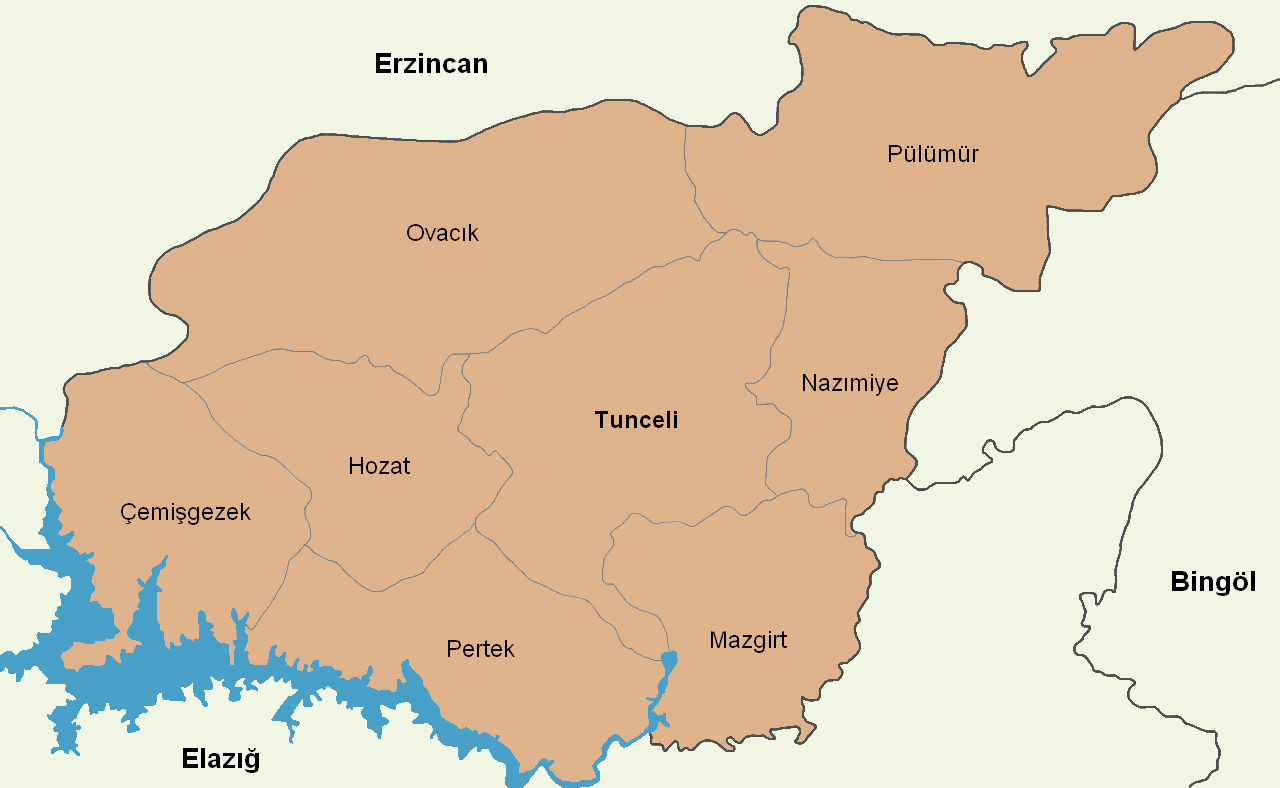
Districts of the province

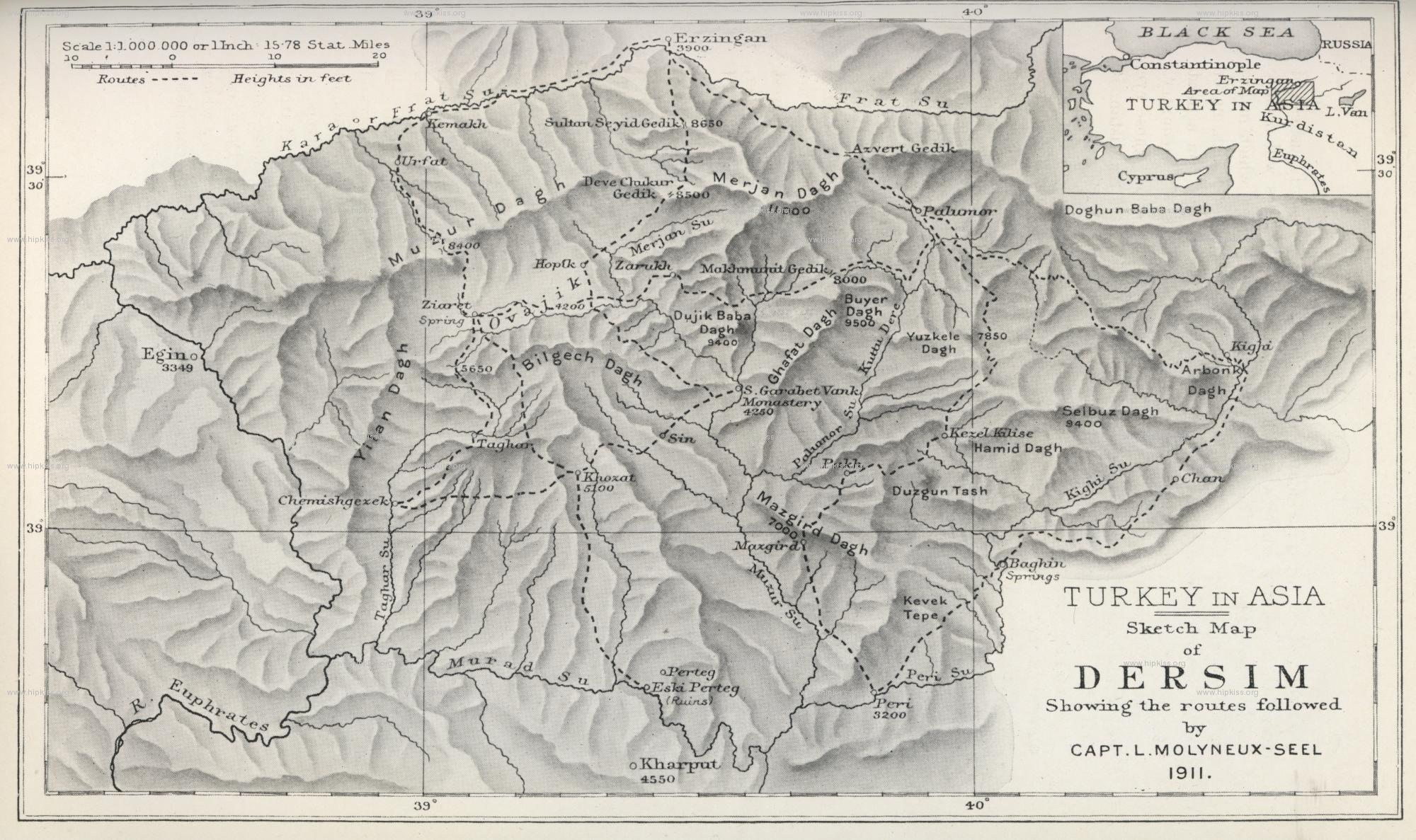
A map of Dersim by the British Vice-Consul in Van, L. Molyneux-Seel, 1911

The adjacent provinces are Erzincan to the north and west, Elazığ to the south, and Bingöl to the east. The province covers an area of 7,582 km^{2} (2,927 sq mi). Tunceli is traversed by the northeasterly line of equal latitude and longitude. Munzur Valley National Park in the Munzur Mountains is also located in the province. Karagöl Lake is one of the largest lakes in Tunceli province. Others are Lake Çinili and Lake Baraların.

Tunceli Province is a plateau characterized by its high, thickly forested mountain ranges. The historical region of Dersim, which largely corresponds to Tunceli Province, lies roughly between the Karasu and Murat rivers, both tributaries of the Euphrates.

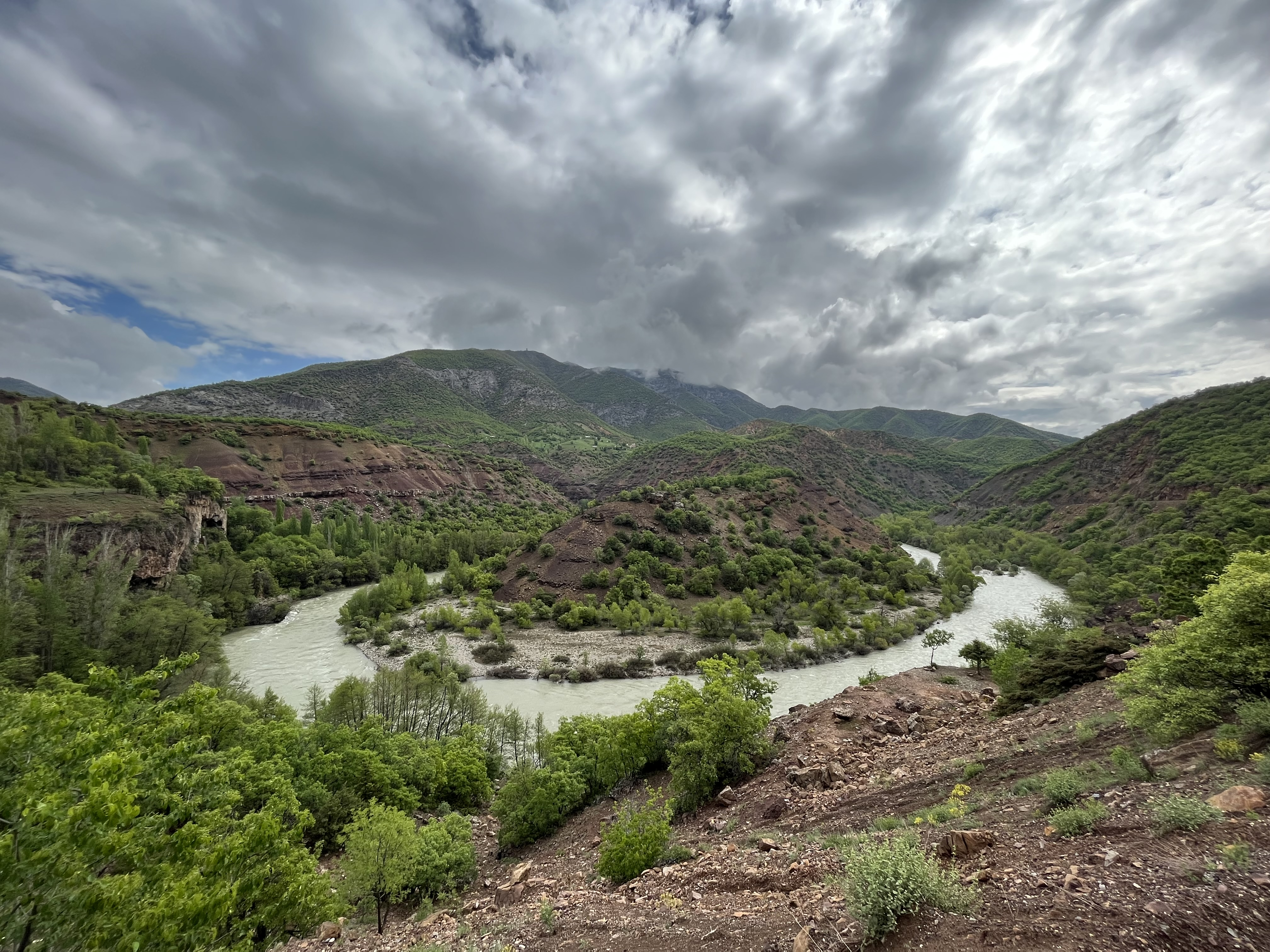
Munzur Valley National Park

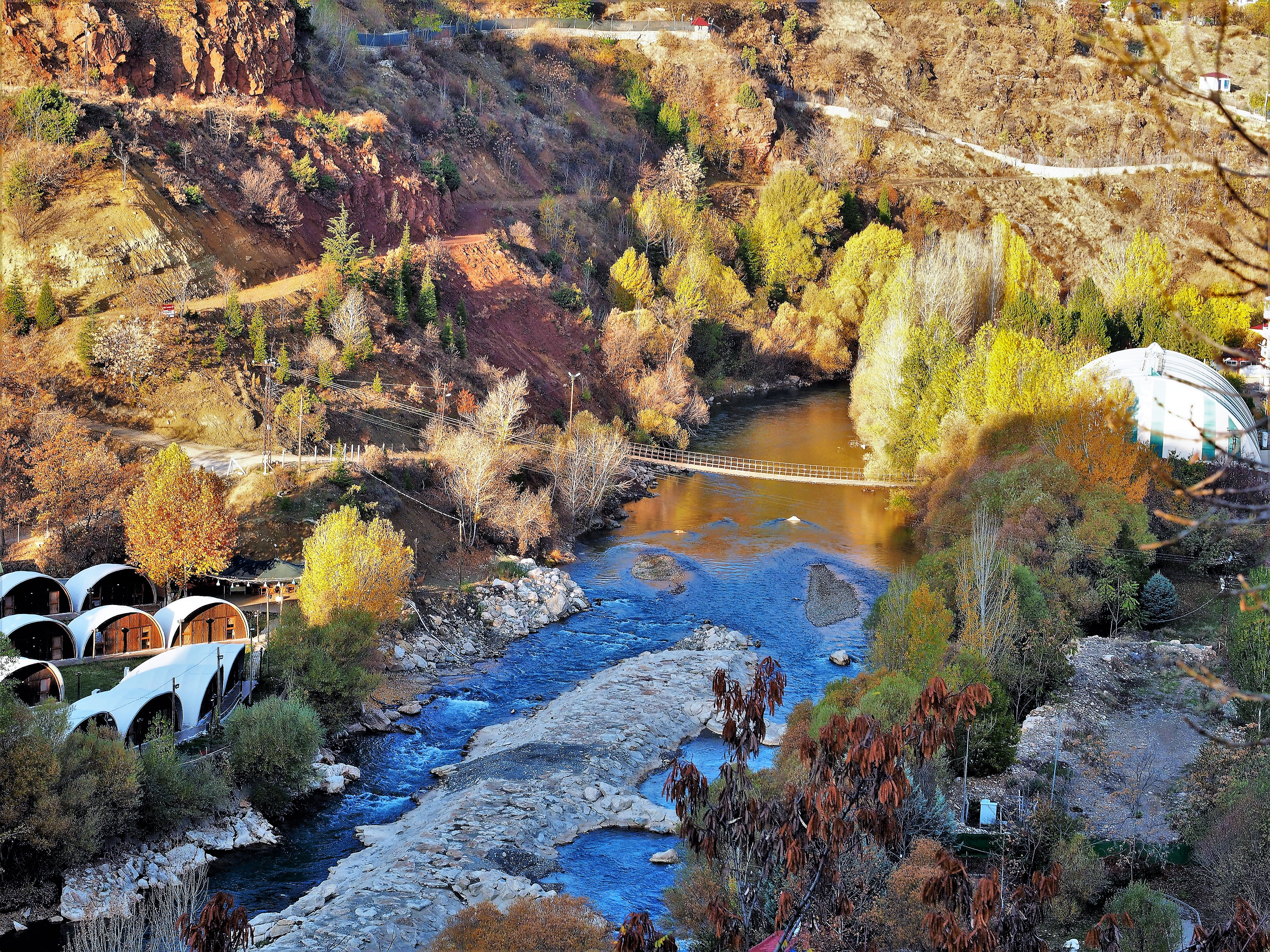
The Munzur River runs through the province

=== Districts ===
Tunceli Province is divided into 8 districts (the capital district is in bold):

- Çemişgezek
- Hozat
- Mazgirt
- Nazımiye
- Ovacık
- Pertek
- Pülümür
- **Tunceli**

== Name ==
Tunceli, which is a modern name, literally means "bronze fist" in Turkish (tunç meaning "bronze" and eli (in this context) meaning "fist"). It shares the name with the military operation that the Dersim Massacre was conducted under.

It has been proposed that the name Dersim is connected with various placenames mentioned by ancient and classical writers, such as Daranis, Derxene (a district of Armenia mentioned by Pliny), and Daranalis/Daranaghi (a district of Armenia mentioned by Ptolemy, Agathangelos, and Faustus of Byzantium). One theory as to the origin of the name associates it with Darius the Great.

One Armenian folk tradition derives the name Dersim from a certain 17th-century priest named Der Simon, who, fearing the maurading Celali rebels, proposed that his parishioners convert to the Alevi faith of their Kurdish neighbors. The proposal was accepted, and the Armenian converts renamed their home region Dersimon in honor of their religious leader, which later transformed into Dersim.

== Demographics ==
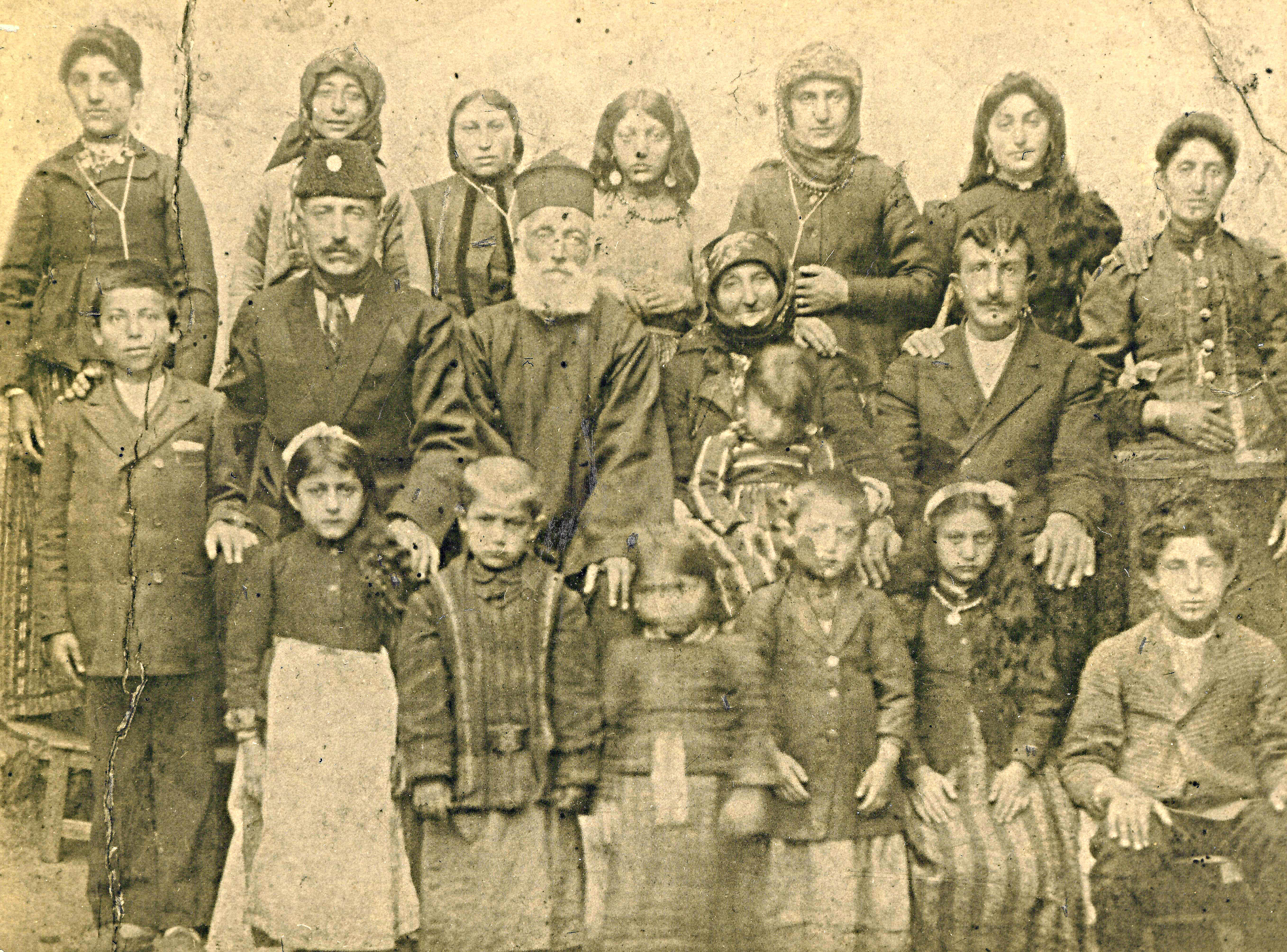
Armenian family in 1915 from Çemişgezek district, Dersim (Tunceli)

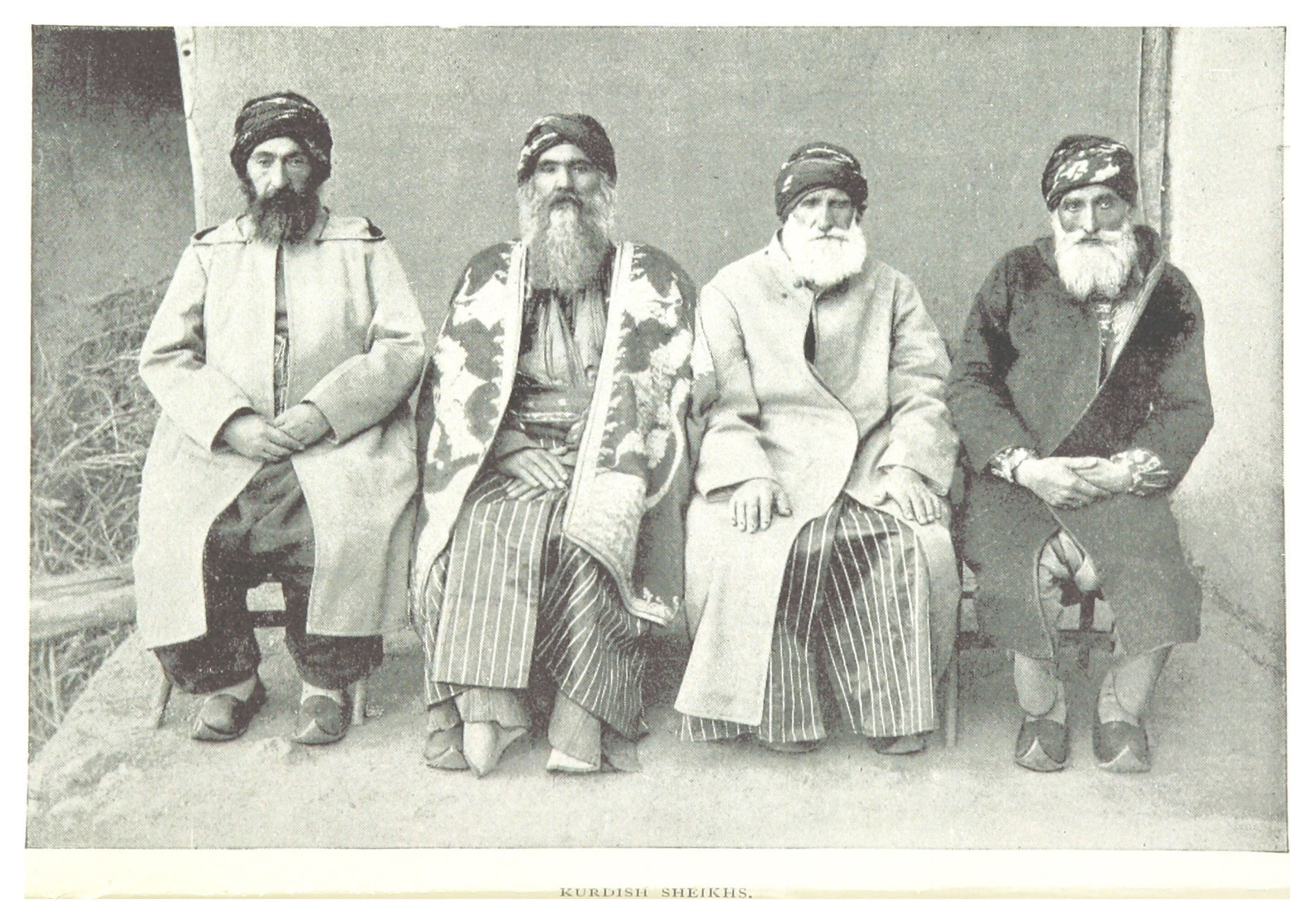
Kurdish tribal leaders (sheikhs) of Dersim (Tunceli) in 1895

Tunceli Province has the lowest population density of any province in Turkey, at just 12 inhabitants/km^{2}. Its population is 89,317 (2023).

=== Language ===
In 1927, Tunceli's language distribution was 69.5% Kurmanji Kurdish and Zazaki, 29.8% Turkish and 0.74% Armenian. Kurmanji Kurdish is the main dialect around Pertek, while Zazaki is spoken in Hozat, Pülümür, Ovacık and Nazımiye. Both Kurmanji and Zaza are spoken in Tunceli town and Mazgirt.

=== Zazas/Alevis ===
The majority of Tunceli's population are Zaza Kurds and most of them practice Kurdish Alevism. The Zazas migrated into Dersim during the 10th-12th centuries, probably originating from the Daylam region of northern Iran. Today, the Dersim region is the heartland and sacred land of Kurdish Alevis. The region's isolation has insulated it from the influence of Turkey's dominant Sunni sect of Islam, helping to keep its unique Alevi character relatively pure.

=== Armenians of Dersim ===
Dersim had a large Armenian population prior to the Armenian genocide, with one estimate placing it at 45 percent of the total population of the region. The districts of Mazgirt, Nazımiye and Çemişgezek had large Armenian populations during the Ottoman period.

The region is home to the ruins of a number of Armenian monasteries and churches, such as St. Karapet Monastery, which remains an object of reverence for Alevi Zaza-Kurds in Dersim today. The Armenians and Alevi Zaza-Kurds of the region had generally good relations. During the Armenian genocide, many of the Kurds of Dersim saved thousands of Armenians by hiding them or helping them reach the positions of the Russian army. Some of the region's Armenian inhabitants that managed to survive converted to Alevism, and an unknown number of inhabitants of the province today have Armenian roots. Distinctly Armenian settlements continued to exist in parts of Dersim until the massacre of 1938, after which the remaining Armenians completely assimilated into the Alevi Kurdish population. An organization called Union of Dersim Armenians has been founded in Turkey by people from Dersim seeking to reconnect with their Armenian identity.

Muslim (Note: Most of them are Alevis, ethnically Kurdish.) and Armenian population of the region according to Ottoman censuses
Year	Muslims	Armenians	Notes
1881/82–1893	41,089 (75.33%)	13,050 (23.92%)	–
1906/7	56,266 (81.19%)	12,591 (18.16%)	9,167 "Armenians", 3,424 "Armenian Catholics"
1914	65,976 (82.39%)	13,825 (17.26%)	13,367 "Armenians", 458 "Armenian Catholics"

== Politics ==
In the municipal elections held in March 2019, Fatih Mehmet Maçoğlu was elected mayor of Tunceli municipality with 32% of the votes cast (Maçoğlu had previously been elected mayor of Ovacık in 2014). He ran as the candidate of the Communist Party of Turkey (TKP), making him the first communist mayor of a municipality in Turkey. In his first year in office, he established free public transport in parts of the city. The development of industrial and agricultural cooperatives, which are meant to tackle unemployment, has already begun.

Tunceli recorded the strongest "No" vote at 80.42% during the 2017 Turkish constitutional referendum. Previously, the province had recorded the strongest "No" vote at 81.02% during the 2010 Turkish constitutional referendum.

The province is a stronghold for pro-Kurdish parties, as well as the Republican People's Party.

=== June 2015 ===
Party	Votes	%	+/–	Seats	+/–
Peoples' Democratic Party	32,281	60.94	new	2	+2
Republican People's Party	10,906	20.59	–36.91	0	–2
Justice and Development Party	5,631	10.63	–5.10	–	–
Nationalist Movement Party	3,131	5.91	+3.78	–	–
Other	1,026	1.94		–	–
Total	52,975	100.00	–	2	–
Valid votes	52,975	98.63			
Invalid/blank votes	736	1.37			
Total votes	53,711	100.00			
Registered voters/turnout	63,614	84.43			

=== November 2015 ===
Party	Votes	%	+/–	Seats	+/–
Peoples' Democratic Party	27,882	56.42	–4.52	1	+1
Republican People's Party	14,094	28.52	+7.93	1	–1
Justice and Development Party	5,837	11.81	+1.18	–	–
Nationalist Movement Party	1,292	2.61	–3.30	–	–
Other	315	0.64		–	–
Total	49,420	100.00	–	2	–
Valid votes	49,920	98.90			
Invalid/blank votes	554	1.10			
Total votes	50,474	100.00			
Registered voters/turnout	62,608	80.62			

=== 2018 ===
Party	Votes	%	+/–	Seats	+/–
Peoples' Democratic Party	28,219	52.07	–4.35	1	0
Republican People's Party	14,358	26.49	–2.03	1	0
Justice and Development Party	7,228	13.34	+1.53	–	–
Nationalist Movement Party	3,019	5.57	+2.96	–	–
Good Party	849	1.57	new	–	–
Other	521	0.96		–	–
Total	54,194	100.00	–	2	–
Valid votes	54,194	97.74			
Invalid/blank votes	1,255	2.26			
Total votes	55,449	100.00			
Registered voters/turnout	64,290	86.25			

== Education ==
Tunceli University was established on May 22, 2008. Tunceli is famous for excellent rankings in National Education statistics.

== Places of interest ==
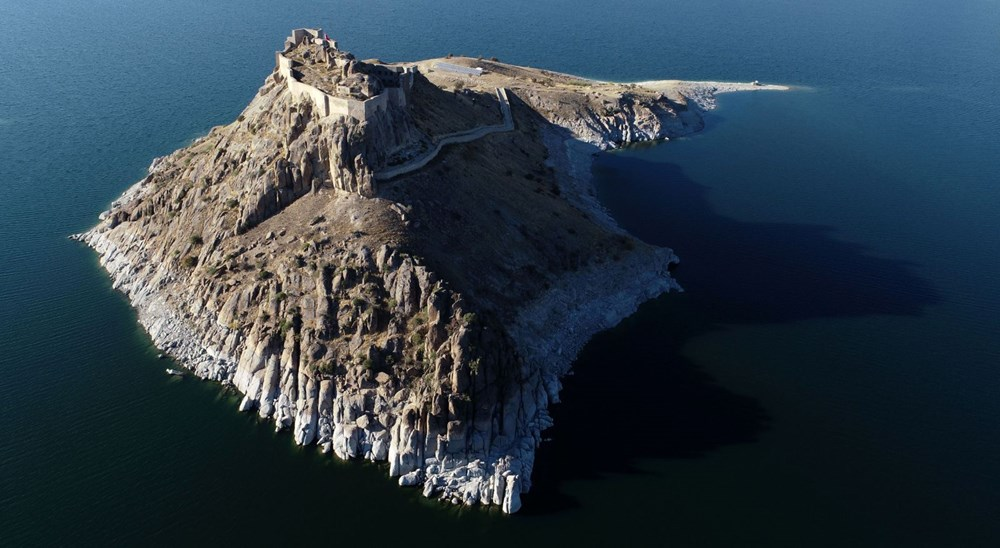
Pertek Castle in Pertek District, Tunceli

Tunceli is known for its old buildings such as the Çelebi Ağa Mosque, Elti Hatun Mosque, Mazgirt Castle, Pertek Castle, and the Derun-i Hisar Castle.

== Notable people ==
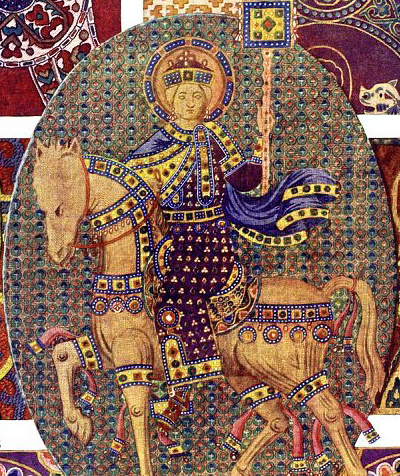
John I Tzimiskes, who was born in Çemişgezek, Tunceli on 925. He ruled as Byzantine Emperor from 969 to 976, an intuitive and successful general, he strengthened the Empire and expanded its borders during his reign.

- John I Tzimiskes (925–976) - Byzantine emperor between 969 and 976
- Seyid Riza (1863–1937) - Alevi Zaza-Kurdish political leader of the Alevi Zaza-Kurds of Dersim, a religious figure and the leader of the Dersim movement in Turkey during the 1937–1938 Dersim Rebellion
- Nuri Dersimi (1893–1973) - Kurdish nationalist writer, revolutionary and intellectual
- Aurora Mardiganian (1901–1994) - Armenian author, actress, and a survivor of the Armenian genocide
- Vazken Andréassian (1903–1995) - Armenian engineer, author, and a survivor of the Armenian genocide
- Andranik Andréassian (1909–1996) - Armenian author, editor, and a survivor of the Armenian genocide
- Sait Kırmızıtoprak (1935–1971) - Kurdish nationalist writer and revolutionary
- Kemal Burkay (1937) - Kurdish writer and politician
- Kamer Genç (1940–2016) - Turkish politician
- Kemal Kılıçdaroğlu (1948) - economist, retired civil servant, social democratic politician and leader of the Republican People's Party
- Mehmet Ali Eren (1951) - Kurdish politician
- Ali Haydar Kaytan (1952–2021) - Kurdish militant, co-founder of the Kurdistan Workers' Party
- Gülşen Aktaş (1957) - educator and social worker of Kurdish origin
- Hıdır Aslan (1958–1984) - Kurdish rebel
- Sakine Cansız (1958–2013) - Kurdish activist, co-founder of the Kurdistan Workers' Party
- Hamide Akbayir (1959) - German politician of Kurdish descent
- Edibe Şahin (1960) - Kurdish politician, former mayor of the municipality of Tunceli
- Hüseyin Kenan Aydın (1962) - German politician of Kurdish descent
- Hasan Saltık (1964) - Turkish record producer of mixed Turkish and Kurdish descent
- Ferhat Tunç (1964) - Kurdish singer, songwriter and musician
- Hozan Diyar (1966) - Kurdish singer
- Alican Önlü (1967) - Kurdish politician
- Fatih Mehmet Maçoğlu (1968) - Kurdish politician, former mayor of the municipality of Tunceli until 2024
- Hüseyin Aygün (1970) - Zaza-Kurdish lawyer and politician
- Kenan Engin (1974) - German-Kurdish political scientist
- Nilüfer Gündoğan (1974) - Dutch politician of Kurdish descent
- Aynur Doğan (1975) - Kurdish singer and songwriter
- Hülya Oran (1978) - Kurdish militant, one of leaders of Kurdistan Workers' Party and is the co-chair of the Kurdistan Communities Union
- Volga Sorgu (1981) - actor of Zaza-Kurdish descent

=== Originating from Tunceli ===
- Turgut Özal (1927–1993) - 8th president of Turkey, he was of mixed Turkish and Kurdish descent
- Gültan Kışanak (1961) - Kurdish journalist, author and politician
- Yıldız Tilbe (1966) - singer of Kurdish descent
- Gülnaz Karataş (1971-1992) - Kurdish female fighter
- Dilan Yeşilgöz-Zegerius (1977) - Dutch politician of Turkish-Kurdish descent, current Minister of Justice and Security in Netherlands
- Zuhal Demir (1980) - Belgian lawyer and politician of Kurdish origin, current Flemish minister of Environment, Justice, Tourism and Energy
- Fırat Çelik (1981) - German-Turkish actor of Zaza-Kurdish descent

== Sources ==
- Gültekin, Ahmet Kerim (2019). Kurdish Alevism: Creating New Ways of Practicing the Religion (PDF). University of Leipzig.
- Karpat, K.H. (1985). Ottoman population, 1830-1914: demographic and social characteristics. Madison, Wis: University of Wisconsin Press. ISBN 9780299091606.
- Tunçel, H. (2000). "Türkiye'de İsmi Değiştirilen Köyler" [Changed Villages in Turkey]. Journal of Social Sciences (in Turkish). 10 (2). Firat University.
- Tuncel, Metin (2012). "Tunceli". TDV İslâm Ansiklopedisi (in Turkish). Vol. 41. pp. 380–381.
