= Kamer Genç =

Turkish politician (1940–2016)

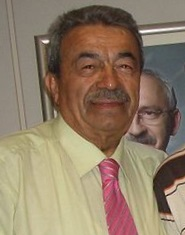

Deputy of the Grand National Assembly of Turkey
- In office 14 December 1987 – 7 June 2015

Personal details
- Born: February 23, 1940 Nazımiye, Tunceli, Turkey
- Died: January 22, 2016 (aged 75) Istanbul, Turkey

Kamer Genç (February 23, 1940 – January 22, 2016) was a Turkish politician, elected a member of parliament for the Republican People's Party in the 1987 and 1991 elections, for the True Path Party in the 1995 and 1999 elections, as an independent candidate in the 2007 elections, returning to the Republican People's Party on 1 June 2010, for which he was reelected in the 2011 elections.

== Life ==
Genç was born in 1940 in Ramazanköy, a village in Nazımiye in Tunceli Province. Raised in an Alevi family, as a young man he spent summers with his father, Ali Genç, in Silahtarağa, Istanbul doing manual labor.

He was a successful student, and in 1960 he was accepted as a boarder at the Financial School in Ankara. However, when the school was closed for repairs, he had to continue his education at Tunceli High School for a time. Afterward he returned to the Financial School.

When his brother Hıdır was dying of measles, Kamer went to work with his father. In 1966, he graduated from Ankara Financial and Commercial Science Academy (now the Economic and Managerial Sciences branch of Gazi University). When he finished school, he began an internship at the Ministry of Finance and was appointed as a tax official in Bingöl.

== Political career ==
In 1966 he was the only candidate to pass the State Council(citation required) (the highest Turkish administrative court) Exam. He lived in Paris from 1974 to 1976. He served in the State Council Enquiry Judgeship and the Office of the Attorney General. After the 1980 Turkish coup d'état, he left the State Council and was elected to the Tunceli City Council.

In 1983 the newly returned Genç participated actively in party life and, deciding to go into politics, chose to run as an independent candidate from Tunceli. However, his candidacy was rejected by the city council. From 1983 to 1987 he served as a public accountant. After he was elected a member of parliament for four terms. From 1993 to 1999 and between 2001 and 2002 he served as deputy speaker of the Turkish Grand National Assembly. Afterward, in the 2002 Turkish general election, he ran under the True Path Party, and thus was not reelected to parliament. He joined the 2007 elections as an independent and was elected. On June first, 2010, he returned to his former party, the Republican People's Party, for which he was reelected in 2011. He served as a member of parliament until the 2015 elections.

== Personal life ==
In 1966, when he returned to his village after passing the State Council exam, he requested permission to marry Sevim Genç, whom he'd known since primary school and studied with in Tunceli High School, from her family. However, her wealthy landlord father didn't think even the new judge was worthy of his daughter. Sevim was studying in Solfasol village, and opposed her father to accept the proposal. Kamer and Sevim have two children, Seçkin and Seçil. He died in İstanbul in 2016.
