= Nazımiye =

Municipality in Tunceli Province, Turkey

- Municipality
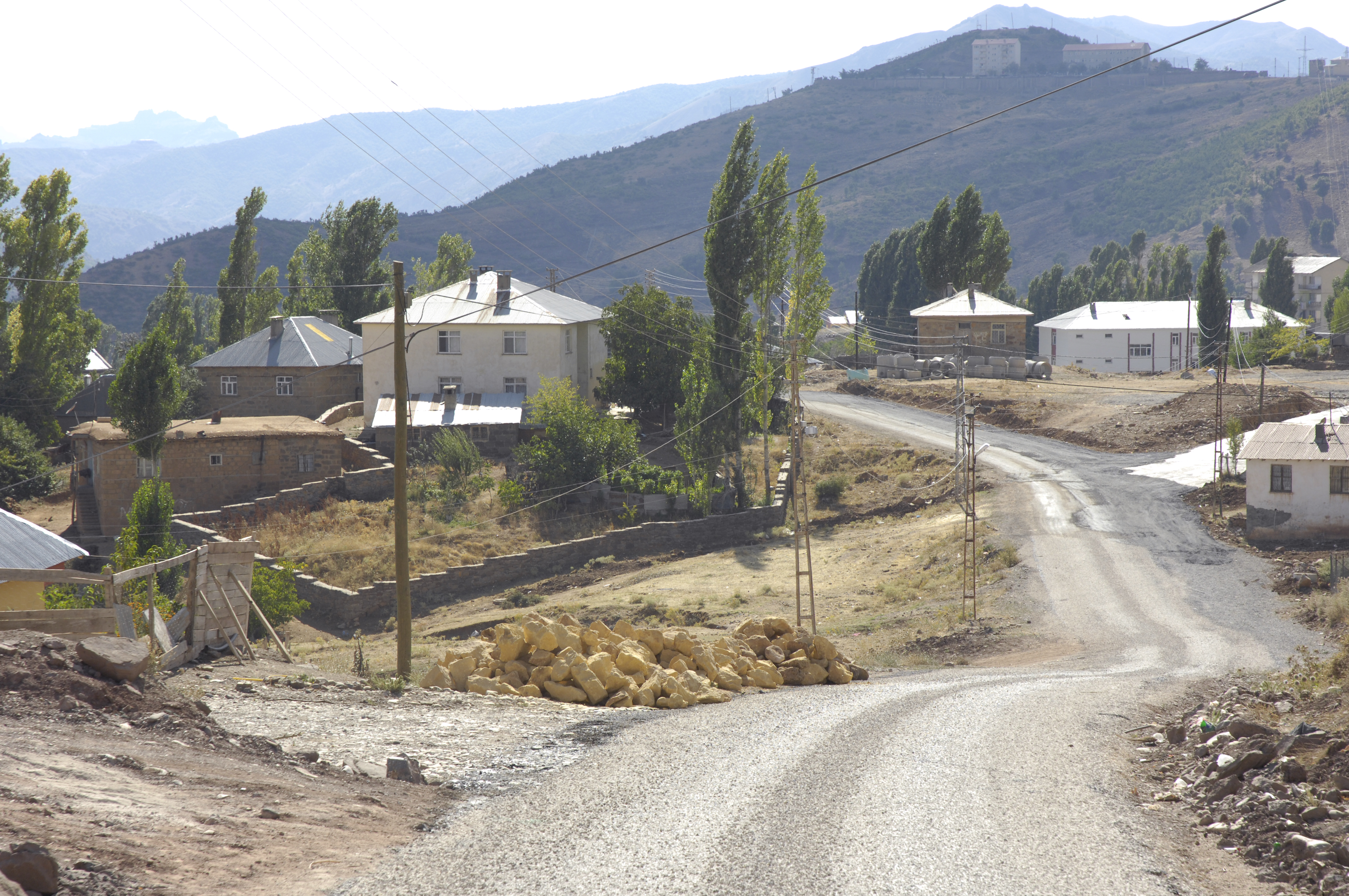
- A view from Nazımiye, 2006

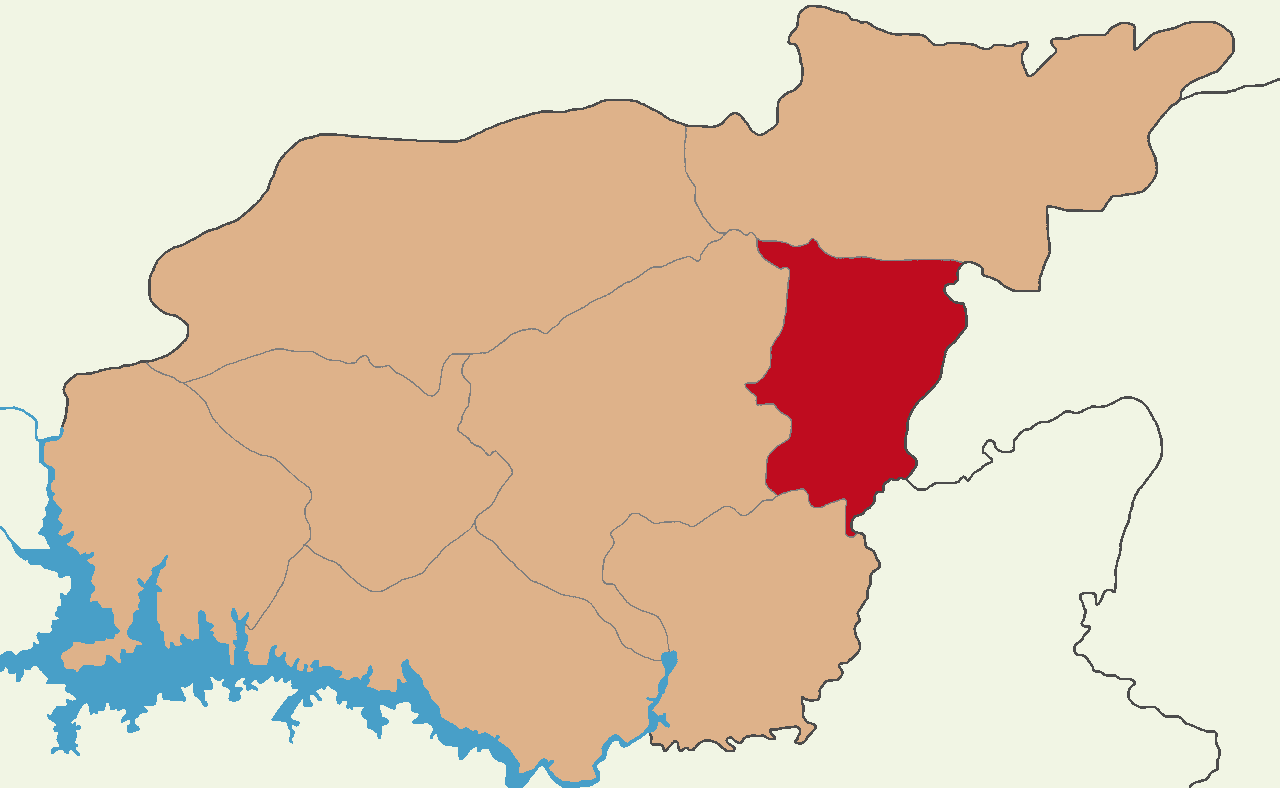
- Location of Nazımiye on Tunceli
- Country: Turkey
- District: Tunceli

Government
  - Mayor: Ali Emrah Tekin (CHP)
- Population (2021): 1,262
- Time zone: UTC+3 (TRT)
- Postal code: 62950
- Website: www.nazimiye.gov.tr

Nazımiye (Zazaki: Qisle), formerly known as Kızıl Kilise (Armenian: Կըզլքիլիսա, lit. 'The Red Church'), is a municipality and seat of the Nazımiye District of Tunceli Province in Turkey. It had a population of 1,262 in 2021. It is populated by Kurds of the Arel and Lolan tribes. The main religion is Kurdish Alevism and main language is Zazaki. At the same time, crypto-Armenians who survived the Armenian genocide also live in Nazımiye.

== History ==
Its old name is Kızıl Kilise (Ottoman Turkish: قزيل کليسا). The settlement, which came under Ottoman rule after the Battle of Chaldiran in 1514, was first connected to the Çemişgezek Sanjak and then to the Mazgirt Sanjak.

In the census of the period of 1521–1523, the settlement was in the status of a village with the name Kızıl Kilise, and there were 23 households in the settlement where the members of the Dersimlü tribe lived at that time. The settlement, which was connected to Erzincan in 1847, rose to the status of an accident in 1876. In the records of 1880, the settlement was seen as one of the districts of Mazgirt Sanjak of Dersim Vilayet, but when the Dersim Province was abolished in 1892, this time it continued to be a district under the Dersim Sanjak.

In 1894, there were 228 people living in the settlement, which had 24 households, of which 6 were Armenians and the rest were Muslims. In 1911, the name of the settlement to be changed in honor of Mehmet Nazım Efendi, the grandson of the Ottoman Sultan Mehmed V, who was born in 1910, was approved in the same year, and it was renamed Nazımiye. Nazımiye, which was affiliated to Elazığ during World War I, began to be administered from Tunceli in 1947.

== Notable people ==
- Kemal Kılıçdaroğlu: Turkish economist, retired civil servant and social democratic politician. He is the former leader of the Republican People's Party (CHP).
- Kamer Genç: Turkish politician of Zaza Kurd origin, elected a member of parliament for the Republican People's Party.
- Alican Önlü: Turkish politician of Kurdish origin. He was nominated as a Tunceli Deputy by the Peoples' Democratic Party (HDP) and was elected as a Member of Parliament with a vote rate exceeding 61%.
- Edibe Şahin: Turkish politician of Kurdish origin, was the mayor of the municipality of Tunceli.
- Hüseyin Aygün: Turkish lawyer and politician of Zaza Kurd origin.
- Ali Haydar Kaytan (or Fuad): co-founder of the Kurdistan Workers' Party (PKK). Kaytan was born in 1952 into a Kurdish family whose members were resettled in the aftermath of the Dersim rebellion.
