= Hüseyin Aygün =

Turkish politician

Member of the Grand National Assembly
- In office 12 June 2011 – 7 June 2015
- Constituency: Tunceli (2011)

Personal details
- Born: 20 October 1970 (age 55) Tunceli, Turkey
- Party: Republican People's Party (CHP)
- Children: 2
- Education: Law
- Alma mater: Ankara University, Law School
- Occupation: Politician, lawyer

Hüseyin Aygün (born 20 October 1970, Tunceli) is a Turkish lawyer and politician of Alevi Zaza origin. He is a former Member of the Grand National Assembly of Turkey for the Republican People's Party (CHP) and a founder of the Tunceli Bar Association.

== Education ==
Hüseyin Aygün worked as a lawyer in his hometown after graduating from the Faculty of Law at Ankara University. After graduating in 1995, he did not pursue an academic career to which had aspired to. He assumed he would be discriminated for being an Alevi Kurd of the political left.

== Professional career ==
In 1998 he returned to Tunceli where he opened a lawyer bureau together with Özgür Ulas Kaplan. He was a co-founder of the Tunceli Bar Association in 2001 and elected its first president. He was a human rights lawyer and defended the numerous Kurds before the European Court of Human Rights (ECHR) Besides he established the first newspaper to be published in the Zazaki language. According to his own account he was threatened by the Gendarmerie Commander of Tunceli who accused him to encourage people to file cases before the ECHR.

== Political career ==
He was elected into the Grand National Assembly of Turkey in the Parliamentary Elections of 2011 for the CHP representing the CHP.

=== Kidnapping ===
Aygün was kidnapped by PKK militants on 12 August 2012 as he was returning from a visit in Ovacık, Tunceli accompanied with a newspaper reporter and his aide. The militants stopped his car on the highway and forced the passengers to get off. His companions were released, while he was abducted.

Aygün was freed unharmed on 14 August 2012. He said he was in good health and that he had been treated with respect. "The young fellows who undertook this kidnapping are children of this country too, and they said they wanted to send a message of peace and a call for a cease-fire with this action." Aygün's statements caused controversy within his CHP party. While hardliner Metin Feyzioğlu criticized him for "approaching a terror organization with sympathy", the party's spokesperson Haluk Koç stressed that Aygün had made a call for peace.

=== Controversy in his political party ===
Aygün made statements about his party's responsibility on the Dersim Massacre and later on the status of Alevism, causing controversy with his fellow deputies and the party leader Kemal Kılıçdaroğlu. Due to those statements completely contradicting the policy of his party, some members of CHP requested to expel him from the party.

In 2014, Aygün participated in the foundation of the United June Movement, a progressive organization in the wake of the Gezi protests. He urged the movement to stay free of turning into a party.

Following Aygün's criticisms of fellow CHP lawmakers and mayors, he was cited to his party's Disciplinary Committee in January 2015. Subsequently, he did not seek reelection in the June 2015 general election, where the pro-Kurdish HDP finally won both Tunceli Province's parliamentary seats.

== Published works ==
Aygün is the writer of a number of books, mainly on the Dersim massacre, including the titles Dersim 1938 ve Zorlu İskan ("Dersim 1938 and the Forced Resettlement"), 0.0.1938 Resmiyet ve Hakikat ("0.0.1938 Formality and Reality"), Dersim 1938 ve Hacı Hıdır Ataç’ın Defteri ("Dersim 1938 and the Notebook of Hacı Hıdır Ataç"), Fişlemenin Kısa Tarihi ("The Brief History of Tagging") and his book in Zazaki language, Eve tarixe ho teri Amaene.

== Personal life ==
Aygün is married and has two children.

== See also ==
- List of kidnappings
- List of solved missing person cases (post-2000)
