= Ali Haydar Kaytan =

Kurdish militant (1952–2018)

- Born: 26 March 1952; Nazımiye, Tunceli Province, Turkey
- Died: 3 July 2018 (aged 66); Kurdistan Region, Iraq
- Cause of death: Killed during a cross-border airstrike by the Turkish Armed Forces targeting the PKK in the Kurdistan Region
- Other name: Fuad
- Occupation: Militant
- Organization: Kurdistan Workers' Party (PKK) Kurdistan Communities Union (KCK)
- Known for: Co-founder of the Kurdistan Workers' Party (PKK), Member of the Executive Council of the Kurdistan Communities Union
- Movement: Kurdistan Workers' Party insurgency

Ali Haydar Kaytan (26 March 1952 – 3 July 2018), also known as Fuad, was a co-founder of the Kurdistan Workers' Party (PKK) militant and a member of the executive council of the Kurdistan Communities Union.

== Life ==
Ali Haydar Kaytan was born on 26 March 1952 in Nazımiye, Tunceli. He belonged to a Kurdish Alevi family that was settled in place of the Zaza Kurds who were exiled after the Dersim rebellion.

He was among the early members of a group along with Abdullah Öcalan, Haki Karer, Mazlum Doğan and Cemîl Bayik which held regular ideological meetings from 1973 onwards and which would later become known as the "Kurdistan Revolutionaries". In December 1974 he was shortly detained together with Öcalan and Kalkan, before the ADYÖD was closed down. He was among the co-founders of the Kurdistan Workers' Party which was established in November 1978. At the second party congress, which took place in Lebanon, the PKK sent him to Europe in order to raise support. On 22 July 1984, he took part in a decisive meeting in a PKK camp in the Lolan valley in Iraq where the decision was to begin with the insurgency. Cemil Bayik and Duran Kalkan also took part in the meeting. He returned to Germany, where he was arrested in 1988 and during the Kurdish Trial in Düsseldorf, he was accused of being a member of a so-called revolutionary court in Barelias, Lebanon, which sentenced two people to death. While he was in prison he entered into a hunger strike several times in protest of the pre-trial detention conditions. He was sentenced to seven years imprisonment on 7 March 1994 for being a member of a terrorist organisation, but the murders were not taken into account. The judges ruled that the murders fell under a Lebanese amnesty which covered crimes which occurred during the Lebanese civil war. He was released immediately due to his years in pre-trial detention together with Duran Kalkan, who was also charged with being a member of a terrorist organization. He then returned to Kurdistan and became a member of the co-presidency council of the Kurdistan Communities Union (KCK).

== Death ==
Ali Haydar Kaytan was killed on 3 July 2018, in the Kurdistan Region of Iraq, under unclear circumstances. His death was initially shrouded in mystery, with many people unaware of it at the time. His death was later confirmed, though conflicting reports emerged regarding the exact cause. Some reports suggested he was killed by a Turkish airstrike in 2019, while other sources reported his death in November 2021 under different circumstances.

Reports indicated that senior PKK figures sought to keep his death secret, fearing it could create panic within their ranks.

Some reports from 2019 claimed he had died in a Turkish airstrike in the Qandil Mountains. These conflicting reports have fueled ongoing discussions and investigations regarding the true circumstances of his death.

Kaytan was considered a potential successor to Abdullah Öcalan, the imprisoned leader of the PKK, making his death a significant event within the organization. His passing has led to further scrutiny of the PKK's internal leadership and the operations conducted by Turkish forces in the region.

The circumstances surrounding his death were unclear for several years and were the subject of continued investigation and debate.

In PKK's 12th Congress, which was held on 5–7 May 2025, Kaytan's death in 2018 is acknowledged by the PKK, along with Rıza Altun's death in 2019.

== Views ==
He was close to Abdullah Öcalan, Kaytan is reported to have called Öcalan "the crowned personality of the Eastern thought" and presented him like a natural leader for the Kurds, while Öcalan stated that Haydar Kaytan had a "strong ideological side and interpretation capability" during the interrogation following his arrest in February 1999.
