= Alican Önlü =

Kurdish politician (born 1967)

Member of the Grand National Assembly
- In office 23 June 2015 – 14 May 2023
- Constituency: Tunceli (June 2015, Nov 2015, 2018)

Personal details
- Born: 27 December 1967 (age 57); Nazımiye, Turkey
- Political party: HDP

Alican Önlü (born 27 December 1967, Nazimye, Turkey) is a Turkish politician of Kurdish origin of the Peoples Democratic Party (HDP) and a member of the Grand National Assembly of Turkey. Throughout his political career he was a politician in a variety of parties such as the Democracy Party (DEP) and the Democratic Society Party (DTP).

== Political career ==
Önlü is a Kurdish politician of the Alevi faith and has been active in several political parties. Beginning with the People's Labour Party (HEP) he later joined the DEP, the People's Labor Party (HEP), the People's Democracy Party (HADEP), then the Democratic Society Party (DTP) and the Democratic Regions Party (DBP) before he joined the HDP. He was active in the Istanbul branch for the HADEP and the Democratic People's Party (DEHAP) in Tunceli. In the parliamentary elections of June 2015 Önlü was elected to the Grand National Assembly of Turkey, representing Tunceli for the Peoples Democratic Party (HDP). He was reelected in the snap elections of November 2015 and also in June 2018.

=== Prosecution ===
He was arrested in December 2016 and accused of being involved in the Kurdistan Communities Union (KCK) which Turkey sees as an extension of the Kurdistan Workers' Party (PKK). He was released in March 2017 pending trial. In a separate case, he was sentenced to one year and six months imprisonment for spreading propaganda for the PKK on terror related charges in February 2019. The KCK case was treated as part of the KCK mail trail and as of September 2019, the case was still ongoing. On the 17 March 2021, the State Prosecutor before the Court of Cassation of Turkey Bekir Şahin filed a lawsuit before the Constitutional Court demanding for Önlü and 686 other HDP politicians a five-year ban to engage in politics. The lawsuit was filed jointly with a request for a closure of the HDP due to the parties alleged organizational links with the PKK.

== Personal life ==
He is married and the father of two children.
