= Gülşen Aktaş =

Turkish educator and social worker (born 1957)

- Born: 1957 (age 68–69); Tunceli, Turkey
- Occupations: Educator, social worker
- Awards: "Kosmopolita" (2009); "Verdienstorden des Landes Berlin" (2011)

Gülşen Aktaş (born 1957) is a Turkish educator and social worker of Kurdish origin. Living in Schöneberg, Berlin, she serves the needs of migrant women in Germany. She was awarded with "Kosmopolita" in 2009 and "Order of Merit of Berlin" in 2011.

== Early life ==
Gülşen Aktaş was born in Tunceli, Eastern Anatolia region of Turkey in 1957. She is of Kurdish Alevi origin. Her father died at an early age. Her mother moved without her children to Germany to work as a Gastarbeiter. She worked for years in a factory to provide for her four daughters in Turkey. Gülşen Aktaş grew up with relatives in Turkey. She graduated from high school in Şanlıurfa, and became a primary school teacher in Diyarbakır Province.

At the age of 21, Gülşen Aktaş followed her mother to Germany. First in Frankfurt am Main and later in Berlin, she completed a degree in political science.

== Career ==
After graduating, she worked in one of the first women's shelters in Berlin, and worked on various immigrant and women's projects. In 2004, she supervised and advised pupils and parents of various origins at the Neumark primary school in Schöneberg, where she lives. She founded a women's network for Armenian, Turkish, Kurdish, Bosnian and Arab women, mothers and girls.

Since 2007, she has been managing the "Huzur" (Turkish for peace, tranquility) a centre for senior citizens, which is frequented by first-generation migrants. The centre promotes intercultural dialogue between different ethnic groups of all ages. Additionally integration through education and leisure activities are organized. Other offerings are literacy classes, a choir, Nordic walking in the Tiergarten and senior karaoke. Excursions on the subject of the History of Germany are popular.

== Awards ==
For her projects related to migrants from diverse ethnic groups she was awarded the 2009 "Kosmopolita" Prize.

On 30 September 2011, the Governing Mayor of Berlin Klaus Wowereit awarded her the Order of Merit of Berlin (German: Verdienstorden des Landes Berlin).
