= 1934 Turkish Resettlement Law =

Law forcibly assimilating minorities

The 1934 Resettlement Law (also known as Law no. 2510) was a policy adopted on 14 June 1934 by the Turkish government that set forth the basic principles of migration. Joost Jongerden wrote that the law constituted a policy of forcible assimilation of non-Turkish minorities by forced and collective resettlement.

== Background ==
There were other resettlement policies during the end of the Ottoman Empire. From 1910 onwards, the empire began to establish immigrant commissions that regulated the settlement of the immigrants from the Balkans, who were not allowed to exceed 10% of the local population. Kurds who were resettled from Eastern Anatolia to the west were also split into groups not exceeding 300 people, and tribal leaders were separated from their tribe. Also, Kurds were not to make up more than 5% of the local population in the regions to which they were resettled. A previous settlement law from May 1926 (also known as Law no. 885) regulated the abolition of small villages and the resettlement of their population to central locations. A March 1933 decree also demanded resettlement of the population in mountain areas to central locations.

== Resettlement Law ==
The Resettlement Law of 1934 was passed by the Turkish National Assembly on 14 June 1934. The law was made public and put into effect after it was published in the Resmi Gazete a week after its promulgation. According to the Interior Minister Şükrü Kaya:

This law will create a country speaking with one language, thinking in the same way and sharing the same sentiment.

The law took into consideration security and political concerns by closing strategic regions of the country to settlement of non-Muslim minorities. Turkish politicians understood that many non-Turks had been resettled on their own into separate villages and so had not assimilated into Turkishness. Those individuals who "spoke alien dialects" had been able to differentiate themselves from the Turkish nation. It was deemed necessity to assess those villages in which such "alien dialects" were spoken and to distribute populations that spoke the "alien dialects" to nearby Turkish villages to force assimilation.

Under Article I of the law, the Minister of Interior was granted the right to govern and redistribute the interior population of the country in accordance with an individual's adherence to Turkish culture. Article 11 was a provision regarding that the resettlement must assure

unity in language, culture and blood.

The settlement zones were divided in three separate zones according to the adherence of Turkish culture in the each particular individual:

- Zone 1 - Areas deemed desirable to increase the density of the culturally-Turkish population.
- Zone 2 - Areas deemed desirable to establish populations that had to be assimilated into Turkish culture.
- Zone 3 - Areas designated to be evacuated for military, economic, political or public health reasons and in which resettlement was prohibited.

In Paragraph 4 of Article 10, the Ministry of Interior was granted the authority to transfer individuals who did not possess a certain degree of "Turkish culture" to Zone 2, where forced assimilatory practices would take place.

According to Article 12, individuals who did not speak Turkish and were in Zone 1 and were not transferred Zone 2 had to be settled in villages, towns and districts that had a preexisting dominance of Turkish culture to foster assimilation. Kurds who had been resettled would not have been allowed to constitute more than 5% of the population in the regions to which they have been resettled. More than half-a-million Kurds have been resettled with the law from the Zone 3 to the Zone 2.

The law also required the resettlement of Muslim minorities such as Circassians, Albanians and Abkhazes, who were considered Muslims failing to adhere fully to the Turkish nation. Although those minorities shared the same faith as their Turkish counterparts, it was still considered the goal, by Turkish politicians to bind all peoples of Turkey to become Turkish. The logistical difficulties of resettling all non-Turkish populations into majority-Turkish areas caused the law to be implemented mainly during Kurdish uprisings.

== East-Thracian events ==
Although the Law on Settlement was expected to operate as an instrument for the Turkification of the mass of non-Turkish speaking citizens, it immediately emerged as a piece of legislation that sparked riots against non-Muslims, as evidenced in the 1934 Thrace pogroms in the immediate aftermath of the law's passage. Law No. 2510 was issued on 14 June 1934, and the Thrace pogroms began just over a fortnight later, on 3 July. The incidents seeking to force out the region's non-Muslim residents first began in Çanakkale, where Jews received unsigned letters telling them to leave the city, and then escalated into an antisemitic campaign involving economic boycotts and verbal assaults as well as physical violence against the Jews living in the various provinces of Thrace.

It is estimated that out of a total 15,000 to 20,000 Jews living in the region, more than half fled to Istanbul during and after the incidents. However, although the Law on Settlement may well have actually provoked the outbreak of the riots, the national authorities did not side with the attackers but immediately intervened in the incidents. After order had been restored, the governors and mayors of the provinces involved were removed from office. Many Turks from Anatolia were resettled in Eastern Thrace in 1934.

== Dersim rebellion ==
The law played a major role in the events leading to the Dersim rebellion in 1937. Forced resettlement was used in the depopulation of Dersim, in eastern Turkey in 1937–1938, where, according to McDowall, 40,000 people were killed. According to official Turkish reports, in the 17 days of the 1938 offensive alone, 7,954 persons were reported killed or caught alive. As the people who were caught alive were a minority, it can be concluded that almost 10 percent of the entire population of Tunceli was killed. The Kurds claim that their losses were even higher.

The 1934 Turkish Resettlement Law was the legal justification used for the forced resettlement. It was used primarily to target the region of Dersim as one of its first test cases and left disastrous consequences for the local population.

In a report delivered to the Republican People's Party (CHP) after the Dersim Rebellion, the law was described as an effective vehicle for the Turkification of the eastern provinces and the destruction of a united Kurdish territory. It was also demanded that further resettlements should take place to ensure that the Turkish population would rise to 50% in the eastern provinces.

== See also ==
- Deportations of Kurds
- Citizen, speak Turkish!
- Varlık Vergisi
- Xenophobia and discrimination in Turkey
