= Mehmet Ali Eren =

Turkish politician (born 1951)

Mehmet Ali Eren (born 1951, Ovacik, Turkey) is a former politician of the Social Democratic Populist Party (SHP) and after his dismissal from it of the People's Labor Party (HEP). For both he was a member of the Turkish Parliament He graduated from the faculty of law from the Istanbul University following which he became a lawyer.

== Political career ==
In the parliamentary elections of 1987, he was elected into the Turkish parliament for the SHP representing Istanbul. After Eren and other six SHP politicians have participated in a Kurdish congress in Paris organized by the Kurdish Institute and the Freedom Foundation in October 1989, they were all expelled from the party in November the same year. Following Eren joined the People's Labor Party (HEP). With time, he then decided to leave the HEP but work in parliament as an independent until November 1991.

=== Political views and Kurdish activism ===
In January 1988 he criticized in a party meeting on linguistic rights that the Kurdish question is not discussed openly and that realistic solutions are presented to solve the issue. He was of the view that if the problem persists, it would be an obstacle for democracy in Turkey. Further he criticized that the existence of Turks of Kurdish origin has been denied and that the law was applied differently in the west than it was it the east. This speech lead the chairman of the SHP, Erdal Inönü to temporarily resign from his post and the SHP to create a Commission for the East. In April 1988, Eren also demanded that the law which forbade to speak Kurdish, would be lifted. He has visited Hamburg and Berlin in Germany. For a speech he held in Hamburg he faced prosecution in Turkey for separatist activities. In 1991 he was a guest at the Town Hall in Berlin on invitation by the Green Party where there he warned from delivering aid through Turkey as the Kurds didn't receive much aid when they fled to Turkey during the Anfal campaign in 1988. He supported the establishment of a Kurdish state and reasoned an autonomy like the Iraqi Kurdish leaders Masoud Barzani and Jalal Talabani demanded was not enough for the Kurds.

== Personal life ==
He is married and has 2 children.
