= Dersim massacre =

Turkish military operations, 1937–1938

- Part of Kurdish–Turkish conflict
- Native name: Tertele
- Location: Dersim Region (modern-day Tunceli Province, Turkey)
- Date: 1 May 1937 – 1 September 1938
- Target: Civilians of Dersim: Alevi Kurds, including a majority of Zaza-speakers and a minority of Kurmanji-speakers; a few Armenians, including survivors of the Armenian genocide
- Attack type: Genocide (mass killings, mass rape, destruction of livestock and homes, forced deportation, abduction of girls, forced assimilation, cultural destruction)
- Weapons: Heavy artillery, aerial bombardment, chemical gas, small arms, bayonets, arson
- Deaths: 13,806–70,000 (estimates vary)
- Injuries: Widespread rape and sexual violence, thousands injured and disabled
- Victims: 11,818–50,000 forcibly resettled
- Perpetrator: Turkish Armed Forces
- Motive: Suppression of rebellion, anti-Kurdish sentiment, Turkish nationalism, anti-tribalism, Turkification, forced assimilation, demographic engineering
- Accused: Turkish government Turkish Armed Forces

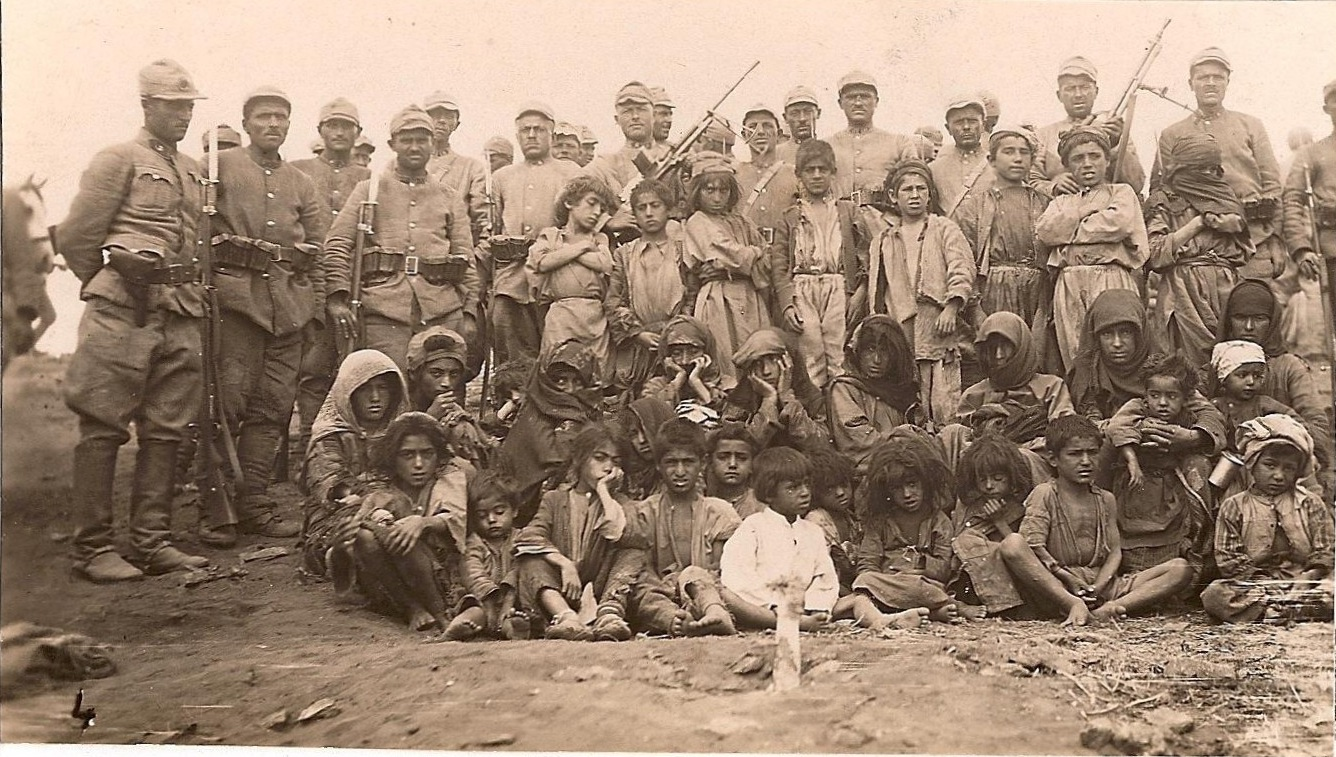
Turkish soldiers with civilians who official documents say were internally exiled; Salman Yeşildağ said they included his sister and were executed after the photo was taken.

The Dersim massacre, also known as the Dersim genocide, was carried out by the Turkish military over the course of three operations in the Dersim Province (renamed Tunceli) against Kurdish rebels of Alevi faith, and civilians in 1937 and 1938. Although most Kurds in Dersim remained in their home villages, thousands were killed and many others were expelled to other parts of Turkey. Twenty tons of "Chloracetophenon, Iperit and so on" were ordered and used in the massacre. According to Turkish Army general Osman Pamukoğlu in the 1990s, the Dersim massacre was carried on the operational order of Mustafa Kemal Atatürk.

On 23 November 2011, Turkish prime minister Recep Tayyip Erdoğan apologized for the massacre, describing it as "one of the most tragic events of our near history" adding that, whilst some sought to justify it as a legitimate response to events on the ground, it was in reality "an operation which was planned step by step". However, this is viewed with suspicion by some, "who see it as an opportunistic move against the main opposition party, the secular CHP", and specifically against Kemal Kılıçdaroğlu, an Alevi with roots in the region.

== Background ==
=== Ottoman period ===
Kurdish tribes, which were feudal (manorial) communities led by chieftains (agha) during the Ottoman period, enjoyed a certain degree of freedom within the boundaries of the manors owned by the aghas. Local authority in these small manorial communities was in the hands of feudal lords, tribal chieftains and other dignitaries, who owned the land and ruled over the serfs who lived and worked on their estates. However, the general political authority in the provinces, such as Dersim, was in the hands of the Ottoman government.

=== Early republican era ===
Following the establishment of the Republic of Turkey in 1923, some Kurdish tribes became unhappy about certain aspects of Atatürk's "Kemalist policies", described as "the ideology of the new political élite tied to the single-party régime", imposing a policy of Turkification, including the removal of functionaries of "Kurdish race" in Turkish Kurdistan and land reform, and staged armed revolts that were put down by the Turkish military.

Dersim had been a particularly difficult province for the Ottoman government to control, with 11 different armed rebellions between 1876 and 1923. The rebellious stance of the aghas in Dersim continued during the early years of the Republic of Turkey. Aghas in Dersim objected to losing authority in their manorial affairs and refused to pay taxes; and complaints from the provincial governors in Dersim were sent to the central government in Ankara, which favoured land reform and direct control over the country's farmlands, as well as state planning for agricultural production. In an Interior Ministry report in 1926, it was considered necessary to use force against the aghas of Dersim. Historically, the majority of Dersim spoke Zaza, while a minority spoke Kurmanji, although it changed after the imposition of the Turkish language and bans on minority languages.

Hasan Reşit Tankut wrote the "Sociological study on the Zaza" in 1932, considered one of the first studies concerning Dersim, which was written in the preparation phase of the operation and massacre. Tankut presented Dersim as a region populated by a distinct people known as Zazas, and explicitly drew on Ziya Gökalp. While Gökalp depicted the Zazas as particularly easy to assimilate into the Turkish nation, Tankut characterized Dersim as geographically wild and alien, claiming that the Zazas lived "between Paradise and Hell." Despite also denying the Armenian genocide, Tankut alleged that many Armenians took refuge in Dersim. 10,000 to 30,000 Armenians had taken refuge in Dersim during the Armenian genocide and, although most left for Soviet Armenia, a few remained in Dersim and the massacre also targeted them. The 1927 Turkish census had recorded 556 Armenian-speakers living there. On 1 November 1936, during a speech in parliament, Atatürk described Dersim as Turkey's most important interior problem.

==== Resettlement Law ====
The Turkification process began with the 1934 Turkish Resettlement Law. Its measures included the forced relocation of people within Turkey, with the aim of promoting cultural homogeneity. In 1935, the Tunceli Law was passed to apply the Resettlement Law to the newly named region of Tunceli, previously known as Dersim and populated by Kurdish Alevis. This area had a reputation for being rebellious, having been the scene of eleven separate periods of armed conflict over the previous 40 years.

==== "Tunceli" law ====
The Dersim region included the Tunceli Province whose name was changed from Dersim to Tunceli with the "Law on Administration of the Tunceli Province" (Tunceli Vilayetinin İdaresi Hakkında Kanun), no. 2884 of 25 December 1935 on 4 January 1936.

==== Fourth General Inspectorate ====
In order to consolidate its authority in the process of Turkification and Islamitization of religious and ethnic minorities, the Turkish Grand National Assembly passed Law No. 1164 on 25 June 1927 which allowed the state to establish Inspectorates-General. Following the First Inspectorate-General (1 January 1928, Diyarbakır Province), the Second Inspectorate-General (19 February 1934, Edirne Province) and the Third Inspectorate-General (25 August 1935, Erzurum Province), the Fourth Inspectorate-General (Dördüncü Umumi Müfettişlik) was established in January 1936, in the traditional Dersim region, which includes Tunceli Province, Elazığ Province and Bingöl Province. The Fourth Inspectorate-General was governed by a "Governor Commander" within a military authority. He was given wide-ranging authority in juridical, military and civilian matters. He also had the power to resettle or exile people who lived in the region. To quell the rebellion, the Turkish Interior Minister Sükrü Kaya ordered that boys and girls of the Dersim region were to be educated in boarding schools outside of the Dersim region. In those schools, they were to be Turkified and following their graduation, married off to each other. Women were to be Turkified at an earlier stage than men as women lacked contact with the outside world and if not Turkified, were unable to pass the Turkishness on to their children. In September 1937, the Elazig Girls' Institute in which the aim was to raise Turkish women out of Kurdish girls was established in Elazıg.

On 1 November 1936, during a speech in the Grand National Assembly of Turkey, Atatürk described the situation in Dersim as Turkey's most important internal problem.

=== Legal and military preparation ===
The legal framework for the operations predated the events of March 1937 by well over a year. Interior Ministry inspector Hamdi Bey had described Dersim in a 1926 report as a "boil" requiring "a radical operation", and on 26 December 1935, the day after the Tunceli Law was passed, the journalist Falih Rıfkı Atay wrote in Ulus that it was not a response to rebellion but a radical remedy for a chronic disease. The Fourth General Inspectorate was established on 6 January 1936, and General Abdullah Alpdoğan arrived in Elazığ as its inspector, commander and governor on 1 February. Throughout 1936 he oversaw the construction of military outposts, barracks and roads, and a weapons-collection campaign carried out with disproportionate violence.

== The rebellion ==
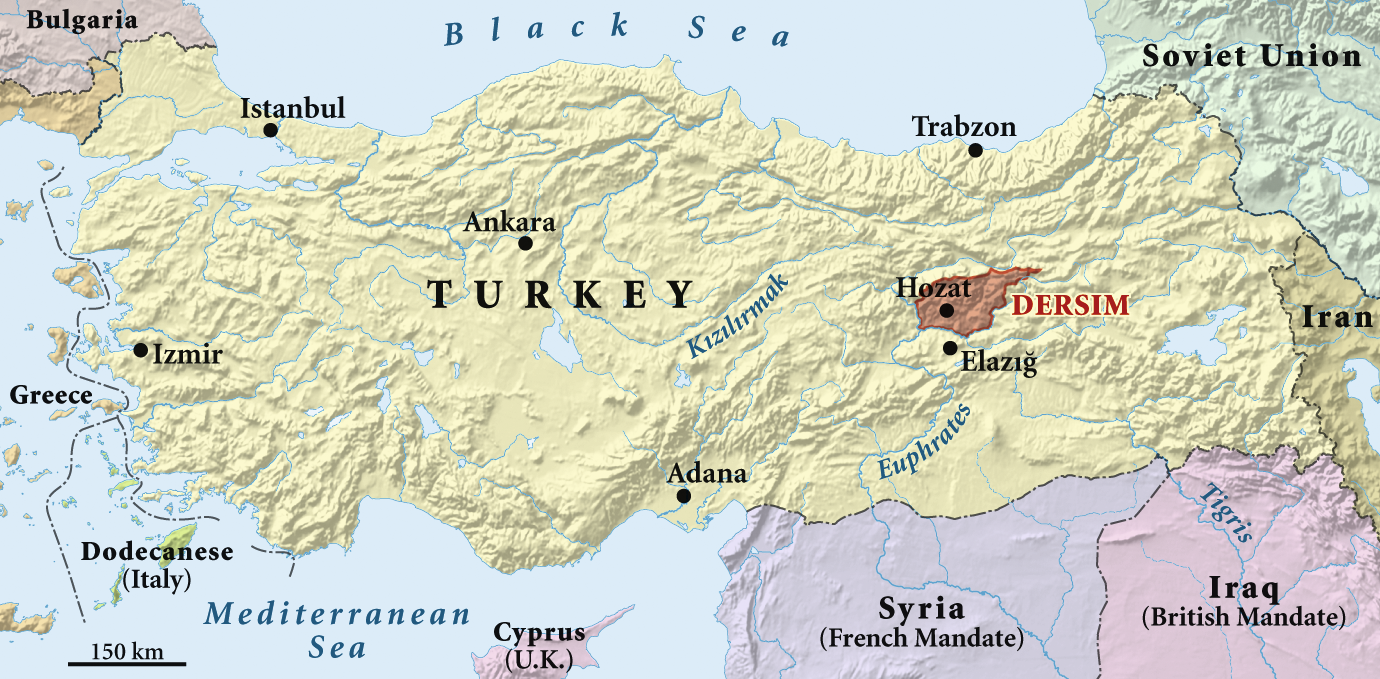
A 1937 map of Dersim showing the central district, Hozat

After the "Tunceli" Law, the Turkish military built observation posts in certain districts. Following public meetings in January 1937, a letter of protest against the law was written to be sent to the local governor. According to Kurdish sources, the emissaries of the letter were arrested and executed. In May, a group of local people ambushed a police convoy in response.

=== Meeting at Halbori cells ===
Seyid Riza, the chieftain of Yukarı Abbas Uşağı, sent his followers to the Haydaran, Demenan, Yusufan, and Kureyşan tribes to make an alliance.

According to Turkish authorities, on 20–21 March 1937, at 23:00 hrs, the Demenan and Haydaran tribes broke a bridge connecting Pah and Kahmut in the Harçik Valley. The Inspector General gave the order to prepare for action to the 2nd Mobile Gendarmerie Battalion at Pülümür, the 3rd Mobile Gendarmerie Battalion at Pülür, the 9th Gendarmier Battalion at Mazkirt, and the Mobile Gendarmerie Regiment at Hozat, and sent one infantry company of the 9th Mobile Gendarmier Battalion to Pah.

== Turkish military operations ==
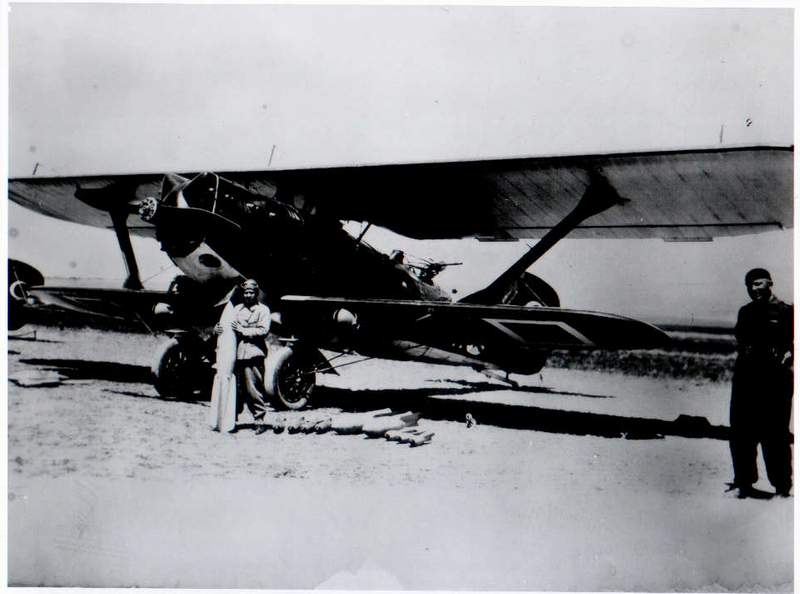
Sabiha Gökçen holding a bomb before the bombardment operation over Dersim with her Breguet 19

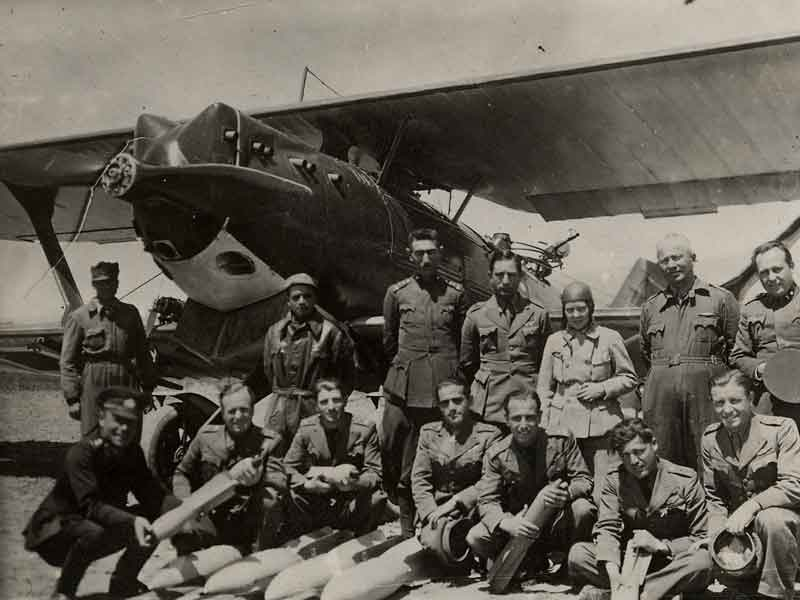
Sabiha Gökçen and her colleagues in front of a Breguet 19, 1937–38

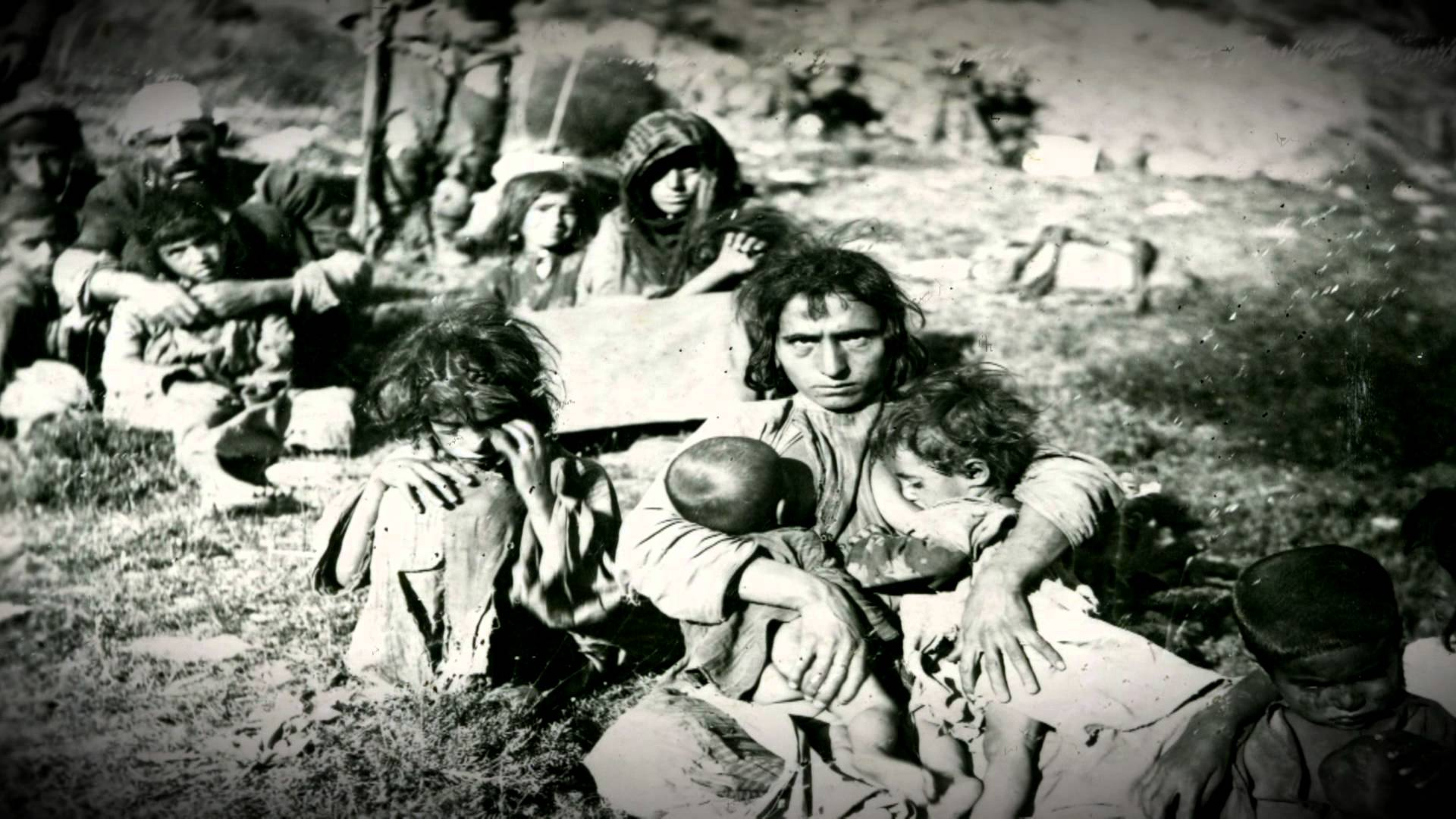
Local people of Dersim, 1938

Around 25,000 troops were deployed to quell the rebellion. This task was substantially completed by the summer and the leaders of the rebellion, including tribal leader Seyid Riza, were hanged. However, remnants of the rebel forces continued to resist and the number of troops in the region was doubled. The area was also bombed from the air. The rebels continued to resist until they ran out of ammunition, in late 1938, by which time the region was devastated.

According to Osman Pamukoğlu, formerly a general in the Turkish Army and an advocate of the depopulation of Kurdish-majority rural areas as part of the state's counterinsurgency strategy, Atatürk had given the operational order himself for the operation.

=== 1937 ===
On 4 May 1937 the Council of Ministers resolved on "a harsh and effective offensive" in Dersim aimed at the "complete destruction of villages and the displacement of families", marking the official start of the military operations. From that summer the national press presented the campaign as a military success against criminality and anarchy and portrayed Seyid Riza as a feudal lord and tyrant leading a rebellion.

==== First Dersim Operation ====
The state and the press portrayed Seyid Riza as a rebel, traitor and bandit. Recent studies argue this was inaccurate, since in his last years Riza had no organised armed force and was surrounded mainly by unarmed family members, tribesmen and sharecroppers under his responsibility. On 9 July 1937 Alişer Efendi, a Koçgiri veteran, poet and Alevi sage who had been living in hiding in Dersim, was killed by his closest friends on the state's orders. On 17 August a military operation struck Riza's family near Bırdo village, between Hozat and Ovacık; most of them, mainly women and children, were bombed and shot, and only three children escaped, while Riza and a few men got away. On 26 August the Bahtiyaran chieftain Şahin ("Saan Ağa") was killed by two of his most trusted relatives, again on the state's orders.

Riza was captured with two companions at the entrance to Erzincan on 10 September 1937. Two explanations of his journey circulated: that he meant to negotiate through the governor of Erzincan, Mehmet Fahri Özen, with whom he reportedly had a long-standing relationship of trust and from whom he may have received an invitation, or that he was trying to flee toward the Soviet Union. Bilmez finds the second less credible given the tight border controls, and reads the first as a calculated decision rather than submission. Riza distrusted Alpdoğan, had seen his family massacred, and chose Erzincan over the nearby provincial centre of Elazığ and its military units, apparently to persuade the authorities of his innocence and spare his people further bloodshed. After his capture Riza reportedly asked to meet the governor, and may have hoped for an audience with Atatürk. According to local memory and press reports, he expected to be taken to Ankara, but was transported to Elazığ instead. The lack of official documents makes these accounts hard to verify.

Riza and the other detainees were tried in Elazığ on charges of rebellion under extraordinary procedures. 58 defendants were tried, 11 were sentenced to death, four of those sentences were commuted to life imprisonment because of age, and seven men were executed on 15 November 1937. Several of those executed had earlier surrendered or cooperated with the authorities, and Riza's son Hüseyin was arrested when he went to visit his father in prison. Under the General Inspectorate Law, Alpdoğan's approval was enough to carry out the sentences and no appeal was allowed. According to one claim, Alpdoğan signed a blank page marked "approved" before the verdict was issued. The court convened just after midnight on a Sunday, and the executions followed immediately in Elazığ's Wheat Market Square (Buğday Pazarı Meydanı), with Riza forced to watch his son's execution before his own. His reported last words, recorded in Çağlayangil's memoirs, declared the condemned to be descendants of Karbala, blameless and innocent, and called their execution a shame, a tyranny and a murder. Rumours that Riza was secretly brought before Atatürk before his execution are unsupported by concrete evidence, but Çağlayangil's memoirs say that Atatürk, on seeing photographs of the executions, ordered them destroyed.

Ihsan Sabri Çağlayangil, who would later become foreign minister, arranged the trials and hanging of the leaders of the rebellion and some of their sons.

They were:

- Seyit Rıza
- Resik Hüseyin (Seyit Rıza's son, 16 years old)
- Seyit Hüseyin (the chieftain of Kureyşan-Seyhan tribe)
- Fındık Aga (Yusfanlı Kamer Aga's son)
- Hasan Aga (of the Demenan tribe, Cebrail Ağa's son)
- Hasan (a Kureyşan tribesman Ulkiye's son)
- Ali Aga (Mirza Ali's son)

On 17 November 1937, Mustafa Kemal Atatürk came to Pertek to take part in the opening ceremony for the Singeç Bridge. In his journey to Elazığ the same month, he was accompanied by the Minister of the Interior Şükrü Kaya and Sabiha Gökçen.

=== 1938 ===
==== Winter and spring 1938 ====
The survivors in inner Dersim faced a harsh winter in 1937–38 in the wake of village burnings, bombings and mass exile. Many took refuge in the mountains under harsh conditions, while those who remained in the villages had lost their religious and tribal leaders and waited in fear, uncertain of their fate. In spring, the garrisons and outposts built the previous year, together with units of the Fourth Inspectorate, carried out operations against people on the run or on wanted lists, often families sheltering in the mountains. Tribes in areas the army had not entered in 1937 increasingly expected to be targeted, and as summer approached these operations sometimes escalated into clashes with those in the mountains.

==== Summer 1938 sweep ====
The forces under Alpdoğan, by now firmly established in the region, did not confine themselves to the seasonal "law enforcement" campaigns of earlier years. Ankara planned a large-scale "sweep" using the Third Army, based in Erzincan, and the area to be cleared was far larger than in 1937, when operations had centred on six tribes (Bahtiyaran, Demenan, Haydaran, Kureyşan, Yukarı Abasan and Yusufan); it now included districts the army had not yet penetrated. The operation was officially termed a military maneuver.

In July and August 1938 civilians, especially women and children, were gathered almost daily at chosen places and killed by shooting, bayoneting or being thrown from cliffs, sometimes in groups of hundreds. Most of the 120 massacre sites and incidents catalogued by the scholars Bilmez and Cemal, Taş date to this summer. Many villages, with their homes and fields, were burned, and livestock was confiscated or destroyed, removing the minimum conditions for survivors to continue living there. In settlements that had sheltered the army or allied with its commanders, people were shut into enclosed spaces and burned alive, among them children, the elderly and women. Girls were separated from their families and taken by civilian and military officials, and thousands of people from a much wider area than in 1937 were deported.

An Interior Ministry document of 1938 records 13,160 civilians killed that year and lists 2,254 exiled households, 11,918 people in total, under the heading "those going west". In a letter to the General Staff dated 4 November 1938, the Third Army commander Kâzım Orbay reported that the "maneuver", which lasted 17 days, had removed 7,954 people, dead and alive, from the sweep area; of 101 people named by the Fourth Inspectorate, 75 had been captured, and 1,019 weapons had been collected. The press, which had earlier defended the state's account in terms of rebellion, feudalism and primitiveness, went along with the official description of the operation as a "military maneuver".

==== Autumn 1938 ====
After victory celebrations in Elazığ on 30 August 1938, Third Army units returning to their bases in Erzincan carried out a second "screening" operation, destroying groups and villages that had survived the summer. The Fourth Inspectorate's forces, whose control of the region was growing, continued operations based on intelligence networks, collaborators and local information, to capture and exile armed individuals and small groups of fugitives who had taken refuge in the mountains; in the villages the region was effectively in a continuous state of war. In September 1938 Riza's nephew Rayber, who had cooperated with the state, was tortured and killed.

==== Aerial bombardment and chemical weapons ====
The area was bombed from the air, and the aerial bombardments caused significant civilian casualties in 1937. On 17 August 1937 Seyid Riza's family was bombed and shot near Bırdo village, and only three children escaped. The press nevertheless celebrated the operation's success. Bombing continued to accompany the village burnings and deportations that left the survivors of inner Dersim sheltering in the mountains through the winter of 1937–38.

Kurdish leader Nuri Dersimi claimed that the Turkish air force bombed the district with poisonous gas in 1938. Bilmez writes that hundreds of villages were evacuated or burned, and that people who had taken refuge in the mountains were killed by bombs, bullets and poison gas.

On 30 March 1937, ten days after the first operation began, Alpdoğan informed the prime minister's office that he had asked the air regiment for incendiaries and the Ministry of National Defence for "burning and suffocating gas bombs". On 7 August 1937 the Council of Ministers approved the purchase from Germany of about 20 tons of chloracetophenone, mustard gas and similar agents, with equipment for filling aircraft bombs. Bilmez and Deniz both state that poison gas was used against civilians.

Çağlayangil, who as Malatya's police chief took part in the execution of Seyid Riza, said in a 1986 recorded interview with Kemal Kılıçdaroğlu that people had taken refuge in caves and that the army used poison gas at the cave entrances and killed civilians of all ages who had taken shelter in the caves.

Muhsin Batur, engaged in massacres for about two months over Dersim, stated in his memoirs that he wanted to avoid talking about this part of his life.

=== Massacres ===
According to an official report of the Fourth General Inspectorate, 13,160 civilians were killed by the Turkish Army and 11,818 people were taken into exile, depopulating the province. According to a claim by Nuri Dersimi, many tribesmen were shot dead after surrendering, and women and children were locked into haysheds which were then set on fire. Christian Gerlach reports that 30,000 Kurds were massacred by the Turkish Army after the rebellion.

Hüseyin Aygün, a jurist author, wrote in his book Dersim 1938 and Obligatory Settlement: "The rebellion was clearly caused by provocation. It caused the most violent tortures that were ever seen in a rebellion in the Republican years. Those who didn't take part in the rebellion, and the families of the rebels, were also tortured."

In Hozat, a soldier later recalled that, after officers disagreed over what to do with women and children who had not disclosed where the men were, the troops were ordered to annihilate all they could apprehend; he said they locked women, girls and children in a mosque, sprayed it with kerosene and burned them alive. The British vice-consul in Trabzon reported on 27 September 1938 that, according to various sources, thousands of Kurds including women and children had been killed, some children having been thrown into the Euphrates.

=== Deportations ===
Around 3,000 people were forcibly deported from Dersim. On 4 May 1938 a Turkish Cabinet decision resolved that Turkish military forces which had previously been massed in the area would attack Nazimiye, Keçigezek Sin and Karaoglan. "This time all the people in the area will be collected and deported out of the area and this collection operation will attack the villages without warning and collect the people. To do this, we will collect the people as well as the arms they have. At the moment, we are ready to deport 2,000 people." In the same decision ordering to respond to any resistance by rendering those "incapable of movement on the spot and until the end", İsmail Beşikçi concludes this meant to kill them, along with orders to destroy their homes and deporting those remaining.

The exiles of 1938 were drawn from a much wider area than in 1937 and were sent to places chosen to sever their ties to one another and to their language and culture. A 1938 document lists 2,254 exiled households under the heading "those going west", totalling 11,918 people. The deportees were dispersed among 922 villages, mostly Turkish-populated, in 50 districts of 15 provinces, with families separated and kept apart for years. Tribes including the Haydaran and Hesenan were reportedly massacred on the journey west.

=== Abduction of Girls ===
Many girls were also separated from their families and abducted by civilian or military officials. The number and fate of most are unknown because the sources remain inaccessible, but research by Nebahat and Kazım Gündoğan has traced a number of "lost daughters" decades after their abduction by officials' families.

According to anthropologist Dilşa Deniz, thousands of children, not only girls, were taken by the military and distributed among army personnel, and that their fate is unknown. She also writes that widespread sexual violence against women also took place, but that it remains poorly documented because both the state and the affected communities have stayed silent about it, partly out of shame.

== Aftermath, 1939–1947 ==
=== Exile and cultural loss ===
The exiles of 1938 were sent to places chosen to cut their ties to one another and to their language and culture as quickly as possible. Many areas of inner Dersim remained forbidden zones, and the deported were not allowed to return until an amnesty in 1947. The religious and tribal figures who had transmitted Alevi practice, including those of the ocak lodge system, had been killed or exiled, and the practices that depended on them began to collapse. Exiles lived under constant surveillance and social pressure to abandon their language, beliefs and way of life.

=== Silence and denial ===
In November 1937, after the executions in Elazığ, the editor of Cumhuriyet, Yunus Nadi, declared the "Dersim question" closed for good. The press that had framed the campaign as a feudal rebellion went along with the official description of the summer 1938 sweep as a "military maneuver", and the killings drew almost no international reaction. For decades the events were ignored in Turkish historiography or presented as the suppression of a reactionary rebellion, while Dersim's inhabitants remembered them as Tertele and passed the memory down through generations. The subject returned to Turkish public debate in 2009, when an opposition politician cited the suppression of Dersim as a model for the fight against terrorism, and again in 2011, when Prime Minister Erdoğan apologised.

== Death toll ==
The contemporary British estimate of the number of deaths was 40,000, although McDowall writes that this could be exaggerated. It has been suggested that the total number of deaths may be 7,594, over 10,000. In 2011, Prime Minister Recep Tayyip Erdoğan acknowledged that 13,806 citizens had been murdered and 11,683 individuals displaced—these figures were based on contemporary Turkish documents.

Turkish Kurdish anthropologist Dilşa Deniz estimates the number of deaths to be between 46,000 and 63,000. Historian Hans-Lukas Kieser writes that 40,000 is implausibly high. Historian Annika Törne estimates 32,000 to 70,000 dead as a result of massacres, citing as sources among others Nicole Watts (Relocating Dersim: Turkish State-Building and Kurdish Resistance, 1931–1938, in: New Perspectives on Turkey 23 (2000), S. 5–30.)

== Historiography ==
=== Turkish government ===
Turkish state's reaction to the uprising was publicly justified as "disciplining and punishment" (tedip ve tenkil). It contributed to a Kemalist perception of Dersim and its populace, which characterises the province as unruly and defends violent state intervention. This narrative is encountered in Naşit Hakkı Uluğ's book The Feudal Lord and Dersim (Derebeyi ve Dersim), which depicts Dersim as a security threat to the Turkish Republic. It was not until 2009 that the massacre was publicly acknowledged, and in recent years, oral history has been used as a method to study anti-civilian violence excluded from the official history of the event.

On 23 November 2011, Prime Minister Recep Tayyip Erdogan apologized "on behalf of the state" over the killing of over 13,000 people during the rebellion. His remarks were widely commented on both inside and outside Turkey. His comments were pointedly directed at opposition leader Kemal Kılıçdaroğlu (who in fact is from Tunceli). Erdogan reminded his audience that Kılıçdaroğlu's party, the CHP, had been in power at the time of the massacre, then the only political party in Turkey. He described the massacre as "one of the most tragic events of our near history" saying that, whilst some sought to justify it as a legitimate response to events on the ground, it was in reality "an operation which was planned step by step".

=== Genocide debate ===
Among the Zazas, it is known as "Tertele Dersim", meaning the "Dersim Genocide". In Zazaki, "tertele" roughly meant "a state of inversion", also used for "massacre". The Armenian genocide was called "tertele viren" ("viren" meaning "first"), and the Dersim massacre was called "tertele peen" ("peen" meaning "last", "next" or "later").

The policy of population resettlement under the 1934 Law on Resettlement was a key component of the Turkification process that began to be implemented first with the Armenian genocide in 1915 as Turkey transitioned from a pluralistic, multi-ethnic society to a "unidimensional Turkish nation-state". İsmail Beşikçi has argued that the Turkish government actions in Dersim was genocide. Martin van Bruinessen has argued that the actions of the government were not genocide, under international law, because they were not aimed at the extermination of a people, but at resettlement and suppression. Van Bruinessen has instead talked of an ethnocide directed against the local language and identity. According to Van Bruinessen, the 1934 law created "the legal framework for a policy of ethnocide." Dersim was one of the first territories where this policy was applied.

Historian Annika Thörne, in her study of historical memory in Dersim, concludes that the 1938 massacres and forced assimilation amounts to genocide. According to Dilsa Deniz, convincing evidence points towards a genocide.

In March 2011, a Turkish court ruled that the actions of the Turkish government in Dersim could not be considered genocide according to the law because they were not directed systematically against an ethnic group.

Official and nationalist Turkish accounts have generally described the events as the suppression of a rebellion. The historian Bülent Bilmez, in a 2025 chapter of The Palgrave Handbook of Kurdish Genocides, lists four variants of this thesis: a reactionary "feudal" revolt against modernisation, a Kurdish rebellion, a Zaza rebellion against Turkification, and an Alevi (Kızılbaş) rebellion against Sunni–Hanafi policies. He rejects all four, arguing that there was local resistance to the Republic's interventions in language, religion and social structure but no organised rebellion with defined demands, and that the destruction of bridges on 21 March 1937 and later attacks on garrisons were little different from routine security incidents. He argues that, particularly in summer 1938, the events fulfil every act listed in the 1948 Genocide Convention except the prevention of births, and describes them as an attempt to eradicate a region seen as resistant to assimilation, including its people, beliefs, languages and name. He suggests the campaign's speed and violence, compared with the gradual integration of other Kurdish regions, reflected Ankara's calculation that international pressure was unlikely amid the crises of the late 1930s, and the confidence of an elite that had pursued extensive social and demographic engineering since 1924. Celal Bayar, prime minister during the 1938 operations, reportedly said that Atatürk finally ordered a strike and that Tunceli was thereby annexed to the Republic through punitive force.

== See also ==
- Ararat rebellion
- Koçgiri rebellion
- Kurdish Alevism
- Sheikh Said rebellion
- Turkish war crimes

== Sources ==
- Bilmez, Bülent (2025). "An Undeniable Genocide: Dersim 1937–38". In Salih, Kaziwa (ed.). The Palgrave Handbook of Kurdish Genocides. Cham: Palgrave Macmillan. pp. 65–89. doi:10.1007/978-3-031-87612-7_4. ISBN 978-3-031-87612-7.
- Deniz, Dilşa (2020). "Re-assessing the Genocide of Kurdish Alevis in Dersim, 1937-38". Genocide Studies and Prevention. 14 (2): 20–43. doi:10.5038/1911-9933.14.2.1728. ISSN 1911-0359.
- Deniz, Dilşa (2025). "A Nation Under Siege: Colonization, Ecological Destruction, and Cultural Genocide of Kurds". In Salih, Kaziwa (ed.). The Palgrave Handbook of Kurdish Genocides. Cham: Palgrave Macmillan. pp. 285–314. doi:10.1007/978-3-031-87612-7_13. ISBN 978-3-031-87612-7.
