= Tunceli (electoral district) =

Electoral district for the Grand National Assembly of Turkey

Coordinates: 39°05′N 39°30′E

- electoral district for the Grand National Assembly of Turkey
- Tunceli shown within Turkey
- Province: Tunceli
- Electorate: 64,290

Current electoral district
- Created: 1920
- Seats: 1 Historical: 3 (1954-1960)
- MPs: List: Ayten Kordu YSP
- Turnout at last election: 87.28%
- Representation
- DEM: 1 / 1

Tunceli is an electoral district of the Grand National Assembly of Turkey. It elects 2 members of parliament (deputies) to represent the province of the same name for a four-year term using the D'Hondt method, a party-list proportional representation system.

== Members ==
A population review of every electoral district is conducted before each general election, which can lead to certain districts being allocated a smaller or greater number of parliamentary seats. Tunceli has elected two members of parliament since 1961; previously, it elected three.

== General elections ==
Election results:

=== 2011 ===
Party	Votes	%	Seats
Republican People's Party	26,723	57.50	2
Peace and Democracy Party	10,354	22.28	–
Justice and Development Party	7,312	15.73	–
Nationalist Movement Party	990	2.13	–
Other	1,098	2.36	–
Total	46,477	100.00	2
Valid votes	46,477	98.41	
Invalid/blank votes	749	1.59	
Total votes	47,226	100.00	
Registered voters/turnout	57,593	82.00	

=== June 2015 ===
Party	Votes	%	+/–	Seats	+/–
Peoples' Democratic Party	32,281	60.94	new	2	+2
Republican People's Party	10,906	20.59	–36.91	0	–2
Justice and Development Party	5,631	10.63	–5.10	–	–
Nationalist Movement Party	3,131	5.91	+3.78	–	–
Other	1,026	1.94		–	–
Total	52,975	100.00	–	2	–
Valid votes	52,975	98.63			
Invalid/blank votes	736	1.37			
Total votes	53,711	100.00			
Registered voters/turnout	63,614	84.43			

=== November 2015 ===
Party	Votes	%	+/–	Seats	+/–
Peoples' Democratic Party	27,882	56.42	–4.52	1	+1
Republican People's Party	14,094	28.52	+7.93	1	–1
Justice and Development Party	5,837	11.81	+1.18	–	–
Nationalist Movement Party	1,292	2.61	–3.30	–	–
Other	315	0.64		–	–
Total	49,420	100.00	–	2	–
Valid votes	49,920	98.90			
Invalid/blank votes	554	1.10			
Total votes	50,474	100.00			
Registered voters/turnout	62,608	80.62			

=== 2018 ===
Party	Votes	%	+/–	Seats	+/–
Peoples' Democratic Party	28,219	52.07	–4.35	1	0
Republican People's Party	14,358	26.49	–2.03	1	0
Justice and Development Party	7,228	13.34	+1.53	–	–
Nationalist Movement Party	3,019	5.57	+2.96	–	–
Good Party	849	1.57	new	–	–
Other	521	0.96		–	–
Total	54,194	100.00	–	2	–
Valid votes	54,194	97.74			
Invalid/blank votes	1,255	2.26			
Total votes	55,449	100.00			
Registered voters/turnout	64,290	86.25			

=== 2023 ===
Party	Votes	%	+/–	Seats	+/–
Party of Greens and the Left Future	24,762	42.74	new	1	+1
Republican People's Party	18,518	31.96	+5.47	–	-1
Justice and Development Party	7,652	13.21	-0.13	–	–
Nationalist Movement Party	3,240	5.59	+0.02	–	–
Good Party	1,306	2.25	+0,68	–	–
Other	2,463	4.25		–	–
Total	57,941	100.00	–	1	–
Valid votes	57,236	98.78			
Invalid/blank votes	705	1.22			
Total votes	57,941	100.00			
Registered voters/turnout	65,578	88.35			

== Presidential elections ==
=== 2014 ===
Presidential Election 2014: Tunceli
Party	Candidate	Votes	%
HDP	Selahattin Demirtaş	21,746	52.25
Independent	Ekmeleddin İhsanoğlu	13,897	33.39
AK Party	Recep Tayyip Erdoğan	5,979	14.36
Total votes		41,622	100.00
Rejected ballots		622	1.47
Turnout		42,244	67.17
Selahattin Demirtaş win			
