= Ovacık, Tunceli =

Municipality in Tunceli Province, Turkey

Ovacık
- Village
- Location in Turkey
- Coordinates: 39°21′31″N 39°12′59″E
- Country: Turkey
- Province: Tunceli
- District: Ovacık

Government
  - Mayor: Mustafa Sarıgül (CHP) (elect-mayor) (deposed); Hüseyin Şamil Sözen (trustee)
- Population (2021): 3,018
- Time zone: UTC+3 (TRT)
- Website: www.tunceliovacik.bel.tr

Ovacık (Kurdish: Pulur, Ottoman Turkish: پلور, romanized: Pulur,) is a municipality (belde) and seat of the Ovacık District in Tunceli Province, Turkey. It is populated by Alevi Kurds of the Abasan tribe and had a population of 3,018 in 2021.

== Etymology ==
Its name is derived from a small plain between the Munzur and Mercan mountains (ova meaning plain).

== Politics ==
It was the only town to elect a communist mayor in 2014 Turkish local elections, Fatih Mehmet Maçoğlu, member of the Communist Party of Turkey. He made public transport free of charge and in 2017 he opened a municipal agricultural cooperative that produced chickpeas, beans, and honey and according to Maçoğlu gave work to 250 people. In the Municipal elections of 2019 Mustafa Sarıgül from the CHP was elected mayor.
