= Tunceli =

Municipality in Tunceli Province, Turkey

- Municipality
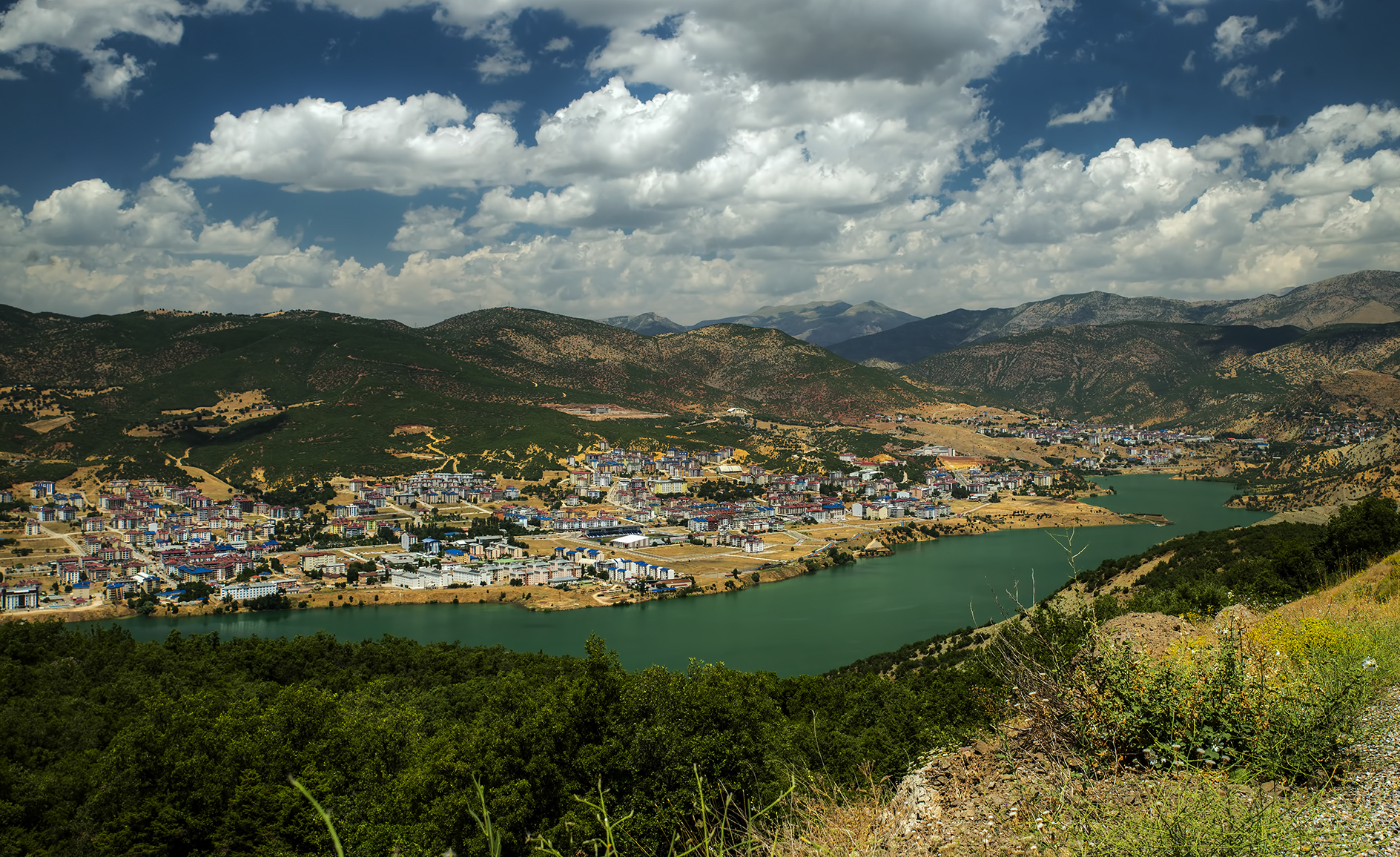
- Tunceli in Munzur valley

- Coat of arms

- Location within Turkey
- Coordinates: 39°06′23″N 39°32′50″E
- Country: Turkey
- Province: Tunceli
- District: Tunceli

Government
  - Mayor: Cevdet Konak (DEM Party) (elect-mayor) (deposed); Ertuğrul Aslan (acting) (trustee)
- Elevation: 914 m (2,999 ft)
- Population (2021): 35,161
- Time zone: UTC+3 (TRT)
- Website: www.tunceli.bel.tr

Tunceli (Armenian: Մամիկի, romanized: Mamiki; Kurdish: Kalan; Zazaki: Mamekiye) is a municipality (belde) in Tunceli District and capital of Tunceli Province, Turkey. The city has a Kurdish majority. The population is predominantly Kurdish Alevi, a distinct ethno-religious community whose identity has been shaped by the region's history of autonomy and resistance to central state authority. It had a population of 35,161 in 2021.

== Name ==
During Ottoman times, the settlement was called Kalan or Mameki. Tunceli, which is a modern name, literally means "bronze fist" in Turkish (tunç meaning "bronze" and eli, in this context, meaning "fist"). It shares the name with the military operation under which the Dersim massacre was conducted. The province of Dersim (or Dêrsim) was renamed Tunceli in 1935, as was the settlement of Kalan, which became the province's administrative center in 1938. Dersim is popularly understood to be composed of the Kurdish/Zazaki words der ("door") and sim ("silver"), thus meaning "silver door." Whether the town should be called Dersim or Tunceli has been a cause of political quarrels. In May 2019, the local authorities decided to call it Dersim, while the governor said it was against the law to call it Dersim.

== History ==
During the time of the Ottoman Empire, Tunceli (then known as Kalan) was a part of the region named Dersim. In 1847, Dersim was declared a sanjak (a historical administrative unit smaller than the province). The capital of the sanjak was Hozat. During the Republican period, Tunceli Province was established in 1935. In 1946, the former town of Kalan was renamed as Tunceli and it was declared as the capital city of the province.

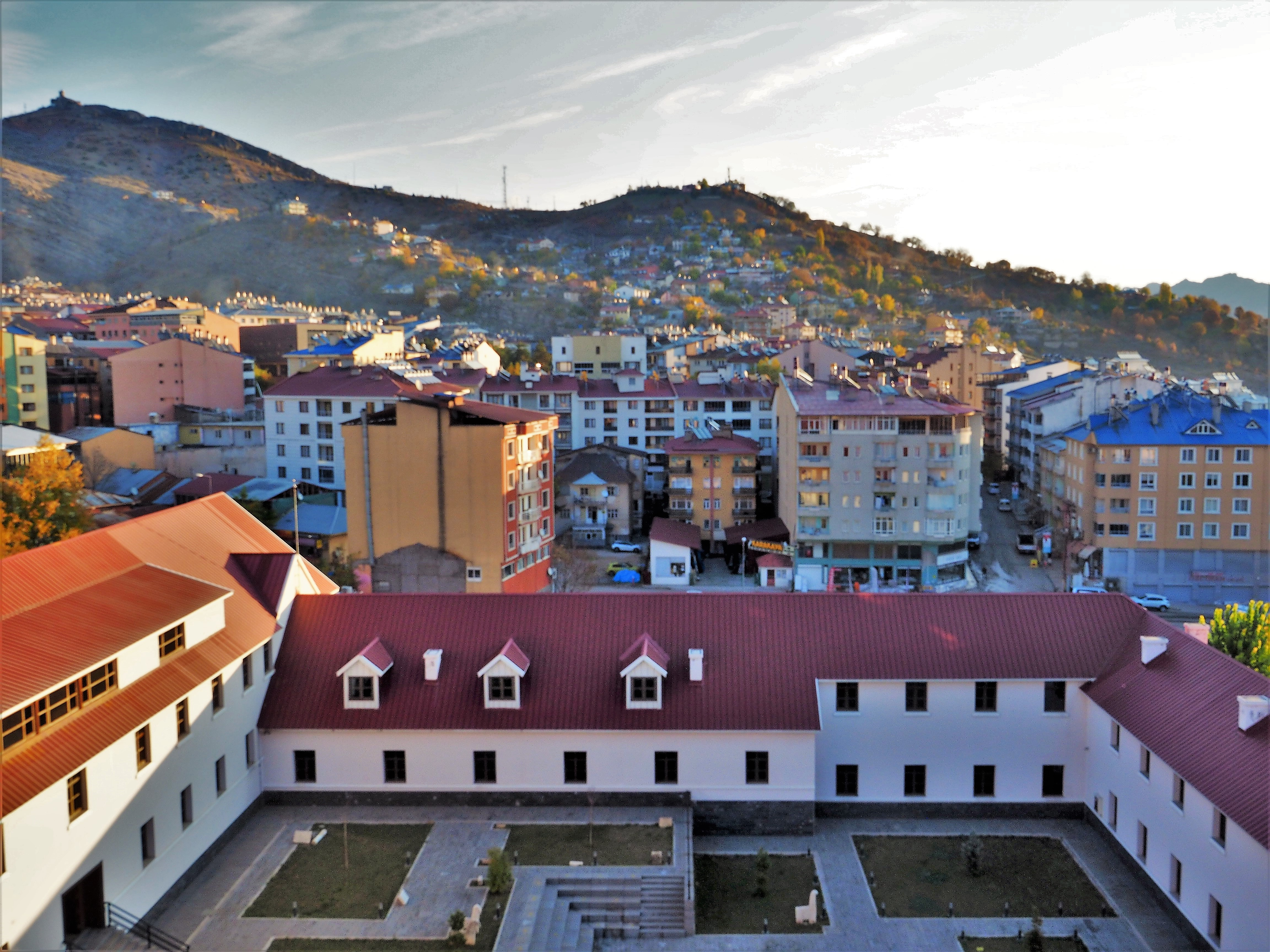
Dersim Müzesi, Tunceli.

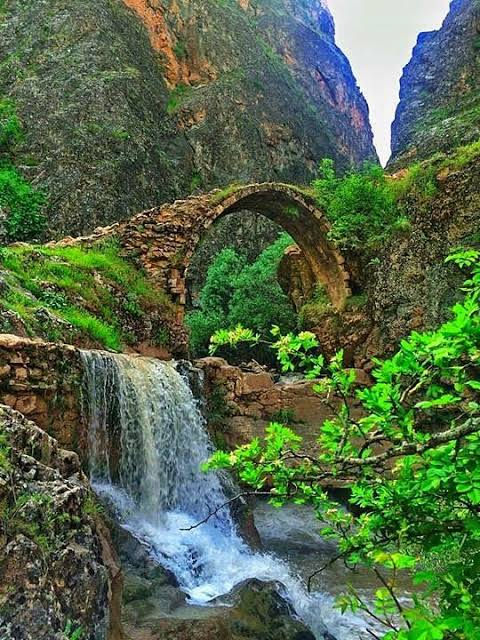
Dersim Taşköprü

Tunceli played a role in the Dersim rebellion by the Kurds. The Dersim massacre of 1937–38, carried out by Turkish military forces following the passage of the Tunceli Law (Law No. 2884) of 1935, resulted in the deaths of thousands of Kurdish Alevi inhabitants of the Dersim region and the forced displacement of tens of thousands more. The events have been characterised by scholars as a pivotal episode in the Kurdish experience in Turkey, and the region's Kurdish Alevi population has maintained a strong collective memory of the massacre as a formative element of local identity. In 2011, Turkish Prime Minister Recep Tayyip Erdoğan publicly apologised for the Dersim massacre, describing it as "one of the most tragic events of our recent history."

Tunceli is famous for excellent rankings in National Education statistics.

== Demographics ==
Tunceli Province, of which the city is the administrative centre, is notable for being the province with the smallest population in Turkey and one of the most ethnically homogeneous, with a population that is overwhelmingly Kurdish Alevi. Martin van Bruinessen, a leading academic authority on Kurdish society, has described the Dersim region as one of the principal centres of Kurdish Alevi identity in Turkey, noting its relative geographical and cultural isolation as a key factor in the preservation of distinct linguistic and religious traditions. The population of Tunceli predominantly speaks Kurmanji and Zazaki (also known as Dimli), two languages widely spoken among Kurdish communities in eastern Turkey.

== Politics ==
In the Municipal Elections which took place on 31 March 2019, Fatih Mehmet Maçoğlu was elected Mayor. He is the first mayor of Tunceli from the Communist Party of Turkey.

In 2018, Turkish president Recep Tayyip Erdoğan stated that if "those involved with terrorism" (referring to the HDP party) were to win the elections, that his government would "appoint trustees without delay".

In May 2019 the Municipal Council decided to use the city's historic name Dersim and also to offer municipal services in Zazaki and Kurmanji. 4 Members of the newly elected municipal council had their certificates revoked in May 2019 for having been dismissed from public office in the past.

== Economy ==
The main economic activity is animal breeding. Wheat is the only notable agricultural product. There are chromium, salt and marble deposits, but only salt is produced. There are a few factories based on agriculture.

== Climate ==
Tunceli has a continental climate (Köppen: Dsa, Trewartha: Dc) with very hot, dry summers and cold, snowy winters.

Climate data for Tunceli (1991–2020, extremes 1960–2025)
Month	Jan	Feb	Mar	Apr	May	Jun	Jul	Aug	Sep	Oct	Nov	Dec	Year
Record high °C (°F)	14.2 (57.6)	19.4 (66.9)	26.0 (78.8)	32.2 (90.0)	36.6 (97.9)	39.0 (102.2)	43.5 (110.3)	43.5 (110.3)	40.4 (104.7)	35.6 (96.1)	27.0 (80.6)	21.7 (71.1)	43.5 (110.3)
Mean daily maximum °C (°F)	3.8 (38.8)	5.8 (42.4)	12.1 (53.8)	18.5 (65.3)	24.3 (75.7)	30.7 (87.3)	35.5 (95.9)	36.0 (96.8)	30.8 (87.4)	23.2 (73.8)	13.9 (57.0)	6.0 (42.8)	20.1 (68.2)
Daily mean °C (°F)	−1.0 (30.2)	0.6 (33.1)	6.4 (43.5)	12.1 (53.8)	17.0 (62.6)	22.8 (73.0)	27.3 (81.1)	27.4 (81.3)	21.9 (71.4)	15.2 (59.4)	7.0 (44.6)	1.3 (34.3)	13.2 (55.8)
Mean daily minimum °C (°F)	−4.6 (23.7)	−3.4 (25.9)	1.5 (34.7)	6.3 (43.3)	10.2 (50.4)	14.7 (58.5)	19.1 (66.4)	19.0 (66.2)	13.5 (56.3)	8.6 (47.5)	1.9 (35.4)	−2.1 (28.2)	7.1 (44.8)
Record low °C (°F)	−30.3 (−22.5)	−29.0 (−20.2)	−24.7 (−12.5)	−7.1 (19.2)	−0.1 (31.8)	1.0 (33.8)	9.2 (48.6)	7.7 (45.9)	2.6 (36.7)	−4.0 (24.8)	−16.4 (2.5)	−25.6 (−14.1)	−30.3 (−22.5)
Average precipitation mm (inches)	121.0 (4.76)	103.7 (4.08)	110.1 (4.33)	100.1 (3.94)	73.8 (2.91)	16.6 (0.65)	5.0 (0.20)	5.0 (0.20)	23.5 (0.93)	60.4 (2.38)	86.5 (3.41)	120.9 (4.76)	826.6 (32.54)
Average precipitation days	11.50	10.83	14.07	15.10	13.60	5.27	2.40	1.77	3.83	9.03	8.83	11.50	107.7
Average snowy days	7.7	3.7	1.9	0.2	0	0	0	0	0	0	0.5	3.5	17.5
Average relative humidity (%)	74.7	71.3	63.2	59.7	58.6	46.9	38.6	36.3	42.4	58.7	69.4	75.9	57.9
Mean monthly sunshine hours	102.6	116.4	162.2	193.6	257.3	323.9	356.8	332.3	275.5	208.3	152.0	96.0	2,576.7
Mean daily sunshine hours	3.3	4.2	5.3	6.5	8.3	10.8	11.5	10.7	9.2	6.7	5.1	3.1	7.1
Source 1: Turkish State Meteorological Service
Source 2: NOAA (humidity, sun 1991-2020), Meteomanz(snowy days 2014-2023, extremes 2021-present)

== See also ==
- Munzur Valley National Park
- Seyid Riza
- Sophene
