= Kurdish–Turkish conflict =

Wars between two groups

- Part of spillover of Iranian–Kurdish, Iraqi–Kurdish, and Syrian–Kurdish conflicts
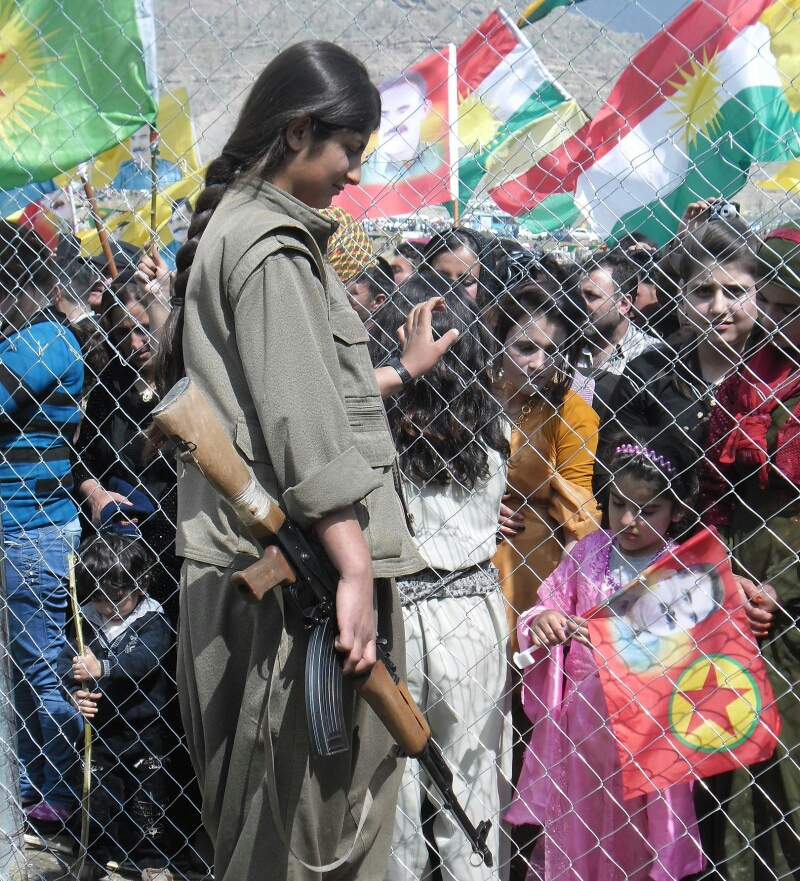
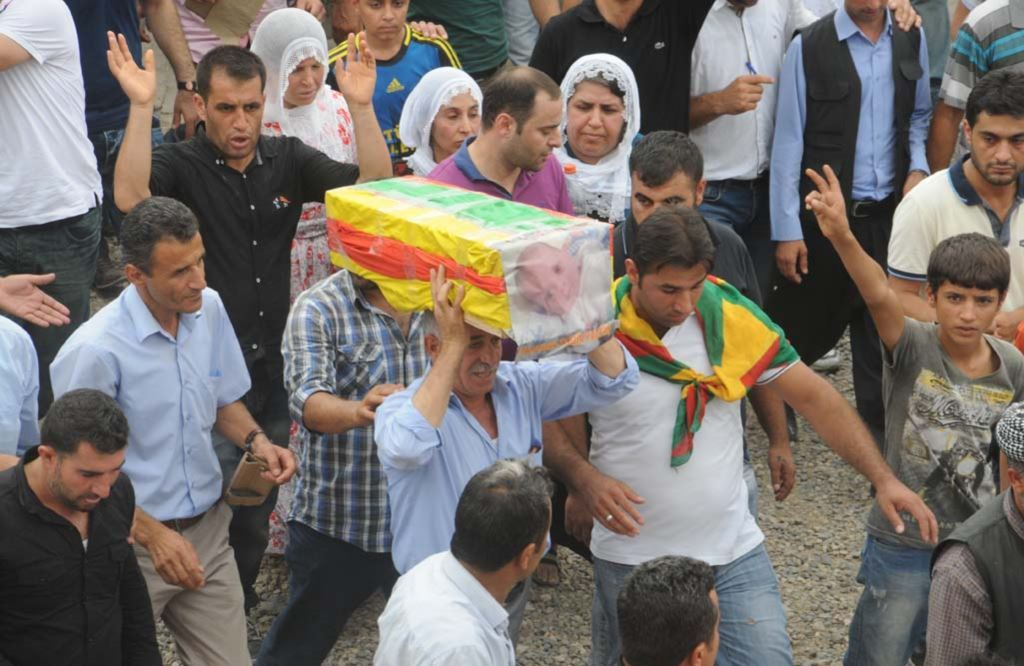
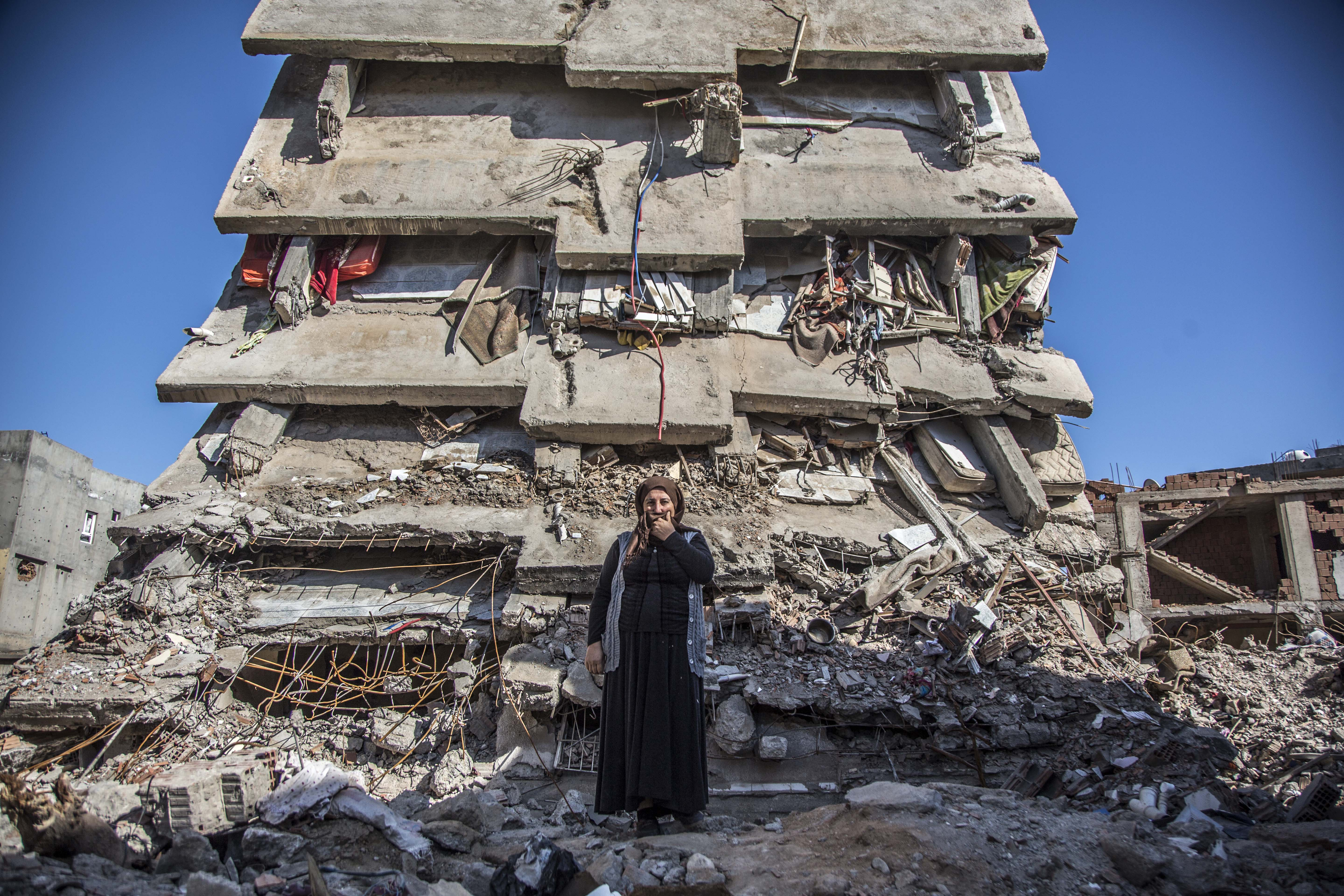
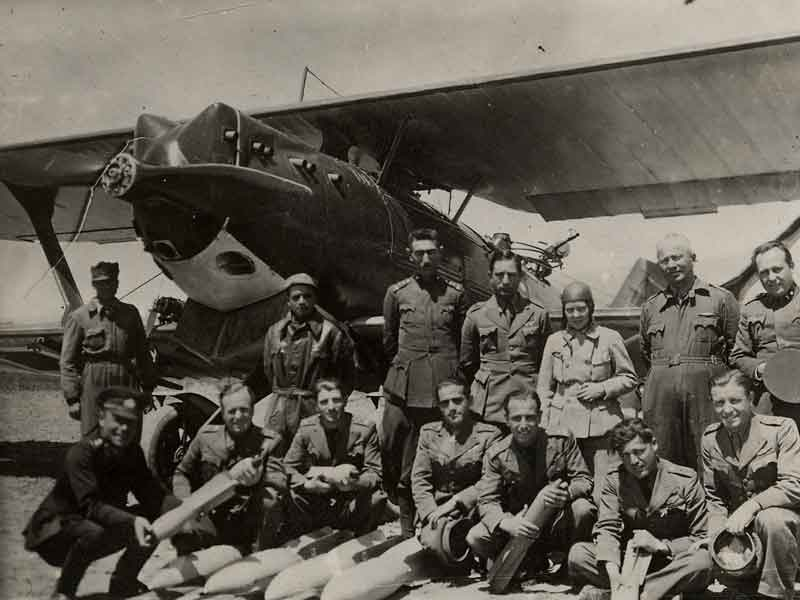
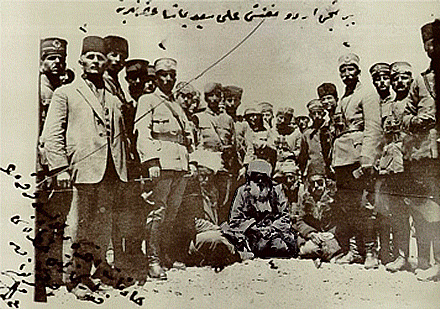
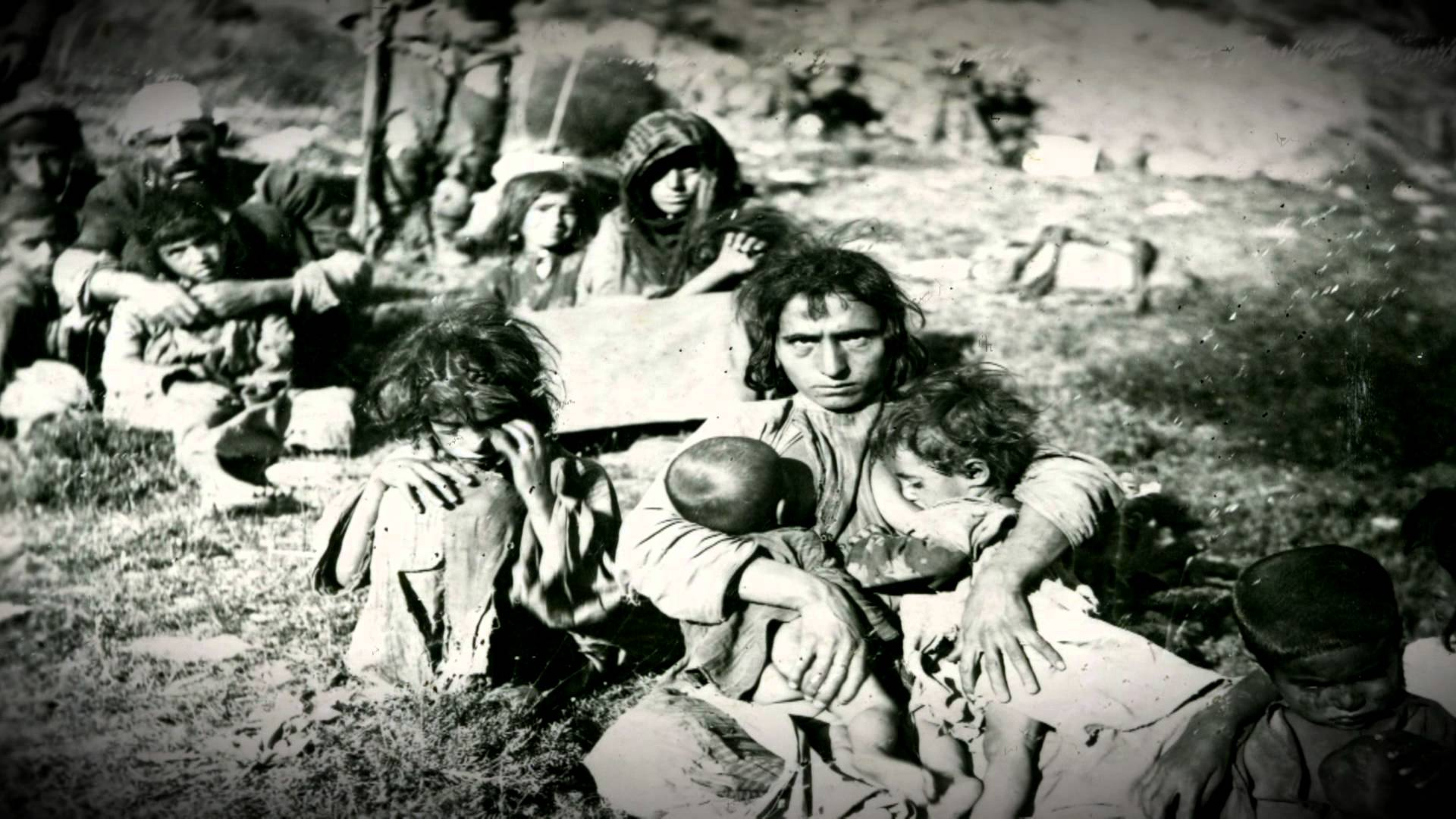
- Clockwise from top left: Kurdish PKK militant at the Newroz celebration in Qandil, 23 March 2014; Funeral of a baby killed in the Şırnak clashes, 2015; Sabiha Gökçen and her colleagues in front of Breguet 19 airplane during the Dersim rebellion; Local people of Dersim, 1938; Cizre, 2016.
Date	6 March 1921–ongoing (105 years, 8 months, 2 weeks and 1 day)
Location	Turkey (Turkish Kurdistan), Iraq (Iraqi Kurdistan), Syria (Rojava; Syrian Kurdistan)
Result	Ongoing

Belligerents
Grand National Assembly (1920–1923); Turkey (since 1923); Loyalist Kurdish tribes (since 2015); Kurdistan Region (only against PKK-allied groups)	1920–1938: Various tribes; SAK; Republic of Ararat (1927–1931); Xoybûn; PKK (1978–); KCK; HPG (2000–); YJA-STAR (2004–); YDG-H (2013–); YPS (2015–); YPS-Jin (2016–); Kurdish Hezbollah (1983–2013); TAK (2004–)

Commanders and leaders
Mustafa Kemal Atatürk Nureddin Pasha; Kâzım İnanç Mürsel Bakû Naci Eldeniz; İsmet İnönü Kâzım Orbay Abdullah Alpdoğan; Fevzi Çakmak İbrahim Tali Öngören İzzettin Çalışlar Salih Omurtak; Osman Pamukoğlu Esat Oktay Yıldıran X Kenan Evren Turgut Özal Süleyman Demirel Ahmet Necdet Sezer Abdullah Gül Bülent Ecevit Mesut Yılmaz Necmettin Erbakan Tansu Çiller Işık Koşaner İlker Başbuğ Gaffar Okkan X Yaşar Büyükanıt Hilmi Özkök Hüseyin Kıvrıkoğlu İsmail Hakkı Karadayı Doğan Güreş Necip Torumtay Necdet Üruğ Nurettin Ersin Recep Tayyip Erdoğan Ahmet Davutoğlu Binali Yıldırım Hulusi Akar	Alişan Bey (surrendered) Nuri Dersimi Alişer; Halid Beg Cibran (executed) Sheikh Said (executed); Ihsan Nuri Ibrahim Heski Ferzende Halis Öztürk; Abd al-Salam Barzani; Seyid Riza (POW) (executed) Kamer Aga (Yusufan) Cebrail Aga (Demenan) Kamer Aga (Haydaran) Zarîfe †; Abdullah Öcalan (POW) Şemdin Sakık (POW) Osman Öcalan Mahsum Korkmaz † Nizamettin Taş Ibrahim Parlak Mazlum Doğan Kani Yılmaz † Hüseyin Yıldırım Haki Karer † Halil Atac Murat Karayılan Bahoz Erdal Cemîl Bayik Mustafa Karasu Duran Kalkan Ali Haydar Kaytan; Hüseyin Velioğlu † Edip Gümüş (POW) Cemal Tutar (POW) İsa Altsoy (surrendered)

Strength
Kocgiri: 3,161–31,000; Said: 25,000–52,000; Ararat: 10,000–66,000; Dersim: 50,000; Armed Forces: 639,551 Gendarmerie: 148,700 Police: 225,000 Village Guards: 60,000 (Turkey) Total: 948,550 (not all directly involved in the conflict)	Kocgiri: 3,000–6,000; Said: 15,000; Ararat: 5,000–8,000; Dersim: 6,000; PKK: 4,000–32,800

Casualties and losses
Kocgiri: Unknown; Said: Unknown; Ararat: Unknown; Dersim: 110 killed; Kurdish–Turkish conflict (1978–2025): 8,252 killed	Kocgiri: 500 rebels killed; Said: Unknown; Ararat: Unknown; Dersim: 10,000–13,160 killed; Kurdish–Turkish conflict (1978–2025): 60,000+ killed and 20,700+ captured
- Said revolt: 15,000–20,000 to 40,000–250,000 civilians killed Ararat revolt: 4,500 civilians killed Kurdish–Turkish conflict (1978–2025): 6,741 to 18,000–20,000 civilians killed Hundreds of thousands of Kurds displaced Total: 120,000+ killed

Kurdish nationalist uprisings have periodically occurred in Turkey, beginning with the Turkish War of Independence and the consequent transition from the Ottoman Empire to the modern Turkish state and continuing to the present day with the current PKK–Turkey conflict.

According to Ottoman military records, Kurdish rebellions have been occurring in Anatolia for over two centuries. While large tribal Kurdish revolts had shaken the Ottoman Empire during the last decades of its existence, the modern phase of the conflict is believed to have begun in 1922, with the emergence of Kurdish nationalism which occurred in parallel with the formation of the modern State of Turkey. In 1925, an uprising for an independent Kurdistan, led by Shaikh Said Piran, was quickly put down, and soon afterward, Said and 36 of his followers were executed. Other large-scale Kurdish revolts occurred in Ararat and Dersim in 1930 and 1937. The British consul at Trebizond, the diplomatic post which was closest to Dersim, spoke of brutal and indiscriminate acts of violence and explicitly compared them to the 1915 Armenian genocide. "Thousands of Kurds," he wrote, "including women and children, were slain; others, mostly children, were thrown into the Euphrates; while thousands of others in less hostile areas, who had first been deprived of their cattle and other belongings, were deported to vilayets (provinces) in Central Anatolia. It is now stated that the Kurdish question no longer exists in Turkey."

The Kurds accuse successive Turkish governments of suppressing their identity through such means as the banning of Kurdish languages in print and media. Atatürk believed that the unity and stability of a country both lay in the existence of a unitary political identity, relegating cultural and ethnic distinctions to the private sphere. However, many Kurds did not relinquish their identity and they also did not relinquish their language. Large-scale armed conflict between the Turkish armed forces and the Kurdistan Workers' Party (PKK) occurred throughout the 1980s and 1990s, leaving over 35,000 dead.

== Background ==
The history of Kurdish rebellions against the Ottoman Empire dates back two centuries, but the modern conflict dates back to the abolition of the Caliphate. During the reign of Abdul Hamid II, who was Caliph as well as Sultan, the Kurds were loyal subjects of the Caliph and the establishment of a secular republic after the abolition of the Caliphate in 1924 became a source of widespread resentment. The establishment of the Turkish nationalist state and Turkish citizenship brought an end to the centuries-old millet system, which had unified the Muslim ethnic groups of the Ottoman Empire under a unified Muslim identity. The diverse Muslim ethnic groups of the former Empire were considered Turkish by the newly formed secular Turkish state, which did not recognize an independent Kurdish or Islamic national identity. One of the consequences of these seismic changes was a series of uprisings in Turkey's Kurdish-populated eastern and southeastern regions.

== History ==
=== Bitlis uprising (1914) ===
The Bitlis uprising was a Kurdish uprising in the Ottoman Empire in early 1914. It was supported by the Russian Empire. It was fought concurrently with an unrelated Kurdish uprising in Barzan in the Mosul Vilayet, which was also supported by Russia. Later Kurdish nationalist historiography portrayed the uprising as part of a Kurdish nationalist struggle, but its actual causes laid in opposition to conscription and taxation. The uprising began in early March, with a skirmish between Kurdish fighters and Ottoman gendarmes, where the latter was forced to retreat. The Kurds subsequently laid siege to the city of Bitlis, and captured the city on 2 April. Ottoman forces were then dispatched from Muş and Van and suppressed the uprising. After the defeat of the uprising on 4 April, one of the rebel leaders, Molla Selim, successfully sought asylum in Russia.

=== Kurdish rebellions during World War I (1914-1918) ===
During World War I, several Kurdish rebellions took place within the Ottoman Empire.

=== Koçgiri rebellion (1920) ===
The 1920 Koçgiri Rebellion in the overwhelmingly Qizilbash Dersim region, while waged by the Qizilbash Koçkiri tribe, was masterminded by members of an organisation known as the Kürdistan Taâlî Cemiyeti (KTC). This particular rebellion failed for several reasons, most of which have something to do with its Qizilbash character. The fact was that many Dersim tribal chiefs at this point still supported the Kemalists — regarding Mustafa Kemal as their 'protector' against the excesses of Sunni religious zealots, some of whom were Kurmancî Kurds. To most Kurmancî Kurds at the time, the uprising appeared to be merely an Alevi uprising — and thus not in their own interests. In the aftermath of the Koçkiri rebellion there was talk in the new Turkish Republic's Grand National Assembly of some very limited forms of 'Autonomous Administration' by the Kurds in a Kurdish region centered in Kurdistan. All this disappeared in the 1923 Treaty of Lausanne, however. Bitterly disappointed, the Kurds turned again to armed struggle in 1925 — this time led by the Zaza cleric Sheikh Said, but organized by another, newer, Kurdish nationalist organization, Azadî.

=== Sheikh Said rebellion (1925) ===
The main rebellion which dominates the history of the Kurds in Turkey is that of the 1925 rebellion in Kurdistan region of Turkey which was led by Sheikh Said. The repression and aggression of Kemalist secularism followed and all public manifestations of Kurdish identity was outlawed which, in turn, prepared Kurds for more rebellion. The revolt of Sheikh Said began in February 1925. Of almost 15,000 fighters who participated in the rebellion against the 52,000 Turkish Gendarmerie, the main Kurdish tribes participating in the rebellion came from Zaza. The rebellion covered most of the part of Amed (Diyarbakir) and Mardin provinces. The Sheikh Said rebellion was the first large scale rebellion of the Kurdish race movement in Turkey. The main organizer of this rebellion was the Kurdish Independent Society, Azadî. Azadi's intention was to liberate Kurds from Turkish oppression and thus deliver freedom and further, develop their country. By March 1925 the revolt was pretty much over. Sheikh Said and all the other rebel leaders were hanged by 29 June.

In Fall of 1927 Sheikh Abdurrahman (brother of Sheikh Said) began a series of attacks on Turkish garrisons in Palu and Malatya. Districts of Lice, Bingöl were captured by the rebels. They also occupied the heights south of Erzurum. Turkish military used air force against the rebels using five airplanes in Mardin. In October 1927, Kurdish rebels attacked and occupied Bayazid. The brother of Sheikh Said tried to exact revenge on the Turkish government by attacking several army bases in Kurdistan. Nothing permanent was accomplished. They were driven out after Turkish reinforcements arrived in the area.

The rebellion failed, however, by 1929, Ihsan Nuri's movement was in control of a large expanse of Kurdish territory and the revolt was put down by the year 1930.

=== Ararat rebellion (1927–1930) ===
The Republic of Ararat (Turkish: Ağrı) was a self-proclaimed Kurdish state. It was located in the east of modern Turkey, being centered on Ağrı Province. The Republic of Ararat was declared independent in 1927, during a wave of rebellion among Kurds in south-eastern Turkey. The rebellion was led by General İhsan Nuri Pasha. However it was not recognized by other states, and lacked foreign support.

By the end of summer 1930, the Turkish Air Force was bombing Kurdish positions around Mount Ararat from all directions. According to General Ihsan Nuri Pasha, the military superiority of Turkish Air Force demoralized Kurds and led to their capitulation. On 13 July, the rebellion in Zilan was suppressed. Squadrons of 10–15 aircraft were used in crushing the revolt. On 16 July, two Turkish planes were downed and their pilots were killed by the Kurds. Aerial bombardment continued for several days and forced Kurds to withdraw to the height of 5,000 meters. By 21 July, bombardment had destroyed many Kurdish forts. During these operations, Turkish military mobilized 66,000 soldiers and 100 aircraft. The campaign against the Kurds was over by 17 September 1930. The Ararat rebellion was defeated in 1931, and Turkey resumed control over the territory.

=== Government measures after 1937 ===
After suppression of the last rebellion in 1937, Southeast Anatolia was put under martial law. In addition to destruction of villages and massive deportations, Turkish government encouraged Kosovar Albanians and Assyrians to settle in the Kurdish area to change the ethnic composition of the region. The measures taken by the Turkish Army in the immediate aftermath of the revolt became more repressive than previous uprisings. At times, villages and/or buildings were set on fire in order to repress the Kurdish population. In order to prevent the events from having a negative impact on Turkey's International image and reputation, foreigners were not allowed to visit the entire area east of Euphrates until 1965 and the area remained under permanent military siege till 1950. The Kurdish language was banned and the words "Kurds" and "Kurdistan" were removed from dictionaries and history books and Kurds were only referred to as "Mountain Turks".

The Turks, who had only recently been fighting for their own freedom, crushed the Kurds, who sought theirs. It is strange how a defensive nationalism develops into an aggressive one, and a fight for freedom becomes one for dominion over others

— Jawaharlal Nehru on the response to the Kurdish revolts in the early Turkish Republic.

=== Kurdistan Workers' Party insurgency (1978–2025) ===
Kurdish ethnic revival appeared in the 1970s when Turkey was racked with left-right clashes and the Marxist PKK was formed demanding a Kurdish state. PKK declared its objective as the liberation of all parts of Kurdistan from colonial oppression and establishment of an independent, united, socialist Kurdish state. It initially attracted the poorer segments of the Kurdish population and became the only Kurdish party not dominated by tribal links. PKK's chairman, Abdullah Öcalan, was proud of being from humble origins. It characterized its struggle mainly as an anti-colonial one, hence directing its violence against collaborators, i.e., Kurdish tribal chieftains, notables with a stake in the Turkish state, and also against rival organizations. The military coup in 1980 lead to a period of severe repression and elimination of almost all Kurdish and leftist organizations. The PKK, however, was the only Kurdish party that managed to survive and even grow in size after the coup. It initiated a guerrilla offensive with a series of attacks on Turkish military and police stations and due to its daring challenging of the Turkish army, gradually won over grudging admiration of parts of the Kurdish population. In the beginning of 1990, it had set up its own local administration in some rural areas. Around this time, PKK changed its goals from full Kurdish independence to a negotiated settlement with the Turkish government, especially after some promising indirect contacts with President Turgut Özal. After Özal's sudden death, the Turkish military intensified its operations against PKK bases. These measures succeeded in isolating the PKK from the civilians and reduced it to a guerrilla band operating in the mountains. In 1999, increased Turkish pressure on Syria led to Öcalan's expulsion and ultimate arrest by Turkish Maroon Berets in Kenya. A cooling down occurred, and a ceasefire was brokered in 2014 – but then due to the Siege of Kobane the conflict has restarted.

During the 1980s Turkey began a program of forced assimilation of its Kurdish population. This culminated in 1984 when the PKK began a rebellion against Turkish rule attacking Turkish military. Since the PKK's militant operations began in 1984, 37,000 people have been killed. The PKK has been continuing its guerrilla warfare in the mountains. As a result, the fighting is limited to approximately 3000 fighters.

=== Serhildan (1990–present) ===
The word serhildan describes several Kurdish public rebellions since the 1990s with the slogan "Êdî Bese" ("Enough") against the Turkish government. The first violent action by the populace against police officers and state institutions occurred in 1990 in the Southeast Anatolian town Nusaybin near the border to Syria. The rebellion in Nusaybin is the beginning of the serhildan, during the following days the riots initially widened to other cities of the province Mardin and to the neighboring provinces Batman, Diyarbakır, Siirt, Şanlıurfa and Şırnak, and later to other Eastern Anatolian provinces such as Bingöl, Bitlis, Hakkâri, Muş and Van, as well cities such as Ankara, Istanbul, İzmir and Mersin.

== See also ==
- Timeline of the Kurdistan Workers' Party insurgency (1978–2015)
- Timeline of the Kurdistan Workers' Party insurgency (2015–2025)
- List of Turkish operations in northern Iraq
- Turkish occupation of Iraqi Kurdistan
- Kurdistan Region–PKK conflict
- Azerbaijani–Kurdish conflict
- Kurdish–Turkish relations
- RAF Iraq Command
- Timeline of Kurdish uprisings
- List of modern conflicts in the Middle East

== Sources ==
- Arin, Kubilay Yado (26 March 2015). "Turkey and the Kurds – From War to Reconciliation?". Working Paper at Uc Berkeley's Center for Right-Wing Studies. UC Berkeley Center for Right Wing Studies Working Paper Series.
- Olson, Robert W (1989). The Emergence of Kurdish Nationalism and the Sheikh Said Rebellion, 1880-1925. Austin: University of Texas Press. ISBN 0-292-77619-5. Archived from the original on 17 September 2008.
- Olson, Robert (March 2000). "The Kurdish Rebellions of Sheikh Said (1925), Mt. Ararat (1930), and Dersim (1937–8): Their Impact on the Development of the Turkish Air Force and on Kurdish and Turkish Nationalism". Die Welt des Islams. 40 (1): 67–94. doi:10.1163/1570060001569893.
- van Bruinessen, Maarten Martinus (1978). Agha, Shaikh and State: On the Social and Political Organization of Kurdistan. Utrecht: University of Utrecht. ISBN 1-85649-019-X. (also London: Zed Books, 1992)
- Küpeli, Ismail (2019). "Machbarkeit der türkischen Nation: Diskursive Exklusion und physische Vernichtung als Säulen von nation building". In Marcus Hawel (ed.). Work in Progress: Doktorand*innen Jahrbuch 2019. Berlin: Rosa-Luxemburg-Stiftung. pp. 129–139. ISBN 978-3-96488-042-0.
- Eccarius-Kelly, Vera (2011). The Militant Kurds: A Dual Strategy for Freedom. Praeger. ISBN 978-0-313-36468-6.
