= Third Ararat Uprising =

- Part of Ararat Rebellion
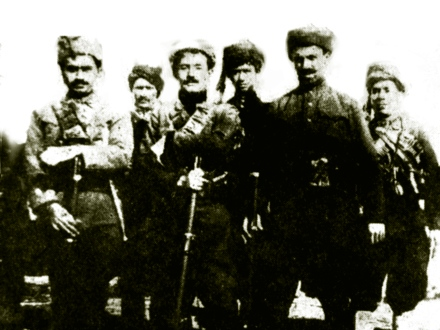
- From left to right: Halis Bey, Ihsan Nuri Pasha, Ferzende Bey
Date	October 1927 – September 17, 1930
Location	Karaköse Province (present day Ağrı Province), Turkey
Result	Turkish victory

Belligerents
Turkey	Republic of Ararat

Commanders and leaders
(Turkey) Gazi Mustafa Kemal	Ihsan Nuri

Strength
(Turkey) 80,000–66,000 soldiers and 100 aircraft	~5,000

Casualties and losses
Unknown number of soldiers, two aircraft	Heavy

The Third Ararat Operation or the Third Ararat Uprising, on June 11, 1930, the Turkish army responded to the uprising. The Hoybun organization urgently called for the support of other Kurds for this uprising. This uprising was led by a majority of Kurmanji Kurds. The Kurmanji Kurds outnumbered the Dersimites. Because the Turkish military responded to Hoybun's call immediately around Igdir, Sipan Mountain and Van, the support was very small. The Turks temporarily halted their offensive on Ararat.

== Background ==
The Ararat Rebellion began in 1927 when Kurdish rebels seized control of Mount Ararat and surrounding areas, proclaiming an independent Kurdish government. The Turkish Republic, under Mustafa Kemal Atatürk, viewed the rebellion as a direct threat to its territorial integrity and launched a series of military campaigns to crush it. After two earlier failed military offensives, the Turkish government planned a large-scale, coordinated attack in 1930, known as the Third Operation, to end the rebellion.

== Aftermath ==
The suppression of the Ararat Rebellion marked a turning point in Turkish efforts to consolidate control over its eastern provinces. Key outcomes included:

Loss of Kurdish Resistance: The rebellion's defeat weakened the Kurdish nationalist movement in the region for decades. Increased Militarization: The Ağrı region became heavily militarized, and strict policies were imposed to prevent future uprisings. Demographic Changes: Many Kurdish villages were destroyed, and surviving populations were forcibly relocated or assimilated.

== See also ==
- Republic of Ararat
- Zilan massacre
- Dersim rebellion
