= Zilan massacre =

Massacre against Kurds during the Ararat rebellion

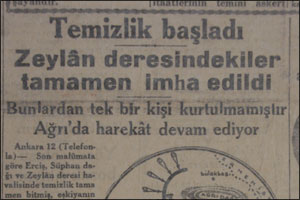
- In the daily Cumhuriyet dated 13 July 1930, Under the Headline of 'The rebels were destroyed in 5 days', the relevant part is quoted as follows: "Cleaning started, the ones at Zeylân valley were completely annihilated, None of them survived, operation at Ağrı are continuing. Ankara 12 (With telephone) ... According to latest information, the cleaning in districts of Erciş, Mount Süphan and Zeylân was completely finished, almost all of the bandits were destroyed..."
- Location: Turkey
- Date: 12–13 July 1930
- Target: Kurdish civilians
- Attack type: Massacre
- Deaths: 4,500 women and elderly (per Berliner Tageblatt); 15,000 Rebels (per Cumhuriyet)
- Perpetrator: Turkish Armed Forces
- Motive: Anti-Kurdish sentiment

The Zilan massacre (Note: Kurdish: Komkujiya Zîlanê, Turkish: Zilan Katliamı or Zilan Deresi Katliamı, etc.)) was the massacre of thousands of Kurdish civilians by the Turkish Land Forces in the Zilan Valley of Van Province on 12/13 July 1930, during the Ararat rebellion in Ağrı Province.

The massacre took place to the north of the town of Erciş on Lake Van. It was carried out by the IX Corps of the Third Army under the command of Ferik (Lieutenant General) Salih Omurtak. The number of people killed in the massacre ranges from 4,500 women and elderly to 15,000 rebels per Cumhuriyet.

== Background ==
After the Sheikh Said rebellion, on 8 September 1925, the Reform Council for the East (Turkish: Şark İslahat Encümeni) was established by Kemal Atatürk and it prepared the Report for Reform in the East (Turkish: Şark İslahat Raporu), which provided for special administrative arrangements for the Eastern areas and introduced the Inspector-General system. This plan forced Kurdish aristocrats and religious leaders to relocate to other parts of Turkey. On 17 July 1927, with the "Law on the Transfer of Certain People from Eastern Regions to the Western Provinces" (Turkish: Bazı Eşhasın Şark Menatıkından Garp Vilâyetlerine Nakillerine Dair Kanun), the target of the forced migration was extended.

On 5 October 1927, in Greater Lebanon, the Kurdish nationalist organization Xoybûn was founded by former members of other Kurdish nationalist organisations such as Kürdistan Teali Cemiyeti, Kürt Millet Fırkası, and Comite de Independence Kurde, together with Kurdish intellectuals who took refuge in Iraq, Iran, and Syria, with the help of former members of the Dashnaktsutyun. In 1927 Xoybûn (led by Celadet Alî Bedirxan, Kamuran Alî Bedirxan, Ekrem Cemilpaşa, Memdûh Selîm, and others) decided to promote Ihsan Nuri, a former officer in the Ottoman and Turkish armies, to general (pasha), and sent him to Erzurum with 20 comrades. They published a newspaper named Agirî and, on 8 October 1927, declared the independence of the Republic of Ararat. Also in October 1927, Xoybûn made appeals to the Great Powers and the League of Nations, and appointed Ibrahim Heski, who was one of the chieftains of Jalali tribe, as governor of Agrî province.

=== Cabinet decision ===
On 9 May 1928, the Turkish government enacted an amnesty law. Amnesty was offered to all oppositional Kurds willing to submit to the Kemalist government, and Kurdish nationalists were freed from prison. However, attempts by the Turkish government at initiating meaningful negotiations failed. The Turkish government then decided to negotiate directly with Ihsan Nuri Pasha, but this effort was also in vain.

On 29 December 1929, President Mustafa Kemal (Atatürk) led the cabinet meeting, with participation of the Chief of the General Staff Fevzi Çakmak and İbrahim Tali Öngören, the Inspector General of the First Inspectorate-General. A decision was adopted (cabinet decision No. 8692) to begin a military operation against Mount Ararat in June 1930.

=== Order of the General Staff ===
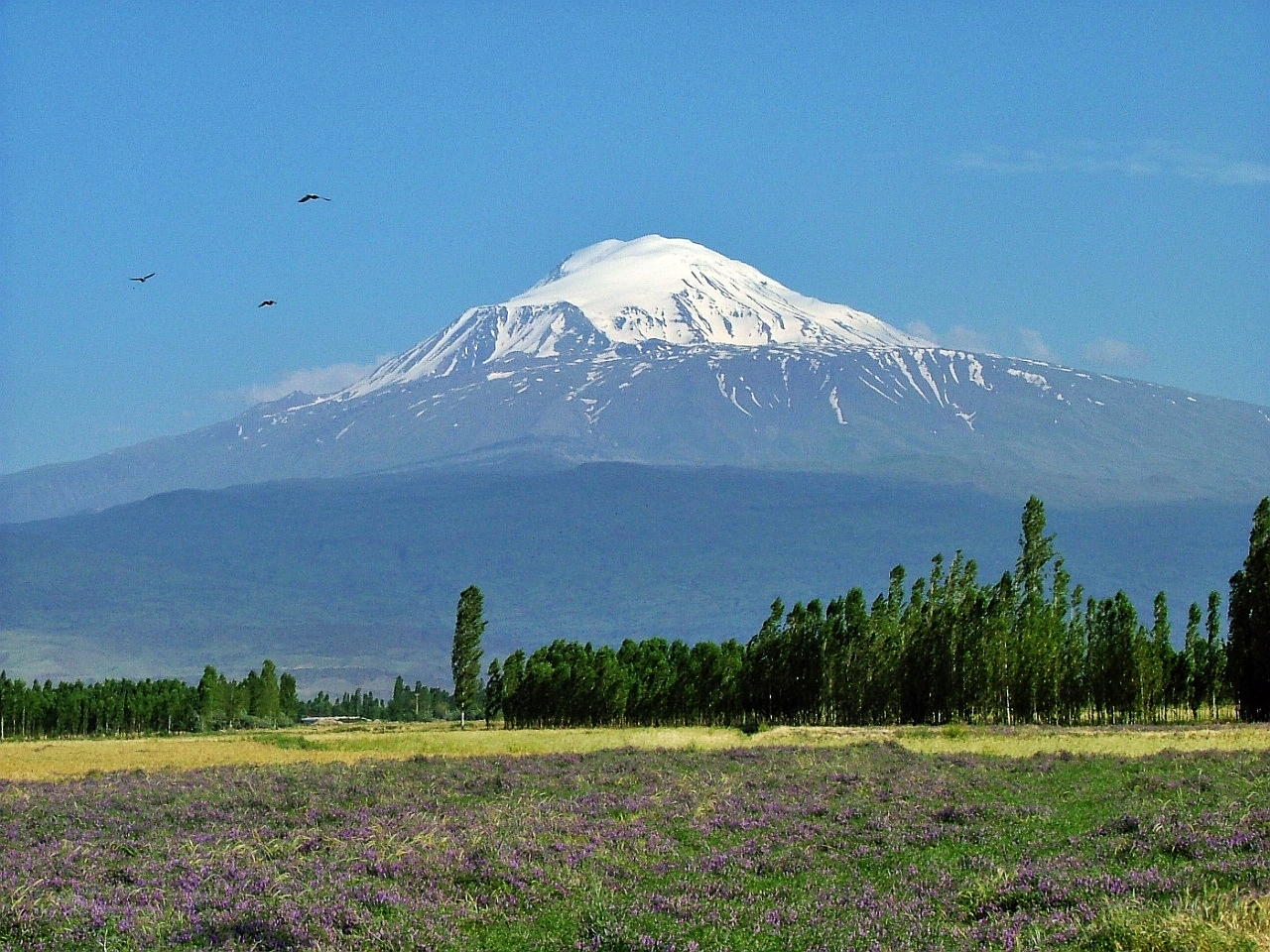
Mount Ararat from Iğdır.

On 7 January 1930, General Staff of the Republic of Turkey sent an order to IX Corps (as follows) with the text of the cabinet decision itself:

- Villages inhabited by Kurds between Bulakbaşı and Şıhlı Köyü and places of refuge will be occupied. And let rebels debar from livelihood bases.
- After cleaning the district of Kurds, follow towards the line of Ararat peak and establish garrisons in occupied territories.
- Only mobile gendarmerie forces will winter between 1930 and 1931. In district no residential areas, except needs for gendarmerie regiments, will not be left.
- In this wise, Kurds debarred from food and housing needs will be distributed or be forced to take refuge in Iran. In this case, problem will be solved with Iran.
- The operation will begin in the last week of June 1930 and before the harvest season.
- The commander of IX Corps will direct the military operation.

=== Postponement of the offensive against Mount Ararat ===
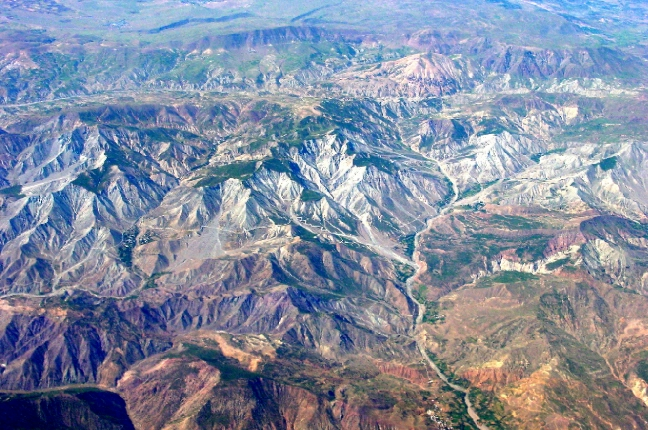
Mountains near Van.

On 18 March 1930 Salih (Omurtak) was appointed the commander of IX Corps. Armed hostilities were initiated by Turkish military against the Ararat insurgents on 11 June 1930. Xoybûn appealed for help for Kurds throughout Kurdistan. İhsan Nuri sent an offensive order to Îbrahîm Agha dated 18 June 1930. A Turkish Captain Zühtü (Güven), who was an officer of the 2nd Mobile Gendarmerie Battalion at Iğdır, got this order from a Kurdish rebel. There was wide response to the insurgents' appeal for help, and the Turks temporarily abandoned their offensive against Mount Ararat.

On 19–20 June 1930, hundreds of rebels, led by the sons of Kör Hüseyin Pasha (former commander of the North group of the Hamidiye regiments) and Emin Pasha's sons, crossed the border from Persia and cut the telegraph line between Çaldıran and Beyazit. More than one hundred of them raided the center of Zeylan district and the station of gendarmerie. They made their own tribesmen of the district join them. This Kurdish offensive, and offensives at Patnos and Çaldıran, would be named the Zeylan Rebellion (Zeylân İsyanı or Zeylân Ayaklanması) by the Turkish authority.

According to Salih's official report dated 2 July 1930, about the situation in the north of Lake Van, 350–400 rebels led by Kör Hüseyin's sons and Emin Pasha's sons were in the Patnos area with the support of the surrounding villages of Sofu Mustafa, Kâni, Yukarı Romik, Çakırbey, Gürgüre, Haçlı, Koru, Harabe Kürk, and Çavuş. About 400 rebels led by Seyit Resul were in the Zeylân area with the support of the surrounding villages of Şurik, Su Souk, Kadir Asker, Münevver, Sivik, Ağı, Dedeli, and Şeytan Ava. An unknown number of rebels led by Yusuf Abdal were in the Çaldıran area surrounded by the villages of Aşağı Çilli, Şeyh Rumi, Alikelle, Haçan, Kaymaz, Şeyh Sucu.

== Massacre ==
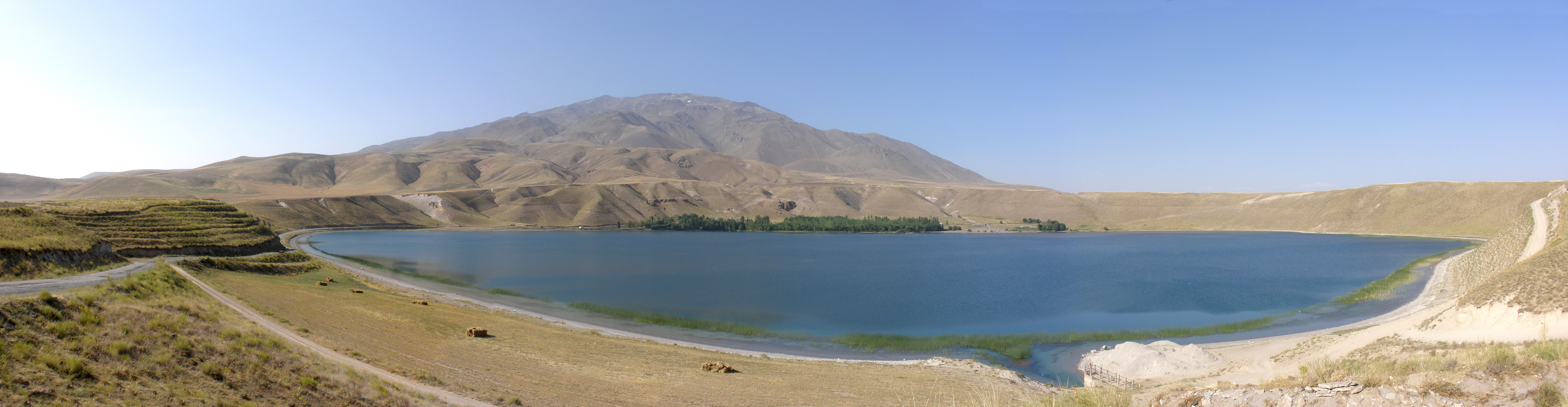
Mount Süphan from Lake Aygır.

The Turkish army used two corps (VII Corps and IX Corps) and 80 aircraft for the cleaning operation from 8 July 1930. Generally the date that the massacre took place was considered as 13 July 1930, but Yusuf Mazhar, who was the special correspondent of the daily Cumhuriyet (Turkey's most widely read daily paper in 1930–1940s), reported by telephone on 12 July 1930 "the cleaning in districts of Erciş, Mount Süphan and Zeylân was completely finished."

According to the daily Cumhuriyet dated 16 July 1930, about 15,000 rebels were killed and Zilan River was filled with dead bodies as far as its mouth.

On 15 July 1930, Ibrahim Tali Öngören, the general inspector of the First Inspectorate-General, explained that annihilation was performed by troops with people's help, more than thousand militias were lost, villagers who helped rebels were also annihilated.

The British Foreign Office reported "The conviction here is that the Turkish 'success' near Ergish and Zilan were really gained over a few armed men and a large percentage of non-combatants."

=== Witnesses ===
According to Nazi Erol, the wife of Şükrü (Erol) (eldest son of the chieftain of Bekiri tribe), her first child Salih and all of her women were killed. She survived the massacre because she was hidden under their corpses.

According to Mehmet Pamak's grandfather, thousands of people—men, women, children and elderly—were massacred by machine-gun fire, and blood flowed out of the valley for days. Pamak's aunt (a baby) and his 80-year-old great-grandmother were bayoneted to death.

According to Kakil Erdem, one of the living eyewitnesses of the Zilan massacre, thirty-five of his relatives were killed, and soldiers cut and opened the abdomen of a pregnant woman. Before his eyes, three of his relatives were scalped and two of his brothers were beaten to death.

== Aftermath ==
=== In Turkish media ===
The next morning's edition of Cumhuriyet, then a state-linked newspaper, described the outcome of the operation in no uncertain terms. "The sweeping began. All those in the Zilan Valley were exterminated, and none of them survived."

=== Cultural influences ===
Musa Anter, for the first time, learned about and discussed the massacres of the Kurds, such as the Zilan massacre of 1930, the Dersim massacre in 1938, and the Thirty-three bullets massacre, when he published a journal entitled Dicle Kaynağı (Tigris Spring) with three other friends from Dicle Student Dormitory in 1948.

Yaşar Kemal, one of Turkey's leading writers, learned about the Zilan Valley massacre during interviews in the 1950s and was influenced by the massacre. He described massacres in his novel entitled Deniz Küstü ("The Sea-Crossed Fisherman", 1978). The protagonist of the novel, Selim Balıkçı participated in the Ararat campaigns, was wounded in the face and transferred to Cerrahpaşa Hospital (İstanbul) for treatment.

=== Zilan massacre and censorship ===
In 2007, Ercan Öksüz and Oktay Candemir, journalists working for the Dicle News Agency, interviewed 94-year-old living eyewitness Kakil Erdem and published the interview with the title "Zilan Katliamı'nın Tanığı Konuştu" (Witness of Zilan Massacre Talks). The Van 2nd Criminal Court of First Instance tried the journalists for "inciting hatred and hostility". In 2009, each of them received a prison sentence of 18 months.
