= Bozan Shaheen Bey =

Kurdish tribal leader, politician, and nationalist (1890–1968)

- بوزان شاهين بك
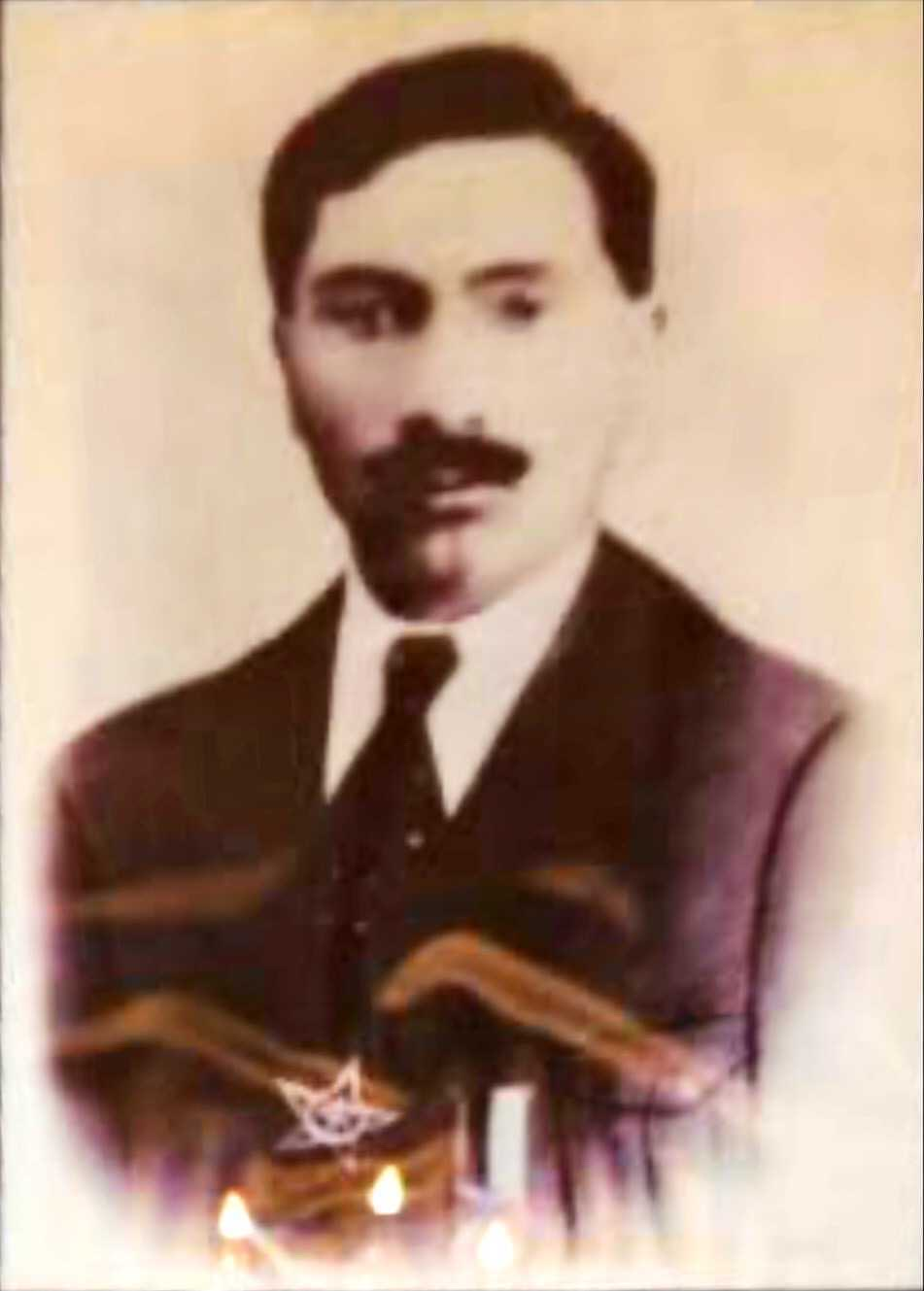
- Bozan Shaheen Bey in the 1930s
- Born: 1890; Suruç, Ottoman Empire
- Died: 1968 (aged 77–78); Kobani, Syrian Republic
- Occupations: Tribal leader, politician, nationalist activist
- Known for: Founding member of Xoybûn; Member of the Grand National Assembly of Turkey (1920–1923); Member of the People's Assembly of Syria (1936)
- Father: Şahin Bey
- Awards: Medal of Independence (Turkey)

Bozan Shaheen Bey (1890–1968) was a Kurdish tribal leader, politician, and nationalist. He was a founding member of the Kurdish nationalist organization Xoybûn, and served as a parliamentarian in both the early Turkish and Syrian legislative assemblies.

== Biography ==
=== Family and origins ===
Bozan Shaheen Bey was born into the Kurdish tribal confederation known as the Barazi clan. He was the son of tribal chief Şahin Bey, who governed a region spanning Suruç (in modern-day Turkey) and Kobani (in northern Syria). Bozan had several politically active brothers, including Mustafa "Hirço" Bey, Hacı Ahmed Bey, and Nafi Bey.

The family is believed to descend from Khalil al-Urfali, who settled in the Urfa region in the early 19th century. Bozan belonged to the “Mirani” branch of the clan, which held significant influence on both sides of the post-Ottoman border.

=== Education ===
Bozan studied in Istanbul at Mekteb-i Aşiret-i Humayun ("Imperial Tribal School") established by Sultan Abdul Hamid II to educate the sons of tribal elites from the empire’s eastern provinces. Some accounts suggest he later pursued short-term studies in France, although this remains unverified in academic records.

=== Political involvement in Turkey ===
Following the Ottoman Empire’s collapse, Bozan joined the Turkish National Movement under Mustafa Kemal Atatürk and helped lead resistance efforts against the French occupation in the Urfa region. He played a notable role in organizing tribal militias and disrupting French supply lines.

He was elected as a deputy for Urfa in the inaugural Grand National Assembly of Turkey in 1920, and re-elected in 1921 for Gaziantep. He was awarded the Medal of Independence for his service.

However, Bozan opposed the Misak-ı Millî (National Pact) adopted by Ankara, which denied Kurdish territorial autonomy. This dissent led to his condemnation in absentia and a death sentence issued by the early republican government.

=== Exile and Kurdish nationalist activism in Syria ===
In 1923, Bozan fled to Syria, then under French mandate, accompanied by his brother Mustafa Hirço and many members of their tribe. He settled in Kobani, which became a hub for Kurdish intellectual and political activity.

In 1927, he co-founded the nationalist organization Xoybûn (also spelled Khoyboun), alongside leading exiled Kurds including the Bedir Khan Beg family and others. The organization aimed to unite Kurdish efforts toward independence and supported the Ararat rebellion (1927–1930).

Bozan was tasked with launching a parallel offensive towards Urfa but refrained due to French opposition. He and his brother were later placed under surveillance and briefly put under house arrest in Aleppo.

During his exile, Bozan also became a cultural patron, offering protection and financial assistance to prominent Kurdish writers such as Cigerxwîn and Osman Sabri.

=== Political career in Syria ===
Under the French mandate’s limited political framework, Bozan Shaheen Bey was elected in 1936 to the People's Assembly of Syria as a deputy representing the district of Jarabulus. Local tradition also holds that he served as mayor of Kobani for a period.

He remained an advocate for Kurdish rights within the Syrian political system and was instrumental in organizing community representation.

=== Death and legacy ===
Bozan Shaheen Bey died in 1968 in Kobani. He had two wives and eight children. His descendants live today in Syria, Turkey, and the Kurdish diaspora in Europe.

== Legacy ==
Bozan is remembered as a complex figure in Kurdish history: initially a Turkish war hero, he later became a symbol of Kurdish self-determination. His leadership in Xoybûn, political mobilization in exile, and support for Kurdish culture secured his place as a revered historical figure among Kurds in northern Syria and southeastern Turkey.

== See also ==
- Xoybûn
- Kurdistan
- Ararat rebellion
- Kurds in Syria
- Kurdish nationalism
- French Mandate for Syria and the Lebanon
