= Memduh Selim Bey =

Kurdish politician (1889-1976)

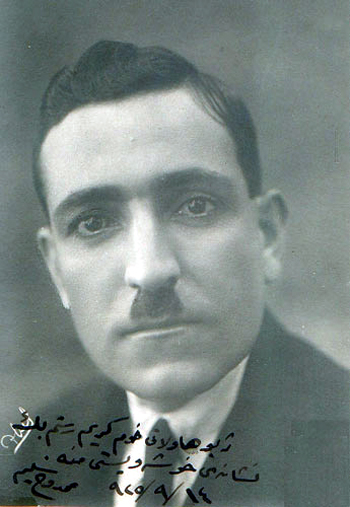
- Born: 1889; Van, Ottoman Empire
- Died: 1976 (aged 86–87) Damascus, Syria
- Allegiance: Xoybûn (1927-1946)
- Conflicts: Ararat rebellion

Memduh Selim Bey (1889-1976) was a Kurdish politician, writer and teacher, he is best known for being one of the founders of Xoybûn and the Kurdish Student Hêvî Society.

== Biography ==
He was born in Van in 1889. After completing his primary and secondary education in Van, he went to Istanbul for higher education and studied sociology and philosophy, and according to some sources he graduated from Mekteb-i Mülkiye.

In 1912, he was among the founding members of the Kurdish Student Hêvî Society, established in Istanbul to introduce Kurdish students to each other and to carry out cultural activities, and he served as the general secretary of the society. His articles were published in magazines such as Rojî Kurd and Jîn, which were published under the umbrella of this society. In these publications, he wrote articles on social issues, education, language and cultural topics.

After 1925, he left Turkey and went to Syria. He continued his political activities in Syria and Lebanon and played a role in the establishment of the Xoybûn society, which was founded in 1927.

Suffering from loneliness and financial difficulties in the last years of his life, Memduh Selim died in Damascus in 1976.
