= President of Kurdistan (disambiguation) =

President of Kurdistan may refer to:

- President of the Republic of Ararat
- President of the Republic of Mahabad
- President of the Iraqi Kurdistan Region
- President of Rojava
