= Osman Sabri =

Kurdish poet, writer and journalist

Osman Sabri or Osman Sebrî (1905–1993) was a Kurdish poet, writer and journalist.

== Biography ==
Sabri was born on 5 January 1905 in the village of Narince near Kâhta in the Ottoman Empire. He received his education with help from his uncle as he lost his father at the age of eight. Sabri was already interested in Kurdish history and poetry as a youngster. Both his family and he were involved in the failed Sheik Said Rebellion led by Kurdish religious leader Sheikh Said. The ones apprehended were tried. Two uncles of him were hung in Diyarbakır while he was imprisoned. After his release in 1928, he took refuge in Syria in 1929, where he got in contact with the leaders of Xoybûn. While in Syria, he got to know many Kurdish intellectuals such as Celadet Bedir Khan, Cegerxwîn, and Qedrîcan.

After the establishment of Republic of Ararat during the Ararat rebellion, he tried to join the revolt, but he was again imprisoned by the British authorities in Mosul and Baghdad. Although he was freed in 1935, the British forced him into exile to Madagascar one year later in 1936. He went to Lebanon in 1937, and again became involved in the Xoybûn and in the Kurdish publications in Beirut. He was employed by the French Mandate administration between 1944 and 1949, the year he was dismissed by the Ministry of the Interior. He also took part in founding the Kurdistan Democratic Party of Syria in 1957 and was elected as the secretary general of that party. Within the party, he was an adherent of the ideology of Mustafa Barzani.

== Works ==
He published many articles in different Kurdish journals, such as Hawar (1932), Ronahî (1943), Roja Nû (1943), Hêviya Welêt (in Europe, 1963), Çiya (in Europe, 1966), Hêvî (Paris, 1983), Berbang (Sweden, 1983), Roja Nû (Sweden, 1979). He published a book on the Latin-based Kurdish alphabet in 1954. His poetry book Bahoz (1956) was banned from import into and distribution in Turkey by a decision of the Council of Ministers dated 22 May 1957.

=== Books ===
1. Apo, “Gotinên xav nepijîn bê tav”, Germany, 1981.
2. Elîfbêya Tikuz, 1982.
3. Çar Leheng, Syria, 40 pp., 1984.
4. Bahoz û çend nivîsarên din, 68 pp., 1956 (banned in Turkey in 1957).
5. Elîfbeya Kurdî, 56 pp., Syria, 1955.
6. Derdên me (gotar û helbest)
7. Dîwana Osman Sebrî (Collection of Poems), 215 pp., Stockholm, 1998.
8. Bîranînên Osman Sebrî (Memoirs), 2003.

== See also ==
- List of Kurdish scholars
