= Ararat rebellion =

1930 Kurdish uprising in eastern Turkey

- Part of Kurdish rebellions in Turkey
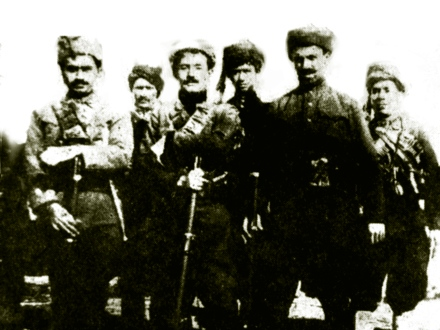
- From left to right: Halis Bey, Ihsan Nuri Pasha, Ferzende Bey
Date	October 1927 – September 1931
Location	Karaköse Province (present-day Ağrı Province), Turkey
Result	Turkish victory: Revolt suppressed
Territorial changes	Dissolution of the Republic of Ararat

Belligerents
Turkey	Republic of Ararat; Supported by: Armenian Revolutionary Federation

Commanders and leaders
(Turkey) Gazi Mustafa Kemal (Turkey) İsmet Bey (Turkey) Fevzi Pasha (Turkey) İbrahim Tali Öngören (Turkey) İzzettin Pasha (Turkey) Salih Pasha (Turkey) Salih Hulusi Pasha	Ihsan Nuri; Ibrahim Heski; Ferzende; Halis Öztürk

Units involved
Third Army: IX Corps; VII Corps	Xoybûn party

Strength
10,000–15,000 troops	5,000–8,000

Casualties and losses
- 4,500–47,000

The Ararat rebellion, also known as the Ağrı rebellion (Turkish: Ağrı ayaklanmaları or Ağrı isyanı), was a 1930 uprising by the Kurds of Ağrı Province, in eastern Turkey, against the Turkish government. The leader of the guerrilla forces during the rebellion was Ihsan Nuri of the Jibran branch of the Jalali tribe.

== Background ==
In 1926, before the Ararat revolt, Ibrahim Heski led the Hesenan, Jalali and Haydaran tribes in a rebellion (May 16–June 17, 1926). On May 16, the Kurdish forces fought against the 28th Infantry Regiment of the 9th Infantry Division of the Turkish army and a Gendarmerie regiment in the Demirkapı region. The Turkish forces were defeated and the scattered 28th Regiment had to retreat towards Doğubeyazıt. On June 16/17, Heski and his forces were surrounded by the 28th and 34th regiments of the Turkish army and had to retreat over Yukarı Demirkapı to Iran. The rebellion was also supported by the Armenian Dashnak Party.

== Xoybûn ==
On June 11, 1930 armed responses under the leadership of Salih Pasha to the rebellion were initiated by the Turkish military against the Ağrı insurgents. According to Wadie Jwaideh, Xoybûn, the Kurmanci Kurdish nationalist organization co-ordinating the rebellion, urgently appealed for help from Kurds. It was a Kurdish rebellion by mostly Kurmancî Kurds, which greatly outnumbered the Qizilbash of Dersim. That is why, much to the Turks' dismay, Xoybûn's appeal was answered on a wide front by a counteroffensive at Mount Tendürek, Iğdır, Erciş, Mount Süphan, Van and Bitlis, forcing the Turks to temporarily abandon their offensive against Ağrı. In July, the Xoybun decided to send reinforcements from Syria to the revolt in the night from August 4–5. Five separate groups should have been led by Hadjo Agha, Kadri Cemilpasha, Khamil, the son of Ibrahim Pasha, Rassoul Agha Mohammed from the Bohtan area and Mustafa and Bozan Sahin. But the plan was not executed as planned, and three reinforcements returned after they noticed their men's exhaustion.

=== Last offensive against Mount Ararat ===
By the end of summer 1930 the Turkish Air Force was bombing Kurdish positions around Mount Ararat (Turkish: Ağrı Dağı) from all directions. According to Gen. Ihsan Nuri, the military superiority of the Turkish Air Force demoralized Kurds and led to their capitulation.

During the insurrection, the Turkish Air Force also bombed several Kurdish tribes and villagers. For instance, Halikanli and Herki tribes were bombed on July 18 and August 2, respectively. Rebel villages were continually bombed from August 2–29. From June 10–12 Kurdish positions were extensively bombed, and this forced the Kurds to retreat to higher positions around Mount Ararat. On July 9 the newspaper Cumhuriyet reported that the Turkish Air Force was "raining down" Mount Ararat with bombs. Kurds, who escaped the bombings, were captured alive. On July 13, the rebellion in Zilan was suppressed. Squadrons of 10–15 aircraft were used in crushing the revolt. On July 16, two Turkish planes were downed. Aerial bombardment continued for several days and forced Kurds to withdraw to the height of 5,000 m (16,000 ft). By July 21, bombardment had destroyed many Kurdish forts. During these operations, Turkish military mobilized 66,000 soldiers (contrary to this Robert W. Olson gives the number of 10,000–15,000 troops in another work, other works state these numbers as well) and 100 aircraft. The last reported major offensive by the Kurds was directed at Van on September 2. The rebels were gradually crushed by the superior numbers of the Turkish military. The campaign against the Kurds was over by September 17, 1930.

The insurrection was defeated in 1931, and Turkey resumed control over the territory.

== Aftermath ==
Because the border between Turkey and Persia ran up the side of Lesser Ararat to its peak, Turkey was unable to stop Kurdish fighters from crossing the border at that location. To solve this problem Turkey demanded that it be ceded the entire mountain. On January 23, 1932, Persia and Turkey signed the Agreement related to the fixing of the frontier between Persia and Turkey (official name in French "Accord relatif à la fixation de la ligne frontière entre la Perse et la Turquie") in Tehran. Turkey received total control over the Lesser Ararat and Ağrı Mountains and territory between the Armenian village of Guirberan and Kuch Dagh. As compensation, Persia gained ninety square miles in the neighbourhood of Qotur (قطور).

The commander of the rebellion documented the role of the Turkish air force in defeating the Ağrı revolt in his book entitled La Révolte de L'Agridagh (The Mount Ararat revolt).

== Cultural influences ==
- Dağları Bekleyen Kız ("The Girl who is waiting for the Mountains", 1968, film)

== See also ==
- Republic of Ararat
- Zilan Massacre
- Dersim rebellion
- Kurdish rebellions
- List of modern conflicts in the Middle East

== Bibliography ==
- Olson, Robert (2000). "The Kurdish Rebellions of Sheikh Said (1925), Mt. Ararat (1930), and Dersim (1937–8): Their Impact on the Development of the Turkish Air Force and on Kurdish and Turkish Nationalism". Die Welt des Islams. 40 (1): 67–94. doi:10.1163/1570060001569893. JSTOR 1571104.
- Cağaptay, Soner (2006). Islam, Secularism and Nationalism in Modern Turkey: Who is a Turk?. Routledge. ISBN 978-1-134-17448-5.
