= Doğubayazıt =

- Municipality
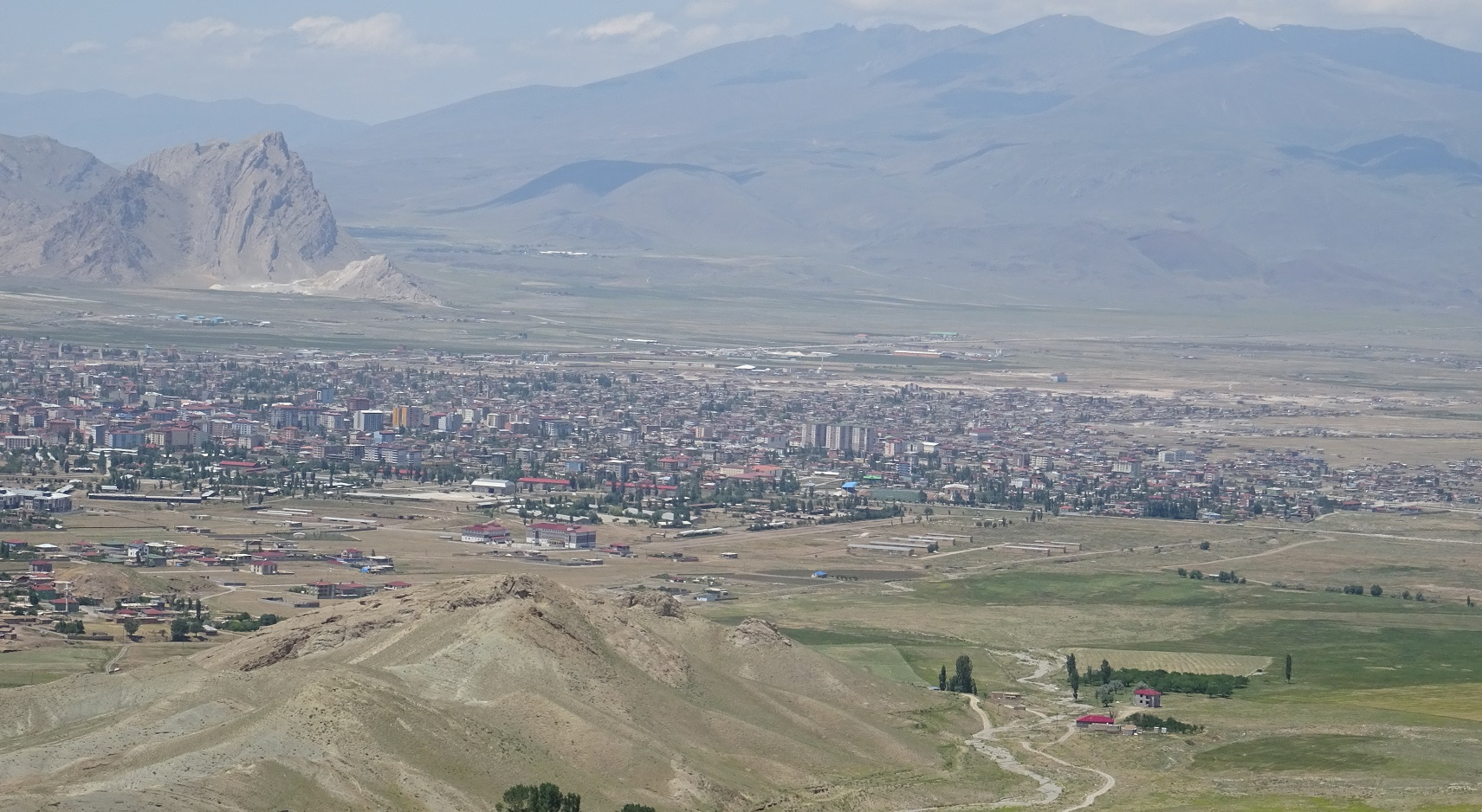
- Doğubayazıt from Ishak Pasha Palace

- Logo

- Location within Turkey
- Coordinates: 39°32′50″N 44°05′00″E
- Country: Turkey
- Province: Ağrı
- District: Doğubayazıt

Government
  - Mayor: Kenan Alkan (DEM Party)
- Population (2021): 80,061
- Time zone: UTC+3 (TRT)
- Website: www.dogubayazit.bel.tr

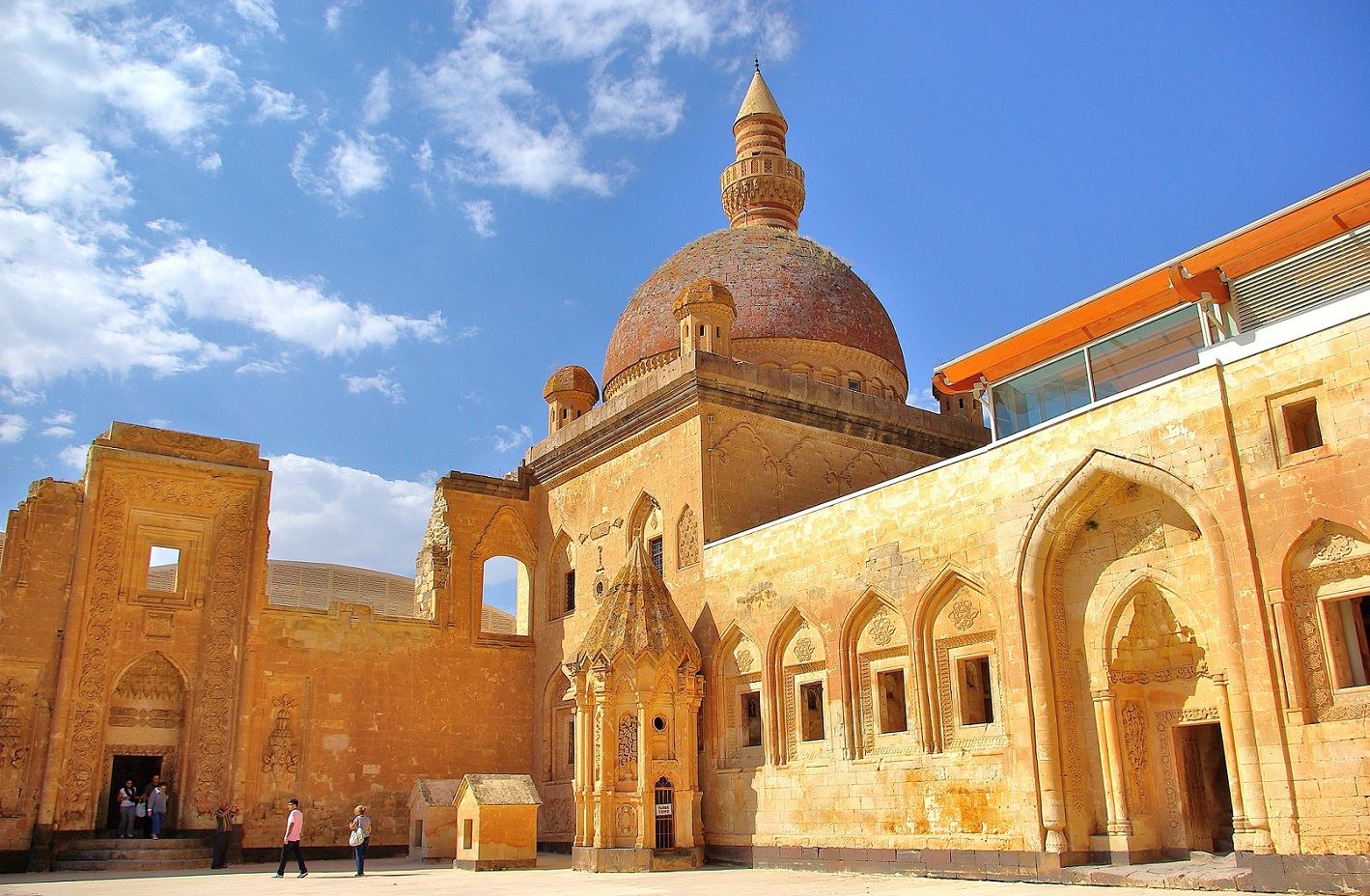
Ishak Pasha Palace near Doğubayazıt

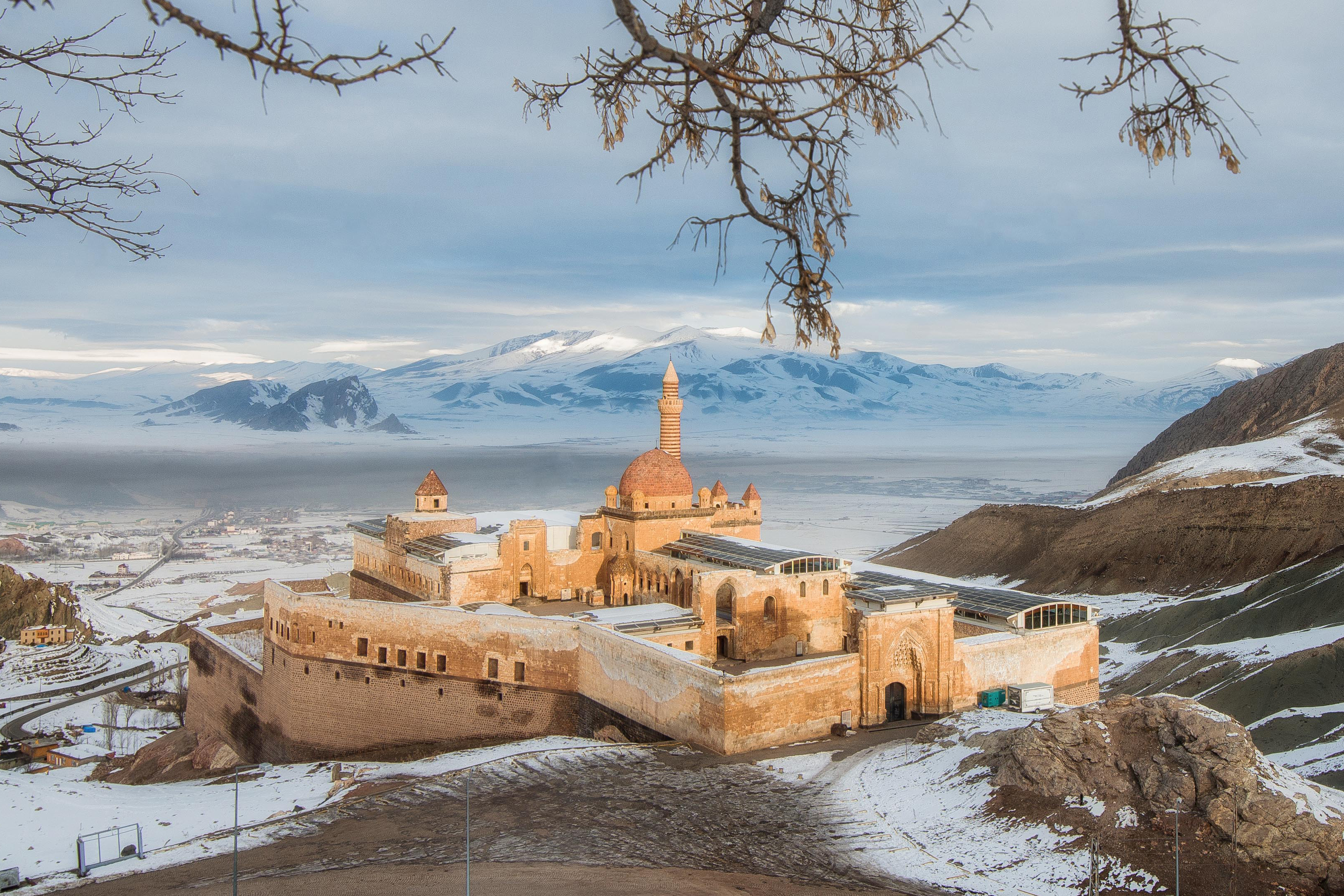
Aerial view of İshakpasa Palace

Doğubayazıt (Kurdish: Bazîd; Armenian: Պայազատ, romanized: Payazat or Դարոյնք, Daruynk) is a town in Ağrı Province of Turkey, near the border with Iran. Its elevation is 1625 m. It is the seat of Doğubayazıt District. Its population is 80,061 (2021). Also known as Kurdava, the town was the capital of the self-declared Republic of Ararat, a short-lived Kurdish state centered in the Ağrı Province. It has a Kurdish majority.

== History ==
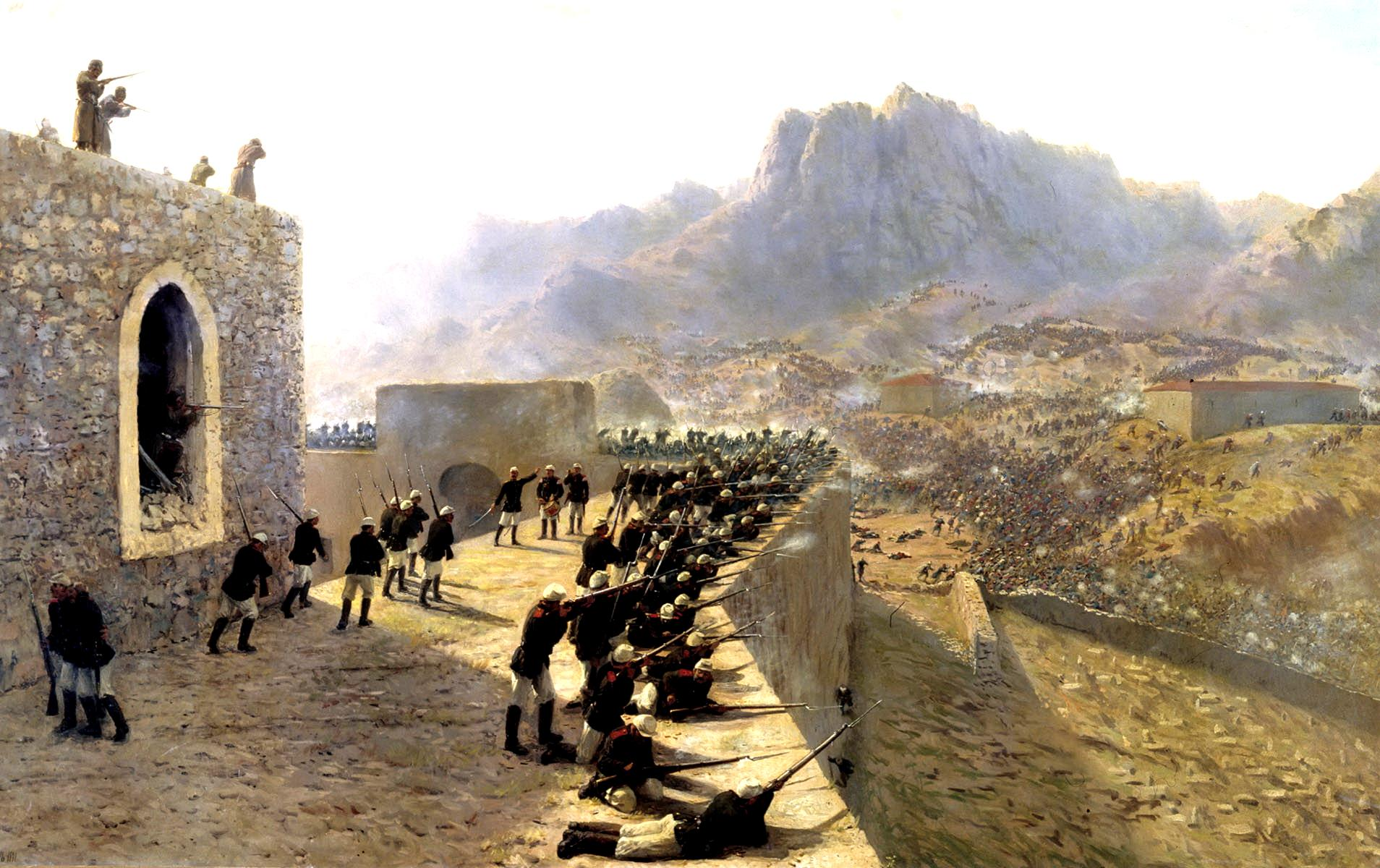
Defence of Doğubayazıt during the Russo-Turkish War (1877–78) by Lev Lagorio

For most of the periods described here, Doğubayazıt was a larger and more important settlement than the present-day provincial capital Ağrı, not least because it is located at the Iranian border crossing.

The area has a long history, with monuments dating back to the time of the Kingdom of Urartu (over 2700 years ago). Before the Ottoman Empire the site was referred to by its Armenian name Daruynk (written as Դարույնք in Armenian). In the 4th century the Sasanians failed to capture the Armenian stronghold and royal treasury at Daroynk. Princes of the Bagratid dynasty of Armenia resided at Daroynk and rebuilt the fortress into its present configuration with multiple baileys and towers carefully integrated into the ascending rock outcrop. When King Gagik I Artsruni reoccupied the fortress ca.922 A.D. it became the seat of a bishop. It was subsequently conquered and reconquered by Persians, Armenians, Byzantines, and Seljuks all of whom would have used the plain to rest and recoup during their passages across the mountains. Turkish peoples arrived in 1064, but were soon followed by the Mongols and further waves of Turks. The castle of Daroynk was repaired many times throughout this history, although it is now named after the Turkish warlord Celayırlı Şehzade Bayazıt Han who ordered one of the rebuildings (in 1374). Ultimately, the town itself was renamed Beyazit in the 16th century.

From the time of the Safavids, the area was ruled by Turkic-speaking generals, later including the Ottoman general İshakpaşa, who built the palace that still bears his name.

The town saw fighting in the Ottoman–Persian War (1821–1823) when in 1821 commander-in-chief Abbas Mirza of Qajar Iran occupied the town, as well as when it was attacked by Russia later in 1856, and taken by the Russians during the Russo-Turkish War (1877–1878). When the Russians retreated many of the local Armenians left with them to build New Beyazit (now Gavar at Armenia) on the shore of Lake Sevan.

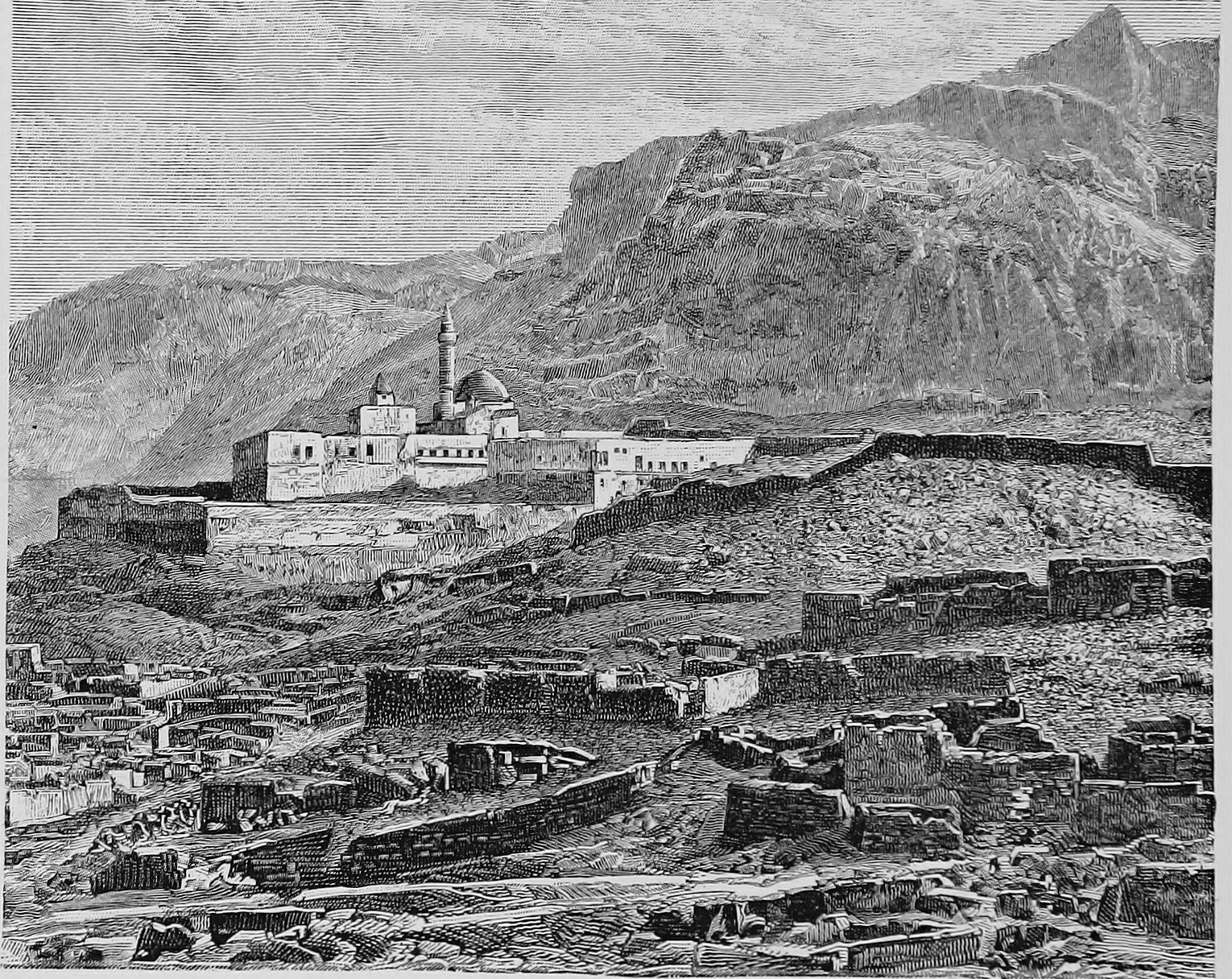
Mosque and ruined quarter.

Doğubayazıt was further ravaged during World War I and the subsequent Turkish War of Independence.

Starting in 1920, the area began producing sulphur.

The widely dispersed village of Bayazit, was originally an Armenian settlement and populated by Kurds in 1930 and Yazidis from the Serhed region. But in 1930 the Turkish Army destroyed it in response to the Ararat Rebellion. A new town was built in the plain below the old site in the 1930s (hence the new name "Doğubayazıt", which literally means "East Beyazıt").

Doğubayazıt was the capital of the Kurdish Republic of Ararat led by Ibrahim Haski and Ihsan Nuri of the Xoybûn organization between 1927 and 1930. The town was thus dubbed the provisional capital of Kurdistan and was subsequently presented to the League of Nations and the Great Powers as the center of an independent Kurdish state.

In January 2006, Doğubayazıt was the centre of a H5N1 bird flu outbreak. Four children died from the disease after playing with chicken carcasses. 75,000 chickens in Doğubayazıt and in surrounding villages were killed as a precaution.

== Politics ==
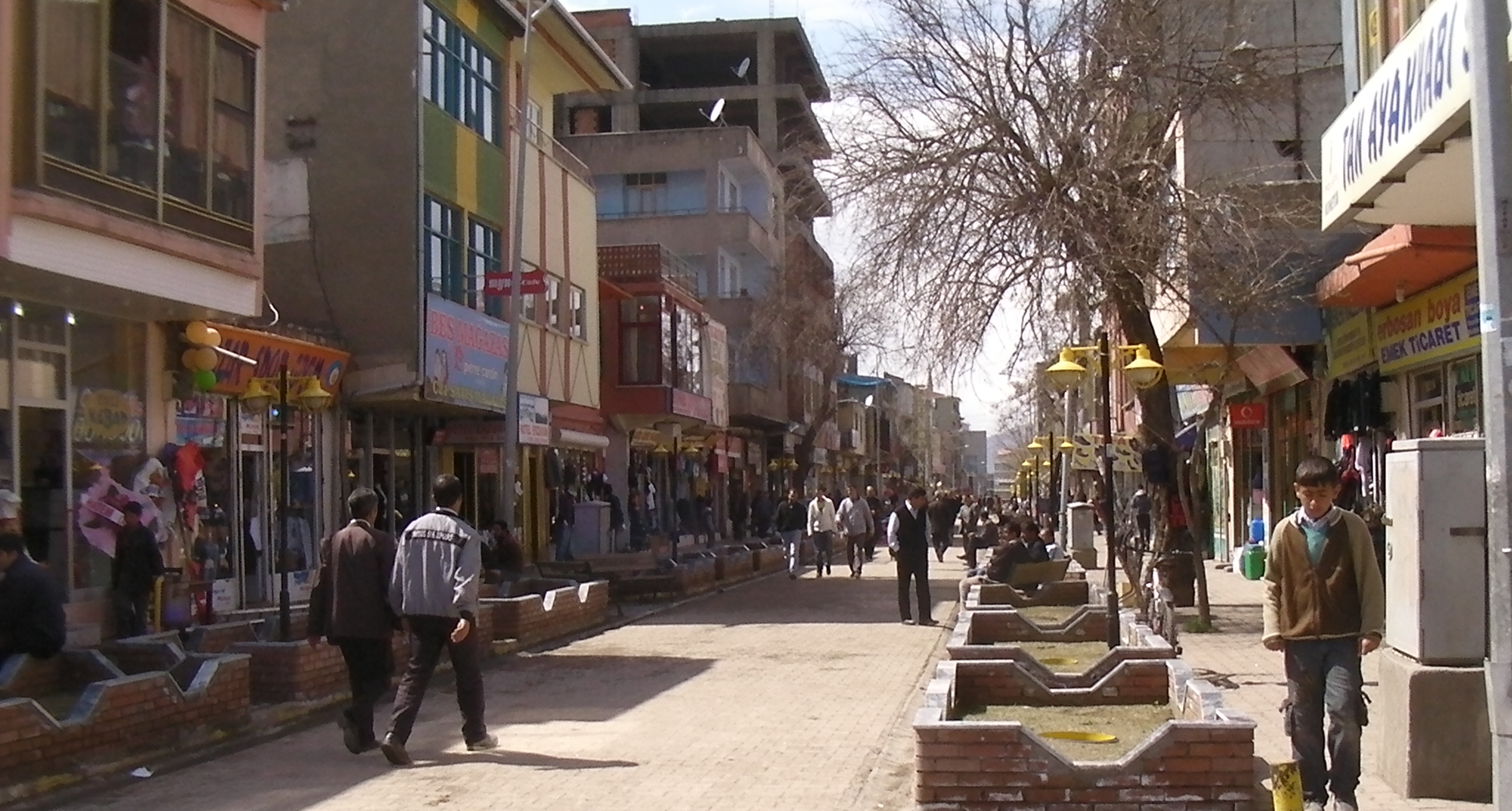
İsmail Beşikçi Avenue

In the local elections in March 2019, Yıldız Acar was elected Mayor of the Peoples' Democratic Party (HDP).

== Sports ==
The Doğubayazıtspor football club plays in the lower divisions of the Turkish football league. It played in the Turkish Third League for three seasons.

== Geography ==
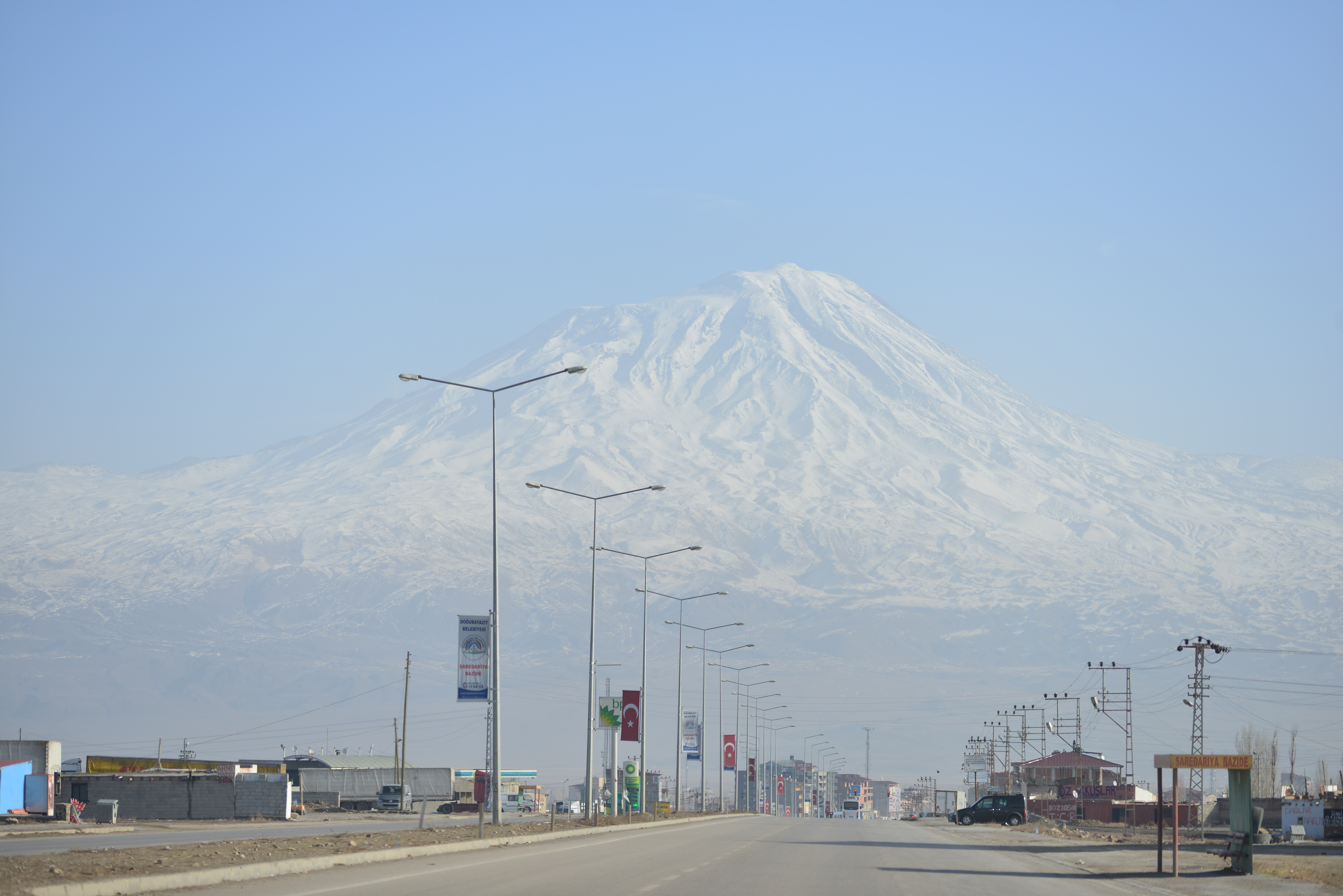
View of Doğubayazıt and Mount Ararat

Doğubeyazıt district center stays in the south of the Aras Mountains. The town of Doğubayazıt is a settlement with a long history. It lies 15 km southwest of Mount Ararat, 93 km east of the city of Ağrı and 35 km from the Iranian border. The town stands on a plain surrounded by some of Turkey's highest peaks including: Ararat (5,137 m), Little Ararat (3,896 m), Tendürek Dağı (3,533 m), Kaletepe (3,196 m) Arıdağı (2,934 m) and Göllertepe (2,643 m). Kizil Mountain at 2,730 m is two kilometers east of the town.

=== Climate ===
The climate on the plain is hot and dry in summer, cold and somewhat snowy in the winter; it is classified as a humid continental climate (Köppen: Dfa), transitioning to a cold semi-arid climate (Köppen: BSk).

Climate data for Doğubayazıt (1991–2020)
Month	Jan	Feb	Mar	Apr	May	Jun	Jul	Aug	Sep	Oct	Nov	Dec	Year
Mean daily maximum °C (°F)	0.5 (32.9)	2.5 (36.5)	8.2 (46.8)	14.7 (58.5)	19.8 (67.6)	25.3 (77.5)	29.3 (84.7)	29.7 (85.5)	25.0 (77.0)	17.9 (64.2)	9.4 (48.9)	2.8 (37.0)	15.5 (59.9)
Daily mean °C (°F)	−4.4 (24.1)	−2.6 (27.3)	3.0 (37.4)	9.0 (48.2)	13.7 (56.7)	18.7 (65.7)	22.6 (72.7)	22.8 (73.0)	17.8 (64.0)	11.3 (52.3)	3.7 (38.7)	−1.9 (28.6)	9.5 (49.1)
Mean daily minimum °C (°F)	−8.9 (16.0)	−7.1 (19.2)	−1.7 (28.9)	3.5 (38.3)	7.5 (45.5)	11.5 (52.7)	15.3 (59.5)	15.3 (59.5)	10.1 (50.2)	5.2 (41.4)	−1.2 (29.8)	−6.2 (20.8)	3.7 (38.7)
Average precipitation mm (inches)	18.36 (0.72)	19.58 (0.77)	27.15 (1.07)	41.39 (1.63)	53.71 (2.11)	39.37 (1.55)	23.63 (0.93)	14.51 (0.57)	18.51 (0.73)	36.31 (1.43)	26.3 (1.04)	21.1 (0.83)	339.92 (13.38)
Average precipitation days (≥ 1.0 mm)	3.9	4.5	6.0	7.4	9.9	6.9	4.5	3.5	4.2	5.7	5.3	4.8	66.6
Average relative humidity (%)	71.2	69.4	62.9	59.3	58.3	51.8	47.9	45.7	49.2	61.2	67.4	71.7	59.6
Source: NOAA

== Places of interest ==
- Mount Ararat — 15 km from Doğubayazıt
- Ishak Pasha Palace — completed in 1784 on a hill to the south of town.
- The castle and mosque of Old Beyazit — first built by the Urartu but which bear traces of many civilisations
- The geological formation of "Durupınar site" — 16 km southeast of town and promoted by some believers as the petrified ruins of Noah's Ark
- Lake Balık — a lake in a lava bed, 60 km from Doğubayazıt, near Taşlıçay
- The Ice Cave — on the side of Little Ararat near the village of Hallaç
- The 900BC Urartu temple and palace — ruins on the hill of Giriktepe
- The ancient Armenian monastery

== Notable people ==
- Mahmud Bayazidi (1797-1859), Kurdish philosopher and polymath from Bayazid in the Ottoman Empire.
- Ibrahim Heski (?-1931), Kurdish Politician
- Celal Yardımcı (1911-1986) lawyer and politician
- Selahattin Beyazıt (1932-2022), businessman
- Ahmet Arvasi (1932-1988), writer and philosopher
- Kaya Özcan (b. 1945), Wrestler
- Yıldız Tilbe (b. 1966), Turkish singer of Kurdish descent and one of the best-selling musical artists in Turkey
- Ümit Şamiloğlu (b. 1980), artistic gymnast and part of the national team

== International relations ==
Doğubayazıt is twinned with:

- Eilat, Israel
- Podgorica, Montenegro
- Montevideo, Uruguay
- Kitwe, Zambia
- Lusaka, Zambia
- Bulawayo, Zimbabwe
- Kosovska Mitrovica, Serbia
- Gothenburg, Sweden
- Karlstad, Sweden
- Timbuktu, Mali
- Bergen, Norway
- Turku, Finland
- Saarbrücken, Germany
- N'Djamena, Chad
- Esbjerg, Denmark
