= Ekrem Cemilpaşa =

Turkish politician

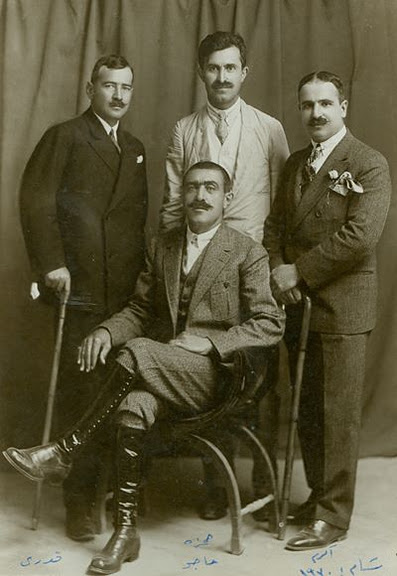
Ekrem Cemilpaşa (1st on the right in the back row) with Kadri Cemilpaşa, Müksü Hamza and Haco Agha

Ekrem Cemilpaşa or Ekrem Cemil Paşa (Burc) or Ekrem Cemilpaşazade (22 February 1891, Diyarbakır – 31 December 1973, Damascus) was a Kurdish politician and officer.

== Early life and education ==
Ekrem Cemilpaşa was born in 1891 to Kasım Bey, a member of the Cemilpaşazade family, one of the important Kurdish families in Diyarbakır. Ekrem Cemilpaşa attended the military school in Diyarbakir and followed up on his education in Istanbul. Cemilpaşa was able to study mathematics in Switzerland from 1913 onwards, to where he was sent to by his father. As he returned from Europe to Istanbul, he founded Hevî, an association for Kurdish students.

== Diplomatic career ==
As World War I began, Ekrem Cemilpaşa was called to defend the Ottoman Empire. After the end of the war, he returned to Diyarbakır, where he was one of the founders of the Society for the Rise of Kurdistan, and was in charge of the publication of the Jîn magazine. He attempted to gain the support of the British diplomats for the creation of an independent Kurdistan, but his approach was not awarded. Following the suppression of the Sheikh Said Rebellion, he was amongst the 500 Kurdish notables who were deported from Diyarbakır. Later he was arrested and sentenced to 10 years imprisonment. In prison in Kastamonu, he taught other Kurdish prisoners French, but as he wanted to teach also Kurdish, it was forbidden. He was released from prison in 1929 and left Turkey for Syria with his cousins Kadri, Mehmed and Bedri Cemilpaşa. In Syria he joined the Xoybûn, and was elected its secretary general between 1939 and 1944. He stayed in Syria until his death in 1973.
