= Ibrahim Heski =

Kurdish Politician

Ibrahim Heski (Ibrahim Pasha Haski Tello)
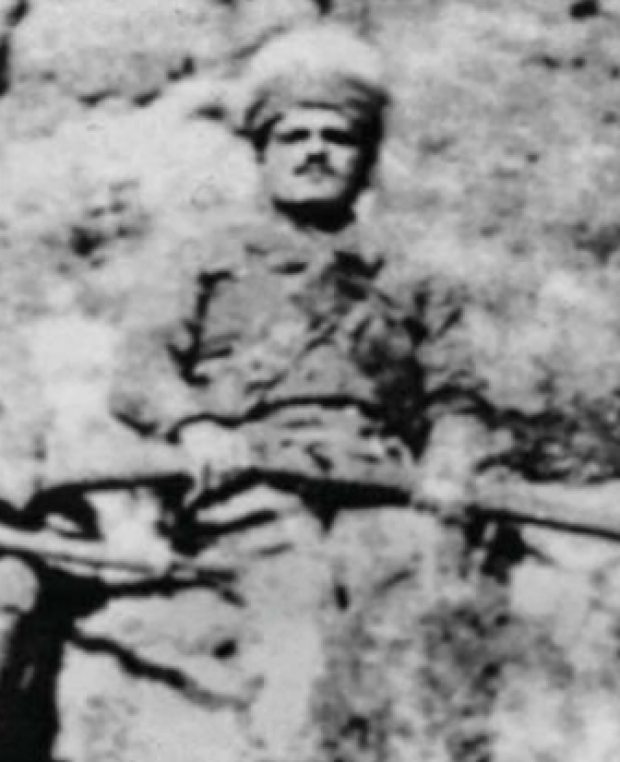
- Born: 1877; Diyadin, Ottoman Empire (now in Turkey)
- Died: July 25, 1931 (aged 53–54); Siah Cheshmeh, Iran
- Cause of death: Killed in action during the Maku Rebellion
- Occupations: Soldier, politician
- Known for: President of the Republic of Ararat, leader of Kurdish rebellions
- Political party: Xoybûn
- Movement: Kurdish independence movement
- Children: Ilhami, Omer, Davut (sons)
- Parent(s): Hesk (father), Têlî (mother)
- Relatives: Ahmed, Eyub (brothers)

Ibrahim Heski or Ibrahim Pasha Haski Tello (Kurdish: Biroyê Heskê Têlî; 1877, Diyadin – July 25, 1931, Siah Cheshmeh, Iran) was a Kurdish soldier, politician and president of the Kurdish Republic of Ararat. He was from the Jalali tribe.

== Life ==
His father's name is Hesk and mother's name is Têlî. He was a member of the Hesesori clan which is one of the branches of the Jalali tribe. Different sources mentioned him as "Ibrahim Agha", "Ibrahim Pasha", "Heskizâde Ibrahim", "Bırho", "Bro Haski Tello", "Ibro Haski Talu" and so on. British author and adventurer Rosita Forbes described him as the hero of the region was a wild and gallant freebooter called Ibrahim Agha Huske Tello. During World War I, he fought against Russian troops in Doğubayazıt.

=== First Ararat Rebellion ===
In 1925, he participated in the Sheikh Said Rebellion. And after the failure of the rebellion, he fled to Mount Ararat. In 1926, he commanded Hesenan, Jalali, Haydaran tribes and started the First Ararat Rebellion (May 16 - June 17, 1926). On 16 May, Kurdish forces fought against the 28th Infantry Regiment of the 9th Infantry Division of Turkish Army and a Gendarmerie regiment in Demirkapı region. The Turkish troops were defeated and a scattered 28th Regiment had to retreat towards Doğubeyazıt. On June 16/17, Ibrahim and his forces were surrounded by the 28th and 34th regiment, but they managed to evade capture and escape over Yukarı Demirkapı to Iran. Ibrahim and his forces did not aid Simko Shikak in his October 1926 revolt against Iran.

=== Republic of Ararat ===
On October 28, 1927, Xoybûn proclaimed the Independent Kurdistan and Ibrahim became the President of the Republic of Ararat. Before that, he was appointed the governor of the Agirî Province of Kurdistan by Xoybûn. His sons Ilhami, Omer, Davut and his brothers Ahmed, Eyub participated in the Ararat rebellion. Ahmed was killed in action and their 100-year-old mother was shot and killed by the Turkish Army during the Zilan massacre in July 1930. After the suppression of the Ararat rebellion, he retreated with his men to Iran.

== Maku Rebellion and death ==
In 1931, intense fighting broke out in the vicinity of Maku between the Iranian army and local rebel Kurds over the killing of Simko Shikak. The 2nd Brigade of Azerbaijan Division commanded by Colonel Mohammad Ali Khan engaged and Colonel Kalb Ali Khan was sent from Tabriz and Ardabil with reinforcements. On July 25, while fighting in the vicinity of Qara Aineh, the Persian Colonel Kalb Ali Khan was killed in action and Kurds lost three or four important leaders, including Ibrahim and his brother who were killed by the Persian troops.
