= Halis Öztürk =

Turkish politician (1899–1977)

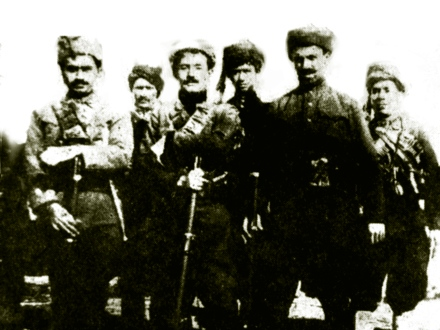
From left to right: Sipkanlı Halis Bey, Ihsan Nuri Pasha, Hasenanlı Ferzende Bey

Halis Öztürk (Kurdish: Xalis Begê Sîpkî, Turkish: Sipkanlı Halis Bey, 1899 in Tutak, Turkey - 24 September 1977 Kayseri) was a Kurdish chieftain and Turkish politician.

== Life ==
Halis was born in the Tutak Kazası of Bayazıt Sancağı, Erzurum Vilayeti (present day; Tutak District of Ağrı Province), as the son of Abdulmejid Bey, who was the chieftain of Sipkan tribe and one of the commanders of the Hamidiye Cavalry Regiments. He engaged in agriculture.

=== Ararat Rebellion ===
In 1927, when the Ararat rebellion broke out, he joined in it and played an active role to the end of rebellion. According to Mehmet Ali Kışlalı, some sources mentioned that he was one of the prominent members who started the Ararat rebellion, and he was arrested and escaped while being transferred from Erzurum to Trabzon. He participated in the peace negotiation with the representative of the Republic of Turkey, as a member of delegation of the Republic of Ararat. After the Ararat rebellion was suppressed, he defected to Iran.

=== Deputy ===
After he returned to Turkey, taking advantage of an amnesty, he was elected a deputy representing Ağrı Province for the Democrat Party in the 9th (1950–1954), 10th (1954–1957) and 11th (1957–1960) Grand National Assembly of Turkey.

=== Coup ===
After the coup d'état on 27 May 1960, he was arrested and tried at the special court of Yassıada. Because he knew very little Turkish language, he gave his plea in "mix language" of Kurdish and Turkish. The accusation of the public prosecutor was the violation of and disregarding the constitution. He replied Mr. judge, I swear to God, if I've known that there was the constitution under our feet, I wouldn't have trampled on it.

The Yassıada trials sentenced him to ten years in prison for the violation of the constitution. Abdülmelik Fırat, his dormmate in Yassıada and later Kayseri, describes him in his memories named Fırat Mahzun Akar as being clever and witty. Samet Ağaoğlu, another suspect of in the Yassıada trials, wrote in his memoirs named Marmara'da Bir Ada how Halis Öztürk replied to all contemptuous questions with witty answers in his local dialect. He died on 24 September 1977. He had three wives, thirteen daughters and seven sons.
