= Little Ararat =

Sixth tallest peak in Turkey

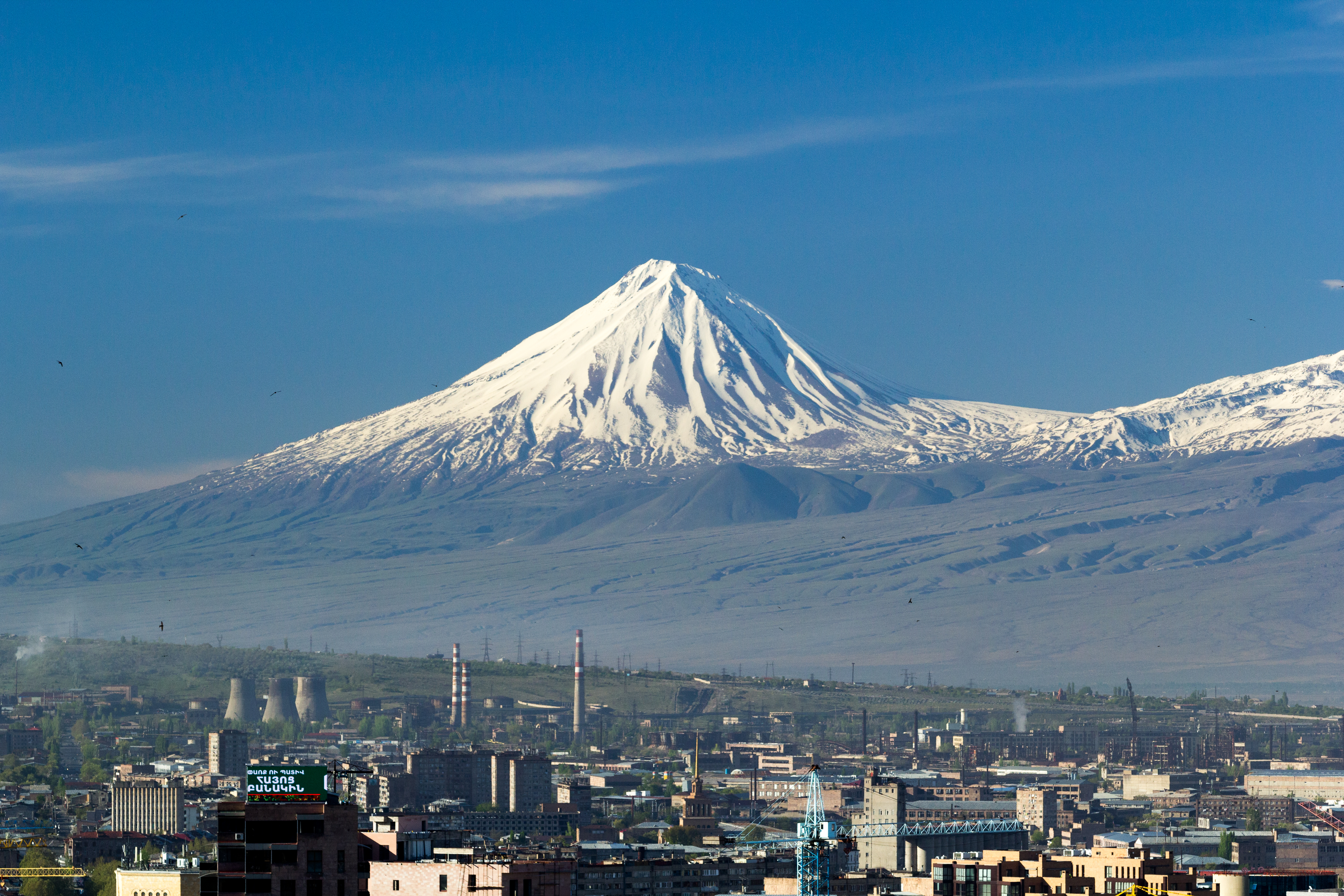
- A view of Little Ararat from Yerevan, Armenia

Highest point
- Elevation: 3,925 m (12,877 ft)
- Prominence: approx. 1,200 m (4,000 ft)
- Isolation: 8.66 km (5.38 mi)
- Coordinates: 39°39′N 44°24′E

Geography
- Location within Turkey
- Location: Doğubeyazıt District, Ağrı Province, Turkey
- Parent range: Armenian Highlands

Geology
- Mountain type: Stratovolcano

Little Ararat (Note: Also known as Lesser Ararat or Mount Sis (Armenian: Սիս, romanized: Sis).) (Turkish: Küçük Ağrı; Armenian: Փոքր Արարատ, romanized: Pok'r Ararat; Kurdish: Agiriyê Biçûk) is the sixth-tallest peak and a stratovolcano in Turkey. It is a large satellite cone located on the eastern flank of the massive Mount Ararat, less than 5 mi (8.0 km) west of Turkey’s border with Iran. Despite being dwarfed by its higher and far more famous neighbor, Little Ararat is a significant volcano in its own right, with an almost perfectly symmetrical, conical form and smooth constructional slopes. Little Ararat rises about 1,296 m (4,252 ft) above the Serdarbulak lava plateau, which forms a saddle connecting it with the main peak.

== History ==
On 8 November [O.S. 27 October] 1829, Baltic German explorer Friedrich Parrot and Armenian writer Khachatur Abovian climbed Little Ararat. Its eastern flank was on the Iranian side of the border until the early 1930s.

== See also ==
- Mountains of Ararat
