= Hesenan (tribe) =

Kurdish tribe

Hesenan (Kurdish: Hesinan) is the name of a Kurdish tribe located in various parts of Kurdistan. The largest part of this tribe lives in Turkish Kurdistan.

== History ==
They were considered part of the Milli tribe. The Hesenan are religiously Shafi'i and speak Kurmanji. The Hesenan tribe took part in the Sheikh Said rebellion in 1937.

== Notable Heseni ==
- Ferzende Beg
- Daham Miro
- Hakan Fidan
