= Ferzende =

Kurdish politician

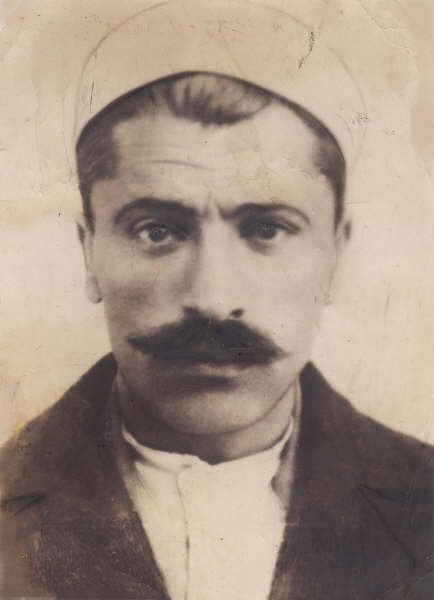
- Born: 1889; Erciş, Van Province
- Died: 1939 (aged 49–50) Qasr Prison
- Conflicts: Sheikh Said Rebellion; Ararat Rebellion; Maku Rebellion

Ferzende or Ferzende Beg (Kurdish: Ferzende Begê Hesenî, Turkish: Hasenanlı Ferzende Bey born 1889 in Erciş, Van - 1939; Qasr-e Qajar Prison, Tehran, Iran), was a Kurdish Heseni tribesman, soldier and politician.

== Life ==
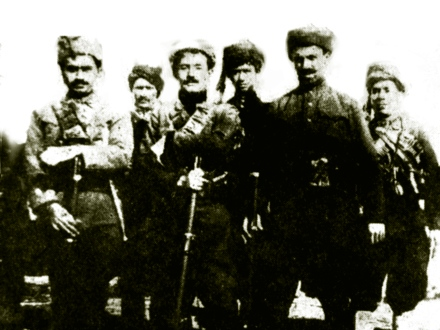
From left to right: Sipkanlı Halis Bey, Ihsan Nuri Pasha, Hasenanlı Ferzende Bey

=== Sheikh Said Rebellion ===
Ferzende was born in Erciş to mother Asiye and father Ahmed. He participated in Sheikh Said Rebellion and fought in the region of Malazgirt. After the failure of the rebellion, he went to Iran with 150 men. Persian government demanded their disarmament. But because Ferzende rejected it, the armed conflict broke out between Kurdish and Iranian forces. In this conflict Şemseddin, who is one of the sons of Halid of Hesenan, Ferzende's father Suleiman Ahmed, Kerem of Zirkan, Abdulbaki and others were killed by the Iranian forces. He was wounded during the same combat action. The survivors took shelter with local Kurdish chieftain Simko Shikak.

=== Ararat Rebellion ===
In 1927, he returned to Turkey and participated in Ararat rebellion. He got involved in most of all battles and sabotage operations. In 1930, he was wounded during the Kurdish attack on Taşburun. After the failure of the rebellion, he passed the border and went to Iran.

=== Maku Rebellion ===
In 1931, severe fighting broke out in the vicinity of Maku between the Iranian army and local rebel Kurds. The 2nd Brigade of Azerbaijan Division commanded by Colonel Mohammad Ali Khan engaged and Colonel Kalb-Ali Khan was sent from Tabriz and Ardabil with reinforcements. On 25 July, during the fighting in the vicinity of Qara Aineh, Persian Colonel Kalb Ali Khan was killed in action and Kurds lost three or four important leaders, including Ibrahim and his brother. Ferzende was wounded in this rebellion and after arrested by the Iranian security forces.

== Death ==
In 1941, Osman Sabri wrote that Ferzende had been killed by poison in the prison at Khoy two years before. According to Zarife, who is the second wife of Nadir Süphandağ (one of the sons of Kor Hussein Pascha) and lived with Ferzende's wife Besra in the same house in Tehran for four years, Ferzende died in the Qasr-e Qajar Prison before they returned to Turkey in 1939.
