= Xoybûn =

- Leader: Celadet Alî Bedirxan
- Founded: 1927 Beirut, French Lebanon
- Dissolved: 1946
- Ideology: Kurdish nationalism Secularism; Pan-Kurdism; Republicanism
- Colors: Red, Gold, White and Green (Flag of Kurdistan)

Party flag

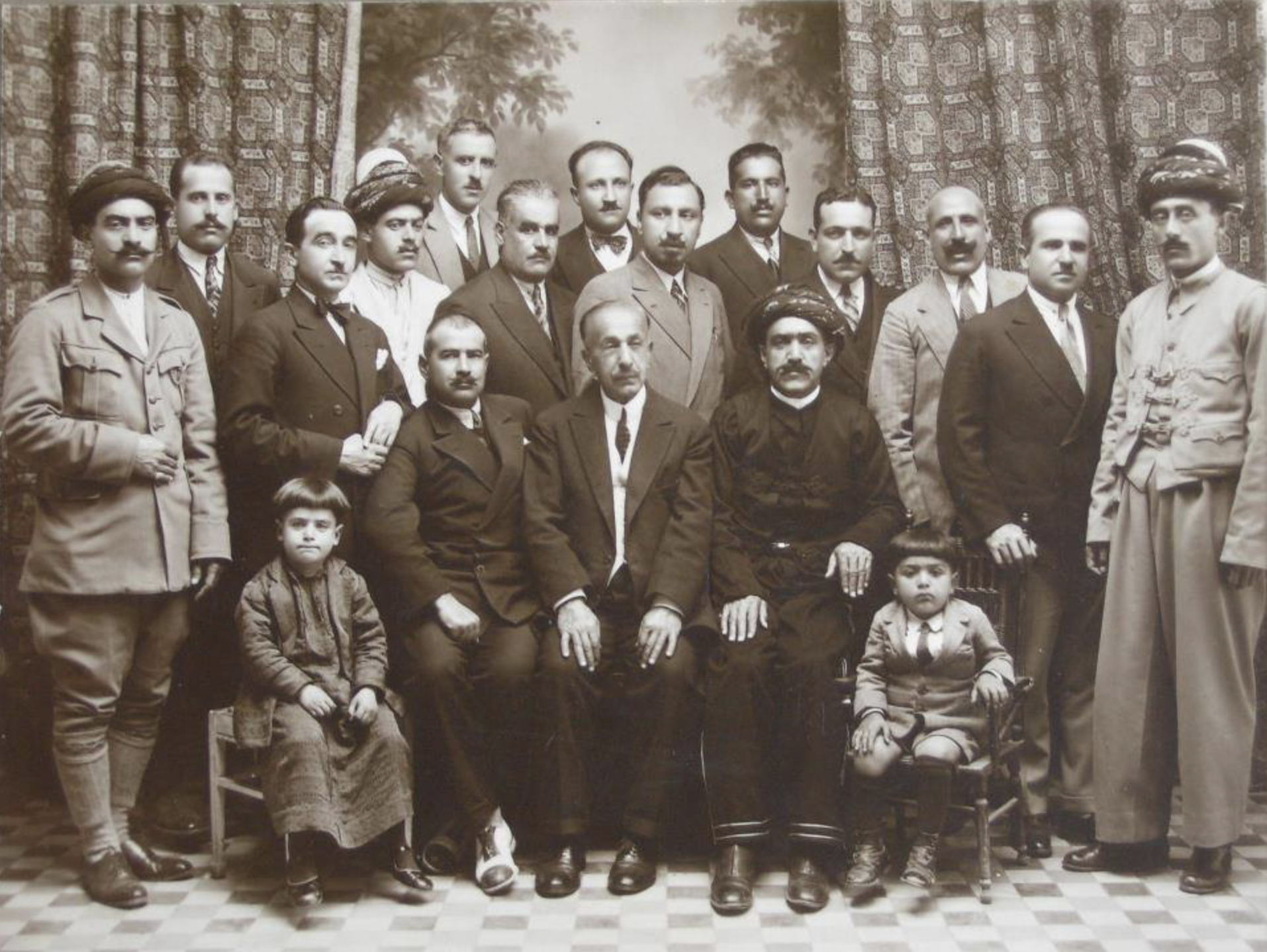
Xoybun Congress in Lebanon in 1927

Xoybûn or Khoybun (Kurdish: خۆیبوون) was a Kurdish nationalist political party, that is known for leading the Ararat rebellion, commanded by Ihsan Nuri. Many Armenians joined the movement as well, the party was active in all parts of Kurdistan until it was dissolved in 1946.

== Establishment ==
On the 5 October 1927, in Bhamdoun, Greater Lebanon, during a congress of several Kurdish notables, Xoybûn was founded by members of the Society for the Elevation of Kurdistan, Azadî (Kürdistan Teali Cemiyeti), Kürt Teşkilat-ı İçtimaiye Cemiyeti and Kürt Millet Fırkası. Prominent members of the congress were Kamuran Bedir Khan, Celadet Bedir Khan, Memduh Selim, Mehdi Saïd (the brother of Sheikh Said) and Haco Agha amongst others. In the same month the Xoybûn achieved a treaty with the Armenian Revolution Federation (ARF/Dashnaktsutyun). The treaty was negotiated in Beirut on the 29 October by Vahan Papazian for the ARF and by Celadet Bedir Khan, Mehmet Şükru Sekban, Ali Riza (the son of Sheik Said and others on the side of the Xoybun. The Xoybûn had two separate sections, an armed section and a political one. The armed wing was led by Ihsan Nuri, an Ottoman soldier. The political wing was based in Damascus, represented in several western countries and mostly by members of the Bedirxan family. The Xoybûn presented itself as a progressive but pragmatic organization, which had an independence as a goal wanted to learn from former decisions which led to the failure of the Sheikh Said rebellion.

Celadet Alî Bedirxan who was elected as its president as well as Süleymniyeli Kerim Rüstem Bey, Memduh Selim, Mehmet Şükrü Sekban, Haco Agha, Ramanlı Emin, Ali Rıza, Bozan Shaheen Bey and Mustafa bey Şahin were elected as members of the first central committee of Xoybûn. The Xoybûn can be viewed as a counterweight to the SAK led by Seyyit Abdul Kadir, who favored autonomy for the Kurds instead of independence. Turkey severely opposed the activities for Kurdish independence which amounted to the closure of Xoybuns activities in Aleppo in 1928.

== Ararat rebellion ==
Under the leadership of Celadet Alî Bedirxan, Kamuran Alî Bedirxan, Ekrem Cemilpaşa, Memdûh Selîm and others, Xoybûn decided to promote Ihsan Nuri, a former officer in the Ottoman and Turkish armies, to general (pasha) and sent him to Erzurum with 20 comrades. They published a newspaper named Agirî. The Republic of Ararat declared its independence on 8 October 1927 or 1928.

The central committee of Xoybûn appointed Ibrahim Heski, who was one of the chieftains of Jalali tribe, to the governorship of Agirî Province and Ihsan Nuri Pasha to the post of general commander of the Kurdish Armed Forces. Xoybûn also made appeals to the Great Powers and the League of Nations, but under pressure from Turkey the British Empire and France restricted the activities of those involved in the Xoybûn. Turkey accused Kurdish and Armenian rebels several times to have invaded Turkey with the aim to assassinate Mustafa Kemal. The Ararat rebellion was subsequently put down by Turkish forces in 1931.

== Sources ==
- Bakis, J. Karakoç; Karakoç, Jülide (2015). Authoritarianism in the Middle East: Before and After the Arab Uprisings. Springer. pp. 190–191. ISBN 9781137445551.
- Bein, Amit (2017). Kemalist Turkey and the Middle East. Cambridge University Press. ISBN 978-1-107-19800-5.
- Gorgas, Jordi Tejel (2007). Le mouvement kurde de Turquie en exil: continuités et discontinuités du nationalisme kurde sous le mandat français en Syrie et au Liban (1925-1946) (in French). Peter Lang. ISBN 978-3-03911-209-8.
- McDowall, David (1996). A Modern History of the Kurds. Bloomsbury Academic. ISBN 9781860641855.
- McMurray, David A. (2013). The Arab Revolts: Dispatches on Militant Democracy in the Middle East. Indiana University Press. p. 178. ISBN 9780253009685.
- Özoğlu, Hasan (2004). Kurdish notables in the Ottoman Empire. State University of New York Press.
- Schmidinger, Thomas (2017). Krieg und Revolution in Syrisch-Kurdistan: Analysen und Stimmen aus Rojava (in German). Mandelbaum Verlag. ISBN 978-3-85476-665-0.
- Tejel, Jordi (2008). Syria's Kurds: History, Politics and Society Volume 16 of Routledge Advances in Middle East and Islamic Studies. Routledge. p. 18. ISBN 9781134096435.
- Fuccaro, Nelida (1994). Aspects of the social and political history of the Yazidi enclave of Jabal Sinjar (Iraq) under the British mandate, 1919-1932. p. 233.
- Bozarslan, Hamit (2008). Faroqhi, Suraiya; Kasaba, Reşat; Kunt, I. Metin; Fleet, Kate (eds.). The Cambridge History of Turkey. Cambridge University Press. p. 340. ISBN 978-0-521-62096-3.
- Allsopp, Harriet (2014). The Kurds of Syria: Political Parties and Identity in the Middle East. London: I.B. Tauris. p. 55. ISBN 9781780765631.
