= İbrahim Tali Öngören =

Turkish politician

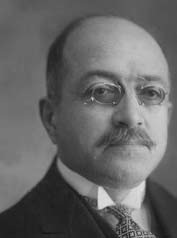
İbrahim Tali Öngören

İbrahim Tali Öngören (1875–1952) was a Turkish military officer and politician.

== Education and early life ==
He attended the medical academy of the Ottoman military and during the Turco-Italian war he was deployed to Tripolitania where he met Mustafa Kemal (Atatürk) in 1911. While preparation towards World War I were met, he was assigned the Deputy Chief of the Health Department of the Ottoman Army in 1914. He was promoted to Colonel in June 1915. As such he served in Çanakkale and Sedd el Bahr, later he stationed in the city of Diyarbakır where he met Atatürk again in 1916. He was shortly assigned as the Medical Inspector to the Ottoman Army in the Caucasus but upon his return to Istanbul, he became the Inspector for the Ottoman soldiers in treatment in the German Empire. In Germany he attended a medical congress on infectious illnesses, representing the Ottoman Empire. He became an adherent to the Kemalist ideology, was one of the military officers who supported Mustafa Kemal from the start of the Turkish War of Independence and accompanied Atatürk on his journey to Samsun in 1919. During the Turkish War of Independence he was deployed to the Eastern Front where the Kemalist forces launched an offensive against Armenia.

== Political career ==
=== Kemalist representative ===
At the Congress of the Peoples of the East of the Communist International in Baku in 1920, he represented a Kemalist delegation which attempted to raise support for their fight against the Allied forces occupying Istanbul. Talî argued the resistance against the Allied Powers was a struggle between Turkish Nationalist Movement and western capitalism. After Turkey was created in 1923, he was appointed the Turkish ambassador to Poland from June 1924 to January 1926. Later he was involved in the Turkification process of the Turkish territory, which included a large Kurdish population in the eastern provinces. In 1927, he was appointed the Inspector General of the First Inspectorate General, which span over several provinces with a Kurdish majority and was established as a reaction to the Kurdish led Sheikh Said Rebellion. As an Inspector General, he had wide-ranging authority in the eastern provinces and was able to deport and resettle people he thought would not fit in the area according to the policies outlined of the Report for Reform on the East. He divided the possessions of Kurdish tribal leaders into several smaller ones and supported the Kurdish populations Turkification through education and the Turkish Hearths. Öngören supervised the implementation of a new Five-Year plan for Security and Disarmament which was announced in April 1932. The soldiers of the Seventh Army of Turkey were involved in the plan due to expected battles. By the end of the year, Tali Öngören mentioned that thousands of weapons were confiscated in the campaign and Şükrü Kaya, the Minister of the Interior at the time, elaborated detailed reports about the weapons confiscated. In January 1933 Öngören resigned from the post as Inspector-General and was succeeded by Hilmi Ergeneli who served until 1935.

=== Öngören and the Jews ===
In 1934 he was appointed the Inspector General of the newly established Second Inspectorate General in the western provinces of Turkey. In May and June 1934, he traveled through the provinces under his domain and prepared a report concerning the population of the provinces which included a significant Jewish population at the time. He presented his report about the journey to the Ministry of the Interior, which blamed the Jews of being involved in labor unions and also exploiting the Turkish population in the region.

He organized pogroms against the Jews and stated that :

"The Jew of Thrace is of such moral corruption and such lack of character that it strikes you in the eyes. He is harmful. [...] In the Jewish conception of the world, honor and dignity have no place. [...] The Jews of Thrace are striving to make Thrace identical to Palestine. For the development of Thrace, it is of the utmost necessity not to tolerate this element [the Jews] [...] continuing to suck the blood of the Turks. [The Jews] constitute this secret danger and may perhaps, through their workers' clubs, seek to establish communist nuclei in our country; that is why it is an absolute necessity [...] to finally and in the most radical way solve the [Jewish] problem."

Due to health reasons, Öngören had to resign from the Inspectorate General in August 1935. He died on the 2 January 1952.

== Personal life ==
Ibrahim Tali Öngören was married and had three children.
