= Ihsan Nuri =

Leader of Ararat rebellion

Ihsan Nuri 1326-P. 27
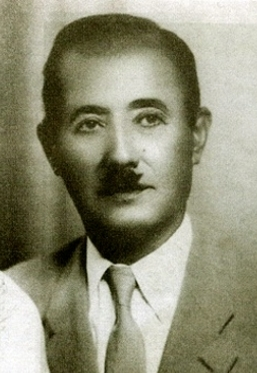
- Born: 1892; Bitlis, Ottoman Empire
- Died: 25 March 1976 (aged 83–84); Tehran, Pahlavi Iran
- Military career
- Allegiance: Ottoman Empire; Turkey; Kurdistan
- Service years: Ottoman: 1910–1919; Turkey: 1919–3-4 September 1924; Kurdistan: October 1927–September 1930
- Rank: Turkey: Captain; Kurdistan: Generalissimo
- Conflicts: First World War; Turkish War of Independence; Beytüşşebab rebellion; Ararat rebellion; Assyrian rebellion

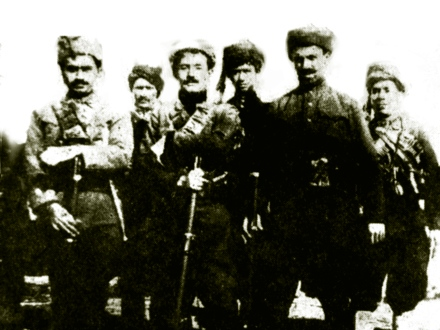
From left to right: Sipkanlı Halis Bey, Ihsan Nuri Pasha, Hasenanlı Ferzende Bey

Ihsan Nuri, also known as Ihsan Nuri Pasha (Kurdish: Îhsan Nûrî Paşa ,ئیحسان نووری پاشا), 1892 or 1893, Bitlis – 25 March 1976, Tehran) was a Kurdish soldier and politician, former officer of the Ottoman and Turkish Army, and one of the leaders of the Ararat rebellion as the generalissimo of the Kurdish National Forces.

== Early life and education ==
Ihsan Nuri was born in the house of his father Elî Qulî in Bitlis in 1893. He came from a branch of the Celalî tribe. After finishing primary education at the Gök Meydan mosque in Bitlis, he was registered in the Erzincan Military School (Erzincan Askerî Rüştiyesi). After completing secondary education, he entered in the Ottoman Military Academy. While at the academy, he joined the Hêvî, a Kurdish association of students. In 1910, he graduated from this academy as a lieutenant and joined the Ottoman Army.

== Ottoman military career ==
After he participated in the counterinsurgency operations in Albania, he was sent to Yemen and served there for 33 months. After returning from Yemen, he was appointed the aide-de-camp of Ottoman 93rd Infantry Regiment and was sent to Beyzon. In the early stage of the First World War, he was injured at Nerman and sent back to the rear area for treatment. On the way to Erzincan, he suffered from frostbite near Karaburun. After treatment in Erzincan, he was assigned to the Ottoman Ninth Army, and then appointed the member of the administration committee of Ozurgeti in Georgia, briefly occupied by the Turkish troops during the Caucasus Campaign of 1918 and served as the commander of the mobile gendarmerie of the town. After the First World War, he got in contact with the Society for the Rise of Kurdistan, who delivered him the task to establish relations amongst the Kurdish notables in area around Diarbakır, Siirt and Bitlis. He wrote an article about Woodrow Wilson's Fourteen Points, which was published on 30 March 1919 in the Jîn magazine. When he arrived at Trabzon, Rushdi Bey, who was the commander of the 9th Caucasian Division, sent him to Baku to meet authorities of the Red Army. He was a commander of the crushed Beytüşşebab rebellion in September 1924 in which he demanded other Kurdish tribal militiamen to support the uprising. He also supported the Sheikh Said rebellion in 1925 but did not take part in it in a leading position as he was in exile in Persia in February 1925. After the rebellion in Beytüssebap was subdued, the Turks intelligence undertook an attempt to portray Nuri as a Turkish spy to the British. But the British dismissed the attempt.

== Republic of Ararat ==
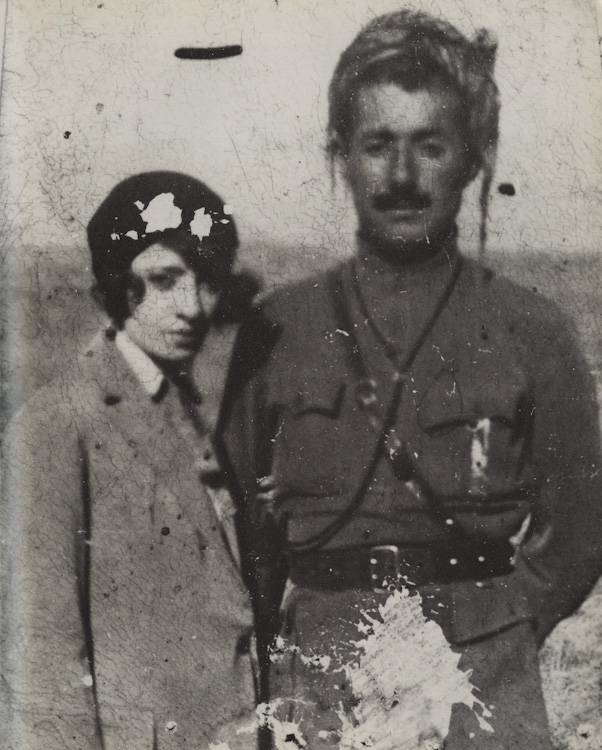
Ihsan Nuri and his wife Yashar Khanum.

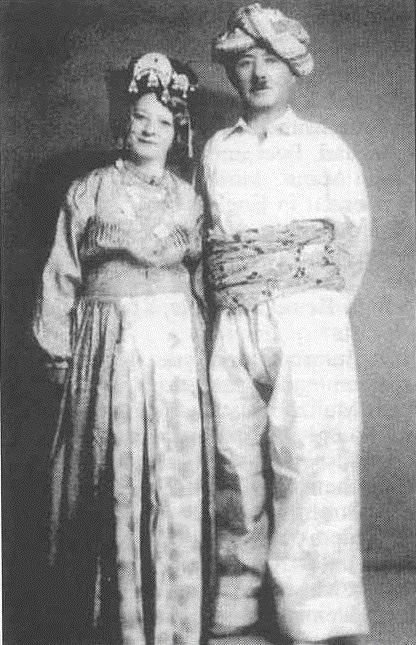
Ihsan Nuri Pasha and his wife, Khadija Yashar Khanum; both dressed in traditional Kurdish attire.

Kurdish nationalists met in October 1927 and not only proclaimed the independence of Kurdistan, but also formed Xoybûn (Independence), a “supreme national organ … with full and exclusive national and international powers”.

Cognizant of the need for a proper military structure, Xoybûn promoted Ihsan Nuri to general (pasha) and nominated him Commander-In-Chief of the Kurdish National Army. Ihsan Nuri was a former Kurdish member of the Young Turks.

By 1928, Ihsan Nuri had assembled a small group of soldiers armed with modern weapons and trained in infantry tactics. This force initiated the Xoybûn revolt, marching towards Mount Ararat. Ihsan Nuri and his men not only achieved success in reaching Mount Ararat, but they were able to secure the regions of Bitlis, Van province, and most of the countryside around Lake Van, establishing a notable area of Kurdish resistance in the region.

By the end of summer 1930, the Turkish Air Force was bombing Kurdish rebel positions around Mount Ararat from all directions. According to General Ihsan Nuri, the military superiority of the Turkish forces and the air bombardment demoralized the Kurds and led to their eventual capitulation.

== As refugee ==
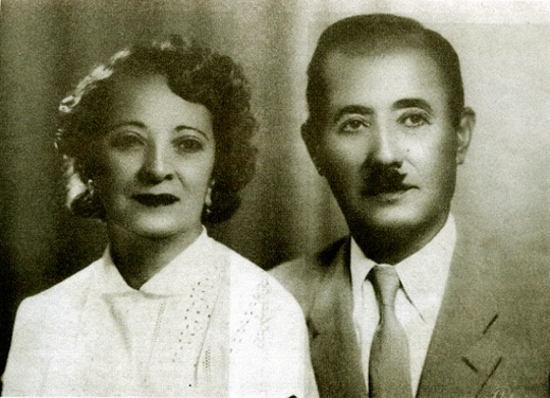
Yashar and Nuri in Tehran; both dressed in modern attire.

During the 1930s, Generalissimo İhsan Nuri arrived as a refugee in Tehran. The government restricted his movements for years in Tehran. In 1960, his situation became better and he was permitted to settle in the Kurdish region around Urmia. In 1962, he undertook a journey to West Berlin to a Kurdish language congress and, while he stayed in Berlin, he also met Kamuran Bedir Khan. While in Europe, he also visited the cities of Cologne and Vienna, and at both locations he was received by Iranian diplomats. He returned to Iran in mid 1962, where he returned to Urmia. In the summer of 1976, he was injured when he was hit by a motorcyclist directly in front of his home at around 10:00 am. He was taken to a local hospital where he died of his wounds during the day. The culprit who hit him while driving the motorcycle was never identified or apprehended.
