= Republic of Ararat =

Kurdish state (1927–1931)

Republic of Ararat Komara Agiriyê Komara Araratê
- 1927–1931
- Flag

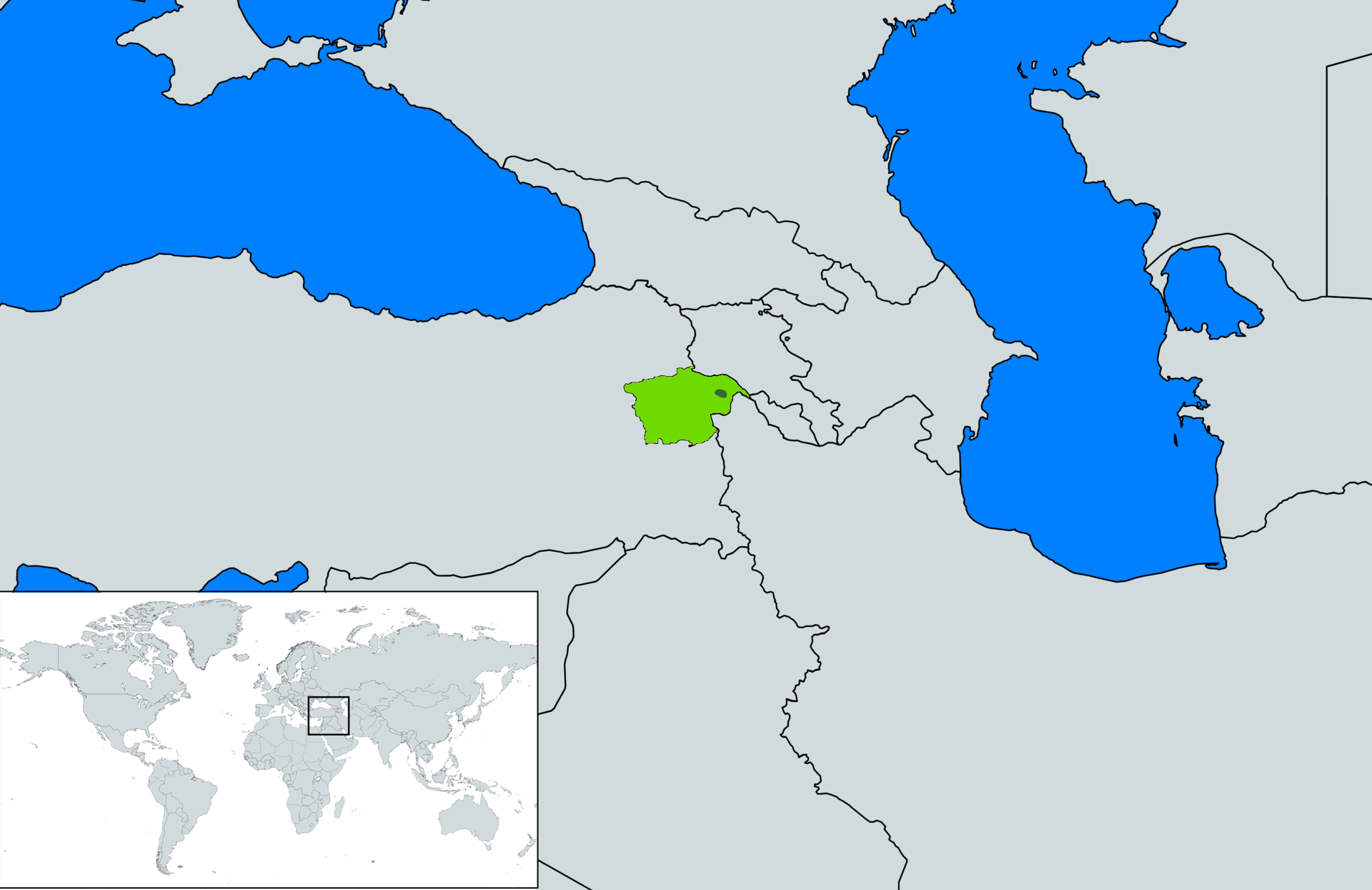
- Status: Unrecognized state
- Capital: Kurd Ava / Kurdava (Doğubayazıt); 39.35°N 43.38°E
- Common languages: Kurdish
- Government: Republic
- President
  - 1927–1930: Ibrahim Heski
- Supreme Commander
  - 1927–1931: Ihsan Nuri
- Historical era: Interwar period
  - Independence declared: 28 October 1927
  - Retaken by Turkey: September 1931
| Preceded by | Succeeded by |
| Turkey | Turkey |

The Republic of Ararat (Note: Kurdish: کۆماری ئارارات, romanized: Komara Agiriyê and Komara Araratê) was a self-proclaimed Kurdish state from 1927 to 1931. It was located in the Armenian highlands, centred on Karaköse Province. "Agirî" is the Kurdish name for Ararat.

== History ==
The Republic of Ararat, led by the central committee of Xoybûn, declared independence on 28 October 1927 or 1928, during a wave of rebellion among Kurds in southeastern Turkey. As the leader of the military was appointed Ihsan Nuri, and Ibrahim Heski was put in charge of the civilian government.

At the first meeting of Xoybûn, Ihsan Nuri Pasha was declared the military commander of the Ararat rebellion. Ibrahim Heski was made the leader of the civilian administration. In October 1927, Kurd Ava or Kurdava, a village near Mount Ararat, was designated as the provisional capital of Kurdistan. Xoybûn made appeals to the great powers and the League of Nations and also sent messages to other Kurds in Iraq and Syria to ask for co-operation. But under the pressure from Turkey, the British Empire as well as France imposed restrictions on the activities of the members of Xoybûn.

In the spring of 1930, Ferzende Beg visited Ali Can, the leader of the local Kurdish Berazi tribe, and asked him to join the Ararat uprisings. As a result, Ali Can attacked the detachment in the former Karayazı sub-district of Hasankale with his 40 cavalrymen on 7 July 1930, and a three-month long rebellion began. After further success, the districts of Tutak, Bulanık, Karaçoban, Köprüköy, Hınıs, and Karayazı were annexed to the Ararat state.

The Turkish Armed Forces subsequently defeated the Republic of Ararat in September 1931.

== See also ==
- List of Kurdish dynasties and countries
- Flag of Kurdistan
