= Jalali (tribe) =

Kurdish tribe

Jalali (Persian: جلالی, Kurdish: Celalî, Turkish: Celâlî) are a Kurdish tribe in eastern Turkey and northwestern Iran. They predominantly inhabit the Diyadin district in the Ağrı Province of Turkey and the Maku district in the West Azerbaijan Province of Iran.

== Origin ==
According to Basile Nikitine, the Jalali tribe were Kurdicized Armenians. Moritz Wagner also suggested an Armenian connection.
