= Kurdish political violence =

Politically-motivated acts of violence by Kurds

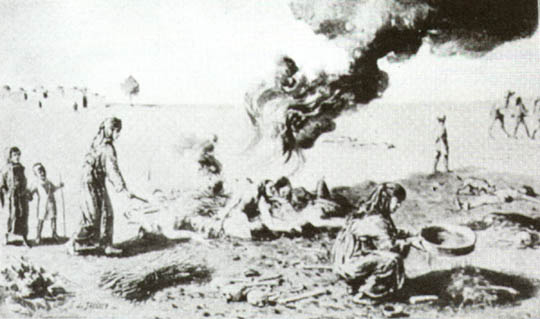
Burning Of Assyrians by Kurdish women

Kurdish political violence refers to politically motivated acts of violence committed by Kurds with the motive of achieving improved rights, self-determination, recognition, freedom of prisoners, autonomy, independence, or other goals. While Kurdish political violence mostly occurred in Turkey, Iran, Iraq, and Syria, it later spread internationally.

Kurdish groups that have been involved in politically motivated violence include the Kurdistan Workers' Party (PKK), Kurdish Hezbollah, Kurdistan Democratic Party (KDP), Patriotic Union of Kurdistan (PUK), Democratic Union Party (PYD), Kurdistan Free Life Party (PJAK), Kurdistan Freedom Party (PAK), KDPI, Komala, Khabat, Kurdistan Islamic Movement, Kurdistan Justice Group, AAIK, White Flags, and the Kurdistan Freedom Hawks. Many of these groups are designated terrorist groups in many countries.

== Previous revolts ==
The first modern politically motivated Kurdish nationalist rebellion was led by Sheikh Ubeydullah, who was unsatisfied with the division of Kurds between the Ottoman Empire and Qajar dynasty, leading him to mobilise insurgents and rebel from 1879 to 1881 for an independent Kurdish state which he himself would rule, free from any interference from Ottomans or Qajars.

In May 1919, Mahmud Barzanji led a revolt against Iraqi authorities in the newly created British Mesopotamia and later the British Mandate in Iraq. Barzanji was imprisoned and eventually exiled to India for a one-year period in 1919. When returning, he was appointed a governor, but revolted again and declared an independent Kingdom of Kurdistan. The Kingdom of Kurdistan lasted from September 1922 until July 1924 before being recaptured by the British for Iraq.

In summer 1918, Simko Shikak had established rule over Kurdish regions west of Lake Urmia. In 1919, he mobilised an army of 20,000 Kurds and managed to achieve a self-governed area in northwestern Iran, centered in the city of Urmia. His forces had been reinforced with several hundred soldiers and mercenaries, including Kurdish nationalists from the Ottoman Empire who left the Ottoman army. Kurdish insurgents led by Simko Shekak massacred thousands of Assyrian civilians. They captured many cities in a short period of time. After repetitive fails by Reza Shah to counter the Kurdish expansion, the government in Tehran attempted to reach an agreement with Simko on limited Kurdish autonomy. Simko had rapidly increased the size of his Kurdish army, which grew stronger. He continued to expand the areas of western Iran under his control. By 1922, the cities of Baneh and Sardasht were under his administration. In 1922, the Iranian Army managed to push Simko and many of his soldiers out of Iran and recapture the land.

In March 1921, the Koçgiri tribe from the present-day eastern Sivas Province started a revolt against Mustafa Kemal Atatürk. The rebellion was initially Alevi, but it succeeded in uniting nearby Kurdish Sunni tribes. The revolt leaders were close with the Society for the Rise of Kurdistan (SAK). The rebellion was defeated in June 1921.

Caused by frustration by the abolition of the caliphate and increasing Turkish nationalism, the first Kurdish rebellion in the modern Republic of Turkey was the Beytüşşebab rebellion. The revolt was led by Halid Beg Cibran of the Cibran tribe. Others who had a big role were Ihsan Nuri and Yusuf Ziya Bey. The rebellion began in August 1924, and ended in December 1924.

A revolt led by Sheikh Said erupted in 1925 with support of the Azadî against the newly founded Turkish Republic. The rebellion dominated by Zaza Kurds, but also gained support among Kurmanji Kurds.

In 1927, the Kurds led by Ihsan Nuri revolted and created the Republic of Ararat, defending it for 3 years until losing it in 1931 to Turkish forces under Mustafa Kemal Atatürk.

In 1937, a revolt led by Seyid Riza Riza erupted in Tunceli. The revolt led to the Dersim massacre. Recep Tayyip Erdoğan apologised for the massacre in November 2011.

Kurdish and Azerbaijani separatism in increased shortly after Second World War when the Soviet Union refused to give up occupied North Western Iranian territory. The Iran crisis of 1946 included a separatist revolt of KDP-I and communist groups to establish a Soviet puppet government, and declare the Republic of Mahabad. It happened alongside the Azerbaijan People's Government, another Soviet puppet state. The state itself encompassed a very small territory, including Mahabad and the adjacent cities, unable to incorporate southern Iranian Kurdistan, and unable to attract the tribes outside Mahabad itself to the nationalist cause led by Qazi Muhammad. When the Soviets withdrew from Iran in December 1946, government forces were able to enter Mahabad and recapture it.

Following a hiatus after the defeat of Mahmud Barzanji, a series of revolts led by Mullah Mustafa Barzani against Iraq eventually erupted into a full war. It lasted from 1961 until 1970. Iraq deployed 80% of its army during the war. The war ended with the Autonomy Agreement, and between 75,000 to 105,000 casualties.

In 1966, Kurdish rebels led by KDPI and smaller Marxist factions revolted against Pahlavi Iran, although the revolt was aimed at federalising Iran and achieving Kurdish autonomy. The revolt was quelled in 1968.

A second war broke out between Kurds and Iraqi forces in 1974, in which the Iraqi government finally controlled Iraqi Kurdistan after fifteen years, and, in order to prevent another revolt, started an Arabization program by moving Arabs to the vicinity of oil fields in northern Iraq, particularly the ones around Kirkuk. The Iraqi government convinced Iran to cease its support for Kurdish militants, and more failed Kurdish insurgencies broke out in 1975.

In 1983, the KDP, the PUK, and Islamist Kurds jointly revolted and captured major cities in Iraqi Kurdistan. This specific revolt led to the Anfal campaign, which led to bigger and more successful revolts.

In 1978, the PKK was formed and the Kurdistan Workers' Party insurgency began. The insurgency is ongoing, against the Republic of Turkey. The PKK began as a Marxist group aiming for Kurdish independence, although it later shifted to democratic confederalism, and, in accordance with democratic confederalism, abandoning independence and instead calling for autonomy and decentralisation.

In 1979, more Kurdish revolts broke out in Iran, although they were overshadowed by the Iran–Iraq War and did not achieve anything.

During the 1991 Iraqi uprisings, Kurds successfully regained autonomy. The autonomous region was made official in 1992. The Iraqi government recognized the autonomy of the Kurdistan Region in 2005.

== Political violence ==
On 22 October 1988, when Esat Oktay Yıldıran was on a bus with his wife and two children, he was shot dead by a gunman who screamed "Laz Kemal sends his greetings". The PKK boasted about the assassination and the killer escaped and was never caught.

Also in the 1980s, Islamist Kurds began attacking any establishment belonging to the Iraqi Ba'athist government following the declaration of war by Osman Abdulaziz. They captured significant land. Ali Bapir had also publicly executed his own brother for working with the Ba'athists.

On February 17, 1999, after the arrest of Abdullah Öcalan in Kenya by MİT with alleged help from the CIA and Mossad, a group of 55 to 200 PKK supporters armed with iron bars attempted to raid the Israeli consulate in Berlin. The protesters overpowered German police, and entered the consulate building, where Israeli security shot at them, killing 3 and injuring 14. German police arrested 30 PKK supporters and blocked off all access to the area as helicopters began circling over the consulate building. In many other European countries, PKK protestors attacked Greek, Kenyan and Turkish diplomatic missions. In Istanbul, PKK protesters torched vehicles and threw a petrol bomb at a bus belonging to Bülent Ecevit's DSP. PKK protestors seized Greek diplomatic missions in Australia, Italy, Netherlands, France, Russia, Austria, UK, US, and Canada. Hundreds of Kurds were arrested in Greece due to violent protests. They looted the National Bank of Greece in Montreal, and attacked the Turkish embassy in Ottawa, hurling rocks and ice at the building, smashing several windows, and injuring 9 Canadian policemen in the process. The US took extensive measures to protect Greek, Kenyan, and Turkish diplomats.

On January 24, 2001, the Kurdish Hezbollah ambushed and killed 6 Turkish police officers, including the chief, Gaffar Okkan, as possible revenge for the killing of Hüseyin Velioğlu.

During the 2004 Qamishli riots, which originated from a football match that escalated into a riot, a wave of violence hit northeastern Syria. Provoked by the Arab supporters of the rival team, the Kurds began attacking the Arabs, and eventually pushed Syrian authorities out of the city briefly, although they returned with tanks and helicopters and reclaimed the city. 30 people died and 160 were wounded. Mashouq al-Khaznawi became active as a result of this incident, and his torture and death was part of many events which sparked more Kurdish political violence that led to the establishment of the AANES during the Syrian civil war.

Also in 2004, the newly founded PJAK began an intermittent armed struggle against the Iranian regime, seeking self-determination through some degree of autonomy for Kurds in Iran. The clashes further intensified in 2016 before calming down.

In 2015, Rafik Yousef, a refugee in Germany who was a member of Ansar al-Islam and was arrested for two years by Saddam Hussein, attempted to kill Ayad Allawi during his visit to Germany, although ended up attacking a police officer who tried to stop him.

In late 2017, following the Iraqi recapture of Kirkuk, a group known as the White Flags began a wave of violence against civilians, politicians, Iraqi authorities, and PMF militias, and terrorised much of the disputed territories of northern Iraq for months, referring to themself as the "Kurdish resistance". The violence continued until 2018 when Iraq provided further security in the region and relations with the KRG eased. The Peshmerga claimed that they had nothing to do with the White Flags. The White Flags ambushed Iraqi soldiers and PMF militants, utilised IEDs, and used mortars and rockets. They also attacked oil wells and main roads, and committed arson on the houses of many politicians, people from certain political factions, and people who they accused of supporting the Iraqi recapture of Kirkuk.

On Newroz 2023, Kurdish nationalists who were angered by the presence of Turkish leftists and the LGBT community at Newroz festivals in Diyarbakır began attacking and beating the leftists and LGBT community and were even armed with knives and chased them out.
