= Deportations of Kurds (1916–1934) =

Deportations from Turkish Kurdistan

- Location: Turkish Kurdistan
- Date: 1916–1934
- Target: Kurds
- Attack type: Population transfer, deportation, genocide, ethnic cleansing
- Victims: hundreds of thousands deported
- Perpetrators: Ottoman Empire; Turkey

The deportations of Kurds by Turkey refers to the population transfer of hundreds of thousands of Kurds from Turkish Kurdistan that was perpetuated by the Ottoman Empire and its successor Turkey in order to Turkify the region. Most of the Kurds who were deported were forced to leave their autochthonous lands, but the deportations also included the forced sedentarization of Kurdish tribes. Turkish historian İsmail Beşikçi emphasized the influence of fascism on these policies, and Italian historian Giulio Sappeli argued: "The ideals of Kemal Atatürk meant that war against the Kurds was always seen as an historical mission aimed at affirming the superiority of being Turkish." Occurring just after the Armenian genocide, many Kurds believed that they would share the same fate as the Armenians. Historians Dominik J. Schaller and Jürgen Zimmerer state that this event "not only serves as a reminder of the unsettling fact that victims could become perpetrators, but also that perpetrators [as some Kurds were during the Armenian and Assyrian Genocides] could turn victims".

== Background and Ottoman deportations (1916) ==
During the 1910s, Kurdish-Ottoman relations were complex as some Ottoman Kurds had sided with the Committee of Union and Progress against the Christian minorities for opportunistic reasons, while others had positioned themselves against the Ottomans and sided with the Christians. Kurdish manpower had also been used in the Caucasus campaign against the Russian Empire, but the Ottomans did not consider the Kurds loyal, believing that they would cooperate with the Armenians and the Russians to further their own nationalist aspirations. On this, historian and genocide expert Ugur Ümit Üngör points at the memoirs of Commander Ahmed İzzet Pasha:

The relatively accommodating and liberal İzzet was shocked by an anecdote Mustafa Kemal Pasha (the later Atatürk) had related to him. When Kemal Pasha arrived in Hazro district to explore the region for warfare conditions, he lodged with the local Kurdish notable Hatip Bey. But the mayor of Hazro told Kemal confidentially that the local Kurdish elite was not to be trusted. He suggested that the families needed to be ‘exterminated root and branch’ as soon as possible.

Moreover, Talaat Pasha ordered in May 1916:

To preclude that the Kurdish refugees continue their tribal life and their nationality wherever they have been deported, the chieftains need to be separated from the common people by all means, and all influential personalities and leaders need to be sent separately to the provinces of Konya and Kastamonu, and to the districts of Niğde and Kayseri. The sick, the elderly, lonely and poor women and children who are unable to travel will be settled and supported in Maden town and Ergani and Behremaz counties, to be dispersed in Turkish villages and among Turks.

As the forced sedentarization and deportations began, the authorities meticulously followed up to learn how well the policies were working, requesting information on whether those deported had assimilated into Turkish culture. Moreover, the largest Kurdish city Diyarbekir was declared a 'Turkification Region' and Kurds were deported from the area, as migrants from the Balkans were planned to be settled there. Kurds deported from Diyarbekir were allowed only to return with a permission by the authorities. In 1916, about 300,000 Kurds were deported from Bitlis, Erzurum, Palu and Muş to Konya and Gaziantep during the winter and most perished in a famine.

When the liberal Freedom and Accord Party came to power in 1918 (to 1923), the few surviving deported Kurds were encouraged to return to their areas of origin.

=== Amount of deportees ===
Most sources suggest that as many as 700,000 Kurds were deported during World War I, although there are no reliable statistics. Safrastian (1948) estimates that half of these deported Kurds died. Üngör (2009) writes that "it would require a separate study to calculate meticulously how many were deported".

== Turkish deportations (1923–1934) ==
The official policy of the newly founded Turkey was to dismantle traditional Kurdish Islamic tribal society and institutions, as well as to continue with the World War I CUP's Turkist assimilationist policies against the Kurds. Consequently, the Kurds began to mobilize for a resistance and a group of Kurds led by Colonel Xalîd Begê Cibranî briefly captured the town of Beytüşşebap (see Beytüşşebab rebellion of 1924). In spite of being unsuccessful, the rebellion generated more distrust and accumulated into the Sheikh Said rebellion in 1925 which forced the mobilization of half of the Turkish army and prompted the Turks to bomb the Kurds. The rebellion was ultimately crushed and Sheikh Said executed. The far-right wing of the Young Turks exploited this situation and demanded tougher punishments and even pro-state Kurds were persecuted including politicians Aziz Feyzi Pirinççizâde and Pirinççizâde Sıdkı. By mid-1925, the government initiated a pogrom in Diyarbakir executing civilians and burning villages to the ground which in total destroyed about 206 villages and killed 15,200 people. By late 1925, the new deportation law Law on Migrants, Refugees, and Tribes Who Leave Their Local Settlements Without Permission was implemented and the Kurdish elite - numbering about 500 - were deported to western Turkey. In Sheikh Said's village, all men were deported making a 14-year-old boy the oldest man there. The subsequent laws Settlement Law from May 1926 and Law Regarding the Transportation of Certain Persons from the Eastern Regions to the Western Provinces further allowed the government to deport Kurds. In the western parts of the country, Kurds experiencing xenophobia, and in some cases, lynching.

Assuming that the laws had become successful, Turkey eased on the restrictions and allowed some of the deported to return in 1929.

Similar to the previous Sheikh Said rebellion, the Kurds of Mount Ararat rebelled in the Ararat rebellion from 1927 to 1930 and was also subdued. Consequently, the Turkish Parliament discussed new methods to oppress the Kurds. Kemalist Mustafa Naşit Uluğ argued that it was needed to "exterminate root and branch all of the remaining social institutions from the Middle Ages’ so these would ‘never blossom again". Thus, in 1934, the Settlement Law was passed which banned the Kurdish language in public and issued the settlement of Turks to the Kurdish region. On this deportation wave, Üngör writes:

The 1934 deportations distinguished themselves by more precision. Besides the transfer of entire categories of humans, the Kemalists also micromanaged the deportation of certain individuals.

During the 1940s, most of the survivors of the deported Kurds received amnesty and returned to Kurdistan.

== Independence Tribunal of Diyarbekir ==
The Independence Tribunal of Diyarbakır is a court established in March 1925 in order to quell the Sheikh Said rebellion. The court was inspired by the Independence Tribunals which were established during the Turkish War of Independence and which were provided with extensive powers to subdue the enemies of the Government of Mustafa Kemal Pasha, and established following the issuing of the Law on the Maintenance of Order by the government of prime minister İsmet İnönü on the 4 March 1925. The law was to be valid for two years, after which the Independence Tribunal of Diyarbkır was disestablished.

== Aftermath of the Dersim rebellion ==
Turkish authorities have treated present-day Tunceli area with suspicion after the rebellion and consequent massacre in the 1930s which included new conducts of deportations. Today, a majority of the people of Dersim live in Western Turkey and Europe.

== See also ==
- Deportation of Armenian intellectuals on 24 April 1915
- Hasan Hayri
- 1925 Report for Reform in the East (Turkey)

== Bibliography ==
- Bruinessen, Martin van (1994), Andreopoulos, George J. (ed.), "Genocide in Kurdistan? The suppression of the Dersim rebellion in Turkey (1937-38) and the chemical war against the Iraqi Kurds (1988)", Conceptual and Historical Dimensions of Genocide, University of Pennsylvania: 141–170
- Bruinessen, Martin van (2005), "Ismail Beşikçi: Turkish sociologist, critic of Kemalism, and kurdologist", The Journal of Kurdish Studies, V
- Olson, Robert W. (1989), The Emergence of Kurdish Nationalism and the Sheikh Said Rebellion, 1880–1925, University of Texas Press, ISBN 978-0-292-77619-7
- Pohl, J. Otto (November 2022), "Soviet Nationality Policy towards Kurds, 1917-1956", Kulturní studia / Cultural Studies, 10 (2): 78–92, doi:10.7160/KS.2022.190204, S2CID 253822197
- Sapelli, Giulio (2014), Southern Europe: Politics, Society and Economics Since 1945, Routledge, ISBN 9781317897958
- Schaller, Dominik J.; Zimmerer, Jürgen (March 2008), "Late Ottoman genocides: the dissolution of the Ottoman Empire and Young Turkish population and extermination policies—introduction", Journal of Genocide Research, 10 (1): 7–14, doi:10.1080/14623520801950820, S2CID 71515470
- Üngör, Ugur Ümit (2011), The making of modern Turkey : nation and state in Eastern Anatolia, 1913-1950 (PDF), Great Clarendon Street, Oxford: Oxford University Press, ISBN 9780199603602
