= Lütfi Müfit Özdeş =

Turkish politician

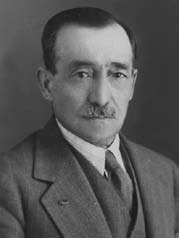
- Lütfi Müfit Özdeş
- Born: 1874; Kırşehir, Ottoman Empire
- Died: April 18, 1940 (aged 65–66); Heybeliada, Turkey
- Military career
- Allegiance: Ottoman Empire; Turkey
- Service years: Ottoman Empire: 1901–; Turkey: –1923
- Rank: Lieutenant colonel
- Commands: 2nd Battalion of the 20th Regiment, 57th Brigade
- Conflicts: Balkan Wars; First World War; War of Independence
- Other work: Member of the GNAT (Kırşehir)

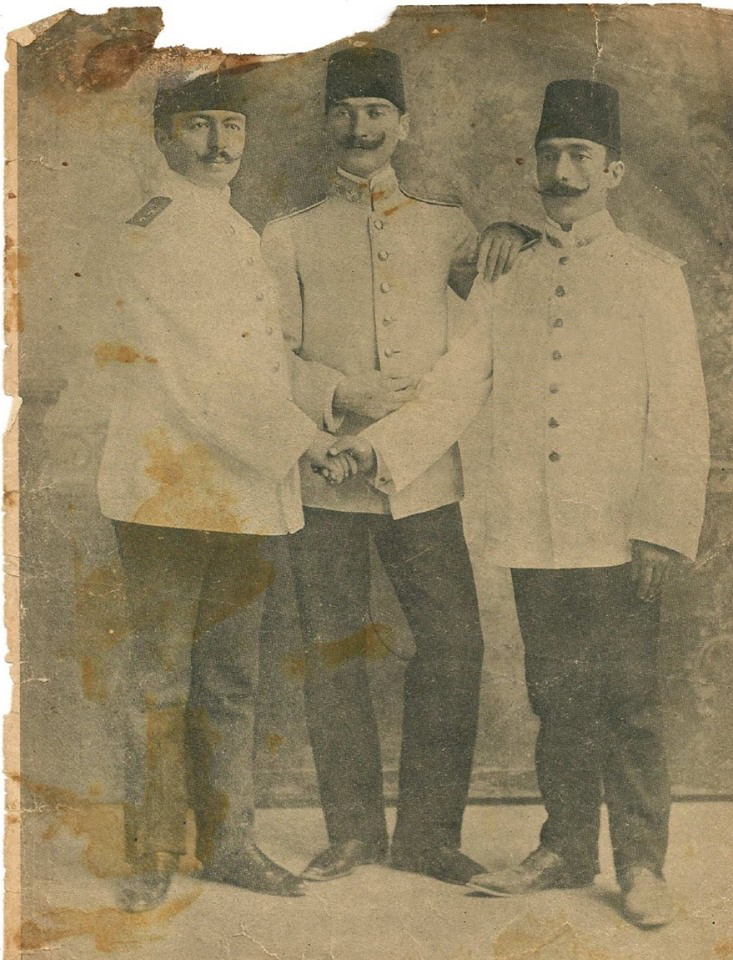
Ottoman 5th Army (HQ Damascus) officers. Left to right: Commander Lütfi, Mustafa Kemal Atatürk and Lütfi Müfit Özdeş (Beirut, 15 July 1906)

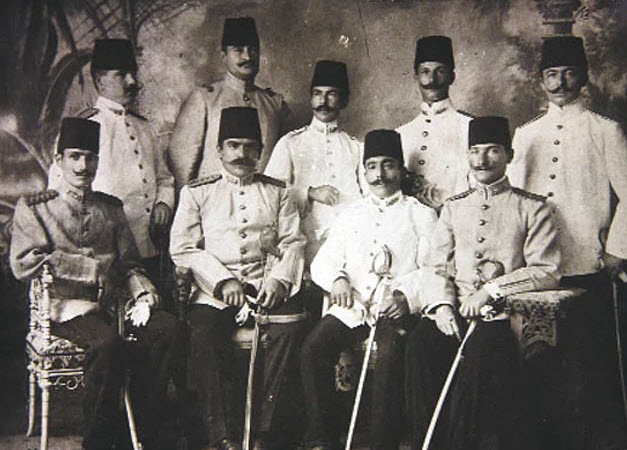
Mustafa Kemal Ataturk and Ottoman 5th Army (HQ Damascus) officers. First row the far right is Mustafa Kemal Atatürk and next to him is Lütfi Müfit Özdeş (Beirut, 15 July 1906)

Lütfi Müfit Özdeş (1874 in Kırşehir – April 18, 1940 in Heybeliada) was a military officer of the Ottoman Army, and a politician of the Republic of Turkey. He was one of the founding members of Vatan ve Hürriyet. In 1925 he was appointed a member of the Independence Tribunal in Diyarbakır, which was established the counter the Sheikh Said rebellion and sentenced Sheikh Said to death.
