= Sheikh Said =

Kurdish religious leader (1865–1925)

- Şêx Seîd
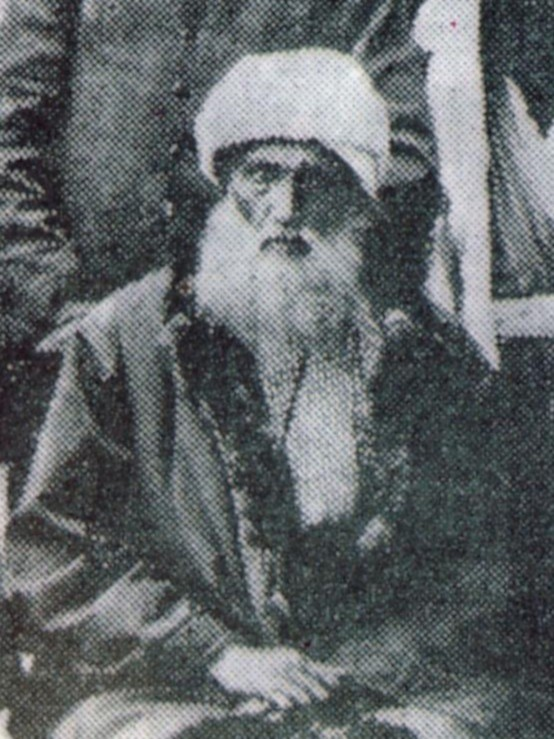
- Sheikh Said in 1925
- Born: Said Kasim c. 1865; Hınıs or Palu, Ottoman Empire
- Died: 29 June 1925 (aged 59–60); Diyarbakır, Turkey
- Cause of death: Execution by hanging
- Known for: Political revolutionary, support for sharia law and spiritual leader of the first major Kurdish rebellion since the founding of the Turkish Republic
- Parents: Sheikh Mehmud Fevzi (father); Gulê Xanim (mother)
- Rebellious leader
- Allegiance: Azadî – Society for the Rise of Kurdistan
- Branch: Azadî Battalion
- Rank: Religious leader
- Conflicts: Sheikh Said Rebellion

Sheikh Said (Zazaki: Şêx Seîd; c. 1865 – 29 June 1925) was a Zaza Kurd religious leader, one of the leading sheikhs of the Naqshbandi order and the head of the Sheikh Said rebellion.

He was born around 1865 in Hınıs or Palu, into an influential family of the Naqshbandi order, where his grandfather was an influential sheikh. Sheikh Said studied religious sciences at the madrasa led by his father Sheikh Mahmud Fevzi as well from several Islamic scholars in the region. Later he was involved in the local tekke set up by his grandfather Sheikh Ali. His grandfather was a respected leader of the religious community and his grave was visited by thousands of pilgrims. He became the head of the religious community after his father Sheikh Mahmud died. In 1907 he toured the neighboring provinces in the east and he established contacts with officers from the Hamidiye cavalry.

== Early life ==
Sheikh Said was born around 1865 in Hınıs or Palu to a Sunni Zaza family. His father was named Sheikh Mahmud Fevzi and his mother was Gulê Hanım. After receiving education at several Madrasa in Palu, Elazığ, Diyarbakır and Muş, he became the leader of the Naqshbandi order upon the death of his father. Sheikh Said spoke beside Zazaki, Kurdish, Turkish, Arabic, and Persian fluently. He settled there after his father migrated from Palu to Hınıs. During World War I, he had to move to Pîran due to the advance of the Russian Empire into the Eastern Anatolia Region, and after the war he settled to Hınıs.

Sheikh Said married Amine Hanım. Amine Hanım became ill and died when the family migrated from Hınıs to Dicle due to the Russo-Turkish War. After his first wife died, Sheikh Said married Fatma Hanım, the sister of Halid Beg Cibran, one of the leaders of the Kurdish Colonel Hamidiye Regiments. Güllü Hanım, who was also Halid Bey's sister, was married to Major Kasım Ataç who betrayed Sheikh Said after the revolt was suppressed.

Sheikh Said had ten children with Fatma Hanım, five girls and five boys. His grandson Ali Rıza Efendi, entered the Turkish Grand National Assembly as an independent deputy from Erzurum in 1973.

== Society for Kurdish Independence ==
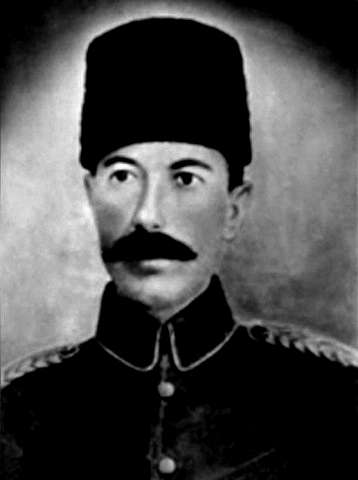
Halid Beg Cibran, the founder of the Azadî.

The Azadî, (Note: English: Freedom) officially Society for Kurdish Freedom, later Society for Kurdish Independence was a Kurdish secret organization which strived for Kurdish independency in all parts of Kurdistan. Various statements are made about the founding date of the Azadi, such as 1921, 1922 and 1923.

In 1923, Sheikh Said was approached by Yusuf Zia Bey, who wanted him to join the Kurdish secret organization Azadî. He became the leader of the Azadî after Zia Bey and Halid Beg Cibran, the leader of the Azadî, were among 21 other members reportedly tipped off by the Yörük tribe and arrested. Sheikh Said became the new leader.

During its first General Congress in 1924, in which several commanders from the Hamidye cavalry and also Sheikh Said took part, it was decided that the Kurds should revolt against the newly established secular Kemalist Turkish Republic. The Azadi was to become a leading force in the Sheikh Said Rebellion which began in February 1925 and starting from in Piran, soon spread as far as the surroundings of Diyarbakır.

== The rebellion ==
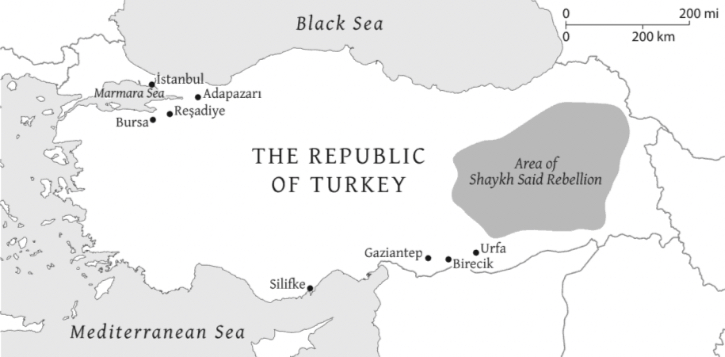
Map showing the expansion of the rebellion under Sheikh Said Pîran early 1925

Prior to Sheikh Said's rebellion, the prominent Pashas of the War of Independence worried about the anti-religious and autocratic policy of Atatürk's government and therefore on 17 November 1924, the Terakkiperver Cumhuriyet Fırkası (TCF), the first opposition party in the history of the Republic, was established. There was a general consensus that Atatürk's actions were against religion. In the TCF's article which was led by Kazım Karabekir it says that "The political party is respectful to the religious beliefs and thoughts". One of the TCF officials, Fethi Bey, said "The members of the TCF are religious. CHF is messing up with the religion, we will save the religion and protect it".

Two weeks before the Sheikh Said incident, in late January 1925, the TCF Erzurum deputy Ziyaeddin Efendi, with heavy criticism of the actions of the ruling CHF in the chair of the Grand National Assembly, said that 'innovation' had led to the encouragement of "isret" (getting drunk), an increase in prostitution, Muslim women losing their decency and, most important of all, religious customs being dishonored and disregarded by the new regime. The Azadî forces under the lead of Halid Beg Cibran were dominated by the former members of the late Ottoman era Hamidiye regiments, a Kurdish tribal militia established during the reign of Sultan Abdul Hamid II to deal with the Armenians, and sometimes even to keep the Qizilbash under control. According to various historians, the main reason the revolt took place was that various elements of the Turkish society were unhappy with the Turkish Parliament's abolition of the Ottoman Caliphate on 3 March 1924. According to British intelligence reports, the Azadî officers had 11 grievances. Apart from Kurdish cultural demands and complaints of Turkish maltreatment, this list also detailed fears of imminent mass deportations of Kurds. They also registered annoyance that the name Kurdistan did not appear on maps, at restrictions on the Kurdish language and on Kurdish education and objections to alleged Turkish economic exploitation of Kurdish areas, at the expense of Kurds. The revolt was preceded by the smaller and less successful Beytüssebap revolt in September 1924, led by Cibran and Ihsan Nuri on the orders by the prominent Azadî member Ziya Yusuf Bey. The revolt was subdued, and its leaders Cibran and Ziya Yusuf Bey were captured and courtmartialed in Bitlis.

The Azadi was to become a leading force in the Sheikh Said Rebellion which began in February 1925 and starting from in Piran, soon spread as far as the surroundings of Diyarbakır. In 1924, Yusuf Ziya was arrested. Yusuf Ziya Bey, who confessed to the organization were Sheikh Said along with Halid Beg Cibran, Hasananlı Halit and Hacı Musa. Traveling to the tribes in the eastern provinces, Sheikh Said made propaganda saying that the Republic and Mustafa Kemal Atatürk were irreligious, that Islam, marriage, chastity and honour, and the Quran would be abolished with the laws passed, and that the lords and Hodjas would be executed or exiled.

Sheikh Said appealed to all Muslims of Turkey to join in the rebellion being planned. The tribes which actually participated were mostly Kurds. Kurds of the Xormak and Herkî, two Kurdish-Qizilbash tribes were the most active and effective opponents of this rebellion. The Azadî, and several officers from the Ottoman Empire have supported the rebellion. Robert Olson states that viewing the several sources, a number of 15'000 rebels is about the average of the involved rebels in the revolt.

The men of his brother-in-law, Colonel Halit Beg, said that they would inform the League of Nations, that there were no state military forces in the region and that they could easily capture the region. He prepared a fatwa of rebellion against the Republic and the revolutions and wrote that the lives and property of those who supported the revolutions were halal. He sent the fatwa to the elders of the tribes. The Hormekî tribe in Varto announced that they would not comply with the uprising because they were pro-state. When Sheikh Said was invited to the Bitlis War Court to testify, he did not go to testify because he was old and sick, and his statement was taken in Hınıs. After wandering around Diyarbakır, Bingöl, Ergani and Genç regions for about a month, he settled in his brother's house in Dicle on February 13, 1925. The uprising started ahead of schedule due to the conflict that broke out in Piran over the gendarmerie's attempt to arrest 5 criminals.

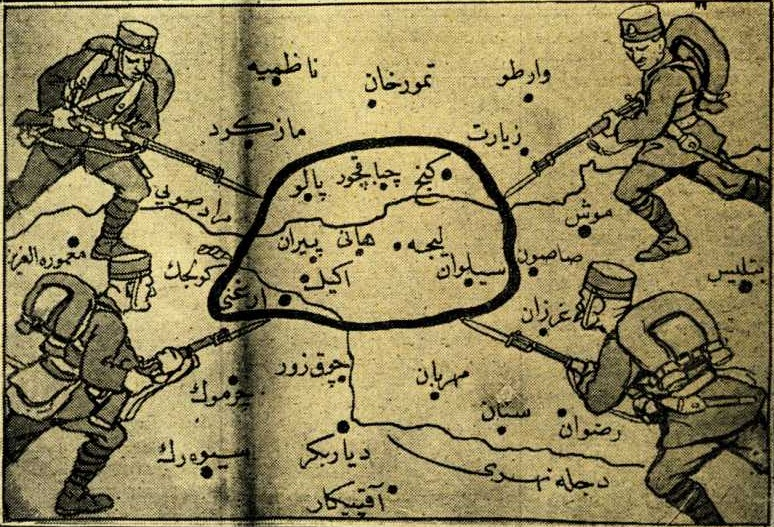
Turkish soldiers encircling Palu, Çapakçur (present-day: Bingöl), Genc (present-day: Kaleköy, Solhan), Piran, Hani, Lice, Ergani, Egil and Silvan, Cumhuriyet Newspaper, 30 March 1925.

Following the suppression of the Beytüssebap revolt, the Turks attempted to prevent an other rebellion. In February 1925, they moved into the Piran (today called Dicle) area to detain some Kurdish notables, but were prevented by from it by men loyal to Sheikh Said. The intrusion by the Turkish army provoked Kurds around Sheikh Said, and reportedly they have either killed or arrested all the Turkish officers in the areas under their control. On 13 February 1925, Sheikh Said addressed the people in his sermon in the Piran mosque and stated:

The madrasahs were closed. The Ministry of Religion and Foundations was abolished and the schools of religion were connected to the National Education. In the newspapers, a number of irreligious writers dare to insult the Prophet and extend the language of our Prophet. If I can do it today, I will start fighting myself and try to raise religion.

— Sheikh Said of Pîran

Sheikh Said was elected as the next commander of the Kurdish independence movement gathered around Azadî and Darhini was declared the capital of Kurdistan on the 14 February 1925. Sheikh Said, who had taken the governor and the other officers captive while charging against Darhini (16 February), tried to gather the movement under a single center with a declaration urging the people to rise up in the name of Islam. In this statement, he used his seal which means 'the leader of the fighters for the sake of religion' and called everyone to fight for the sake of religion. Initially, the rebellion was initiated on behalf of the Islamic Sharia, but was later converted to the Kurdish independence movement. The rebellion soon expanded and by 20 February, the town Lice, where the 5th Army corps was headquartered was captured. Sheikh Said had invited Kurdish scholar Said Nursi to join the rebellion, although Said Nursi had rejected and criticised it. Despite his tensions with Sheikh Said, he was mistaken for Sheikh Said and targeted on many occasions. Said Nursi opposed Kurdish independence and advocated for the revival of the Ottoman Empire.

After receiving the support of the tribes of Mistan, Botan and Mhallami, he headed to Diyarbakır via Genç and Çapakçur (today known as Bingöl) and captured Maden, Siverek and Ergani. Another uprising, directed by Sheikh Abdullah attempted to capture Muş coming from Hınıs. But the rebels were defeated around Murat bridge and made them to retreat. On 21 February, the government declared martial law in the eastern provinces. Army troops sent to the insurgents on 23 February were forced to retreat to Diyarbakir in the Winter Plain against the Sheikh Said forces. The next day, another uprising under the leadership of Sheikh Sharif, who entered Elazığ, kept the city under control for a short time. Elazığ was looted by rebels for several days. At the 1 of March, the Kurds managed to assault the Diyarbakır airport and destroy three of the airplanes.

In one of the bigger engagements, in the night of 6–7 March, the forces of Sheikh Said laid siege to the city of Diyarbakır with 5,000–10,000 men. In Diyarbakır the headquarters of the Seventh Army Corps was located. But neither the Kurdish notables nor the Kurdish farmers in the region in and around Diyarbakır refused to support the rebellion. The Muslim Revivalists attacked the city at all four gates simultaneously. All of their attacks were repelled by the numerically inferior Turkish garrison, with the use of machine gun fire and mortar grenades. When the rebels retreated the next morning, the area around the city was full of dead bodies. When a second wave of attacks failed, the siege was finally lifted on 11 March. After a large consignment, a mass attack (26 March), and with a suppress operation the Turkish troops made many of the enemy troops to surrender and squeezed the insurgency leaders while they were preparing to move to the Iran in Boğlan (today known as Sohlan). Sheikh Sharif and some of the tribal leaders were captured in Palu, and Sheikh Said too in Varto was seized at Carpuh Bridge with a close relative's notice (15 April 1925).

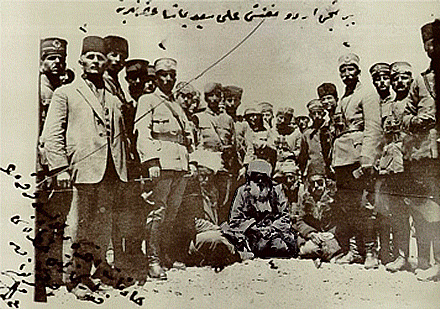
Turkish troops with the detained Sheik Said

By the end of March, most of the major battles of the Sheikh Said rebellion were over. The Turkish authorities, according to Martin van Bruinessen, crushed the rebellion with continual aerial bombardments and a massive concentration of forces. The rebels were unable to penetrate beyond Hınıs, this was one of the two major areas where Sheikh Said was well known and he enjoyed considerable influence there (he had a tekke in Hınıs). This failure excluded the possibility of extending the rebellion.

On the other hand, Hasan Hayri Efendi, who was Dersim Deputy and Alevi Zaza, entered into solidarity with Sheikh Sharif, appointed by Sheikh Said as Commander of the Elaziz Front. A joint letter with Sheikh Sharif in Elaziz was sent to all the tribal leaders of Dersim on 6 March 1925.

The Turkish army then opposed the rebellion and he was captured in mid-April 1925 after having been surrounded by the Turkish troops. He was condemned to death by the Independence Tribunal in Diyarbakır on the 28 June 1925 and hanged the next day in Diyarbakır with 47 of his followers. Sheikh Said remains were buried in an anonymous mass grave in order to prevent his memorization by the Kurds.

== Ideology ==
Sheikh Said was a member of Azadi. He was one of the most outspoken nationalists during the first Azadi congress in 1924. The Azadi organisation planned the revolt, and its leaders elected Sheikh Said as the general leader due to his charisma and religious credentials. The Kurds also preferred sheikhs over army officers, and Azadi settled on Sheikh Said. The rebellion was similar to that of Sheikh Ubeydullah in terms of religion and nationalism. Sheikh Said was among the first to link Kurdish nationalism with Islam. He believed that Islam could not be removed from Kurdishness.

Sheikh Said was provoked by both the Turkish character and secularism of the new republic. Sheikh Said claimed that since Turks abandoned Islam by establishing a secular ethnostate, they had "broke" the only tie that they had with Kurds, which was Islam, meaning the Kurds had the right "to secure their own future." While the Turkish government knew of the separatist intentions of Sheikh Said, they publicly claimed that the Sheikh Said revolt was a Turkish religious uprising aimed at reinstating the Ottoman dynasty. The Turkish state later contradicted itself during the trial of Sheikh Said, which condemned him to death as a Kurdish separatist. Historians worldwide later agreed that the Ottomanist motives were a Turkish government fabrication to hide the Kurdish elements, as part of their denial of Kurds. The judge during the trial claimed that the revolt was "heading toward one direction: the creation of an independent Kurdistan." İsmet İnönü, in his own report, described the revolt as a separatist and "fully-fledged nationalist movement". Kurdish historiographers either downplayed the religious element of the revolt, or denied its nationalist element like the Kemalists did. During his trial, Sheikh Said stated "we had a national goal and were ready to sacrifice our wealth and our lives to achieve that goal. We are not traitors. We fought to liberate Kurdistan and the Kurdish nation."

The Ottoman Empire had given Kurds autonomy in exchange for allegiance to the Sublime Porte, therefore the majority of Kurds were indeed upset when the Ottoman Empire was replaced with Turkey. However, most Shafi'i clerics did not recognise the Ottoman sultans as legitimate caliphs. In a 1924 speech in defence of the abolition of the Caliphate, Seyyid Bey, the minister of justice, stated that "from a religious point of view, the Shafi'i ulama of India, Egypt, Najd, Yemen, and that of Kurdistan, do not recognize our kings as caliphs. Do you believe the ulama in Kurdistan take the debate over the Caliphate seriously? The ulama of those regions have never recognized our kings as caliphs."

Sheikh Said himself had spoken negatively of the Ottoman Empire, stating that "under the pretext of religion and the Caliphate, the Turks and the Ottomans have for over 400 years been pushing us gradually towards slavery, darkness, ignorance and destruction." He also claimed that "we have not made the spirits of our ancestors happy. We have not fulfilled the wishes of Ahmadi Khani. That is why we live in misery and make our enemies glad." He described Turks as "migrants" who brought corruption. The Turks who lived near Kurds, who were "just as backwards and as reactionary as their Kurdish neighbors", did not join the Sheikh Said revolt. Sheikh Said stated that it was "obvious that the Turks are oppressive and vile towards the Kurds" and that Turks "do not honour their promises", and that the world must be aware of their "hypocrisy, bloodshed and barbarism." He also claimed that Turks practiced a "deceptive" form of Islam. The majority of Sheikh Said's soldiers were illiterate and monolingual Kurds, while most commanders were Hamidiye officers, such as Halid Beg Cibran, an in-law of Sheikh Said.

Sheikh Said and the other leaders of the revolt were very conscious of their Kurdish identity and had publicised their separatist motives, regardless of the heavy religious discourse. Sheikh Said's brother, Abdurrahim, and others in the revolt openly declared their aim of establishing of an independent Kurdish state. Sheikh Said did plan on restoring the Caliphate, although it would have been in his Kurdish state, and not a revival of the Ottoman Caliphate. Sheikh Said claimed that the "caliphate" would safeguard "Kurdish honor and religion", and would not extend beyond Kurdistan. Sheikh Said's closest friends who assisted him in the revolt, Hasan Serdi and Fehmi Bilal, reportedly were not Muslim.

During the revolt, Sheikh Said told his followers that killing one Turkish soldier was "better than killing seventy infidels". There were some aspects of Mahdism in the revolt.

Sheikh Said and his fighters were known for their strong belief in their ideology and their high morale, and they captured over one third of Turkish Kurdistan, including many major cities and eventually sieging Diyarbakir, with over half of the Turkish army being deployed to suppress the revolt. The Turkish army reportedly lost more soldiers during the Sheikh Said rebellion than they did during the Turkish War of Independence. Turkey initially wanted to keep all of Greater Kurdistan within its borders. However, the Sheikh Said revolt was a major turning point, as Turkey stopped its claim over the Mosul vilayet shortly after. The Turkish government were convinced that much difficulties came with ruling over Kurdish regions. Qajar state documents claimed that in order to win Kurdish support in the Mosul question, Turkey claimed that the Sheikh Said revolt was a British plot and that they only killed the rebels due to their collaboration with the British, however it was ineffective. Qajar authorities feared a possible incursion into Turkey by Iranian Kurds who were ready to support Sheikh Said.

Sheikh Said attempted to gain the support of Kurdish Alevis. Some individual Alevis, notably Hasan Hayri, joined him. However, Kurdish Alevis refused to join the revolt, claiming that they were better off in a secular Turkey than a Sunni Kurdistan. Some Alevi tribes even assisted Turkish forces during the revolt.

== Aftermath ==
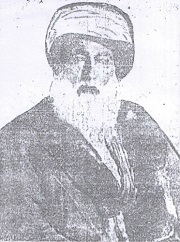
Sheikh Said of Pîran

Seyit Abdülkadir, the leader of the Kurdish Teali Society and several of his friends who were accused of supporting the rebellion, were arrested in Istanbul and taken to Diyarbakır to be tried. As a result of the trial, Seyit Abdulkadir and five of his friends were sentenced to death by the Independence Tribunal in Diyarbakır on 23 May 1925 and executed four days later. A journalist for a Kurdish newspaper in Bitlis, the poet Hizanizâde Kemal Fevzi, was also among the executed.

The Independence Tribunal in Diyarbakir also imposed a death sentence on Sheikh Said and 47 riots rulers on the 28 June 1925. Penalties were carried out the next day, by Sheikh Said coming up first. The President of the Independence Tribunal in Diyarbakır that sentenced the rebels stated on 28 June 1925:

Certain among you have taken as a pretext for revolt the abuse by the governmental administration, some others have invoked the defence of the Caliphate.

Sheikh Said, who was executed by the Eastern Independence Tribunal in Diyarbakır Dağkapı Square on June 29, 1925, asked for his last wish while on the gallows, and asked for a pen and paper, and wrote on the paper in Arabic:

"I have no fear of being hung on these worthless branches. Surely my struggle is for Allah and His religion.”

— Sheikh Said Pîran

Sheikh Said was then executed after reciting the Shahada.

In the fall of 1927, Sheikh Abdurrahman, the brother of Sheikh Said, began a series of revenge attacks on Turkish garrisons in Palu and Malatya. In August 1928 Sheikh Abdurrahman and another brother of Sheikh Said, Sheikh Mehdi, turned themselves in and made use of the amnesty law issued by the Turkish Government in May of the same year.

== Legacy ==
=== Sheikh Said Square ===
In 2014, the name of "Dağkapı Square" in Diyarbakır was changed to "Sheikh Said Square" by the Diyarbakır Metropolitan Municipality Council. The decision was taken with the votes of Democratic Regions Party and Justice and Development Party members. A segment of the public reacted to this decision, and applications were made to remove the name Sheikh Said. The attempts did not yield results.

=== Family ===
His first wife was Amine Hanim, who died during the Russian-Turkish war. His second wife was Fatma Hanim, a sister of Halit Beg Cibran, the leader of the Azadî.

His son Abdülhalik died after his deportation following the Sheikh Said rebellion. His grandson Abdülmelik Fırat became a deputy of the Grand National Assembly of Turkey. Fırat says that his ancestors were not involved in politics until his grandfather, for they had cordial relations with the Ottoman elite.

The actress Belçim Bilgin is his great-grandniece.

=== Ideology ===
One of the main flags of the Kurdish Hezbollah

At the beginning of the hardening of the Turkish-Kurdish conflict, the Kurdish Hezbollah‘s concept of ideology was identical to that of Sheikh Said during his lifetime. Thus, this party is seen as a legacy of Sheikh Said's political aspirations.

The party chairman of the Free Cause Party in Turkey, Zekeriya Yapıcıoğlu, had previously been a supporter of Kurdish Hezbollah and also stated that the cause of Hüda-Par was the continuation of that of Sheikh Said.

=== Published books ===
The catalogue of books, bibliographic and biographical treatise, the original Arabic facsimile and Turkish translation of the annotated books written by Sheikh Said in his own handwriting in Arabic about the books in his library were first prepared, translated and published by Abdulilah Fırat under the name Kütüphane Risalesi in 2021.

Sheikh Said's explanatory fatwas on some social issues, written in Arabic in his own handwriting, the original Arabic facsimile and the Turkish translation were first published in 2022 under the name Fetvalar Mecmûası, prepared and translated by Abdulilah Fırat.

== See also ==
- Kurdish-Islamic synthesis

== Sources ==
- Olson, Robert W. (March 2000). "The Kurdish Rebellions of Sheikh Said (1925), Mt. Ararat (1930), and Dersim (1937–8): Their Impact on the Development of the Turkish Air Force and on Kurdish and Turkish Nationalism". Die Welt des Islams. 40 (1): 67–94. doi:10.1163/1570060001569893.
