= Mazhar Müfit Bey =

Turkish politician

Mazhar Müfit Kansu
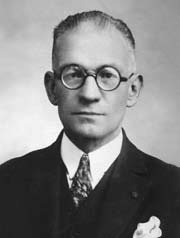
- Born: 1873; Denizli, Ottoman Empire
- Died: 1948 (aged 74–75); Istanbul, Turkey
- Occupation: Politician

Mazhar Müfit Bey (1873, Denizli – 1948, Istanbul) was a Turkish civil servant and politician. In 1934 he assumed the surname Kansu.

== Biography ==
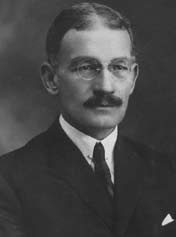
Mazhar Müfit Bey in the 1920s

He was born in Denizli, Ottoman Empire. After serving as a mathematics and history teacher in Edirne and Gelibolu, he chose civil service. In 1897, he was appointed as a governor of various kazas such as Havsa, Çorlu, Uzunköprü and Xanthi (now in Greece). In 1908, he was promoted and appointed as the governor of several sanjaks such as Mersin, İzmit and Balıkesir. (Both sanjaks and kazas were administrative units where sanjaks were bigger than kazas.)

In 1918 he was appointed as the governor of Bitlis Province which was recently recaptured from Russian Empire. In 1919, he joined Turkish nationalists in the Turkish War of Independence. He was a member of the Committee of Representation formed as the executive branch of the Congress of Sivas. Nationalists supported the General Assembly of the Ottoman Empire, and he attended the Ottoman Parliament as the representative of Hakkari. After the Ottoman Parliament was closed by the Allies of World War I on 18 March 1920, he returned to Ankara, the capital of the nationalists (via Beirut and Silifke).

In Ankara, he was appointed governor of Elazığ Province. After the Republic was proclaimed on 29 October 1923, he served as a member and chief of various Independence Tribunals, also in the one established in Diyarbakır in order to counter the Sheikh Said rebellion. In later years, he became an MP of the provinces Denizli and Artvin (then known as Çorlu) up to 1946.

Mazhar Müfit Kansu, being a close friend of the founder of the Republic Mustafa Kemal Atatürk (1881–1938), published his memoirs about Atatürk in a newspaper shortly before his death in 1948. In 1966, these notes were published as a book titled Erzurum'dan Ölümüne Kadar Atatürk'le Beraber ("Together With Atatürk; From Erzurum Until His Death")
