= Fatherland and Freedom =

The phrase "fatherland and freedom" or "fatherland and liberty" may refer to

- Basque Country and Freedom, a Basque separatist group better known as ETA
- For Fatherland and Freedom/LNNK, a Latvian political party
- Fatherland and Liberty ("Patria y Libertad"), an extreme right political movement in Chile
- Fatherland and Liberty, a play written by José Martí
- Vatan ve Hürriyet (meaning "Motherland and Liberty" in Turkish) a secret society under Ottoman Empire.
