= Müfit =

Müfit is a Turkish given name for males. People named Müfit include:

- Müfit Erkasap, Turkish football coach
- Ali Müfit Gürtuna (born 1952), Turkish politician
- Mazhar Müfit Kansu (1873–1948), Turkish civil servant and politician
