= Bağlar, Şemdinli =

Village in Hakkari Province, Turkey

Bağlar
- Village
- Location within Turkey
- Coordinates: 37.291°N 44.523°E
- Country: Turkey
- Province: Hakkâri
- District: Şemdinli
- Population (2023): 786
- Time zone: UTC+3 (TRT)

Bağlar (Kurdish: Nehrî) is a village in the Şemdinli District in Hakkâri Province in Turkey. The village is populated by Kurds of the Humaru and Zerzan Kurdish tribes and had a population of 786 in 2023.

Bağlar has the nine hamlets of Çamlıca (Bêşems), Güzelkaya (Bêgirdê), Meşeli (Bêmlate), Turi (Tûyê), Moşe (Beyteran), Çem (Nawrezan), Rüzgarlı (Rubunus), Tuva and Zorgeçit (Kerketî) attached to it.

== History ==
Nehrî was a sub-provincial centre and a small emirate in the 19th century ruled by the seyyids of Nehrî. The seyyids of Nehrî were an influential Kurdish Sufi family of the Naqshbandi order whose leader Sheikh Sayyid Taha I gained influence after the defeat of Bedir Khan Beg in 1847, by inciting violence against local Assyrians. The son of Sheikh Taha, Sheikh Ubeydullah, was one of the most influential Kurdish leaders in the early 20th century by inciting the first nationalist Kurdish uprising against the Ottoman Empire. Today, the village is populated by an unrelated Kurdish family as the land was confiscated by the central government after the uprising.

== Population ==
Population history from 1997 to 2023:

Population
Year	Pop.	±%
1997	520	—
2007	788	+51.5%
2010	798	+1.3%
2015	1,093	+37.0%
2020	914	−16.4%
2023	786	−14.0%
