= Independence Tribunal of Diyarbekir =

Court in Turkey

The Independence Tribunal of Diyarbakır is a court established in March 1925 in order to quell the Sheikh Said rebellion. The court was inspired by the Independence Tribunals, which had been established during the Turkish War of Independence, provided with extensive powers to subdue the enemies of the Government of Mustafa Kemal, and established following the issuing of the Law on the Maintenance of Order by the government of Prime Minister İsmet İnönü on the 4 March 1925. The law was to be valid for two years, after which the Independence Tribunal of Diyarbakır was disestablished.

== History ==
At first, the courts members were Mazhar Müfit (Kansu) as its president, Ali Saip (Ursavaş) and Lütfi Müfit (Özdeş) as members of the tribunal, then prosecutor Süreyya Örgeevren and Avni Doğan as the courts assistant. All of them had taken part in the Young Turks movement. After eight months, Hacim Muhittin Çarıklı succeeded Kansu as its president. The last president was Ali Saip, and Ibrahim Kocaeli was seated as a member of the tribunal.

The tribunal first took aim at the Kurdish elite residing in Istanbul, notably former members of the Society for the Rise of Kurdistan (SAK), and sentenced them to death. The former leaders of the society, Sayyid Abdulkadir and his son Sayyid Mehmed (both descendants of Sheikh Ubeydullah), Fuad Berxo, and the journalist Hizanizâde Kemal Fevzi were hanged on the 27 May 1925 in sight of the Ulu Cami of Diyarbakır. Following, many of the Kurdish elite in the eastern provinces were prosecuted and hanged. Sheikh Said was arrested in April 1925 and following sent to the Diyarbakir prison. On 28 June 1925, Sheikh Said was tried and given the death sentence, together with 46 of his followers. The next day, they were hanged at the Mountain Gate of Diyarbakir.

In total, the Independence Tribunal in Diyarbakır prosecuted more than 5000, found over 2700 as not guilty and sentenced 420 to death. The rulings of the Independence Tribunal were final and could not be appealed.
