= Azadî =

Kurdish secret organization

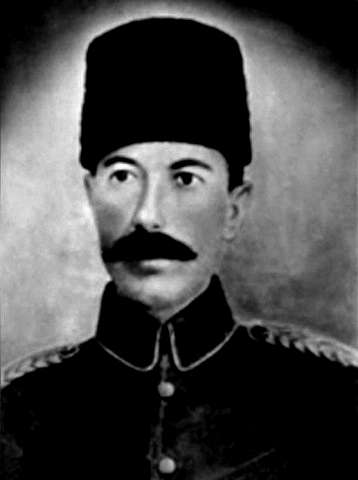
The founder of Azadî, Halid Beg Cibran

The Azadî (lit. 'Freedom'), officially Civata Azadiya Kurd (Society for Kurdish Freedom), later Civata Xweseriya Kurd (Kurdish: Society for Kurdish Independence) was a Kurdish secret organization. According to Kurds who reported to British intelligence officers, Azadî was established in Erzurum in 1921 by Halid Beg Cibran. The aim of Azadî was to deliver the Kurds a life in freedom in a developed environment.

== History ==
Several reasons were put forward for its establishment, such as:

- That only the Turkish language was allowed in the courts, which could lead to misunderstandings
- That only Turkish was taught at the schools, and the religious schools were closed, therefore no education was available for the Kurds
- Taxes had to be paid several times a year, and no benefit was perceived from the taxes
- The Turks also settled Turkish refugees in the areas of Kurdish majority, attempting to achieve a Turkish majority.
- Then also the omitting of Kurdistan from all maps and the gradual renaming of geographical places from Kurdish into Turkish
- Then also they opposed the fact that the members of parliament were appointed by the central government and not elected by the people.
- The attempts of the Turkish Government to exploit the mineral reserves in the Kurdish provinces
- That there were no Kurdish Governors employed
- The lack of respect to the Kurdish officers and soldiers within the Turkish Army
- The Military raids which were conducted in villages inhabited by Kurds

According to Robert Olson, Azadî has established sections in the cities of Erzurum, Dersim, Diyarbakir, Siirt, Istanbul, Bitlis, Kars, Hınıs, Erzincan, Muş, Van, Malazgirt, and Harput and several Kurdish notables and tribe leaders were the heads of the sections. According to Robert Olson, the British intelligence reported that by 1924 Seyyit Abdulkadir was the registered as the head of office in Istanbul. At its beginning there were mainly Kurdish notables and former officers of the Hamidye cavalry amongst its members. It appointed several of its members to establish ties with diplomats from the British Empire, attempting to secure their support. They also attempted to gain the support of the former Sultan Mehmed VI. During its first General Congress in 1924, in which several commanders from the Hamidye cavalry and also Sheikh Said took part, it was decided that the Kurds should revolt against the newly established secular Kemalist Turkish Republic.

The Azadî was a leading force involved the Beytüşşebab mutiny in September 1924 and also in the organization of the Sheikh Said rebellion in 1925. After many members from the Azadî were arrested following the failed revolt in Beytüşşebab, the movement has chosen Sheikh Said as its leader. The rebellion failed, following which the Kurds assembled around the Xoybûn, who was involved in the Ararat rebellion from 1927–1930.
