= Mustafa Cantekin =

Turkish politician

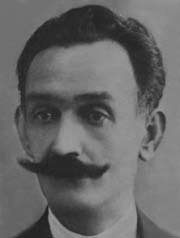
- Born: 1878; Çorum, Ottoman Empire
- Died: 21 October 1955 (aged 76–77); Ankara, Turkey
- Military career
- Allegiance: Ottoman Empire (1909–1920); Turkey (1920–1928)
- Service years: 1909–1928
- Commands: Head doctor of the field hospital of the V Corps; Head doctor of the Afyon Military Hospital
- Conflicts: Balkan Wars; World War I Turkish War of Independence
- Other work: Member of the TBMM (Kozan); Member of the TBMM (Çorum)

Mustafa Elvan Cantekin (1878 – 21 October 1955) was a military physician of the Ottoman Army and a politician in the Republic of Turkey. He was one of the founding members of Vatan ve Hürriyet secret society, which was just one of the several organizations opposed to the regime of the Ottoman sultan Abdul Hamid II.
