= Abdulkadir Ubeydullah =

Kurdish politician

- Abdulkadir Ubeydullah around 1910
- Born: 1851; Şemdinli, Van Eyalet, Ottoman Empire
- Died: 27 May 1925 (aged 73–74); Bitlis, Turkey
- Cause of death: Execution by hanging
- Known for: President of the Kurdish Society for Cooperation and Progress (KTTC) and later the Society for the Rise of Kurdistan
- Parent: Sheikh Ubeydullah (Father)
- Kurdish leader
- Allegiance: Azadî - Society for the Rise of Kurdistan
- Conflicts: Uprising of Sheikh Ubeydullah; Kurdish rebellions during World War I; Sheikh Said Rebellion

Abdulkadir Ubeydullah (1851 - 27 May 1925) was a President of the Kurdish Society for Cooperation and Progress (KTTC) and later the Society for the Rise of Kurdistan. He was a leading Kurdish intellectual and a once also a member of the Senate of the Ottoman Empire. He also took part in the uprising of Sheikh Ubeydullah led by his father and was accused of having taken part in the Sheikh Said rebellion.

== Early life ==
The son of the notable Kurdish leader Sheikh Ubeydullah and grandson of Sheikh Taha. He was educated in the Naqshbandi tradition and his family claimed descent from Abdul Qadir Gilani. He was fluent in Kurdish, Turkish, Persian, Arabic and French. During the uprising of Sheik Ubeydullah, he was the commander of a contingent of Kurdish forces, which from October 1880 onwards on, captured several towns from the shores of Lake Urmia to the outskirts of Tabriz.

He was exiled in 1881 after his father's unsuccessful rebellion against the Ottoman state. For some time there is little known about Abdulkadir, but in 1895 he is mentioned a member of the Committee for Union and Progress (CUP) in Constantinople. But then he was implicated in a plot to overthrow Sultan Abdul Hamid II, following which he was sent into exile to Mecca in 1896. From Mecca he traveled on the Beirut, but stayed in contact with politicians of the CUP. Enver Pasha asked for his collaboration in compelling the Kurdish tribes into acknowledging CUPs authority after the revolution of the Young Turks in 1908. It was a demand to which he agreed to.

=== Return to the Ottoman capital ===
He was a member of the Senate of the Ottoman Empire from 1910 to 1920 and then briefly President of the Ottoman Council of State. With the membership in the parliament his career in the Ottoman bureaucracy began, and after the World War I he presided over the sub-committee in the parliament.

== Kurdish activities ==
Following his returned from exile to Constantinople in 1908, he became one of the founders of the KTTC and later the SAK. In 1918, Abdulkadir became president of the SAK even though Emin Ali Bedir Khan from the influential Kurdish Bedir Khan family opposed him. As such, he lobbied for an autonomous Kurdish region before the diplomats of France, Great Britain and the USA in Constantinople. The Peace Conference in Paris was discussed in the conversations. But he opposed that foreign powers were engaged in the creation of a future state in the aftermath of the defeat of the Ottoman Empire.

At a meeting on December 8, 1919, in Istanbul with Thomas Beaumont Hohler, Secretary of State to the British High Commissioner John de Robeck, Abdulkadir explained that the Kurds and Armenians had reached an agreement both in Istanbul and in Paris. He explained that Damat Ferid Pasha was requesting help to overthrow the government of Grand Vizier Ali Rıza Pasha, and that he had then promised the Kurds autonomy and a number of other things. He further stated that it was impossible to estimate what Mustafa Kemal, together with the Azerbaijanis, who were being instigated by Enver Pasha and Halil Kut, could achieve, and that Mustafa Kemal was becoming a greater danger every day. When Hohler asked whether the Hürriyet ve İtilaf Fırkası would use force against Mustafa Kemal, he replied in the affirmative. Tom Beaumont Hohler was very impressed by Abdulkadir's determination to establish his own independent state of Kurdistan.

In an interview given to the newspaper Ikdam in February 1920 Abdulkadir declared he was an adherent of an autonomous Kurdish region with a leadership elected by Kurds. He was also supportive of the achievements of Şerif Pasha (who supported an autonomous Kurdistan) at the Peace Conference in Paris. Nevertheless, the Grand vizier Damat Ferid Pasha suspected Abdul-Kadir was organizing Kurdish tribal leaders in Anatolia in preparation for independence. As his objection against a Kurdish independence was made public, the dispute between two leaders of the SAK, namely Abdulkadir and Emin Ali Bedir Khan who favored independence emerged and the SAK was dissolved. According to Robert Olson, the British intelligence reported that by 1924 Ubeydullah was the registered as the head of the Azadî office in Constantinople. He wielded great influence over the Kurdish population of Constantinople, and was described as an indispensable figure in Kurdish politics.

== Death ==
Abdulkadir and his son Mehmed were charged with being involved in the Sheikh Said Rebellion and were tried by the Independence Tribunal in Diyarbakir. Both were sentenced to death on 23 May 1925 and were hanged two days later. While walking towards the gallows, his son Mehmed was heard warning his executioners that their government's actions would open a Pandora's box and bring calamity upon themselves. After their execution another of Abdulkadir's sons, Abdullah rebelled against the government in revenge and according to British sources was temporarily successful.

== See also ==
- Azadî
