= Hasan Hayri =

Turkish politician (1881–1925)

Hasan Hayri or Hasan Hayri Kanko (Kurdish: Hesen Xeyrî Beg) (b. 1881 (1497), Akpınar, Hozat, Tunceli - 1925), was a Kurdish politician from Dersim.

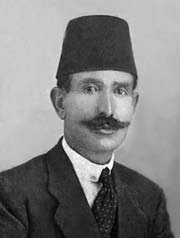
Hasan Hayri

== Early life ==
Hasanli was the son of Beyzade Murtaza Agha. After completing primary and secondary education in Dersim, he was taken to the Tribal Class of the Ottoman Military Academy on 3 October 1896. He was appointed to the 4th Army Siverek Tribal Cavalry Regiment, graduating with the rank of Lieutenant Cavalry on 24 February 1898.

== Career ==
While he was in charge of the Van Military Service Branch, he became a deputy of Dersim at the election held for the last period of the Meclis-i Mebusan. In 1920, he served as a deputy of Dersim in the first period of the Turkish Grand National Assembly:

He worked in the Parliament on Health and Social Aid, Petition, Economics, and National Defense Commissions.

In the Sheikh Said Rebellion, Hasan Hayri was arrested and sentenced to death at the Eastern Independence Court, arguing that he participated in actions to help the insurgents.

== Personal life ==
He was married and had four children. His family received the surname "Kanko" (some sources say Kano).
