= LGBTQ rights in Kurdistan =

Lesbian, gay, bisexual, transgender, and queer (LGBTQ) people in Kurdistan face legal and social challenges not experienced by non-LGBTQ residents.

== LGBTQ rights in Turkish Kurdistan ==
Since their founding, the HDP has announced its support for all ethnic, religious, and sexual minorities. In their election manifesto of 2015, they strongly condemned discrimination against LGBTI people. Out of all the 80 people from the HDP executive committee elected in 2015, three of their representatives were LGBTI.

However, not all pro-Kurdish parties support the LGBTI, as seen in the Newroz clashes. The Kurdish nationalist and Islamist party known as HüdaPar, and the militant group loyal to them known as Kurdish Hezbollah, have always been known to be a danger to the LGBTI community and to anyone they accuse of supporting the LGBTI community.

=== 2023 Newroz clashes ===
Newroz clashes
Date	March 21, 2023
Location	Diyarbakır, Turkey
Result	Crowds dispersed

Belligerents
Kurdish nationalists Neo-Nazis; KDP supporters HAKPAR supporters Amedspor hooligans	PKK supporters HDP supporters TİP supporters LGBT community İHD

The LGBT community had previously been attacked in Newroz celebrations by Kurdish nationalists in 2022. The attacks were initiated on Newroz 2023 by a Kurdish Neo-Nazi group known as "Kurdên Nasyonalist", who published a statement before Newroz calling for all Kurdish nationalists to specifically attack Turkish leftists and the LGBT community and its supporters, who were known to come to Newroz celebrations to show solidarity with Kurdish leftists. The Kurdish nationalists specifically threatened the "Turkish Kemalist left", claiming that they infested the Newroz celebrations like "parasites", and said that "if a single Kurd's nail is bent, all of the nationalists will land on your head." They also said that anyone who loves Mustafa Kemal Atatürk will be attacked if they come to the celebrations.

During Newroz in Diyarbakır, a group of Kurdish nationalists approached a group of people who carried LGBT signs and flags, and physically attacked them. A member of the nationalists emphasised that the leftist Turks will be attacked too, telling his group that "if you see flags of the TİP and LGBT, which have nothing to do with Newroz or Kurdishness, you can use them to ignite the fire of Newroz." The nationalists attacked members of the Human Rights Association (İHD) and the TİP when they tried to calm the brawls down. The Turkish leftists and LGBT supporters were brutally beaten, and many of them filed criminal complaints against the Kurdish nationalists. Before the attacks, the Kurdish nationalists followed the Turkish leftists and harassed them. Among the Kurdish nationalists, there were many Barzani and KDP supporters, who had actually planned to shoot the LGBT sympathisers and Turkish leftists, after which they instantly fled. PKK supporters were present, chanting "long live Apo" before also being chased and attacked by the nationalists. Many of the nationalists were armed with knives. At a separate celebration also in Diyarbakir, Amedspor hooligans and HAKPAR supporters attacked more Turkish leftists and LGBT supporters. After Newroz, the nationalists boasted about the attacks and posted provocative statements, while the LGBT community vowed that they would continue appearing at Newroz celebrations. The TİP called on its supporters to not generalise all Kurds because of the attacks, and stated that they will continue supporting Kurds and were not intimidated by the Kurdish nationalists.

== LGBTQ rights in Iraqi Kurdistan ==
The situation of the LGBTQ community in the Kurdistan Region was sometimes discussed in April 2021, when it was announced that the Kurdish security forces had arrested several homosexuals in Sulaymaniyah. The government denied targeting the group and said its operation was more to crack down on prostitution. Members of the LGBTQ community report widespread discrimination across the Middle East. During its reign of terror in Iraq and Syria, the Islamic State terrorist group released videos in which its members killed gay men by throwing them from rooftops. Experts say a legal loophole is still at the heart of the LGBTQ community's problem. Iraqi human rights lawyer Asrin Jamal said: "Neither the Iraqi law nor the changes of the Kurdistan Region have provided any definition for the LGBTQ community."

== LGBTQ people in Kurdish culture and art ==
Gender has never created an important issue in Kurdish culture, art and politics. Even though the Kurdish society is still very conservative in this regard, in recent times there has been an increase in the number of artists who stand on their sexual orientation without hiding it. Even: it is part of their image as artists and they are generally accepted as such. Among the pioneers of the last 50 years, the former PKK fighter Rotinda, although he never made a statement about his sexual orientation, wrote many Kurdish songs and had a positive impact on millions of Kurds around the world. The musical and literary projects for children that several generations have grown up with should not be forgotten (for example: The Gulên Mezrabotan group project is one of the most famous and effective Kurdish groups for children in educating children).

Since then, there have been some artists and their sexual orientation is part of their image: they want to shake people up and therefore provoke some conservative circles with their pride. For example, when Semyanî Perîzade released his first song "Alo", there was a real hype about it. Endless discussions were held, on topics such as "What is the legitimacy of a Kurdish woman, how should she be and what should she wear". When Semyanî herself spoke and announced that she is bisexual, this caused a gender discussion in Kurdish music and art. Today, she is generally accepted and taken seriously as a contemporary artist who has broken taboos.

== LGBTQ people in the Kurdish militas fighting against the Islamic State ==
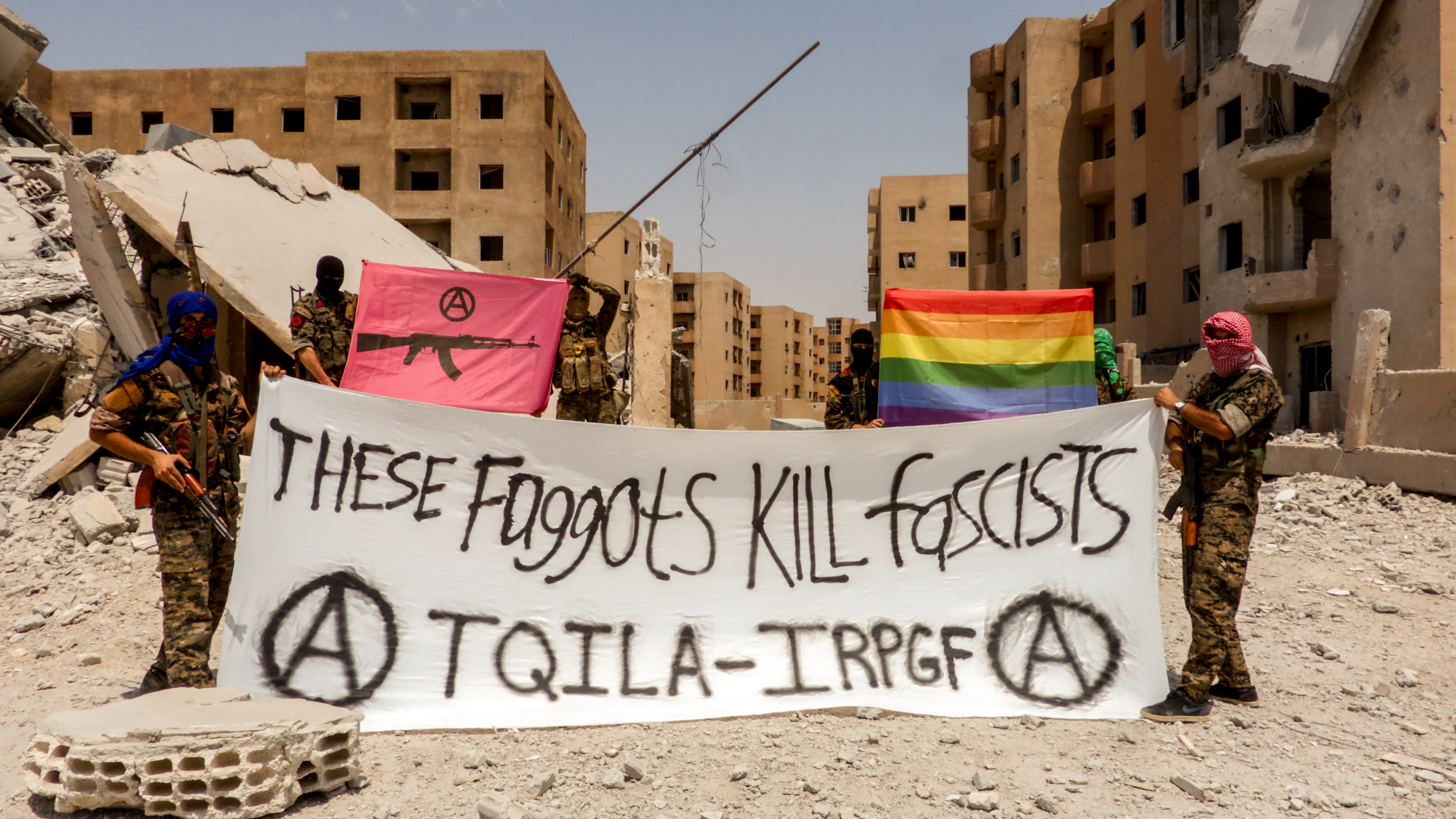
"These Faggots Kill Fascists! The Queer Insurrection and Liberation Army (TQILA), a subgroup of the IRPGF, in Raqqa."

Gender, ethnicity, religion and sexual orientation have never created any issue in the Kurdish fight for cultural and political rights. Instead, many Kurdish groups and associations are supporting a society with equal rights for everyone. However, in the war against ISIS, gender (women) and sexual orientation became the main focus for the first time. ISIS fighters believe that if they are killed by women in the Syrian Democratic Forces (SDF), they will not go to heaven.

In March 2017, TQILA (which stands for: "Queer Rebellion and Salvation Army") was founded as part of the International People's Revolutionary Guerrilla Forces (IRPGF), a volunteer army made up of radical leftist fighters from around the world. They supported the Syrian Democratic Forces in the attack on the ISIS base in Raqqa. Photos showing TQILA masked militants holding a banner reading "These faggots are killing fascists!" in front of bombed concrete buildings in Raqqa created excitement on the internet. An SDF spokesperson denied that the group is an official member of the coalition, but the group has significant support from the Kurds. The group posted a photo alongside its banner showing Heval Mahîr - the supreme commander of all foreign SDF brigades - with a purple flag. A few years later, a video was released in which Heval Mahîr talks about cooperation with TQILA in Raqqa.

== See also ==
- Murder of Doski Azad
