= Vatan ve Hürriyet =

Turkish revolutionary organization

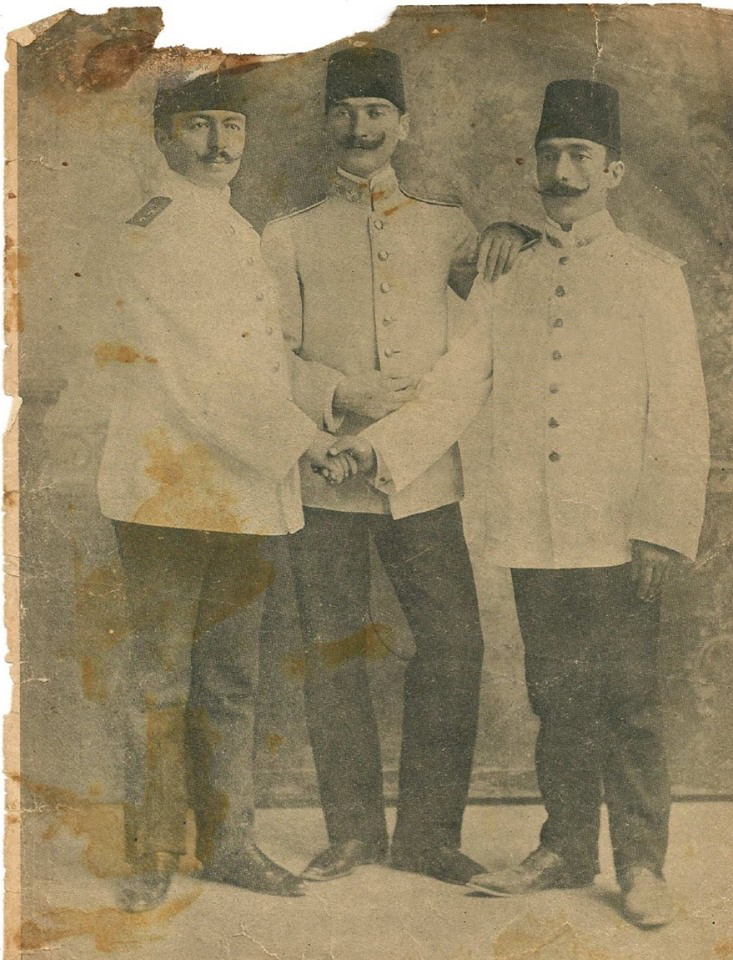
Intern officers for staff in the Ottoman Army. Left to right: Halil, Mustafa Kemal, and Lütfi Müfit, Beirut, 1906.

Vatan ve Hürriyet (Turkish for "Motherland and Liberty") was a small, secret revolutionary society of reformist officers opposed to the autocratic regime of Ottoman sultan Abdul Hamid II in the early 20th century. It was started as an expansion of the Vatan Cemiyeti ("Motherland Society") in Thessaloniki by the future founder of the Republic of Turkey, Mustafa Kemal Atatürk and Mustafa Cantekin while Mustafa Kemal Atatürk was secretly staying in Thessaloniki with his mother Zübeyde Hanım during his exile in Damascus in 1906. The members of the society included Ömer Naci Soykan and two of his teachers from military school.

Vatan Cemiyeti was founded in Damascus earlier in 1906 by, then a military officer, Mustafa Kemal Atatürk, Müfit Özdeş, Hacı Mustafa and two more of their officer friends. The mission of Vatan Cemiyeti was to successfully carry out the liberal revolution and materialize the ideals of the founders. This society was the pioneer of many more liberal revolutionary societies to come.

Later in 1907 Vatan ve Hürriyet merged with İttihat ve Terakki and Mustafa Kemal Atatürk was left behind by the movement while he was back in Damascus.
