= Independence Tribunal =

Court established during the War of Independence

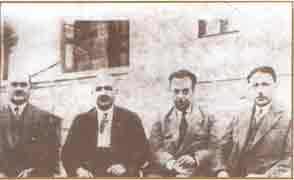
Members of the Ankara Independence Court; from left to right: Kılıç Ali Bey, "Kel" Ali Bey, Necip Ali Bey, and Reşit Galip Bey

An Independence Tribunal (Turkish: İstiklâl Mahkemesi, plural İstiklâl Mahkemeleri) was a court invested with superior authority and the first were established in 1920 during the Turkish War of Independence in order to prosecute those who were against the system of the government. Eight such courts were established. They were located in Ankara, Eskişehir, Konya, Isparta, Sivas, Kastamonu, Pozantı, and Diyarbakır. All but the Ankara court were terminated in 1921.

After the law authorizing the Independence Courts was passed, the former commander of Turkish Armed Forces, General İsmet İnönü, proposed founding 14 Independence Courts. Only 7 courts were established, as it was felt that there would not be enough cases to justify fourteen courts. One month after the establishment of the courts, another court in Diyarbakır was established, bringing the total number to eight.

After the end of the war, many felt that the Courts were no longer needed. Although the government hoped to extend the life of the Courts, opposition pressure led to the closure of seven of the Independence Courts in 1921.

== The Independence Tribunals of 1925 ==
In March 1925, the Law on the Maintenance of Order allowed that Independence Tribunals were reinstated in Ankara and Diyarbakır. The re-establishment was opposed by members of the Progressive Republican Party (TCF), who voiced concerns that they could issue death sentences without the permission of the Grand National Assembly. The Tribunal in Ankara prosecuted members of the TCF for their alleged links with the Sheikh Said revolt. The Party was closed down on the 5 June 1925, but the politicians were later acquitted and released.

In Diyarbakır the Tribunal was reinstated to counter the Sheikh Said rebellion. More than 7000 people were arrested by orders of the Independence tribunals and 660 people were executed In order to suppress the revolt. The Independence Tribunal in Diyarbakir prosecuted and sentenced the most. 5010 people were prosecuted of which 2779 were found not guilty and 420 sentenced to death.
