= Uprising of Sheikh Ubeydullah =

Kurdish uprising

Sheikh Ubeydullah uprising
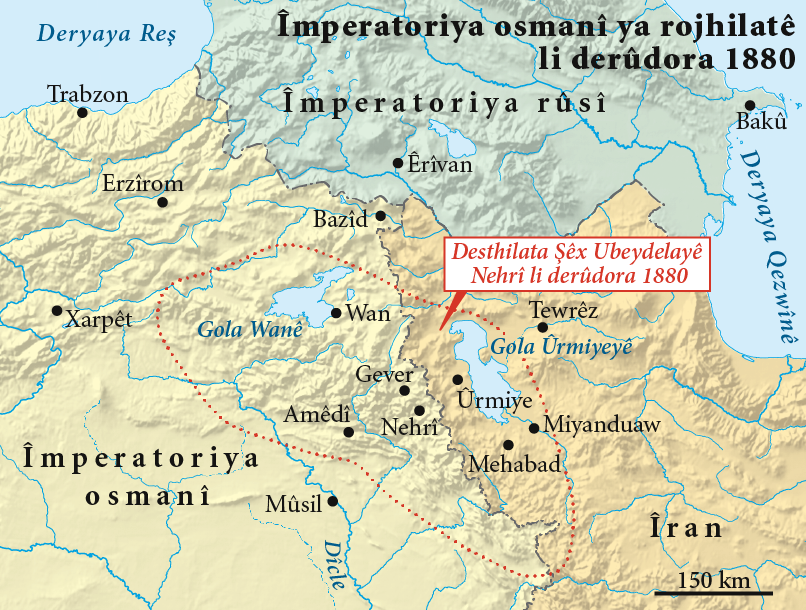
- Territory under the uprisings control (dashed red line)
Date	1879–1881
Location	Ottoman Empire and Iran
Result	Defeat of Sheikh Ubeydullah

Belligerents
(Kurdistan Region) Kurdish tribes	Qajar Iran; Local Azerbaijanis; (Austria-Hungary) Austrian Officers Ottoman Empire

Commanders and leaders
(Kurdistan Region) Sheikh Ubeydullah (Kurdistan Region) Abdulkadir Ubeydullah (Kurdistan Region) Sheikh Muhammad Said (Kurdistan Region) Siddiq Ubeydullah	Unknown

Strength
Over 80,000 (Note: During the revolt against Qajars)	Unknown

Casualties and losses
Unknown	2,000–4,000 Azeri Turks massacred
- The massacred victims were mostly Azerbaijani Shias, but involved some Armenians and Jews.

The Uprising of Sheikh Ubeydullah was a Kurdish uprising against the Ottoman Empire in 1879 and Qajar Iran between 1880 and 1881. Both were lead by Sheikh Ubeydullah, the first modern Kurdish nationalist to lead an uprising. He was also part of the Shamdinan Naqshbandi family, who had considerable influence, disposed over large amounts of donations, owned several villages in the region and many Kurdish tribal leaders were devout followers of him. The initial cause for the uprisings were the outcome of the Russo-Turkish war in 1877–1878 and the Treaty of Berlin which provided the Christian Armenians and the Nestorian Assyrians with considerable rights and autonomy, to which he did not agree to.

== Uprising against the Ottoman Empire ==
The possibility of a first uprising against the Ottoman Empire was given when the Herki tribe had a dispute with the Kaymakam of Yüksekova in 1879. Sheikh Ubeydullah sent out messengers to several Kurdish chieftains in order to gain their support and troops for an uprising against the Ottoman Empire. He managed to raise a small contingent of nine hundred tribes men which was led by his son Abdulkadir Ubeydullah onto Amadiya. But the Ottomans were informed by a rival Kurdish chieftain ahead of the uprising, and therefore deployed troops to Amadya as well. The uprising failed and was quickly subdued by the Ottomans. The Kurdish chieftains were not as trustworthy as hoped by Sheikh Ubeydullah, and preferred to expand their own areas of influence with raids. Sheikh Ubeydullah then also changed his mind and reassured the Sultan of his loyalty. The Ottomans reacted very to the Sheikhs pleasure, removed the Kaymakam of Yüksekova and encouraged him very cordially to find an agreement with the local Ottoman authorities.

== Uprising against the Qajar Iran ==
=== Preparations ===
As Ubeydullah prepared for an uprising against Iran, he relied on the support of the Ottomans. Sheikh Ubeydullah's troops still possessed weapons they received from the Ottomans during the Russo-Turkish war. For a while, Christian Assyrians supported the uprising because it was presented as a way to protect them from raids by Kurdish bandits, which neither the Ottomans or the Iranians were able or willing to prevent. In September 1880, Ubeydullah wrote to Joseph Cochrane, elaborating what the Qajar Empire had done to upset Kurdish tribes. In August 1880, the decision for an uprising was taken after a meeting of about 220 Kurdish chieftains. The forces of Sheikh Ubeydullah were well equipped, they had a large number of breech loading Martini rifles.

=== Uprising ===
80,000 rebels charged against the Iranians and initially the uprising was a success. Beginning in the southwest of Lake Urmia, the insurgents advanced across the northern Ottoman–Iranian borderlands, taking Mangur, Lahijan and Sardasht before reaching Mahabad, the biggest city in Iranian Kurdistan. Their operations also extended towards Miandoab and Maragheh. The territory initially seized by the insurgents was estimated at approximately 20,000 square kilometres. Ubeydullah's troops were deployed into three separate forces, of which his sons led the first two. The first force heading to Mahabad was led by Abdulkadir Ubeydullah, the second force heading to Marageh was led by Siddiq Ubeydullah, and the third force of 5,000 men were led by, his brother in law, Sheikh Muhammad Said. Iranian soldiers were not well-equipped like the rebels, who soon occupied Mahabad and Maragheh. The capture of Tabriz was a failure, so instead the rebels looted captured territories. In the first two weeks of the uprising, Sheikh Ubeydullah fought in battles and attempted to seize Urmia. The city's Shia population refused to surrender to the Sunni rebels, who in the end couldn't capture it.

Massacre of Miandoab

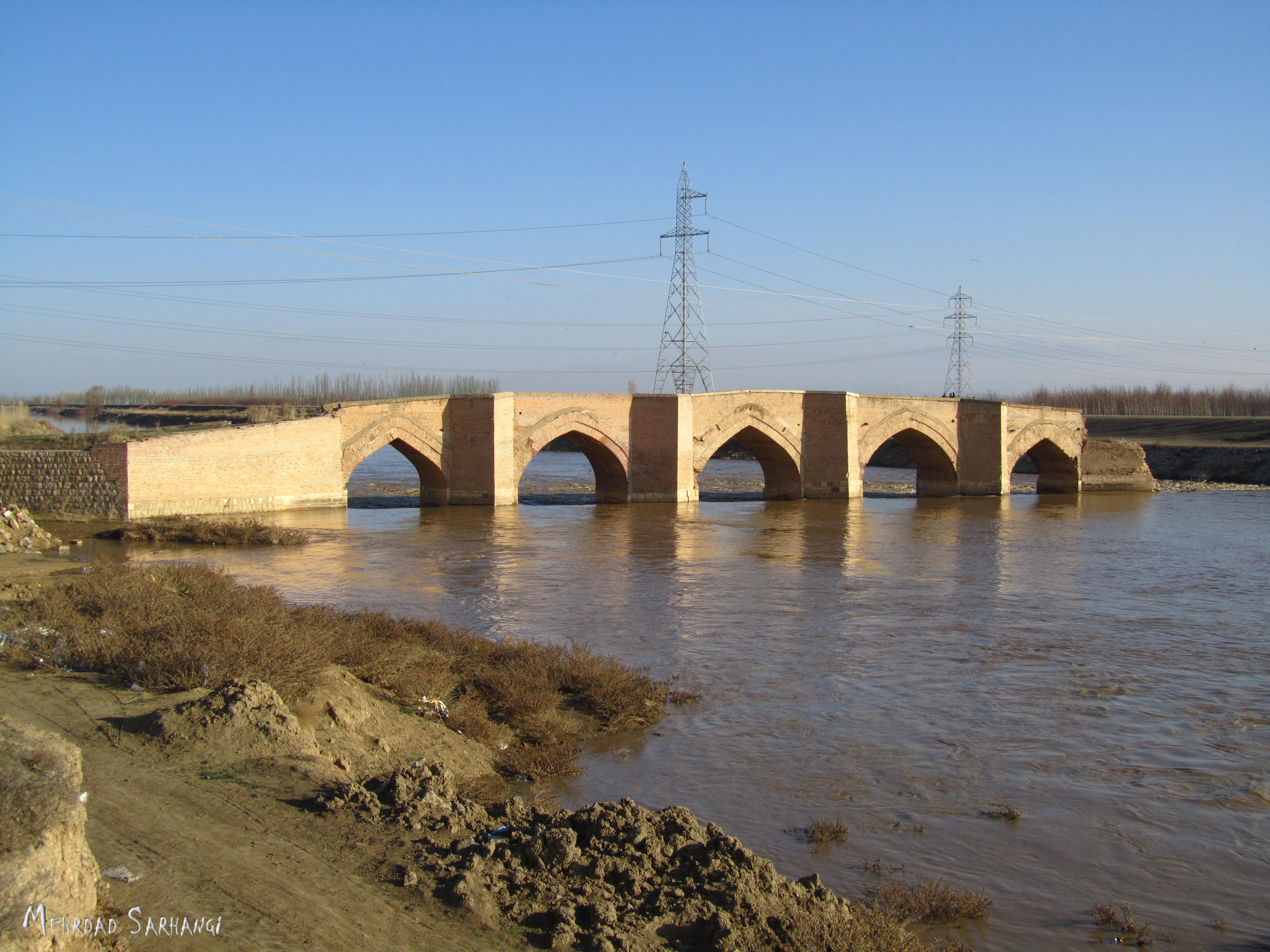
Miandoab bridge.

When news of Sheikh ʿAbd al-Qadir’s advance spread, several Sunni villages in the vicinity of Miandoab appealed to him for assistance, warning that otherwise the Ajams (Azerbaijanis) would kill them. In response, ʿAbd al-Qadir sent one of his maternal uncles at the head of 200 horsemen to reconnoitre the region. The detachment encountered Shiite forces and was defeated, with most of its members killed. Among the dead was ʿAbd al-Qadir’s uncle, whose head was severed and publicly displayed. When ʿAbd al-Qadir subsequently advanced, the Ajam forces fled, leaving severed limbs and heads behind. Upon seeing his uncle’s dismembered body, the young commander ordered retaliation through a massacre of Miandoab’s inhabitants. The inhabitants attempted to resist but it failed. According to the account of the Ghoryans, 800 Muslims, 20 Armenians and 50 Jews of different ages and backgrounds were killed. The massacre was followed by widespread pillaging in the surrounding areas of Maragha and Miandoab, further dispersing the rebel forces. Historical accounts give different estimates of the number of people killed. Captain Gerard, who visited the region a year after the rebellion, estimated the death toll at 2,000. Mrs. Cochran reported that more than 4,000 people had been killed and 150 villages sacked. Reverend Wilson, meanwhile, estimated that 3,000 people, including Shiites, Jews and Armenians, had been killed. Accounts also differ regarding the number of troops involved. Kurdish commander Hamza Agha reported to Sheikh ʿAbd al-Qadir that 4,000 troops had accompanied him and ʿAbd al-Qadir, while Reverend Wilson estimated their number at between 10,000 and 30,000. The neighbouring town of Mianduab was inhabited by Shia Azeri Turks mostly. The Azeris later took revenge on the local sunni Kurds then. The Shia-Sunni division increased following the event, it remained firmly in the local memory.

The Iranian army, led by Austrian Officers, slowly gained the upper hand and pushed the Kurds back to the Ottoman border. Abdulkadir Ubeydullah and his force retreated to Mahabad, which they held for a few days, because of Qajar forces coming from Tabriz. After eight weeks, the Kurdish rebels retreated and Sheikh Ubeydullah returned to Nehri. Eventually, Ubeydullah travelled to Istanbul asking the Ottomans for diplomatic support. Following his travel, the Ottomans began extensive negotiations with the Qajars on how to solve the conflict. Despite his rebellion against them in 1879, the Ottomans didn't want to lose the possibility of assistance from Sheikh Ubeydullah's troops in an eventual war against the Qajars in the future. After all, Sheikh Ubeydullah was able to raise a considerable number of troops. Both the Ottomans and the Qajars demanded reparations from the other side due to their losses they experienced from Ubeydullah's rebellions.

== Aftermath ==
In August 1882, Sheikh Ubeydullah lost hopes for negotiating his peoples’ independence, and left Istanbul to return to his hometown Nehri. The Ottomans ordered the capture of Sheikh Ubeydullah in October 1882, as a result of pressure from the European powers, due to Ubeydullah's treatment of the Christian Nestorians. After his capture, he was brought to Istanbul and then exiled to Hejaz.

== Legacy ==
In a clear indication of Kurdish nationalist intentions, Ubeydullah wrote in a letter to a Christian missionary in the region:

"The Kurdish nation, consisting of more than 500,000 families is a people apart. Their religion is different, and their laws and customs distinct... We are also a nation apart. We want our affairs to be in our hands, so that in the punishment of our own offenders we may be strong and independent, and have privileges like other nations... This is our objective... Otherwise, the whole of Kurdistan will take matter into their own hands, as they are unable to put up with these continual evil deeds and the oppression, which they suffer at the hands of the Persian and Ottoman governments."

Sheikh Ubeydullah is regarded as the first Kurdish leader whose cause was nationalist and who wished to establish an ethnic Kurdish state. In the words of Kurdologist and Iranologist Garnik Asatrian:

In the recent period of Kurdish history, a crucial point is defining the nature of the rebellions from the end of the 19th and up to the 20th century―from Sheikh Ubaydullah’s revolt to Simko’s (Simitko) mutiny. The overall labelling of these events as manifestations of the Kurdish national-liberation struggle against Turkish or Iranian suppressors is an essential element of the Kurdish identity-makers’ ideology. (...) With the Kurdish conglomeration, as I said above, far from being a homogeneous entity―either ethnically, culturally, or linguistically (see above, fn. 5; also fn. 14 below)―the basic component of the national doctrine of the Kurdish identity-makers has always remained the idea of the unified image of one nation, endowed respectively with one language and one culture. The chimerical idea of this imagined unity has become further the fundament of Kurdish identity-making, resulting in the creation of fantastic ethnic and cultural prehistory, perversion of historical facts, falsification of linguistic data, etc. (for recent Western views on Kurdish identity, see Atabaki/Dorleijn 1990).
