= Halid Beg Cibran =

Kurdish politician

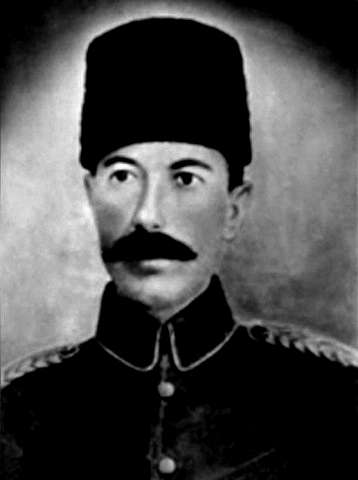
- Born: 1882; Varto, Bitlis vilayet, Ottoman Empire (now in Muş Province, Turkey)
- Died: 14 April 1925 (aged 42–43); Bitlis
- Cause of death: Execution
- Education: Ottoman Military College
- Organization: Azadî

Miralay Halid Beg Cibran (Kurdish: Xalîd Beg Cibranî; 1882 – 14 April 1925) was an Ottoman-Kurdish soldier in the Ottoman Army and chairman of the Azadî organization.

== Early life and education ==
He was born in Varto in the Bitlis vilayet in 1882. His father Mahmud Bey was the chieftain (ağa) of the Sunni Kurdish Cibran tribe. The Cibran was an influential Kurmanji speaking Kurdish tribe and used to work closely with the Ottoman government. In exchange the Cibrans were allowed to set up regiments for the Hamidiye cavalry. Halid Beg has attended the Aşiret (tribal) school in Istanbul. Afterwards he has followed up on his studies at the Ottoman Military College.

== Military career ==
In 1892, he became the leader of the second Hamidiye regiment and was in charge of leading the 1894 attack on Zeynel Talu Hermekli, the son of the Alevi Ibrahim Talu, who was killed by troops of the second Hamidiye regiment under the command of Halid Beg Cibran in 1906. The Alevi tribes wouldn't forget such treatment by the Sunni, and wouldn't join the Sheikh Said Rebellion in 1925. During World War I, he was deployed in the eastern front, and fought against the Armenians and Russians. It is reported that, concerned about the possible betrayal of the Alevi Kurds, he sent a message to General Kazim Pasha, urging him to refuse their support in the battles. During the Turkish War of Independence, he sided with Mustafa Kemal (Atatürk) and took a stand against the Ottoman government in İstanbul.

== Kurdish rebellions ==
After the war, he returned to the Dersim region, made first attempts to counter the Turkish nationalism and support the Kurdish cause, encouraging the Kurds to speak their language. Following the signing of the Treaty of Sèvres in 1920, he garnered support for the Kurdish aims for self rule. He visited various towns in the region, such as Hınıs, Varto, Bingöl, Bulanık or Malazgirt and spoke to the Kurdish notables. But after the Koçgiri uprising, he began to oppose the Kemalists. According to Kurds reporting to the British intelligence, he established Azadi in Erzurum, the city where he formerly was a military commander, in 1921 of which he became its president. The Azadi was a Kurdish society which later would become a leading force in the Sheikh Said Rebellion. He led the uprising at Beytüşşebap in 1924.

He was captured in Erzurum on 20 December 1924 reportedly after having been accused of his involvement in the Beytüssebap revolt by Yusuf Zia Bey (another leader of the Beytüssebap revolt). Both were courtmartialed in Bitlis and Halid Beg Cibran was hanged on the 14 April 1925.
