= Sheikh Ubeydullah =

Kurdish Ottoman politician (died 1883)

- شێخ عوبەیدوڵڵای نەھری
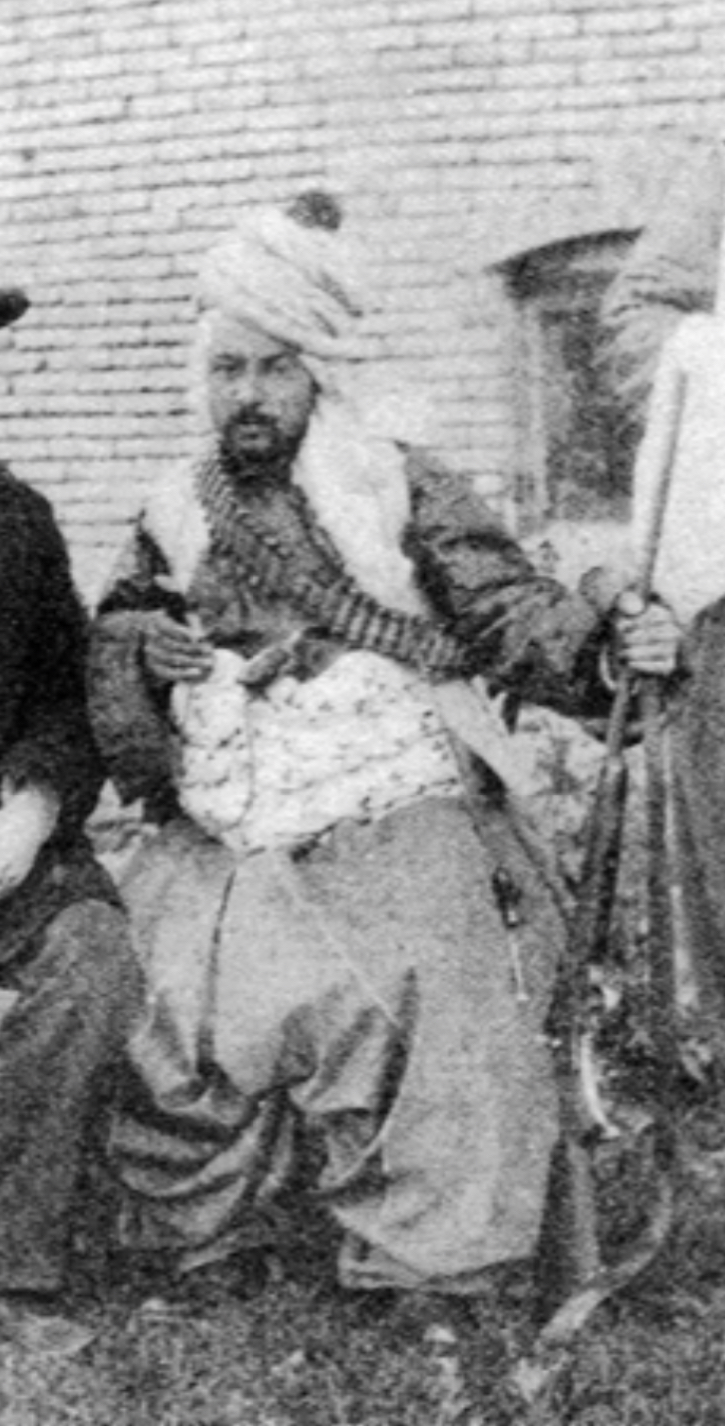
- Sheikh Ubeydullah around 1880

Personal life
- Born: 1826 Nehri, Hakkâri dynasty
- Died: 1883 (aged 56–57) Mecca, Hejaz, Ottoman Empire
- Home town: Nehri, Soran Emirate
- Parent: Sheikh Taha (father)
- Known for: Leader of the first modern Kurdish nationalist movement
- Other name: Sayyid Ubeydullah of Nehri

Religious life
- Religion: Islam
- Denomination: Sunni Islam
- Order: Naqshbandi Sufi order

Muslim leader
- Based in: Ottoman Empire
- Predecessor: Sheikh Salih (his uncle)
- Previous post: Leader of Kurdish nationalist revolt

Sheikh Ubeydullah (Note: Kurdish: شێخ عوبەیدوڵڵای نەھری ,Şêx Ubeydelayê Nehrî) (1826–1883), also known as Sayyid Ubeydullah, was the leader of the first modern Kurdish nationalist struggle. Ubeydullah demanded recognition from the Ottoman Empire and Qajar Iran authorities for an independent Kurdish state, or Kurdistan, which he would govern without interference from Ottoman or Qajar authorities.

Sheikh Ubeydullah was an influential landowner in the 19th century and a member of the powerful Kurdish Shamdinan family from Nehri. He was the son of Sheikh Taha and a nephew to Sheikh Salih, from whom he inherited the leadership of the Sunni Sufi Naqshbandi order in Shamdinan. He united the various Kurdish tribes of the region to begin his rebellion against both the Ottomans and Qajars. After his rebellion was suppressed, he was exiled first to Istanbul, then to Hijaz where he died.

== Personal life ==
Sheikh Ubaydallah was born 1826 in Nehri, then Kaza of Şemdinan, Van Eyalet, Ottoman Empire. The village is now Bağlar and is located in the Nochiya region. The family owned large estates with 200 villages in the Ottoman Empire and Iran. They cultivated tobacco. Ubeydallah's descendants today bear the surname Geylan. He came from an influential family of spiritual leaders. The family traced its ancestry back to Abdul Qadir Gilani, the 11th-century founder of the Qadiri order, and ultimately to the Prophet Muhammad. As descendants of the Prophet, they bore the title of Sayyid. Abdul Qadir Gilani‘s son, Abdulaziz, migrated to Akre, north of Mosul. His descendants migrated further north toward Hakkari. Mullah Saleh then settled in the village of Nehri. With the spread of the Naqshbandi in the Kurdish regions at the beginning of the 19th century, the family also changed their order and became members of the Naqshbandi order.

Sheikh Ubaydalla's father was Sheikh Sayyid Taha, who succeeded his uncle Sheikh Abdullah as the leading sheikh. As a sheikh, Sheikh Sayyid Taha had great influence over the Kurds in the border region of the Ottoman Empire and Iran. After his death, he was succeeded by his brother Saleh. Ubaydalla himself succeeded his uncle Saleh.

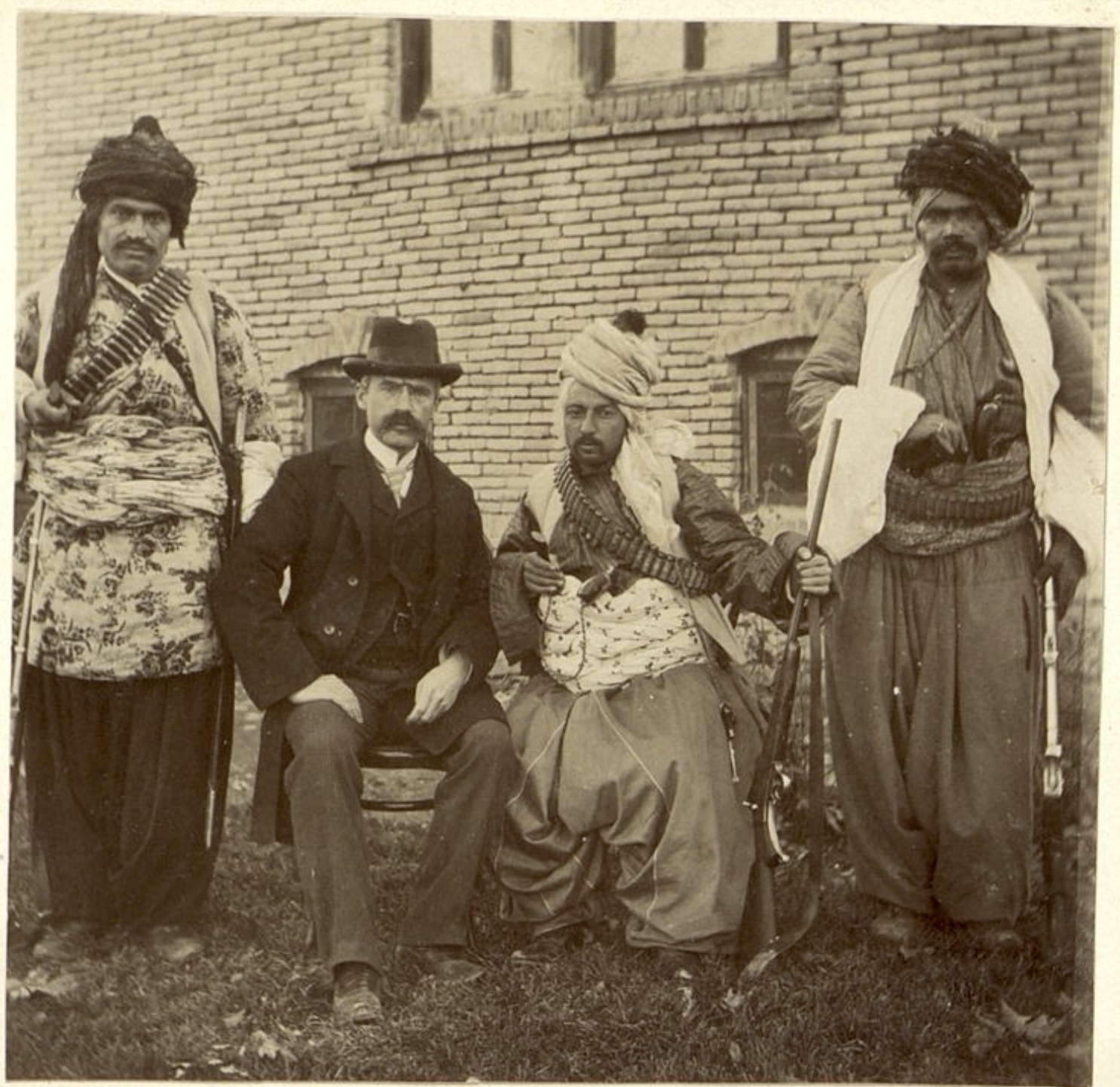
Cochran seating with Sheikh Ubeydullah, around 1880

The American missionary Joseph Cochran characterized Ubeydallah as a charismatic, deeply religious, and upright person. S. G. Wilson described him as the most important religious leader among the Sunni Kurds. He had a solid theological education and was a connoisseur of Arabic and Iranian literature.

Sheikh Ubaydalla exercised his temporal power with great authority. He punished lawbreakers harshly and harbored a dislike for Turkish and Iranian officials.

== Rise to power ==
The emergence of Islamic scholars and leaders, or Sheikhs, as national leaders among the Kurds was the result of the elimination of hereditary semi-autonomous Kurdish principalities in the Ottoman Empire, especially following the Ottoman centralization policies of the early 19th century. Sheikh Ubeydullah was one of several religious leaders who were there to fill the void and reestablish a sense of lawfulness in the former principalities that had been since left to feuding chieftains. Despite previous revolts by Kurdish leaders to reassert control over territories, mainly their own former principalities, Sheikh Ubeydullah is regarded as the first Kurdish leader whose cause was nationalist and who wished to establish an ethnic Kurdish state.

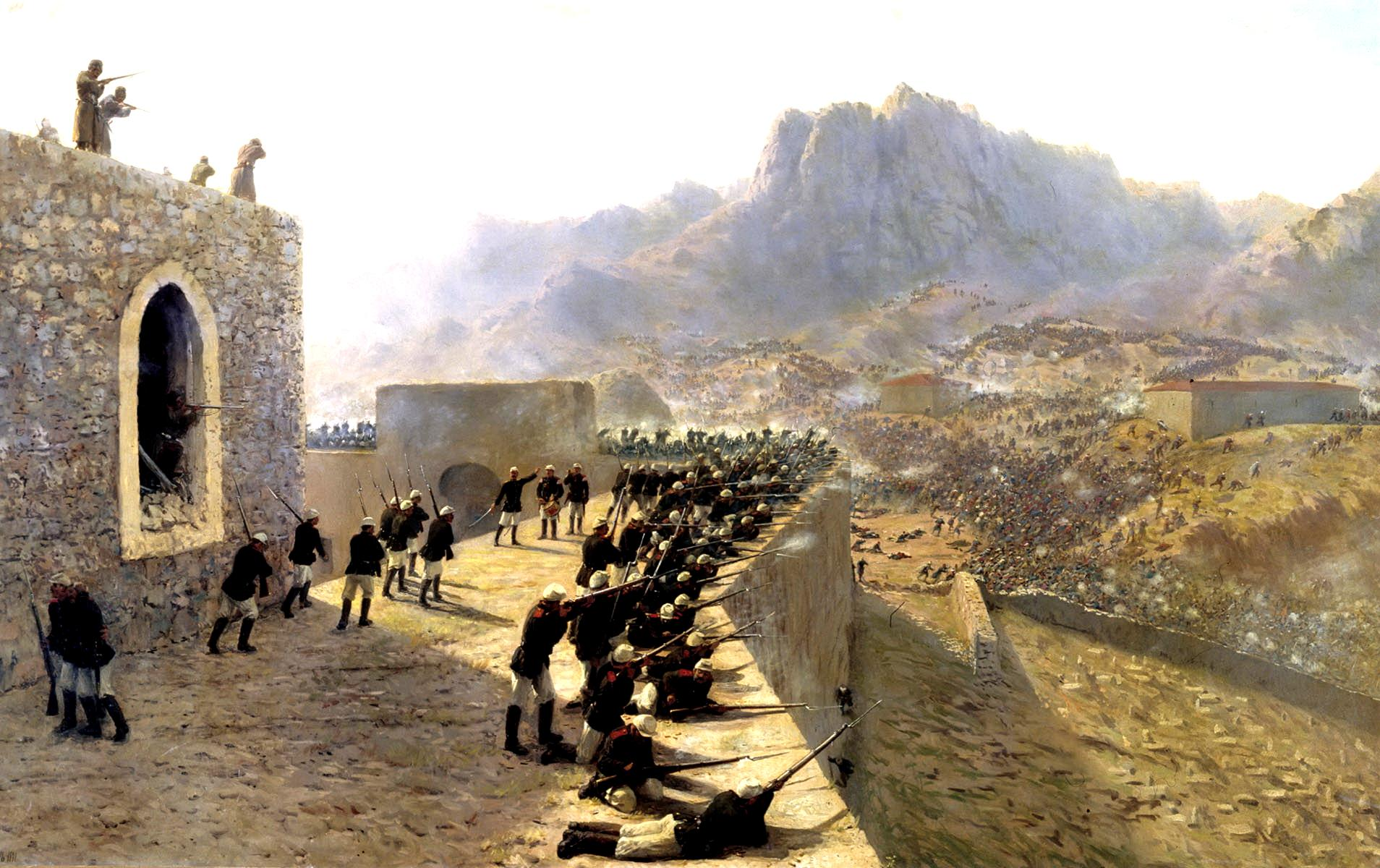
The defence of Bayazit 1877/1878

Sheikh Ubeydullah was from an already powerful family, the Şemdinan from the region of the same name – Şemdinan – who owned considerable amounts of land in the Kurdish areas of the Ottoman Empire. During the Russo-Turkish War in the late 1870s, Ubeydullah led the Kurdish tribal forces, defending the Ottoman Empire against the Russians. In the aftermath of the war, he filled a political vacuum left by the devastation in the area and assumed the Kurdish leadership in the region.

== Personality and Kurdish nationalism ==
In a clear indication of Kurdish nationalist intentions, Ubeydullah wrote in a letter to a Christian missionary in the region:

"The Kurdish nation, consisting of more than 500,000 families is a people apart. Their religion is different, and their laws and customs distinct... We are also a nation apart. We want our affairs to be in our hands, so that in the punishment of our own offenders we may be strong and independent, and have privileges like other nations... This is our objective... Otherwise, the whole of Kurdistan will take matter into their own hands, as they are unable to put up with these continual evil deeds and the oppression, which they suffer at the hands of the Persian and Ottoman governments."

Ubeydullah was able to gain the military support of Kurdish tribesmen as well as Nestorian Christians from the Hakkari region. A letter written by a Christian missionary who was in constant contact with Ubeydullah noted, "The Shaykh wrote in his paper a great deal about the Nestorian Christians there, praising them as the best subjects of the Sultan. The Sultan objected to such language, and three times returned the letter for correction. Finally, the Shaykh said, "I don't know much about politics, but I do know something about truth telling, and this is the truth."

== Expeditions and subsequent fall ==
The possibility of a first uprising against the Ottoman Empire was given when the Herki tribe had a dispute with the Kaymakam of Yüksekova in 1879. Sheikh Ubeydullah sent out messengers to several Kurdish chieftains in order to gain their support and troops for an uprising against the Ottoman Empire. He managed to raise a small contingent of nine hundred tribes men which was led by his son Abdulkadir Ubeydullah onto Amadiya. But the Ottomans were informed by a rival Kurdish chieftain ahead of the uprising, and therefore deployed troops to Amadya as well. The uprising failed and was quickly subdued by the Ottomans. The Kurdish chieftains were not as trustworthy as hoped by Sheikh Ubeydullah, and preferred to expand their own areas of influence with raids. Sheikh Ubeydullah then also changed his mind and reassured the Sultan of his loyalty. The Ottomans reacted very to the Sheikhs pleasure, removed the Kaymakam of Yüksekova and encouraged him very cordially to find an agreement with the local Ottoman authorities.

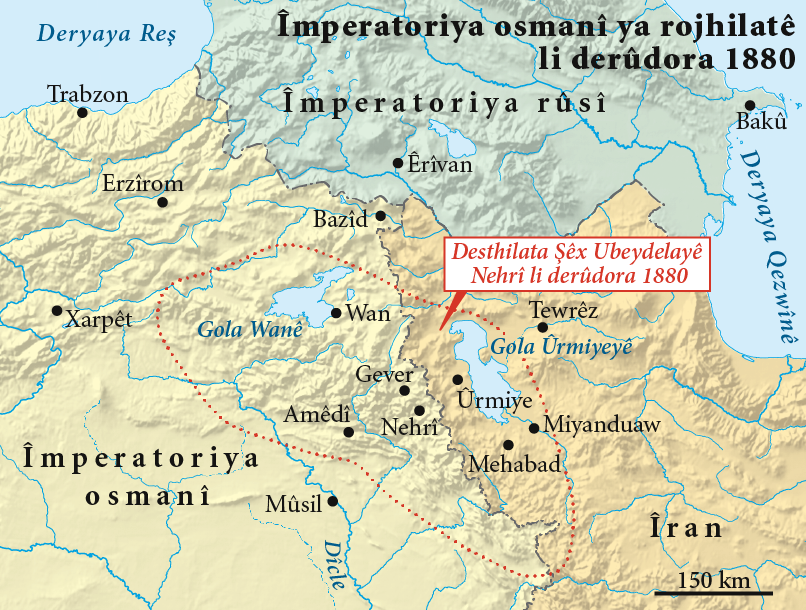
Map over uprising, 1880

As Ubeydullah prepared for an uprising against Iran, he relied on the support of the Ottomans. Sheikh Ubeydullah's troops still possessed weapons they received from the Ottomans during the Russo-Turkish war. For a while, Christian Assyrians supported the uprising because it was presented as a way to protect them from raids by Kurdish bandits, which neither the Ottomans or the Iranians were able or willing to prevent. In September 1880, Ubeydullah wrote to Joseph Cochrane, elaborating what the Qajar Empire had done to upset Kurdish tribes. In August 1880, the decision for an uprising was taken after a meeting of about 220 Kurdish chieftains. The forces of Sheikh Ubeydullah were well equipped, they had a large number of breech loading Martini rifles.

Sheikh Ubeydullah was able to successfully assert his control over the area by gaining the support of Kurdish tribesmen who were hopeful of his objective to restore order in the war-ravaged region. British correspondence during the height of Ubeydullah's power indicates that he was able to successful assert control over a vast region that stretched the former Bohtan, Badinan, Hakkari, and Ardalan confederacies. A late nineteenth century writer, Lord George Curzon, wrote:

A chieftain named Shaykh Obeidallah acquired a great reputation for personal sanctity...and gradually came to be looked upon as the head of Kurdish nationality.

Also the British envoy to Iran Abbott reported in July 1880, that Ubeydullah has purchased a considerable amount of villages and territories in both sides of the border between Iran and the Ottoman Empire which might cause a challenge to British influence in the region.

Ubaydallah later turned his attention to Iran. After a victory in Iran against the weakened Qajar Turks, he wanted to return to the Ottomans with fresh troops. He claimed a Kurdish state, arguing, among other things, that the Kurds were a people with their own language and identity.

In 1880, Ubeydullah's militia with the support of mercenaries from the Assyrian Tiyari tribe invaded the northwestern Kurdish territories of Qajar dynasty in attempt to expand his control. 80,000 rebels charged against the Iranians and initially the uprising was a success. Ubeydullah's troops were deployed into three separate forces, of which his sons led the first two. The first force heading to Mahabad was led by Abdulkadir Ubeydullah, the second force heading to Marageh was led by Siddiq Ubeydullah, and the third force of 5,000 men were led by, his brother in law, Sheikh Muhammad Said. Iranian soldiers were not well-equipped like the rebels, who soon occupied Mahabad and Maragheh. The sheikh then sent envoys to Miandoab to buy supplies, among other things. However, all of them were killed there, whereupon the sheikh called his son to attack Miandoab. Many residents fled, and 2,000 to 4,000 people fell victim to the attackers. The troops captured and plundered the city. The capture of Tabriz was a failure, so instead the rebels looted captured territories. In the first two weeks of the uprising, Sheikh Ubeydullah fought in battles and attempted to seize Urmia. The city's Shia population refused to surrender to the Kurdish Sunni rebels, who in the end couldn't capture it. Ubeydullah demanded recognition of a Kurdish state and his rule over the region. Abdulkadir Ubeydullah and his force retreated to Mahabad, which they held for a few days, because of Qajar forces coming from Tabriz.

The Iranian army, led by Austrian Officers, slowly gained the upper hand and pushed the Kurds back to the Ottoman border. There, they were intercepted by Ottoman soldiers and handed over to the Iranians. The Iranian troops killed numerous Sunni Kurds, including many Nestorians near Lake Urmia. Between 60,000 and 70,000 Kurds fled from the army into the Ottoman Empire. The devastation in the country, especially around Urmia, was enormous; many towns were looted.

After eight weeks, the Kurdish rebels retreated and Sheikh Ubeydullah returned to Nehri. Eventually, Ubeydullah travelled to Istanbul asking the Ottomans for diplomatic support. Following his travel, the Ottomans began extensive negotiations with the Qajars on how to solve the conflict. Despite his rebellion against them in 1879, the Ottomans didn't want to lose the possibility of assistance from Sheikh Ubeydullah's troops in an eventual war against the Qajars in the future. After all, Sheikh Ubeydullah was able to raise a considerable number of troops. Both the Ottomans and the Qajars demanded reparations from the other side due to their losses they experienced from Ubeydullah's rebellions.

Facing attacks from both sides of his territory, Ubeydullah eventually surrendered to Ottoman authorities in 1881 and was brought to Istanbul. There he was interviewed by the American missionary Henry Otis Dwight to whom he explained that what he wanted for Kurdistan, was inspired by the Masnavi of the Sufi Celaleddin Rumi. From Istanbul he escaped and returned to Nehri for some time. In 1882, he attempted to launch another rebellion, but he was soon re-arrested by the Ottoman Empire and sent into exile to Hijaz, (present-day Saudi Arabia).

== Destiny ==
Under pressure from other states and Iran, the Ottoman Sultan intervened and summoned the Sheikh to Istanbul in June 1881. England demanded his punishment or surrender to the Iranians. Although Sheikh Ubeydallah was received with full honors, he remained a prisoner at court. He assured the Sultan that his rebellion against Iran was a response to the Iranians' predatory policies.

After several months in Istanbul, he was able to escape. During the Ramadan celebrations in July 1882, he fled by ship via Poti back to his home village. This alarmed Iran. The Ottomans sent soldiers to arrest him. The sheikh barricaded himself in the fortress of Oramar and offered the government exile in Mosul. Eventually, he was escorted to Mosul by Ottoman soldiers, but his son Seyyit Abdülkadir freed him en route and went into hiding with him in the village of Sheptan. When the Ottomans besieged the village, the sheikh and his son surrendered on November 13, 1882. The sheikh was sent to the Hejaz because the Iranians objected to Mosul. Mosul was still too close to the sheikh's homeland and he had too much influence there.

== Legacy ==
The Sheikh died in the Hejaz in 1883 or 1884. There are different opinions about his place of death. British Ambassador George N. Curzon stated Mecca, while Kurdish historians Mehmed Emin Zeki Taif and Süreyya Bedir Khan Medina were given.

His eldest son, Sheikh Siddik, was later able to return to Nehri. Seyyit Abdulkadir, however, settled in Istanbul and continued to play a major role in Kurdish nationalism.

In the words of Kurdologist and Iranologist Garnik Asatrian:

In the recent period of Kurdish history, a crucial point is defining the nature of the rebellions from the end of the 19th and up to the 20th century―from Sheikh Ubaydullah’s revolt to Simko’s (Simitko) mutiny. The overall labelling of these events as manifestations of the Kurdish national-liberation struggle against Turkish or Iranian suppressors is an essential element of the Kurdish identity-makers’ ideology. (...) With the Kurdish conglomeration, as I said above, far from being a homogeneous entity―either ethnically, culturally, or linguistically (see above, fn. 5; also fn. 14 below)―the basic component of the national doctrine of the Kurdish identity-makers has always remained the idea of the unified image of one nation, endowed respectively with one language and one culture. The chimerical idea of this imagined unity has become further the fundament of Kurdish identity-making, resulting in the creation of fantastic ethnic and cultural prehistory, perversion of historical facts, falsification of linguistic data, etc. (for recent Western views on Kurdish identity, see Atabaki/Dorleijn 1990).
