= Sheikh Said rebellion =

Kurdish rebellion in Turkey (

- Part of Kurdish rebellions in Turkey
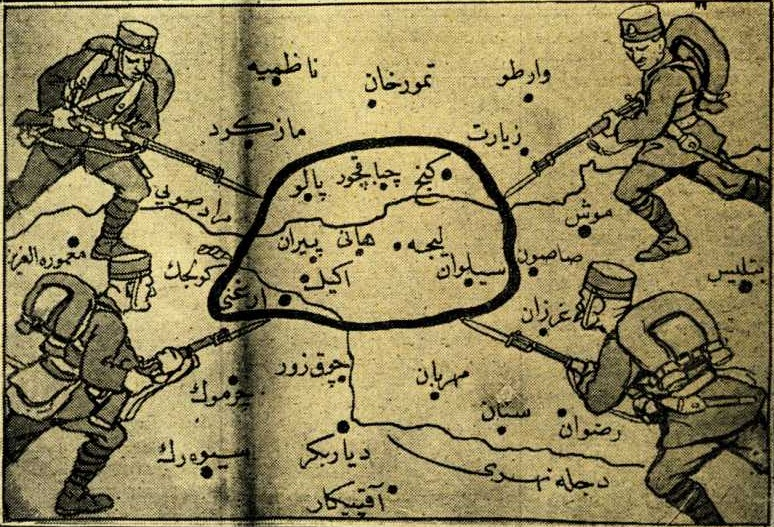
- Art depicting: Turkish soldiers encircling Palu, Çapakçur (present-day: Bingöl), Genc (present-day: Kaleköy, Solhan), Piran, Hani, Lice, Ergani, Eğil and Silvan, Cumhuriyet, 30 March 1925.
Date	13 February 1925 – March 1925
Location	Elazığ, Bingöl, Diyarbakır, Şanlıurfa, Mardin, Muş areas
Result	Turkish victory: Revolt suppressed; Sheikh Said executed

Belligerents
Turkey	Azadî

Commanders and leaders
(Turkey) Mustafa Kemal Pasha (Turkey) Kâzım Pasha (Third Army) (Turkey) Ali Saip Bey (Third Army) (Turkey) Muğlalı Bey (Third Army) (Turkey) Mürsel Pasha (VII Corps) (Turkey) Naci Pasha (V Corps)	Sheikh Said (executed); Abdulkadir Ubeydullah (executed); Halid Beg Cibran (executed); Alişer Ağa; Ibrahim Heski; Baytar Nuri

Strength
February–March: 25,000 men (fewer than 12,000 are armed troops; the rest are unarmed logistical troops); April: 52,000 men (25,000 are armed troops)	15,000 men

Casualties and losses
- Total: 5,000 killed 25,000 displaced

The Sheikh Said rebellion (Kurdish: Serhildana Şêx Seîd; Turkish: Şeyh Said İsyanı) was a Kurdish nationalist and Islamist rebellion in Southeast Anatolia from February to March 1925 led by Sheikh Said and with support of the Azadî movement and local religious and feudal leaders against the newly-founded secular Republic of Turkey. The rebellion was mostly led by Zazas, but also gained support among some of the neighboring Kurmanji-speaking Kurds in the region.

The religious and nationalist background of the Sheikh Said rebellion has been debated by the scholars. The rebellion was described as "the first large-scale nationalist rebellion by the Kurds" by Robert W. Olson.

== Background ==
In the first years of the Turkish Republic, the Turkish state carried out modernist and nationalist reforms on its citizens including Kurdish minority. Mustafa Kemal Pasha, in his speech in Eskişehir on 14 January 1923 about the Mosul-Kirkuk area also addressed the Kurdish issue mentioning: the second issue is the problem of Kurdishness. The British wanted to establish a Kurdish state there (in northern Iraq). If they do, this thought spreads to the Kurds within our borders. To prevent this, we need to cross the border South. In the report the British spokesman sent to London on the 28 November 1919 he allegedly stated; "Even though we don't trust the Kurds, it is our interests to use them." The British Prime Minister Lloyd George, on the 19 May 1920 at the San Remo Conference also allegedly stated that "the Kurds cannot survive without a large state behind them," he says, for the British policy towards the region said: "A new protective admission to all Kurds accustomed to the Turkish administration It will be difficult to bring the British interests to Mosul, where the Kurds live in the mountainous regions and Southern Kurdistan in which they live. It is thought that the region of Mosul could be separated from other parts and connected to a new independent Kurdistan State. However, it would be very difficult to resolve this issue by agreement.

Mosul dispute between the UK and Turkey in Lausanne conference dealt with the bilateral talks, if this were to fail it was decided to have recourse the subject to the League of Nations. On 19 May 1924, the results of the negotiations in Istanbul could not be reached and Britain took the issue on 6 August 1924 to the League of Nations. The Sheikh Said uprising emerged during the days when British occupation forces declared martial law in northern Iraq, removed their officer's permits, and carried their troops to Mosul. In those days, the Colon of Ministers was increasingly under scrutiny, and a powerful British fleet was moving to Basra.

Prior to Sheikh Said's rebellion, the prominent Pashas of the War of Independence worried about the anti-religious and autocratic policy of Atatürk's government and therefore on 17 November 1924, the Terakkiperver Cumhuriyet Fırkası (TCF), the first opposition party in the history of the Republic was established. There was a general consensus that Atatürk's actions were against religion. In the TCF's article which led by Kazım Karabekir it says that "The political party is respectful to the religious beliefs and thoughts". One of the TCF officials, Fethi Bey, said "The members of the TCF are religious. CHF is messing up with the religion, we will save the religion and protect it".

Two weeks before the Sheikh Said incident, in late January 1925, the TCF Erzurum deputy Ziyaeddin Efendi, with heavy criticism of the actions of the ruling CHF in the chair of the Grand National Assembly, said that 'innovation' (bida) had led to the encouragement of "isret" (getting drunk), an increase in prostitution, Muslim women losing their decency and, most important of all, religious customs being dishonored and disregarded by the new regime. The Azadî forces under the lead of Halid Beg Cibran were dominated by the former members of the late Ottoman era Hamidiye regiments, a Kurdish tribal militia established during the reign of Sultan Abdul Hamid II to deal with the Armenians, and sometimes even to keep the Qizilbash under control. According to various historians, the main reason the revolt took place was that various elements of the Turkish society were unhappy with the Turkish Parliament's abolition of the Ottoman Caliphate on 3 March 1924. According to British intelligence reports, the Azadî officers had 11 grievances. Apart from Kurdish cultural demands and complaints of Turkish maltreatment, this list also detailed fears of imminent mass deportations of Kurds. They also registered annoyance that the name Kurdistan did not appear on maps, at restrictions on the Kurdish language and on Kurdish education and objections to alleged Turkish economic exploitation of Kurdish areas, at the expense of Kurds. The revolt was preceded by the smaller and less successful Beytüssebap revolt in September 1924, led by Cibran and Ihsan Nuri on the orders by the prominent Azadî member Ziya Yusuf Bey. The revolt was subdued, and its leaders Cibran and Ziya Yusuf Bey were captured and courtmartialed in Bitlis.

== Participation in the rebellion ==
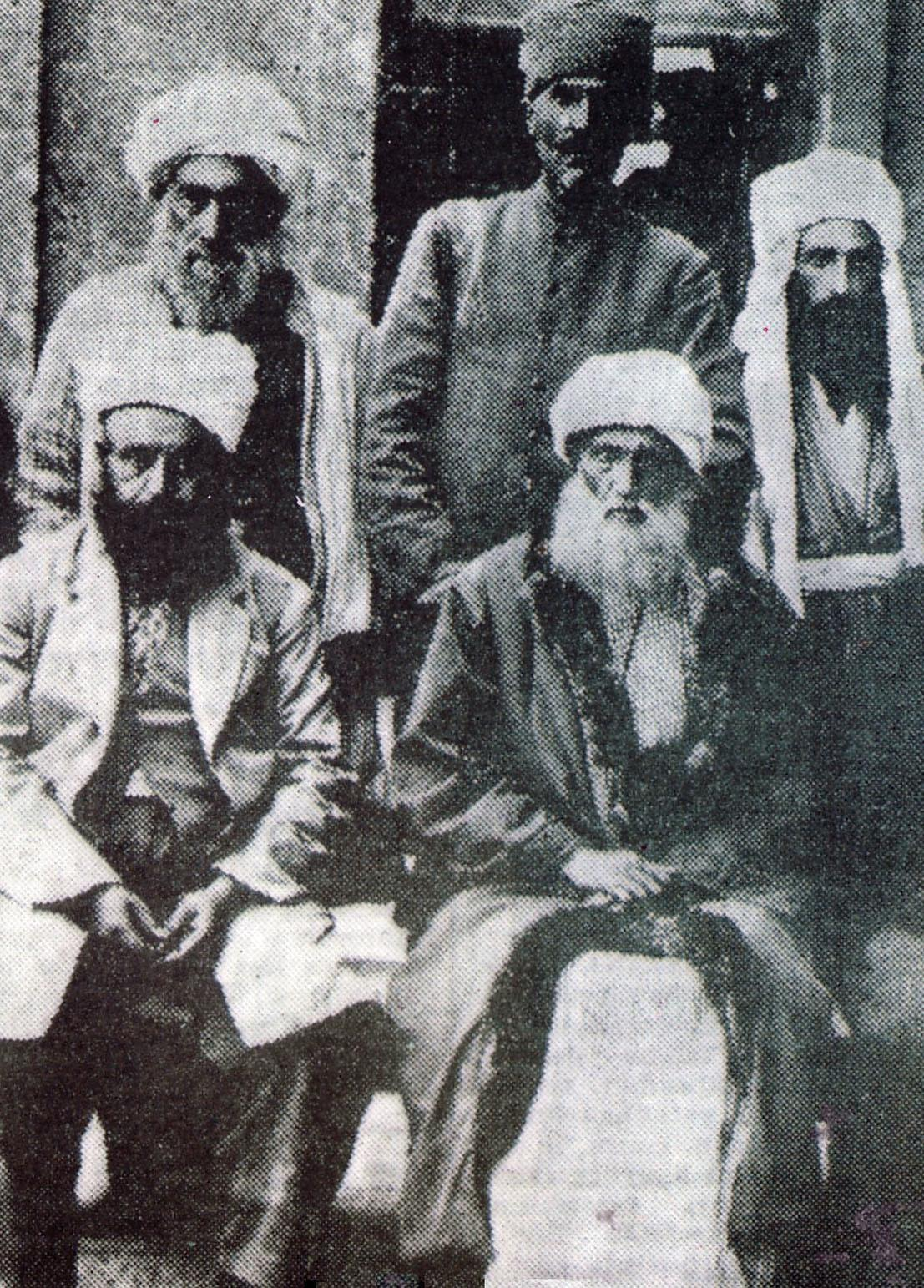
Front row, left to right: Sheikh Sherif, Sheikh Said, back row: Sheikh Hamid, Major Kasim (Kasım Ataç), Sheikh Abdullah.

=== For the rebellion ===
Sheikh Said appealed to all Muslims of Turkey to join in the rebellion being planned. The tribes which actually participated were mostly Kurds and Zazas. Kurds of the Xormak and Herkî, two Kurdish-Qizilbash tribes were the most active and effective opponents of this rebellion since they had experience in confronting the Turkish government. The Azadî, and several Kurdish officers from the Ottoman Empire also supported the rebellion. Historian Robert Olson states that viewing the several sources, an estimated number of 15,000 rebels is about the average of the number of involved rebels which took part in the revolt.

=== Against the rebellion ===
That some Alevi tribes who participated in the Koçgiri rebellion refused to join the rebellion was a major setback as they had a lot of other tribes also desisted from supporting the rebellion, as their leaders preferred to be in good standing with the Turkish government. Some claim British assistance was sought realizing that Kurdistan could not stand alone. The Kurdish population in around Diyarbakır, farmers as well as Kurdish notables, also desisted. The influential Kurdish Cemilpasazade family even supported the Turkish Government. Also the ruler of Cizre, Sheikh Saida and the powerful Sheikh Ziyaettin from Norşin would not support the rebellion and preferred an arrangement with the Kemalists. Despite Sheikh Said's religious identity, there was no significant participation in the rebellion among Turkish Muslims. Sheikh Said's statement that "killing one Turk is better than killing seventy infidels" shows that the rebellion created a new type of radicalism by combining Islamist extremism and hostility towards Turks. This also explains why the rebellion was strong only in a few Kurdish-majority cities.

During this rebellion, the Turkish government used its airplanes for bombing raids in Palu-Bingöl area. In the course of this operation, the airfield near Elâzığ was used.

However, according to the British Air Ministry there are few reports on the use of Turkish airplanes in suppressing the Sheikh Said rebellion. The reports originate from the British Air Command at Mosul, which was in charge of intelligence for all of Iraq.

At the beginning of the rebellion the Turks had one squadron (filo) consisting of seven airplanes. Of these only 2 were serviceable. But In the course of the rebellion more than 70 aircraft have been involved in subduing the rebellion.

Turkey also obtained the permission to use the Baghdad Railway to transport their soldiers through Syria from France.

== The rebellion ==
Following the suppression of the Beytüşşebab rebellion, the Turkish government attempted to prevent an other rebellion. In February 1925, they moved into the Piran (today called Dicle) area to detain some Kurdish notables, but were prevented by men loyal to Sheikh Said. The intrusion by the Turkish army provoked Kurds around Sheikh Said, who reportedly killed or arrested all the Turkish military officers in the areas under their control. On 13 February 1925, Sheikh Said addressed the people in a sermon in the Piran mosque and stating:

"The madrasahs were closed. The Ministry of Religion and Foundations was abolished and the schools of religion were connected to the National Education. In the newspapers, a number of irreligious writers dare to insult the Prophet and extend the language of our Prophet. If I can do it today, I will start fighting myself and try to raise religion."

Sheikh Said was elected as the next commander of the Kurdish independence movement gathered around Azadî, and Darhini was declared the capital of Kurdistan on the 14 February 1925. Sheikh Said, who had taken the governor and the other officers captive while charging against Darhini (16 February), tried to bring the movement together in a single center with a declaration urging the people to rise up in the name of Islam. In this statement, he called on everyone to fight for the sake of religion, using his seal which declared its user to be 'the leader of the fighters for the sake of religion'. Initially, the rebellion was initiated on behalf of the Islamic Sharia, and only later converted to the Kurdish independence movement. The rebellion soon expanded and by 20 February, the town Lice, the headquarters of the 5th Army corps, was captured.

After receiving the support of the tribes of Mistan, Botan and Mhallami, he headed to Diyarbakır via Genç and Çapakçur (today known as Bingöl) and captured Maden, Siverek and Ergani. Another uprising, directed by Sheikh Abdullah attempted to capture Muş coming from Hınıs. But the rebels were defeated near Murat bridge and retreated. On 21 February, the government declared martial law in the eastern provinces. Army troops sent to fight Sheikh Said's insurgents forces on 23 February but were forced to retreat to Diyarbakir in the Winter Plain. The next day, another uprising under the leadership of Sheikh Sharif, who entered Elazığ, kept the city under his control for a short time. Elazığ was looted by rebels for several days. On the first of March, the Kurds managed to assault the Diyarbakır airport and destroy three airplanes.

One of the bigger engagements began on the night of 6–7 March, when Sheikh Said, with a force of 5,000–10,000 men, laid siege to the city of Diyarbakır where the headquarters of the Seventh Army Corps was located. Unfortunately for the rebellion neither the Kurdish notables nor the Kurdish farmers in the region in and around Diyarbakır were willing to support Sheikh Said. The Muslim revivalists attacked the city at all four gates simultaneously. All of their attacks were repelled by the numerically inferior Turkish garrison, using machine gun fire and mortar grenades. When the rebels retreated the next morning, the area around the city was full of dead bodies. When a second wave of attacks failed, the siege was finally lifted on 11 March. After a large consignment, a mass attack (26 March) and a suppression operation by the Turkish troops compelled many of the enemy troops to surrender. Insurgency leaders were squeezed while preparing to retreat to Iran in Boğlan (today known as Sohlan). Sheikh Sharif and some of the tribal leaders were captured in Palu, and on 15 April 1925, Sheikh Said was seized at Carpuh Bridge in Varto.

By the end of March, most of the major battles of the Sheikh Said rebellion were over. The Turkish authorities, according to Martin van Bruinessen, crushed the rebellion with continual aerial bombardments and a massive concentration of forces.

Hasan Hayri Efendi, who was Dersim Deputy and Alevi Zaza, joined Sheikh Sharif, and was appointed by Sheikh Said as Commander of the Elaziz Front. A joint letter with Sheikh Sharif in Elaziz was sent to all the tribal leaders of Dersim on 6 March 1925. But the rebels were unable to penetrate beyond Hınıs -- one of the two major areas where Sheikh Said was well known and enjoyed considerable influence (he had a tekke in Hınıs) -- preventing a wider rebellion.

=== Political measures by the Turkish Government ===
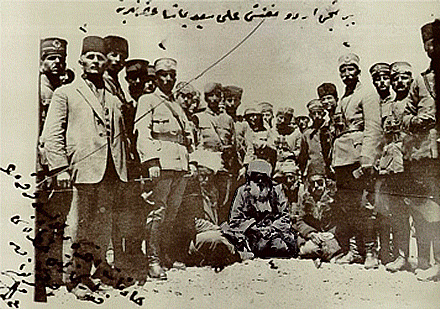
Turkish troops with the detained Sheik Said

Mustafa Kemal Atatürk foresaw the seriousness of the rebellion and urged İsmet İnönü, who had been resting on vacation at an island near Istanbul, to come to Ankara. Atatürk welcomed İnönü and his family at the Ankara Station and explained to him how serious the situation had become. Mustafa Kemal, Ali Fethi (Okyar) and İsmet İnönü met on the 24 February 1925, for 7 1/2 hours, mainly to discuss the rebellion. The following day, the government of Ali Fethi issued a circular vowing strict measures against the rebels. He announced the reign of martial law in the eastern provinces and classified the use of religious aims against the government as treason. The Turkish Parliament was not pleased with this action and in response, the Turkish prime minister Ali Fethi was criticized by the politicians of the Republican People's Party. However, Mustafa Kemal Pasha, advocated for the resignation of Prime Minister Ali Fethi against the rapid rise of the incidents and appointed İsmet Pasha to establish a new government on 2 March. Ali Fethi resigned on the 3 March and was replaced by Ismet Inönü. Within days, the Turkish Grand National Assembly adopted the Maintenance of Order Law (Turkish: Takrir-i Sükûn Kanunu) and granted the government emergency powers. The ban on the uprising has been extended to include other measures. In addition, it was decided to re-establish the Independence Courts in Ankara and Diyarbakır.

== Casualties ==
While casualty figures differ, most accounts agree that at least 5,000 people died during the suppression of the Sheikh Said rebellion, and the total may have been higher. Historian Robert Olson stressed that the heaviest impact on the Kurds came not from the death toll itself, but from the aftermath which included; widespread destruction of land and villages, mass deportations and the ongoing persecution carried out by Turkish officers, soldiers, and gendarmes. The killings continued for months after the rebellion. Kurdish villages in the vicinity of the rebellion were bombed, and thousands of people who were not related to the revolt directly were killed. Academic research suggests that around 25,000 Kurds were forced to flee the borders, with the French mandate of Syria being the recipient of the majority. They were all granted citizenship by the French mandate authorities.

According to contemporary Kurdish sources, civilian losses amounted to 206 villages destroyed, 8,758 houses burned, and 15,206 men, women, and children killed. These same sources claimed that the Kurds suffered 2,400 battle casualties, while Turkish forces suffered 50,000 casualties (killed and wounded).

=== Financial cost ===
Hamit Bozarslan estimates that about 35% of the budget went into the suppression of the revolt. The campaign is said to have cost the Turkish treasury 60 million Turkish pounds. The sum of 7 Mio. Turkish Pounds was reported by the US military attaché in Turkey.

== Trials and executions ==
Seyit Abdülkadir, the leader of the Kurdish Teali Society and several of his friends who were accused of supporting the rebellion, were arrested in Istanbul and taken to Diyarbakır to be tried. As a result of the trial, Seyit Abdulkadir and five of his friends were sentenced to death by the Independence Tribunal in Diyarbakır on 23 May 1925 and executed four days later. A journalist for a Kurdish newspaper in Bitlis, the poet Hizanizâde Kemal Fevzi, was also among the executed.

The Independence Tribunal in Diyarbakir also imposed a death sentence on Sheikh Said and 47 riots rulers on the 28 June 1925. Penalties were carried out the next day, by Sheikh Said coming up first. The President of the Independence Tribunal in Diyarbakır that sentenced the rebels stated on 28 June 1925:

Certain among you have taken as a pretext for revolt the abuse by the governmental administration, some others have invoked the defence of the Caliphate.

— 28 June 1925

In total over 7,000 people were prosecuted by the Independence tribunals and more than 600 people were executed. The suppression of the Shaykh Said Uprising was an important milestone in the control of the Republican administration in Eastern Anatolia and South East Anatolia. On the other hand, the developments that emerged with the uprising led to the interruption of the steps towards transition to multi-party life for a long while. Also against the Progressive Republican Party (Turkish: Terakkiperver Cumhuriyet Fırkası) was opened an investigation on the grounds that it was involved in the riot and was soon closed under a government decree.

After the uprising, the Turkish state prepared a Report for Reform in the East (Şark Islahat Raporu) in 1925, which suggested that the Kurds shall be Turkified.

In the fall of 1927, Sheikh Abdurrahman, the brother of Sheikh Said, began a series of revenge attacks on Turkish garrisons in Palu and Malatya. In August 1928 Sheikh Abdurrahman and another brother of Sheikh Said, Sheikh Mehdi, turned themselves in and made use of the amnesty law issued by the Turkish Government in May of the same year.

== Reception ==
In the Turkish press the suppression of the revolt was praised and according to Günther Deschner for quite some time also the western historians seemed to see the suppression as a pacification of a rebellious region. In Turkey it was assumed that the Sheikh Said revolt was supported by the British Empire who wanted to achieve certain concessions with regards to the Mosul dispute between Turkey and the British. The British on the other side assumed the Kemalists could have engineered the revolt, assuming that if the Kurdish revolt in Turkey was temporarily to succeed it would lead to a prolonged conflict over the Mosul Vilayet in Iraq with Turkey eventually able to occupy it. One of the early observers who criticized the way the Turkish Government treated the Kurdish people was the Indian Jawaharlal Nehru, who deemed the Kurds to have wanted to achieve something similar the Turks had achieved for themselves and questioned how a struggle for freedom could turn into an oppressive regime.

== See also ==
- Kurdish-Islamic synthesis

== Sources ==
- Olson, Robert W. (1989). The emergence of Kurdish nationalism and the Sheikh Said Rebellion, 1880-1925. University of Texas Press. ISBN 978-0-292-77619-7.
- Olson, Robert W. (March 2000). "The Kurdish Rebellions of Sheikh Said (1925), Mt. Ararat (1930), and Dersim (1937–8): Their Impact on the Development of the Turkish Air Force and on Kurdish and Turkish Nationalism". Die Welt des Islams. 40 (1): 67–94. doi:10.1163/1570060001569893.
