= Beytüşşebab rebellion =

Kurdish rebellion against the Turkish Government in 1924

- Part of Kurdish–Turkish conflict and Kurdish rebellions in Turkey
Date	August 1924
Location	Beytüşşebap District, Şırnak and Hakkari Province
Result	Turkish victory: Revolt suppressed

Belligerents
Kurdish rebels	Turkey

Commanders and leaders
Halid Beg Cibran; Ihsan Nuri Pasha; Yusuf Ziya Bey	Kemal Atatürk; İsmet Pasha; Kâzım Pasha

Units involved
Tribes of Beytussebab	Third Army

Strength
Unknown	Unknown

Casualties and losses
Unknown	Unknown

The Beytüşşebab rebellion (Turkish: Beytüşşebap isyanı; Kurdish: Serhildana Elkê) was the first Kurdish rebellion in the modern Republic of Turkey. The revolt was led by Halid Beg Cibran of the Cibran tribe. Other prominent commanders were Ihsan Nuri of the Celâlî tribe and Yusuf Ziya Bey. Its causes laid in opposition to the abolition of the Ottoman Caliphate by Atatürk on 3 March 1924, the repressive Turkish policies towards Kurdish identity, the prohibition of public use and teaching of the Kurdish language, the Turkification of the Kurdish regions, and the resettling of Kurdish landowners and tribal chiefs in the west of the country.

Numerous officers of the Turkish army deserted for the rebellion. The rebellion began in August 1924, when the garrison of Beytüşşebap, in southeastern Turkey, revolted against the Turkish government. The rebellion proved unsuccessful, and ended shortly after it began. Yusuf Ziya Bey was arrested on 10 October 1924 and reportedly accused Halid Beg Cibran of having been also involved in the revolt. Halid Beg Cibran was captured in Erzurum in December 1924. Both were courtmartialed in Bitlis. Although the rebellion was suppressed, another Kurdish uprising, the Sheikh Said rebellion, would begin the next year.
