= List of populated places in Ağrı Province =

List of places in Turkey

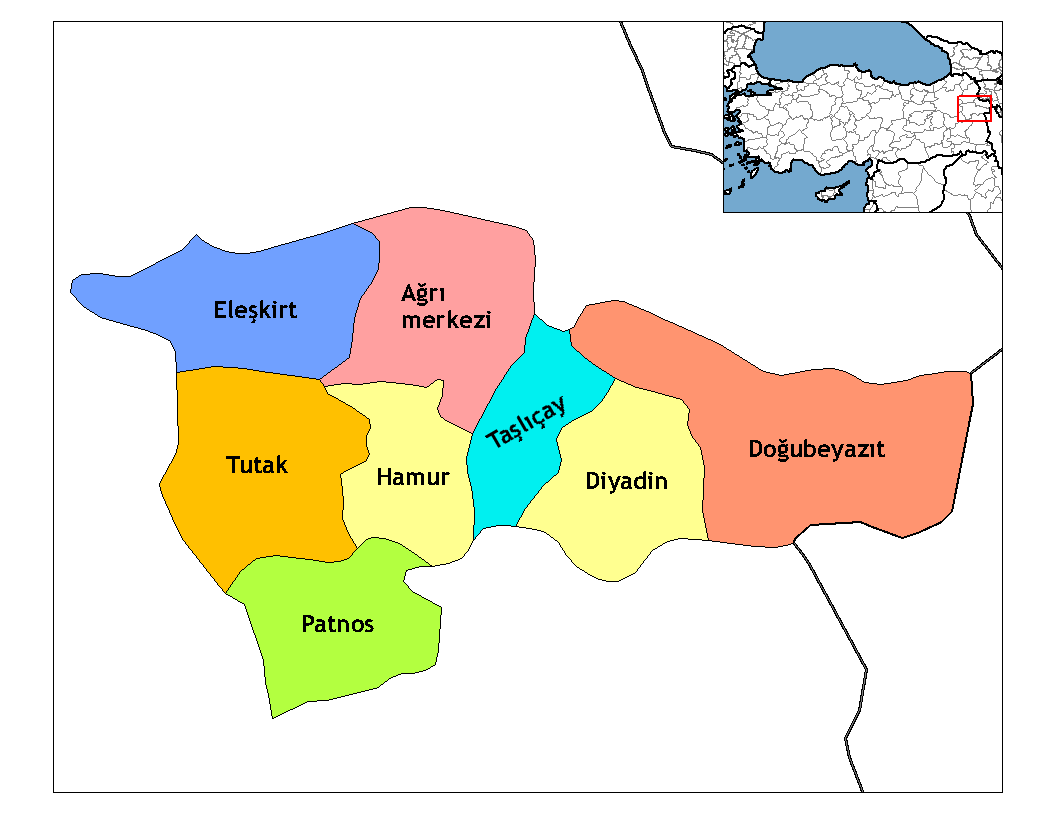

Below is the list of populated places in Ağrı Province, Turkey, by the districts. There are 8 districts connected to Ağrı, 4 towns and 567 villages connected to these districts.

== Ağrı ==
- Ağrı
- Ağılbaşı, Ağrı
- Ahmetbey, Ağrı
- Akbulgur, Ağrı
- Akçay, Ağrı
- Anakaya, Ağrı
- Arakonak, Ağrı
- Aslangazi, Ağrı
- Aşağı Pamuktaş, Ağrı
- Aşağıağadeve, Ağrı
- Aşağıdürmeli, Ağrı
- Aşağıkent, Ağrı
- Aşağısaklıca, Ağrı
- Aşağıyoldüzü, Ağrı
- Aşkale, Ağrı
- Badıllı, Ağrı
- Balıksu, Ağrı
- Balkaynak, Ağrı
- Ballıbostan, Ağrı
- Baloluk, Ağrı
- Başçavuş, Ağrı
- Başkent, Ağrı
- Beşbulak, Ağrı
- Beşiktepe, Ağrı
- Bezirhane, Ağrı
- Boztoprak, Ağrı
- Bölükbaşı, Ağrı
- Cumaçay, Ağrı
- Çakıroba, Ağrı
- Çamurlu, Ağrı
- Çatalipaşa, Ağrı
- Çayırköy, Ağrı
- Çobanbeyi, Ağrı
- Çukuralan, Ağrı
- Çukurçayır, Ağrı
- Dedemaksut, Ağrı
- Doğutepe, Ağrı
- Dönerdere, Ağrı
- Dumanlı, Ağrı
- Eğribelen, Ağrı
- Eliaçık, Ağrı
- Esenköy, Ağrı
- Eskiharman, Ağrı
- Geçitalan, Ağrı
- Gümüşyazı, Ağrı
- Güneysu, Ağrı
- Güvendik, Ağrı
- Güvenli, Ağrı
- Hacısefer, Ağrı
- Hanoba, Ağrı
- Hıdır, Ağrı
- Kalender, Ağrı
- Karasu, Ağrı
- Kavacık, Ağrı
- Kavakköy, Ağrı
- Kayabey, Ağrı
- Kazlı, Ağrı
- Kocataş, Ağrı
- Koçbaşı, Ağrı
- Konuktepe, Ağrı
- Kovancık, Ağrı
- Kumlugeçit, Ağrı
- Mollaali, Ağrı
- Mollaosman, Ağrı
- Murat, Ağrı
- Murathan, Ağrı
- Oğlaklı, Ağrı
- Ortakent, Ağrı
- Ortayokuş, Ağrı
- Otlubayır, Ağrı
- Ozanlar, Ağrı
- Özbaşı, Ağrı
- Özveren, Ağrı
- Sabuncu, Ağrı
- Sağırtaş, Ağrı
- Sarıca, Ağrı
- Sarıdoğan, Ağrı
- Sarıharman, Ağrı
- Sarıtaş, Ağrı
- Soğan Eleşkirt, Ağrı
- Soğancumaçay, Ağrı
- Söğütlü, Ağrı
- Suçatağı, Ağrı
- Taştekne, Ağrı
- Taypınar, Ağrı
- Tellisırt, Ağrı
- Tezeren, Ağrı
- Uçarkaya, Ağrı
- Uzunveli, Ağrı
- Yakınca, Ağrı
- Yalnızkonak, Ağrı
- Yaylaköy, Ağrı
- Yazıcı, Ağrı
- Yazılı, Ağrı
- Yığıntepe, Ağrı
- Yolluyazı, Ağrı
- Yolugüzel, Ağrı
- Yoncalı, Ağrı
- Yorgunsöğüt, Ağrı
- Yukarıdürmeli, Ağrı
- Yukarıküpkıran, Ağrı
- Yukarıpamuktaş, Ağrı
- Yukarısaklıca, Ağrı
- Yukarıyoldüzü, Ağrı
- Yurtpınar, Ağrı
- Ziyaret, Ağrı

== Diyadin ==
- Diyadin
- Akçevre, Diyadin
- Akyolaç, Diyadin
- Altınkilit, Diyadin
- Aşağıakpazar, Diyadin
- Aşağıdalören, Diyadin
- Aşağıkardeşli, Diyadin
- Aşağıtütek, Diyadin
- Atadamı, Diyadin
- Atayolu, Diyadin
- Batıbeyli, Diyadin
- Boyalan, Diyadin
- Budak, Diyadin
- Burgulu, Diyadin
- Büvetli, Diyadin
- Davutköy, Diyadin
- Dedebulak, Diyadin
- Delihasan, Diyadin
- Dibekli, Diyadin
- Dokuztaş, Diyadin
- Gedik, Diyadin
- Göğebakan, Diyadin
- Gözüpek, Diyadin
- Günbuldu, Diyadin
- Hacıhalit, Diyadin
- Heybeliyurt, Diyadin
- İsaağa, Diyadin
- Kapanca, Diyadin
- Karapazar, Diyadin
- Karataş, Diyadin
- Kocaçoban, Diyadin
- Kotancı, Diyadin
- Kuşburnu, Diyadin
- Kuşlu, Diyadin
- Mollakara, Diyadin
- Mutlu, Diyadin
- Oğuloba, Diyadin
- Omuzbaşı, Diyadin
- Pirali, Diyadin
- Rahmankulu, Diyadin
- Satıcılar, Diyadin
- Soğuksu, Diyadin
- Sürenkök, Diyadin
- Sürmelikoç, Diyadin
- Şahinşah, Diyadin
- Şekerbulak, Diyadin
- Taşbasamak, Diyadin
- Taşkesen, Diyadin
- Tazekent, Diyadin
- Toklucak, Diyadin
- Ulukent, Diyadin
- Uysallı, Diyadin
- Yanıkçukur, Diyadin
- Yeniçadır, Diyadin
- Yeşildurak, Diyadin
- Yıldırım, Diyadin
- Yıldız, Diyadin
- Yolcupınarı, Diyadin
- Yörükatlı, Diyadin
- Yukarıakpazar, Diyadin
- Yukarıdalören, Diyadin
- Yukarıtütek, Diyadin
- Yuva, Diyadin

== Eleşkirt ==
- Eleşkirt
- Abdiköy, Eleşkirt
- Akyumak, Eleşkirt
- Alagün, Eleşkirt
- Alkuşak, Eleşkirt
- Arifbey, Eleşkirt
- Aşağıcihanbey, Eleşkirt
- Aşağıkopuz, Eleşkirt
- Aydıntepe, Eleşkirt
- Aydoğdu, Eleşkirt
- Çatalpınar, Eleşkirt
- Çatkösedağ, Eleşkirt
- Çetinsu, Eleşkirt
- Çiftepınar, Eleşkirt
- Dalkılıç, Eleşkirt
- Değirmengeçidi, Eleşkirt
- Değirmenoluğu, Eleşkirt
- Dolutaş, Eleşkirt
- Düzağıl, Eleşkirt
- Düzyayla, Eleşkirt
- Ergözü, Eleşkirt
- Goncalı, Eleşkirt
- Gökçayır, Eleşkirt
- Gözaydın, Eleşkirt
- Güneykaya, Eleşkirt
- Güvence, Eleşkirt
- Hasanpınarı, Eleşkirt
- Haydaroğlu, Eleşkirt
- Hayrangöl, Eleşkirt
- İkizgeçe, Eleşkirt
- İkizgöl, Eleşkirt
- İndere, Eleşkirt
- Kanatgeren, Eleşkirt
- Karabacak, Eleşkirt
- Kayayolu, Eleşkirt
- Kokulupınar, Eleşkirt
- Köleköy, Eleşkirt
- Körpeçayır, Eleşkirt
- Mollahüseyin, Eleşkirt
- Mollasüleyman, Eleşkirt
- Oklavalı, Eleşkirt
- Öztoprak, Eleşkirt
- Palakçayırı, Eleşkirt
- Pirabat, Eleşkirt
- Ramazan, Eleşkirt
- Sadaklı, Eleşkirt
- Salkımlı, Eleşkirt
- Sarıköy, Eleşkirt
- Söbetaş, Eleşkirt
- Sultanabat, Eleşkirt
- Süzgeçli, Eleşkirt
- Toprakkale, Eleşkirt
- Türkeli, Eleşkirt
- Uludal, Eleşkirt
- Uzunyazı, Eleşkirt
- Yağmurlu, Eleşkirt
- Yanıkdere, Eleşkirt
- Yelkesen, Eleşkirt
- Yeşilova, Eleşkirt
- Yığıntaş, Eleşkirt
- Yukarıkopuz, Eleşkirt

== Hamur ==
- Hamur
- Abdiçıkmaz, Hamur
- Adımova, Hamur
- Alakoyun, Hamur
- Aşağıaladağ, Hamur
- Aşağıderedibi, Hamur
- Aşağıgözlüce, Hamur
- Aşağıkarabal, Hamur
- Aşağıyenigün, Hamur
- Ayvacık, Hamur
- Baldere, Hamur
- Beklemez, Hamur
- Ceylanlı, Hamur
- Çağlayan, Hamur
- Danakıran, Hamur
- Demirkapı, Hamur
- Ekincik, Hamur
- Erdoğan, Hamur
- Esenören, Hamur
- Gültepe, Hamur
- Gümüşkuşak, Hamur
- Kaçmaz, Hamur
- Kamışlı, Hamur
- Kandildağı, Hamur
- Karadoğu, Hamur
- Karakazan, Hamur
- Karaseyitali, Hamur
- Karlıca, Hamur
- Kaynaklı, Hamur
- Kılıç, Hamur
- Köşkköy, Hamur
- Nallıkonak, Hamur
- Özdirek, Hamur
- Sarıbuğday, Hamur
- Seslidoğan, Hamur
- Seyithanbey, Hamur
- Soğanlıtepe, Hamur
- Süleymankümbet, Hamur
- Tükenmez, Hamur
- Uğurtaş, Hamur
- Yapılı, Hamur
- Yoğunhisar, Hamur
- Yukarıağadeve, Hamur
- Yukarıaladağ, Hamur
- Yukarıgözlüce, Hamur
- Yukarıyenigün, Hamur
- Yuvacık, Hamur

== Patnos ==
- Patnos
- Akçaören, Patnos
- Akdilek, Patnos
- Aktepe, Patnos
- Akyemiş, Patnos
- Alatay, Patnos
- Andaçlı, Patnos
- Armutlu, Patnos
- Aşağıgöçmez, Patnos
- Aşağıkamışlı, Patnos
- Bağbaşı, Patnos
- Baltacık, Patnos
- Baştarla, Patnos
- Bozoğlak, Patnos
- Budak, Patnos
- Çakırbey, Patnos
- Çamurlu, Patnos
- Çaputlu, Patnos
- Çatmaoluk, Patnos
- Çavuşköy, Patnos
- Çiçek, Patnos
- Çimenli, Patnos
- Çukurbağ, Patnos
- Dağalan, Patnos
- Değirmendüzü, Patnos
- Demirören, Patnos
- Derecik, Patnos
- Dizginkale, Patnos
- Doğansu, Patnos
- Düzceli, Patnos
- Edremit, Patnos
- Ergeçli, Patnos
- Eryılmaz, Patnos
- Esenbel, Patnos
- Eskikonak, Patnos
- Gençali, Patnos
- Gökçeali, Patnos
- Gökoğlu, Patnos
- Gönlüaçık, Patnos
- Güllüce, Patnos
- Günbeli, Patnos
- Gündüz, Patnos
- Güvercinli, Patnos
- Hacılar, Patnos
- Hasandolu, Patnos
- Hisarköy, Patnos
- Karatoklu, Patnos
- Karbasan, Patnos
- Kaş, Patnos
- Kazanbey, Patnos
- Keçelbaba, Patnos
- Kızıltepe, Patnos
- Kızkapan, Patnos
- Koçaklar, Patnos
- Konakbeyi, Patnos
- Köseler, Patnos
- Kucak, Patnos
- Kuruyaka, Patnos
- Kuşkaya, Patnos
- Kürekli, Patnos
- Meydandağı, Patnos
- Mollaibrahim, Patnos
- Onbaşılar, Patnos
- Ortadamla, Patnos
- Oyacık, Patnos
- Örendik, Patnos
- Özdemir, Patnos
- Pirömer, Patnos
- Sağrıca, Patnos
- Sarıdibek, Patnos
- Suluca, Patnos
- Susuz, Patnos
- Tanyeli, Patnos
- Taşkın, Patnos
- Tepeli, Patnos
- Usluca, Patnos
- Uzunca, Patnos
- Uzungün, Patnos
- Üçoymak, Patnos
- Ürküt, Patnos
- Yalçınkaya, Patnos
- Yeşilhisar, Patnos
- Yeşilyurt, Patnos
- Yukarıdamla, Patnos
- Yukarıgöçmez, Patnos
- Yukarıkamışlı
- Yukarıkülecik, Patnos
- Yurtöven, Patnos
- Yüncüler, Patnos
- Yürekveren, Patnos
- Zincirkale, Patnos
- Zirekli, Patnos
- Ziyaret, Patnos

== Taşlıçay ==
- Taşlıçay
- Alakoçlu, Taşlıça
- Aras, Taşlıçay
- Aşağıdumanlı, Taşlıçay
- Aşağıdüzmeydan, Taşlıçay
- Aşağıesen, Taşlıçay
- Aşağıtoklu, Taşlıçay
- Balçiçek, Taşlıçay
- Bayıraltı, Taşlıçay
- Bayramyazı, Taşlıçay
- Boyuncak, Taşlıçay
- Çöğürlü, Taşlıçay
- Çökelge, Taşlıçay
- Dilekyazı, Taşlıçay
- Düzgören, Taşlıçay
- Geçitveren, Taşlıçay
- Gözucu, Taşlıçay
- Gündoğdu, Taşlıçay
- Güneysöğüt, Taşlıçay
- İkiyamaç, Taşlıçay
- Kağnılı, Taşlıçay
- Karagöz, Taşlıçay
- Kumlubucak, Taşlıçay
- Kumluca, Taşlıçay
- Samanyolu, Taşlıçay
- Tanrıverdi, Taşlıçay
- Tanyolu, Taşlıçay
- Taşteker, Taşlıçay
- Yanalyol, Taşlıçay
- Yankaya, Taşlıçay
- Yardımcılar, Taşlıçay
- Yassıkaya, Taşlıçay
- Yeltepe, Taşlıçay
- Yukarıdumanlı, Taşlıçay
- Yukarıdüzmeydan, Taşlıçay
- Yukarıesen, Taşlıçay
- Yukarıtaşlıçay, Taşlıçay
- Yukarıtoklu, Taşlıçay

== Tutak ==
- Tutak
- Adakent, Tutak
- Ahmetabat, Tutak
- Akyele, Tutak
- Alacahan, Tutak
- Aşağıkarahalit, Tutak
- Aşağıkargalık, Tutak
- Aşağıköşkköy, Tutak
- Aşağıkülecik, Tutak
- Aşağıözdek, Tutak
- Atabindi, Tutak
- Ataköy, Tutak
- Azizler, Tutak
- Bahçeköy, Tutak
- Batmış, Tutak
- Bayındır, Tutak
- Beydamarlı, Tutak
- Bintosun, Tutak
- Bişi, Tutak
- Bolaşlı, Tutak
- Bozkaş, Tutak
- Bulutpınar, Tutak
- Burnubulak, Tutak
- Çelebaşı, Tutak
- Çırpılı, Tutak
- Çobanoba, Tutak
- Çukurkonak, Tutak
- Dağlıca, Tutak
- Daldalık, Tutak
- Damlakaya, Tutak
- Dayıpınarı, Tutak
- Dereköy, Tutak
- Dibelek, Tutak
- Dikbıyık, Tutak
- Dikme, Tutak
- Doğangün, Tutak
- Dorukdibi, Tutak
- Dönertaş, Tutak
- Döşkaya, Tutak
- Ekincek, Tutak
- Erdal, Tutak
- Ergeçidi, Tutak
- Esmer, Tutak
- Geçimli, Tutak
- Gültepe, Tutak
- Güneşgören, Tutak
- Hacıyusuf, Tutak
- İkigözüm, Tutak
- İpekkuşak, Tutak
- İsaabat, Tutak
- Karaağaç, Tutak
- Karacan, Tutak
- Karahan, Tutak
- Karakuyu, Tutak
- Kaşönü, Tutak
- Kesik, Tutak
- Kılıçgediği, Tutak
- Mızrak, Tutak
- Mollahasan, Tutak
- Ocakbaşı, Tutak
- Oğlaksuyu, Tutak
- Ortayamaç, Tutak
- Otluca, Tutak
- Ozanpınar, Tutak
- Öndül, Tutak
- Palandöken, Tutak
- Sarıgöze, Tutak
- Sincan, Tutak
- Soğukpınar, Tutak
- Sorguçlu, Tutak
- Suvar, Tutak
- Şekerbulak, Tutak
- Taşbudak, Tutak
- Uzunöz, Tutak
- Yayıklı, Tutak
- Yenikent, Tutak
- Yeniköy, Tutak
- Yukarıkarahalit, Tutak
- Yukarıkargalık, Tutak
- Yukarıköşk, Tutak
- Yukarıözdek, Tutak
