= List of municipalities in Ağrı Province =

This is a list of the municipalities in Ağrı Province, Turkey as of January 2023.

District	Municipality
Ağrı	Ağrı
Diyadin	Diyadin
Doğubayazıt	Doğubayazıt
Eleşkirt	Eleşkirt
Eleşkirt	Tahir
Eleşkirt	Yayladüzü
Eleşkirt	Yücekapı
Hamur	Hamur
Patnos	Patnos
Patnos	Dedeli
Taşlıçay	Taşlıçay
Tutak	Tutak
