= Diyadin (disambiguation) =

Diyadin is a town of Ağrı Province of Turkey. Diyadin may also refer to:

- Diyadin District, a district of Ağrı Province, Turkey
- Diyadin, Azerbaijan, village in Azerbaijan
- Metin Diyadin, Turkish football manager
