= Balçiçek, Taşlıçay =

Balçiçek
- Village
- Location in Turkey
- Coordinates: 39°41′27″N 43°20′51″E
- Country: Turkey
- Province: Ağrı
- District: Taşlıçay
- Elevation: 2,044 m (6,706 ft)
- Population (2023): 140
- Time zone: UTC+3 (TRT)
- Postal code: 04802
- Area code: 0472

Balçiçek is a village in the Taşlıçay District of Ağrı Province, Turkey. The village is located 37 km from the provincial capital of Ağrı and 9 km from the district center of Taşlıçay.

== History ==
The village's former name was recorded as Abdalaği in 1912 and as Abdelik or Abdalik in 1928, with the Kurmanji term "avdêlik" meaning "abdalcık". Previously part of the Diyadin district, Balçiçek was attached to the Karaköse district on May 16, 1934. It later became part of Taşlıçay when it was established as a district.

== Population ==
Historical population
Year	Pop.	±% p.a.
1965	232	—
1985	277	+0.89%
1990	244	−2.51%
1997	180	−4.25%
2007	168	−0.69%
2012	160	−0.97%
2017	153	−0.89%
2023	140	−1.47%
Source: Population censuses (1965-1997) and TÜİK (2007-2023)
