= Kotancı, Diyadin =

Kotancı
- Village
- Location in Turkey
- Coordinates: 39°24′27″N 43°32′21″E
- Country: Turkey
- Province: Ağrı
- District: Diyadin
- Elevation: 2,300 m (7,500 ft)
- Population (2023): 137
- Time zone: UTC+3 (TRT)
- Postal code: 04902
- Area code: 0472

Kotancı is a village in the Diyadin District of Ağrı Province, Turkey.

== History ==
Kotancı has been known by its current name since 1928. The village was previously part of Eleşkirt district before being transferred to Diyadin.

== Geography ==
The village is located 90 km from the city center of Ağrı and 30 km from the district center of Diyadin.

== Population ==
Historical population
Year	Pop.	±% p.a.
1965	212	—
1985	236	+0.54%
1990	242	+0.50%
1997	221	−1.29%
2007	212	−0.41%
2012	199	−1.26%
2017	163	−3.91%
2023	137	−2.85%
Source: Population censuses (1965-1997) and TÜİK (2007-2023)
