= Lake Atar =

Lake in Turkey

- Location within Turkey
- Location: Yeltepe Village, Taşlıçay, Ağrı Province
- Coordinates: 39.4045362°N 43.3852336°E
- Basin countries: Turkey
- Surface elevation: 2.850 m (9 ft 4.2 in)

Lake Atar (Turkish: Atar Gölü); is a lake in the Taşlıçay district of Ağrı province. It is one of the highest lakes in Turkey.

== Geology and geography ==
It is located on the outskirts of Koçbaşı Hill, the highest peak of Aladağ Mountains, located within the borders of Taşlıçay, close to the Erciş border, which is 72 km from the center of Ağrı and 38 km from Taşlıçay center. The depth of the lake is not yet known.
