= Taşlıçay District =

District of Ağrı Province, Turkey

- District
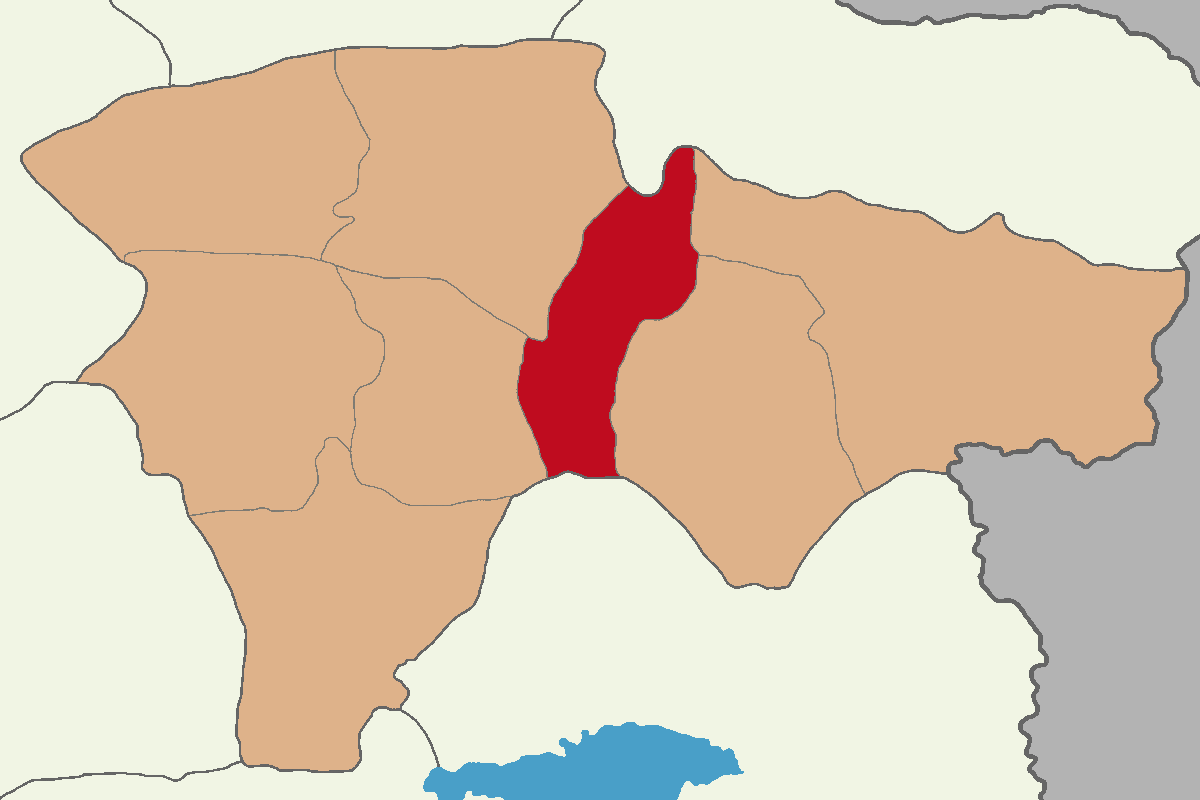
- Map showing Taşlıçay District in Ağrı Province

- Location in Turkey
- Coordinates: 39°38′N 43°23′E
- Country: Turkey
- Province: Ağrı
- Seat: Taşlıçay

Government
  - Kaymakam: Adem Topaca
- Area: 822 km^{2} (317 sq mi)
- Population (2021): 19,321
  - Density: 23.5/km^{2} (60.9/sq mi)
- Time zone: UTC+3 (TRT)
- Website: www.taslicay.gov.tr

Taşlıçay District is a district of Ağrı Province of Turkey. Its seat is the town Taşlıçay. Its area is 822 km^{2}, and its population is 19,321 (2021).

== Geography ==
Lake Atar is located 38 km from the center of Taşlıçay and close to the Erciş border.

== Composition ==
There is one municipality in Taşlıçay District:

- Taşlıçay

There are 37 villages in Taşlıçay District:

- Alakoçlu
- Aras
- Aşağıdumanlı
- Aşağıdüzmeydan
- Aşağıesen
- Aşağıtoklu
- Balçiçek
- Bayıraltı
- Bayramyazı
- Boyuncak
- Çöğürlü
- Çökelge
- Dilekyazı
- Düzgören
- Geçitveren
- Gözucu
- Gündoğdu
- Güneysöğüt
- Ikiyamaç
- Kağnılı
- Karagöz
- Kumlubucak
- Kumluca
- Samanyolu
- Tanrıverdi
- Tanyolu
- Taşteker
- Yanalyol
- Yankaya
- Yardımcılar
- Yassıkaya
- Yeltepe
- Yukarıdumanlı
- Yukarıdüzmeydan
- Yukarıesen
- Yukarıtaşlıçay
- Yukarıtoklu
