= Seyithanbey, Hamur =

Seyithanbey
- Village
- Location in Turkey
- Coordinates: 39°33′07″N 43°06′32″E
- Country: Turkey
- Province: Ağrı
- District: Hamur
- Elevation: 1,856 m (6,089 ft)
- Population (2023): 549
- Time zone: UTC+3 (TRT)
- Postal code: 04852
- Area code: 0472

Seyithanbey is a village in the Hamur District of Ağrı Province, Turkey.

== History ==
The village was formerly known as Seyidhanbeğ in records from the year 1928.

== Geography ==
The village is located 28 km from Ağrı city center and 16 km from the district center of Hamur.

== Population ==
Historical population
Year	Pop.	±% p.a.
1965	421	—
1985	648	+2.18%
1990	686	+1.15%
1997	729	+0.87%
2007	735	+0.08%
2012	677	−1.63%
2017	650	−0.81%
2023	549	−2.78%
Source: Population censuses (1965-1997) and TÜİK (2007-2023)
