= Eleşkirt District =

- District
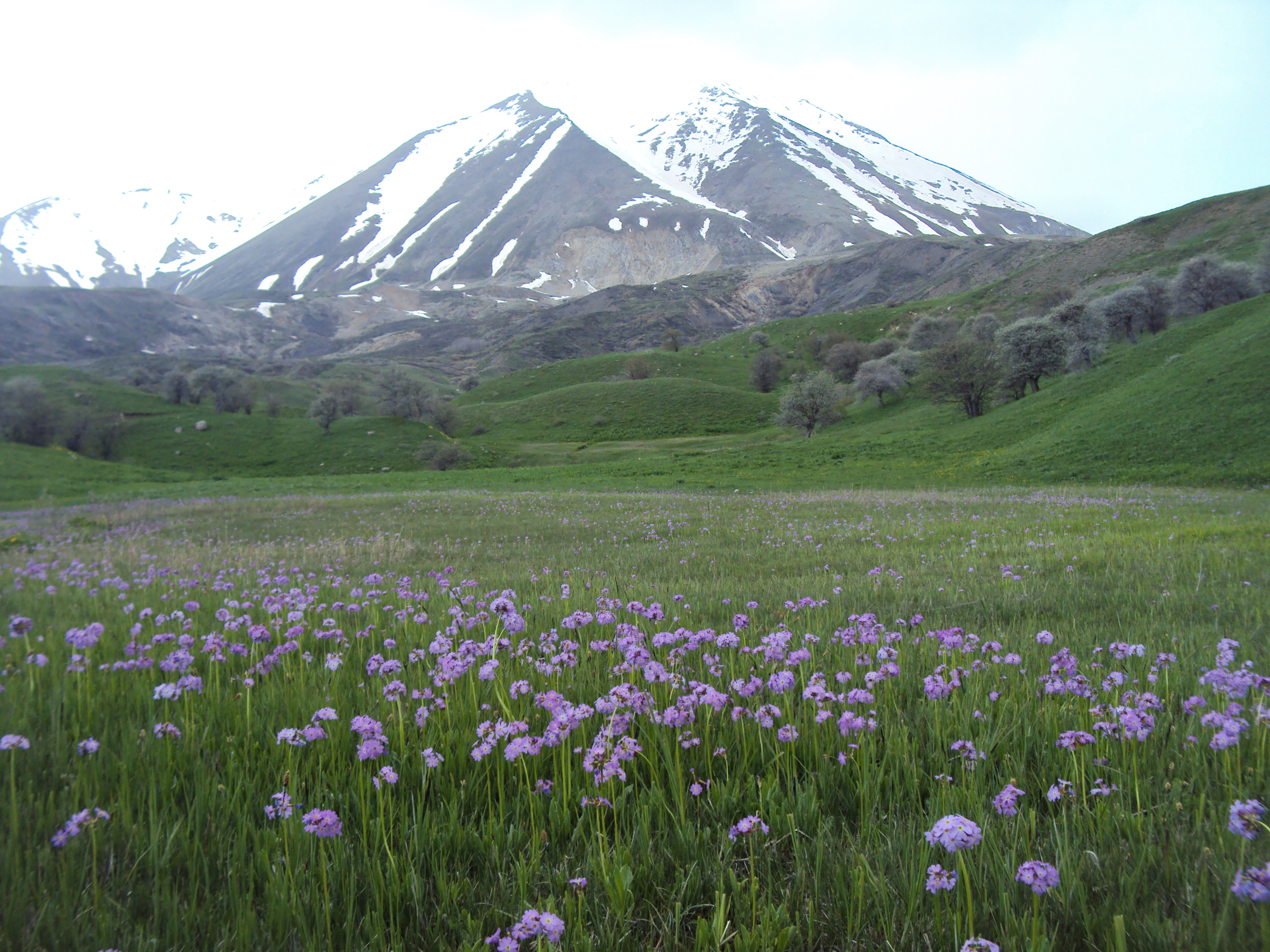
- Mt. Kösedağ, Eleşkirt

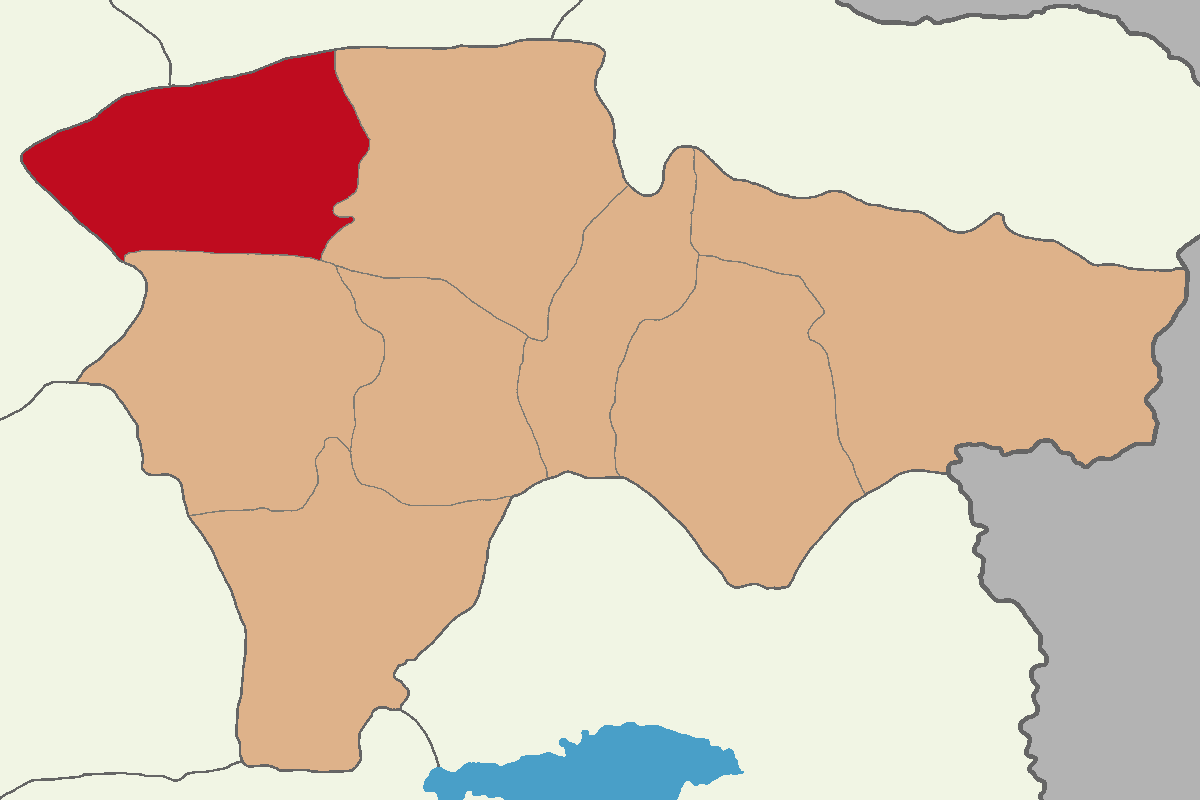
- Map showing Eleşkirt District in Ağrı Province

- Location within Turkey
- Coordinates: 39°48′N 42°40′E
- Country: Turkey
- Province: Ağrı
- Seat: Eleşkirt
- Area: 1,307 km^{2} (505 sq mi)
- Population (2021): 31,545
  - Density: 24.14/km^{2} (62.51/sq mi)
- Time zone: UTC+3 (TRT)
- Website: www.eleskirt.gov.tr

Eleşkirt District is a district of Ağrı Province of Turkey. Its seat is the town Eleşkirt. Its area is 1,307 km^{2}, and its population is 31,545 (2021).

== Geology and geomorphology ==
There is Mount Kösedağ in the north of Eleşkirt district center.

== Composition ==
There are four municipalities in Eleşkirt District:

- Eleşkirt
- Tahir
- Yayladüzü
- Yücekapı

There are 55 villages in Eleşkirt District:

- Abdiköy
- Akyumak
- Alagün
- Alkuşak
- Arifbey
- Aşağıkopuz
- Aydoğdu
- Çatalpınar
- Çatkösedağ
- Çetinsu
- Çiftepınar
- Dalkılıç
- Değirmenoluğu
- Dolutaş
- Düzağıl
- Düzyayla
- Ergözü
- Goncalı
- Gözaydın
- Güneykaya
- Güvence
- Hasanpınarı
- Haydaroğlu
- Hayrangöl
- Hürriyet
- Ikizgeçe
- Ikizgöl
- Indere
- Kanatgeren
- Karabacak
- Kayayolu
- Kokulupınar
- Körpeçayır
- Mollahüseyin
- Mollasüleyman
- Öztoprak
- Palakçayırı
- Pirabat
- Ramazan
- Sadaklı
- Salkımlı
- Sarıköy
- Söbetaş
- Sultanabat
- Süzgeçli
- Toprakkale
- Türkeli
- Uludal
- Uzunyazı
- Yağmurlu
- Yanıkdere
- Yelkesen
- Yeşilova
- Yığıntaş
- Yukarıkopuz
