= Lake Balık =

Lake Balık Balık Gölü
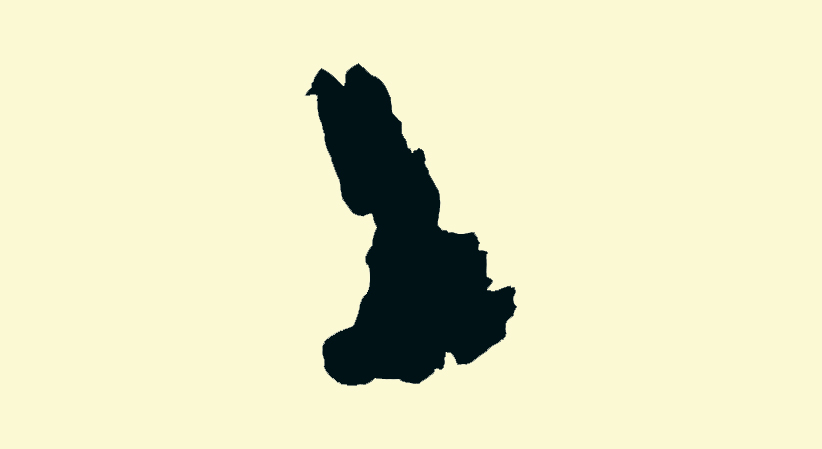
- Map of the lake

- Location of Lake Balık in Turkey.
- Location: Taşlıçay-Doğubeyazıt, Ağrı Province, Turkey
- Coordinates: 39°45′N 43°34′E
- Type: Lava-dammed freshwater lake
- Primary outflows: Gürgüre Creek
- Basin countries: Turkey
- Surface area: 34 km^{2} (13 sq mi)
- Max. depth: 37 m (121 ft)
- Surface elevation: 2,250 m (7,380 ft)
- Islands: 1

Lake Balık (Turkish: Balık Gölü, literally "fish lake", Kurdish: Gola Masiyan), is a lava-dammed freshwater lake in Ağrı Province, eastern Turkey. It has one of the highest elevations of the country's lakes.

== Geography ==
The lake is situated on the district border of Taşlıçay and Doğubeyazıt in Ağrı Province. The west shore of the lake lies in Taşlıçay and the east shore in Doğubeyazıt. Its distance to Taşlıçay town is 26 km (16 mi) while to Doğubeyazıt town is 60 km (37 mi). It is 60 km (37 mi) far from Ağrı. Formed by a lava dam, the geology and geomorphology of the lake feature characteristics of ophiolite and sedimentary rocks. It is situated in the Aras Mountains at an elevation of about 2,250 m (7,380 ft) with respect to mean sea level, making it one of the highest lakes in Turkey. The average area of its surface is 34 km^{2} (13 sq mi). The maximum depth is 37 metres (121 ft). The lake is fed by a number of creeks from the surrounding mountains and groundwater, and in turn it feeds Gürgüre Creek to the southeast. The lake lies in an area with a continental climate. Winters are harsh, and the seasons of spring and fall are short. Precipitation is mostly in the form of snow rather than rain. In the wintertime, the lake freezes and is covered with ice of thickness up to 20 cm (7.9 in).

== Biota ==
Particularly the southeast of the wetland is covered with reeds. There is agricultural land and meadows in close surroundings of the lake. The fauna of the lake is composed of diverse bird species. An island of size 0.15 ha (0.37 acres) in the lake is the nesting area of velvet duck. The lake is also a waterfowl habitat of national importance, however, it is not under protection. The trout in the lake is consumed as food and also as a medicine. Observed wildlife in the area around the lake are the bird species eagle, hawk, partridge, wild duck, seagull, quail, woodcock and the mammals hare, fox, and wolf.
