= Yanıkdere, Eleşkirt =

Yanıkdere
- Village
- Location in Turkey
- Coordinates: 39°46′36″N 42°54′13″E
- Country: Turkey
- Province: Ağrı
- District: Eleşkirt
- Elevation: 1,661 m (5,449 ft)
- Population (2022): 316
- Time zone: UTC+3 (TRT)
- Postal code: 04602
- Area code: 0472

Yanıkdere is a village in the Eleşkirt District of Ağrı Province, Turkey.

== History ==
The village has been known as Kırkan since 1928, a name which is also referred to as "qiriqa" in Kurmanji.

== Geography ==
The village is located 12 km from the city center of Ağrı and 22 km from the district center of Eleşkirt.

== Population ==
Historical population
Year	Pop.	±% p.a.
1965	310	—
1985	449	+1.87%
1990	337	−5.58%
1997	321	−0.69%
2007	400	+2.22%
2012	388	−0.61%
2017	361	−1.43%
2023	304	−2.82%
Source: Population censuses (1965-1997) and TÜİK (2007-2023)
