= Tutak District =

District of Ağrı Province, Turkey

- District
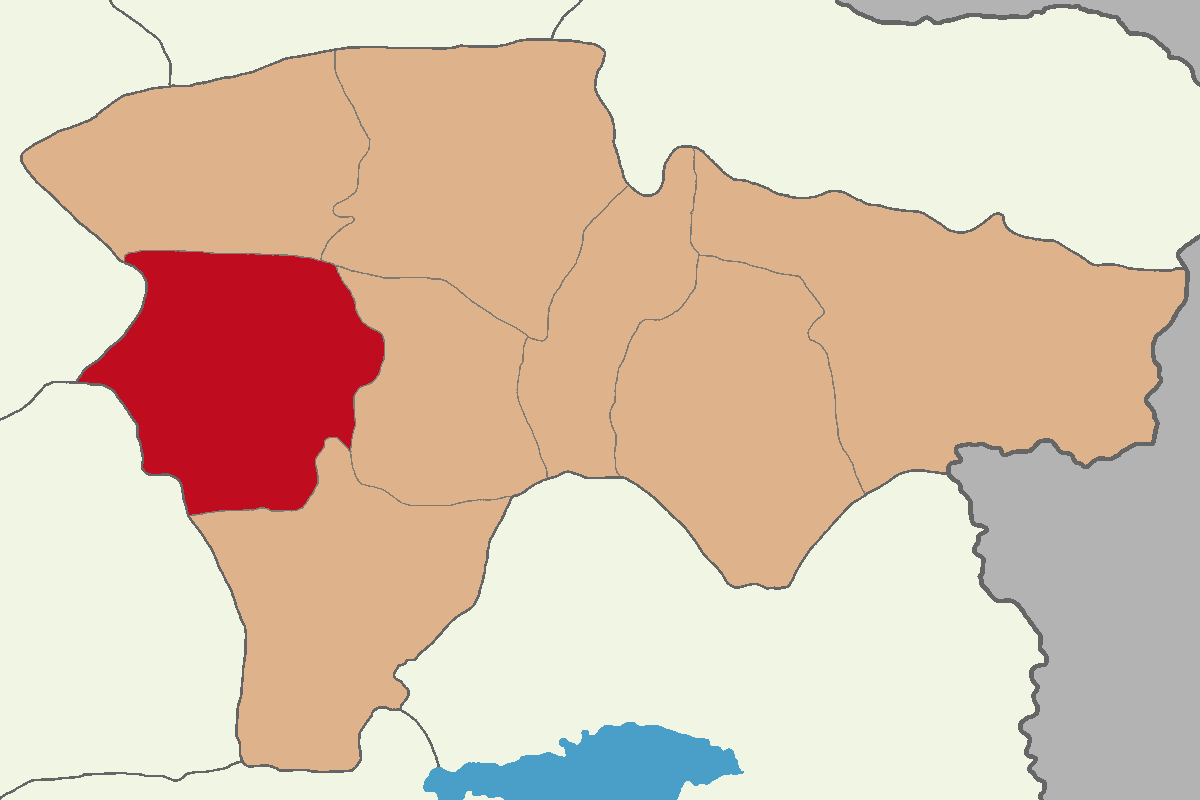
- Map showing Tutak District in Ağrı Province

- Location in Turkey
- Coordinates: 39°33′N 42°46′E
- Country: Turkey
- Province: Ağrı
- Seat: Tutak

Government
  - Kaymakam: Enis Aslantatar
- Area: 1,407 km^{2} (543 sq mi)
- Population (2021): 28,927
  - Density: 20.56/km^{2} (53.25/sq mi)
- Time zone: UTC+3 (TRT)
- Website: www.tutak.gov.tr

Tutak District is a district of Ağrı Province of Turkey. Its seat is the town Tutak. Its area is 1,407 km^{2}, and its population is 28,927 (2021).

== Composition ==
There is one municipality in Tutak District:

- Tutak

There are 80 villages in Tutak District:

- Adakent
- Ahmetabat
- Akyele
- Alacahan
- Aşağıkarahalit
- Aşağıkargalık
- Aşağıköşkköy
- Aşağıkülecik
- Aşağıözdek
- Atabindi
- Ataköy
- Azizler
- Bahçeköy
- Batmış
- Bayındır
- Beydamarlı
- Bintosun
- Bişi
- Bolaşlı
- Bozkaş
- Bulutpınar
- Burnubulak
- Çelebaşı
- Çırpılı
- Çobanoba
- Çukurkonak
- Dağlıca
- Daldalık
- Damlakaya
- Dayıpınarı
- Dereköy
- Dibelek
- Dikbıyık
- Dikme
- Doğangün
- Dorukdibi
- Dönertaş
- Döşkaya
- Ekincek
- Erdal
- Ergeçidi
- Esmer
- Geçimli
- Gültepe
- Güneşgören
- Hacıyusuf
- İkigözüm
- İpekkuşak
- İsaabat
- Karaağaç
- Karacan
- Karahan
- Karakuyu
- Kaşönü
- Kesik
- Kılıçgediği
- Mızrak
- Mollahasan
- Ocakbaşı
- Oğlaksuyu
- Ortayamaç
- Otluca
- Ozanpınar
- Öndül
- Palandöken
- Sarıgöze
- Sincan
- Soğukpınar
- Sorguçlu
- Suvar
- Şekerbulak
- Taşbudak
- Uzunöz
- Yayıklı
- Yenikent
- Yeniköy
- Yukarıkarahalit
- Yukarıkargalık
- Yukarıköşk
- Yukarıözdek
