= Otluca, Tutak =

Otluca
- Village
- Location in Turkey
- Coordinates: 39°35′32″N 42°52′52″E
- Country: Turkey
- Province: Ağrı
- District: Tutak
- Elevation: 1,788 m (5,866 ft)
- Population (2023): 216
- Time zone: UTC+3 (TRT)
- Postal code: 04702
- Area code: 0472

Otluca is a village in the Tutak District of Ağrı Province, Turkey. The village is located 52 km from Ağrı city center and 12 km from the district center of Tutak.

== History ==
The village was formerly known as Geri or Keri according to records from 1912.

== Population ==
Historical population
Year	Pop.	±% p.a.
1965	129	—
1985	154	+0.89%
1990	185	+3.74%
1997	187	+0.15%
2007	187	+0.00%
2012	190	+0.32%
2017	219	+2.88%
2023	216	−0.23%
Source: Population censuses (1965-1997) and TÜİK (2007-2023)
