= Hamur District =

District of Ağrı Province, Turkey

- District
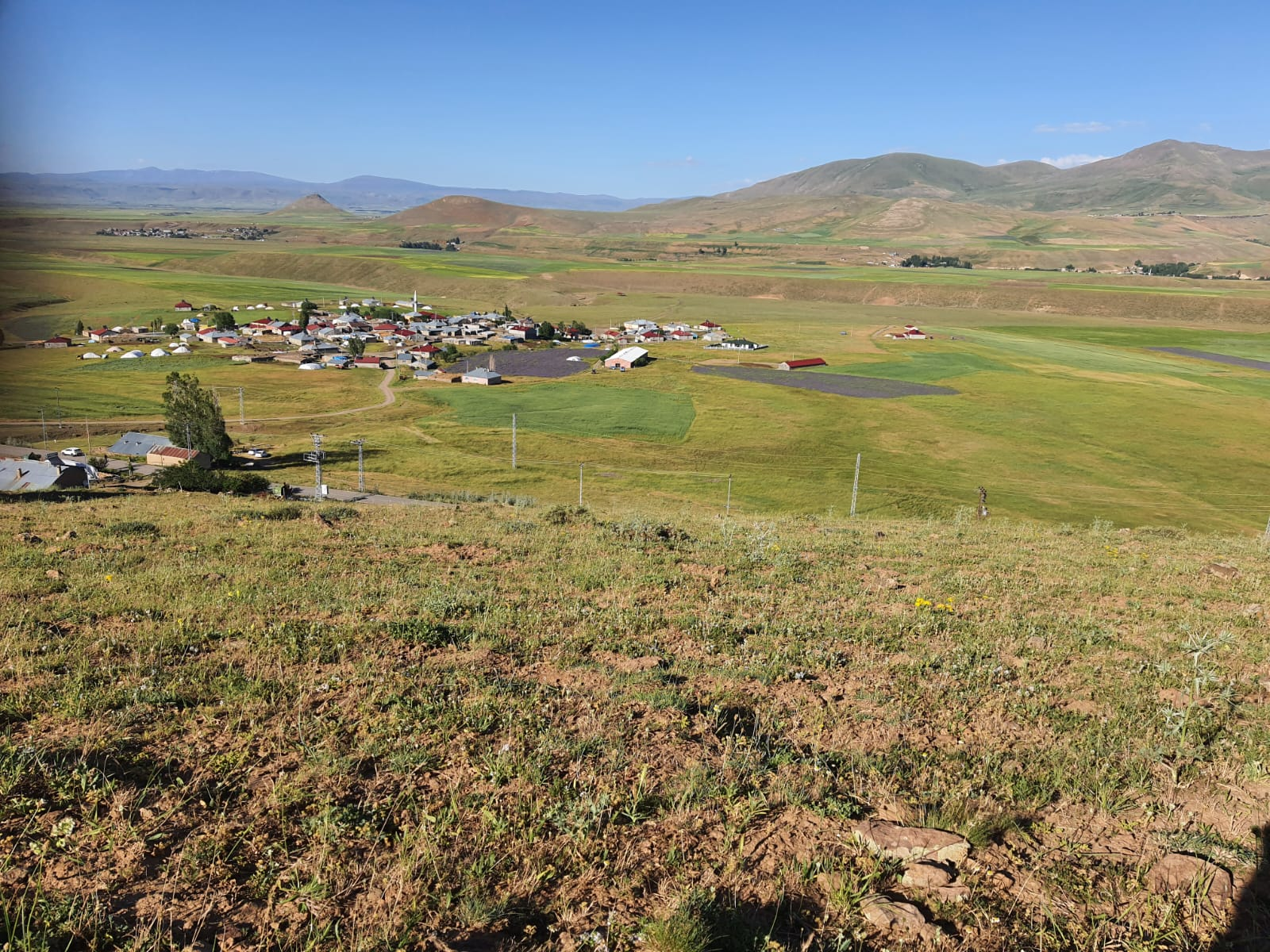
- Ekincik village, Hamur

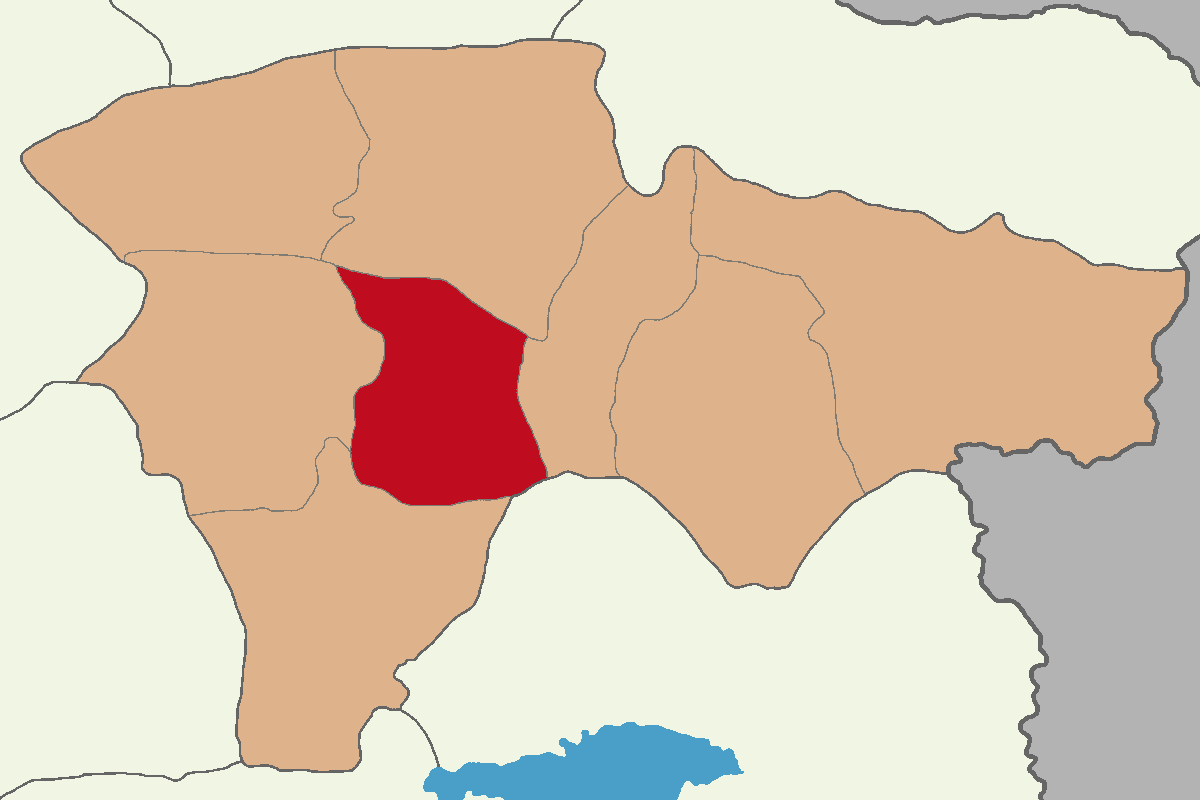
- Map showing Hamur District in Ağrı Province

- Location within Turkey
- Coordinates: 39°37′N 43°00′E
- Country: Turkey
- Province: Ağrı
- Seat: Hamur

Government
  - Kaymakam: Ali Yıldırım
- Area: 873 km^{2} (337 sq mi)
- Population (2021): 17,106
  - Density: 19.6/km^{2} (50.7/sq mi)
- Time zone: UTC+3 (TRT)
- Website: www.hamur.gov.tr

Hamur District is a district of Ağrı Province of Turkey. Its seat is the town Hamur. Its area is 873 km^{2}, and its population is 17,106 (2021).

== Composition ==
There is one municipality in Hamur District:

- Hamur

There are 46 villages in Hamur District:

- Abdiçıkmaz
- Adımova
- Akyurt
- Alakoyun
- Aşağıaladağ
- Aşağıderedibi
- Aşağıgözlüce
- Aşağıkarabal
- Aşağıyenigün
- Ayvacık
- Baldere
- Beklemez
- Ceylanlı
- Çağlayan
- Danakıran
- Demirkapı
- Ekincik
- Erdoğan
- Esenören
- Gültepe
- Gümüşkuşak
- Kaçmaz
- Kamışlı
- Kandildağı
- Karadoğu
- Karakazan
- Karaseyitali
- Karlıca
- Kaynaklı
- Kılıç
- Köşkköy
- Nallıkonak
- Özdirek
- Sarıbuğday
- Seslidoğan
- Seyithanbey
- Soğanlıtepe
- Süleymankümbet
- Tükenmez
- Uğurtaş
- Yapılı
- Yoğunhisar
- Yukarıaladağ
- Yukarıgözlüce
- Yukarıyenigün
- Yuvacık
