= Tahir, Eleşkirt =

Tahir
- Municipality
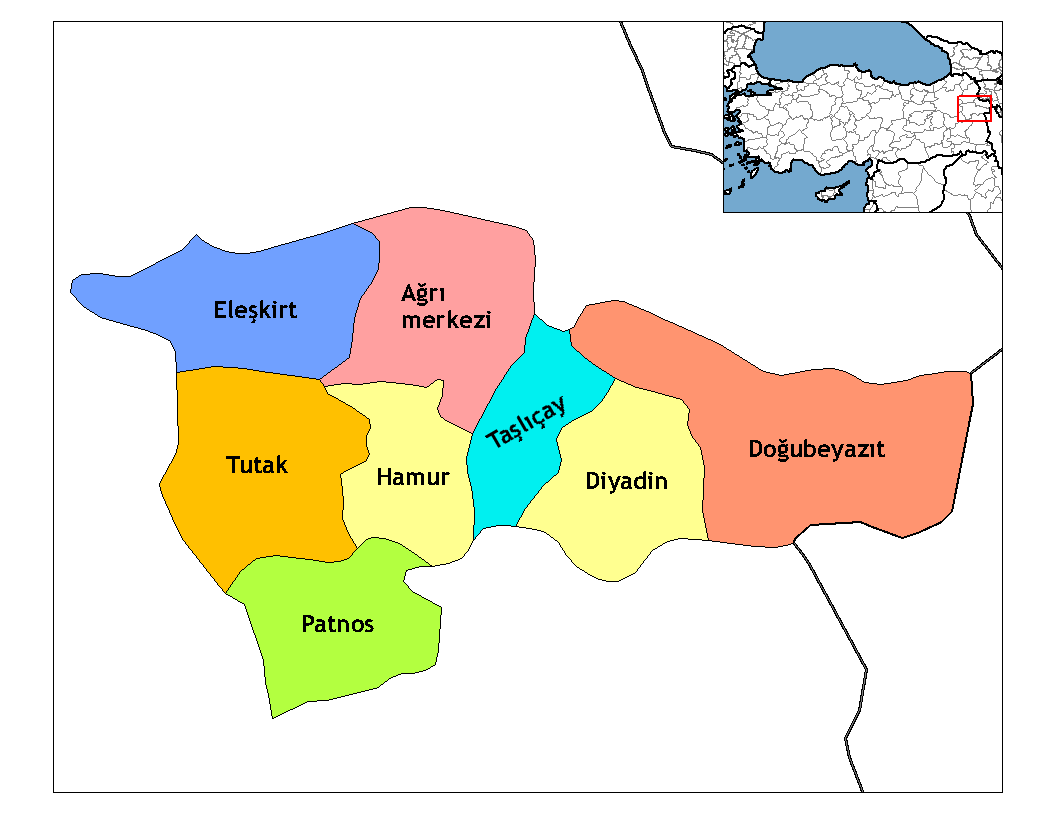

- Location within Turkey
- Coordinates: 39°52′N 42°26′E
- Country: Turkey
- Province: Ağrı
- District: Eleşkirt
- Population (2021): 1,427
- Time zone: UTC+3 (TRT)

Tahir is a town (belde) and municipality in the Eleşkirt District, Ağrı Province, Turkey. Its population is 1,427 (2021).
