= Yayladüzü =

- Municipality
- Location in Turkey
- Coordinates: 39°49′N 42°18′E
- Country: Turkey
- Province: Ağrı
- District: Eleşkirt
- Population (2021): 1,792
- Time zone: UTC+3 (TRT)

Yayladüzü is a town (belde) and municipality in the Eleşkirt District, Ağrı Province, Turkey. Its population is 1,792 (2021).
