= Yücekapı =

- Municipality
- Location in Turkey
- Coordinates: 39°45′N 42°44′E
- Country: Turkey
- Province: Ağrı
- District: Eleşkirt
- Population (2021): 2,200
- Time zone: UTC+3 (TRT)

Yücekapı is a town (belde) and municipality in the Eleşkirt District, Ağrı Province, Turkey. Its population is 2,200 (2021).
