= Mount Kösedağ (Ağrı) =

Mountain in Turkey

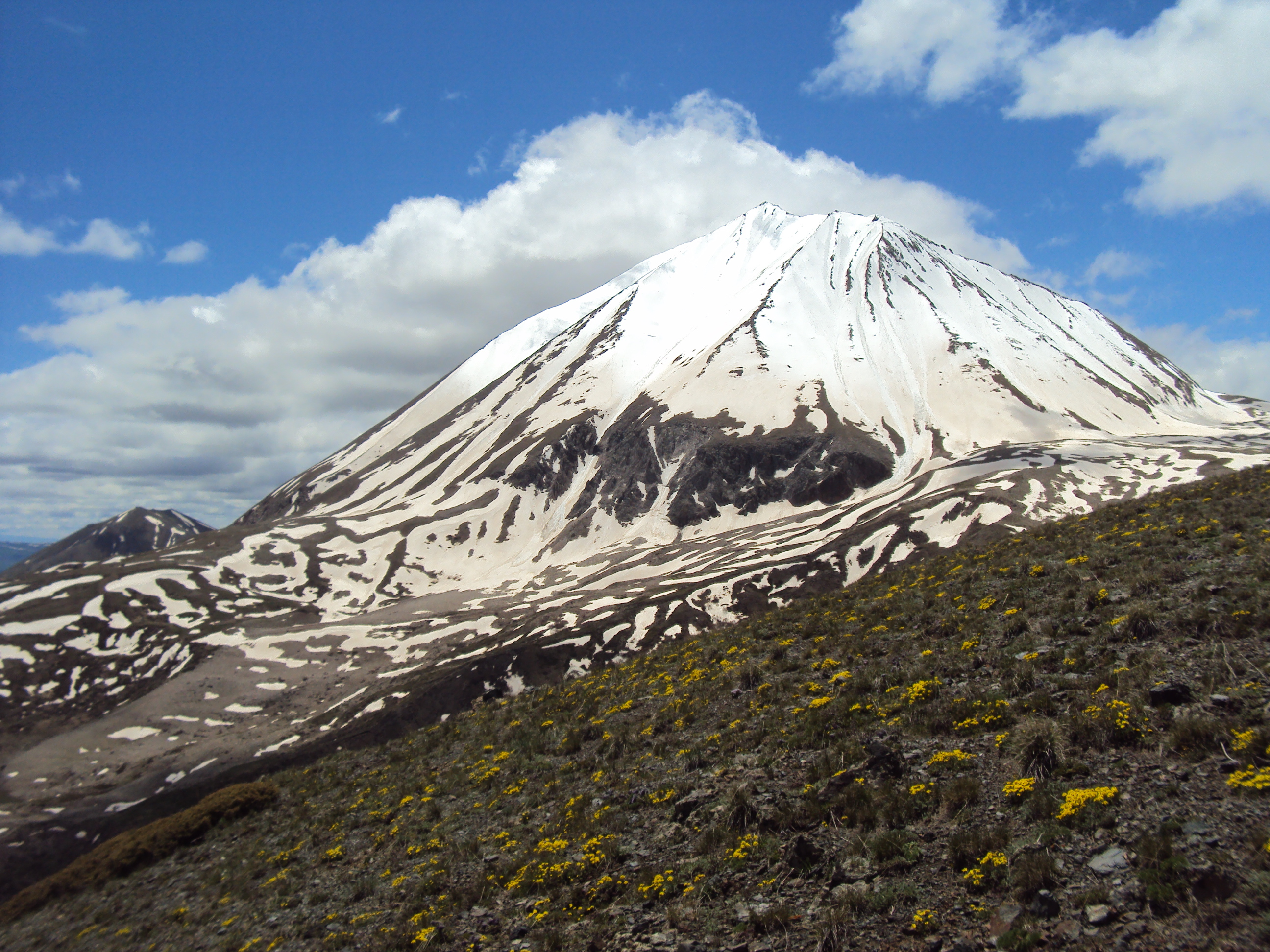

Highest point
- Elevation: 3,433 m (11,263 ft)
- Prominence: 2,679 m (8,789 ft)
- Coordinates: 39°53′43″N 42°38′37″E

Geography
- Location within Turkey
- Location: Eleşkirt, Ağrı Province, Turkey

Geology
- Mountain type: Tectonics

Mount Kösedağ (Turkish: Kösedağ) is a mountain located in Eleşkirt district of Ağrı, Turkey. It is approximately 20 km away from the district center.

== Geology and geomorphology ==
Kösedağ is one of the highest mountains of Ağrı. It is located in the north of Eleşkirt district center. It consists of two combined mountains, Big Kösedağ and Little Kösedağ. Little Kösedağ is 2.679 meters (8 ft 9.5 in) high.

== Gallery ==
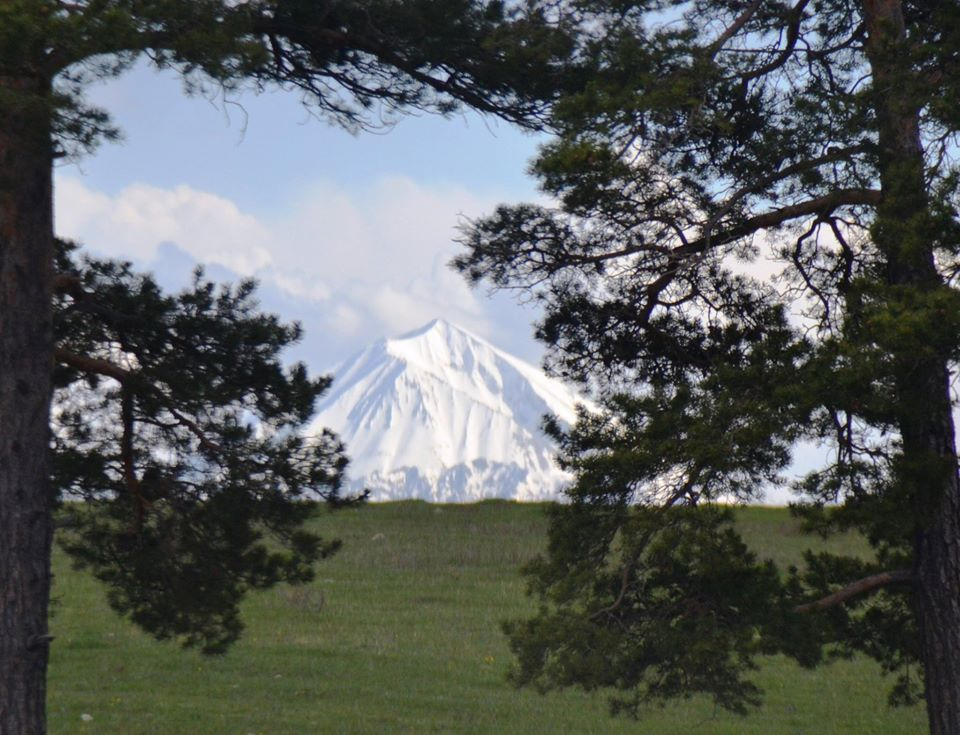
View of Kösedağ from Sarıkamış
