= Ishak Pasha Palace =

Palace in Ağrı Province, Turkey

- Turkish: İshak Paşa Sarayı
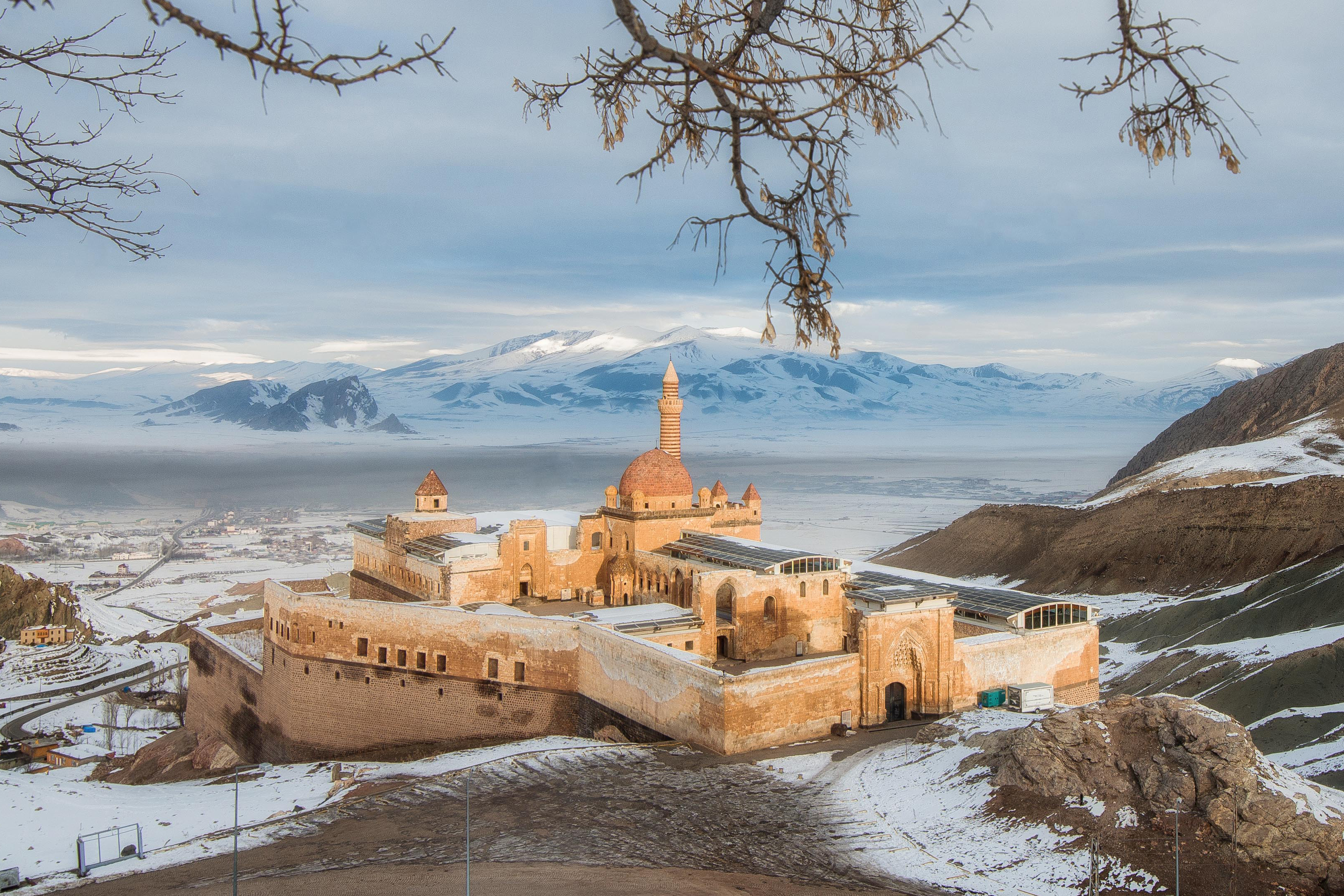
- Interactive map of the Ishak Pasha Palace area

General information
- Architectural style: Ottoman, Persian, Armenian
- Location: Doğubayazıt, Ağrı, Turkey
- Coordinates: 39°31′13.71″N 44°07′44.34″E
- Completed: 18th century

Website
- muze.gov.tr/muze-detay?SectionId=ISH01&DistId=MRK www.kulturportali.gov.tr/turkiye/agri/gezilecekyer/shak-pasa-sarayi

Ishak Pasha Palace (Kurdish: Qesra Îshaq Paşa; Turkish: İshak Paşa Sarayı) is a semi-ruined palace and administrative complex located in the Doğubeyazıt district of Ağrı province of eastern Turkey.

The Ishak Pasha Palace is an Ottoman-period palace whose construction was started in 1685 by the bey of the Beyazit province Colak Abdi Pasha of the Cildirogullari, a family of hereditary Kurdish pashas. Construction was continued by Ishak Pasha, a descendant of Abdi Pasha, who was to give his name to the palace and became the pasha of Çıldır from 1790 to 1791. According to the inscription on its door, the Harem section of the palace was completed by Ishak (Isaac) Pasha in 1784.

The Ishak Pasha Palace is one of the few examples of surviving historical Turkish palaces.

The palace was depicted on the reverse of the Turkish 100 new lira banknote of 2005–2009.

== History ==
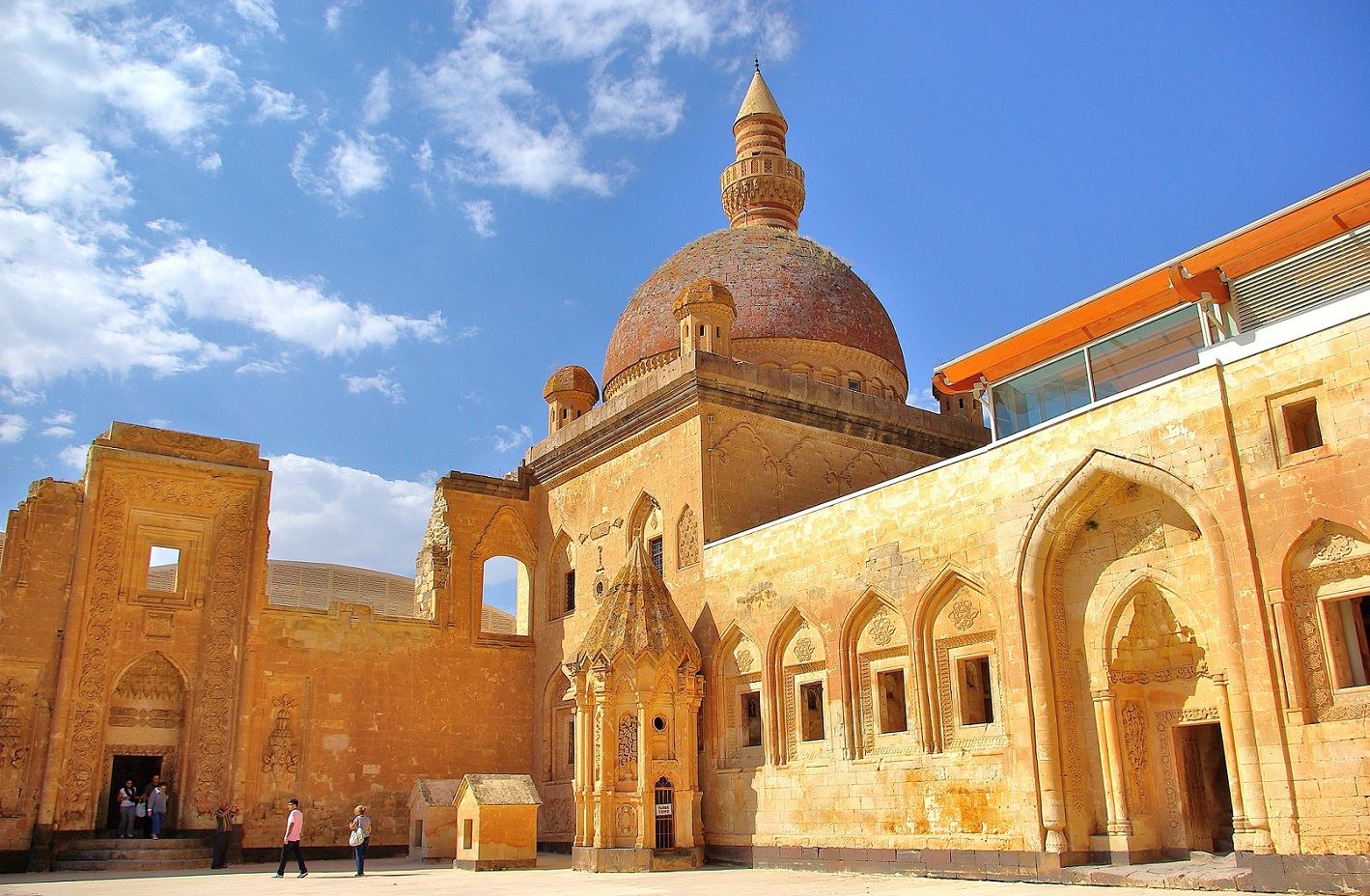
Second courtyard of Ishak Pasha Palace in 2010

Building of the palace commenced in 1685 and continued for decades. The work was finished in 1784 or 1785 CE. The palace was damaged by an earthquake in 1840 and for some time abandoned, but partly restored over the next 20 years. It was again damaged during the Russo-Turkish War (1877–1878). The structure was later used by Russians and during World War I when it was damaged by gunfire.

Later, the palace was used as the administrative centre for the area, and later as a military fort until 1937. Additional damage was caused later when stone from the building was taken for use to build new homes.

In 2000, the palace was added to the UNESCO Tentative List of World Heritage Sites. The UNESCO summary states:

Palace on the Silk Route near the Iranian frontier ... It is not at all in the Ottoman tradition but is rather a mixture of Anatolian, Iranian and North Mesopotamian architectural tradition. The traditional model used in the construction of the Royal Palaces in the capital cities like Bursa, Edirne and Istanbul was taken as an example in the design of Ishak Pasha Palace. The western influence in Ottoman architecture during the post-classical period can be observed...

However, the palace was constructed by Armenian and Georgian artisans, and the Armenia influence is very evident throughout the palace, especially the cupolas that resemble Armenian churches.

Major structural problems were found during a 2004 restoration and not fully repaired. In During a subsequent restoration, a new roof was added, as well as a shelter over some parts of the palace, made of wood and glass. Naturally, this changed the historic character of the palace. Another restoration started in 2011.

Visits are possible for a fee; visitors can view the Urartian rock tombs discovered in 1830 and said to be from centuries ago, perhaps between the 13th and the 9th century BCE.

== Location ==
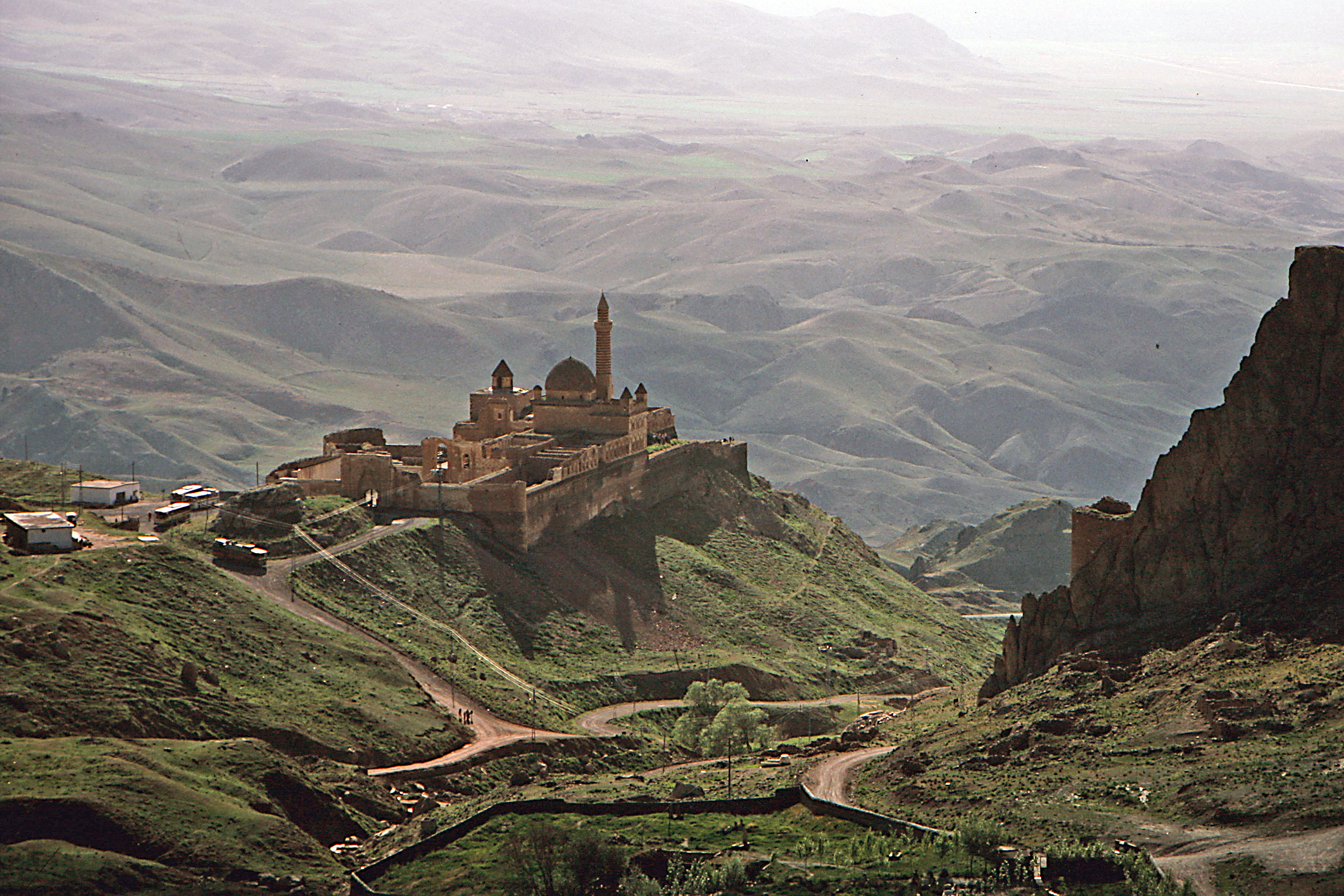
Ishak Paşa Sarayı, distant view, 2006

The palace is located near the Turkish border with Iran. It sits on a high platform with commanding views on its surrounding of the historic Silk Road, which gave it strategic importance.

== Architecture ==
According to UNESCO, the architecture of the palace reflects not only the Ottoman tradition but also a mixture of Iranian, North Mesapotamian and Anatolian architecture. According to UNESCO, Western architecture influence can be noted in the Ottoman designs carried out in the post-classical era.

== Sections of the palace ==
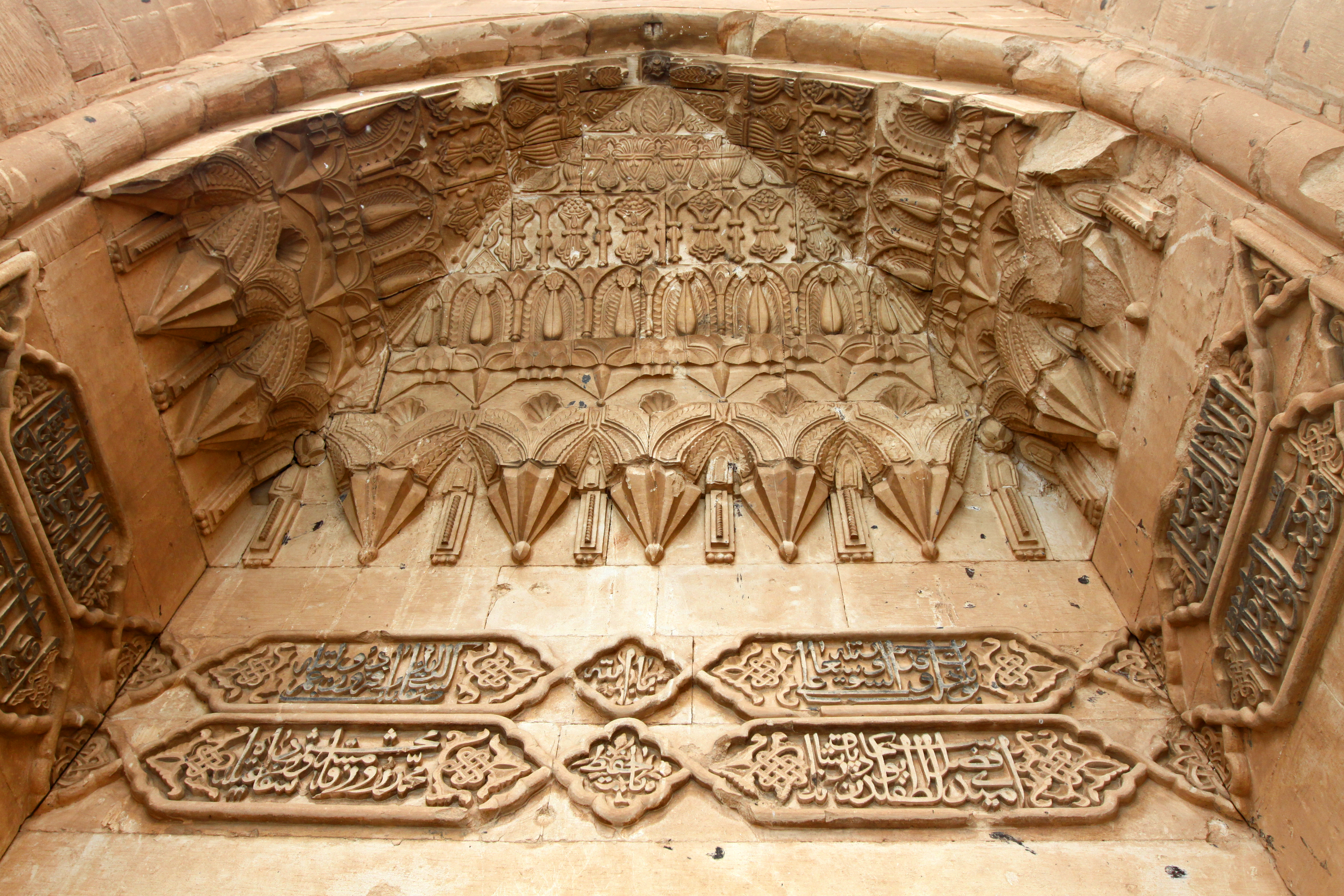
Top of entrance to haremlik

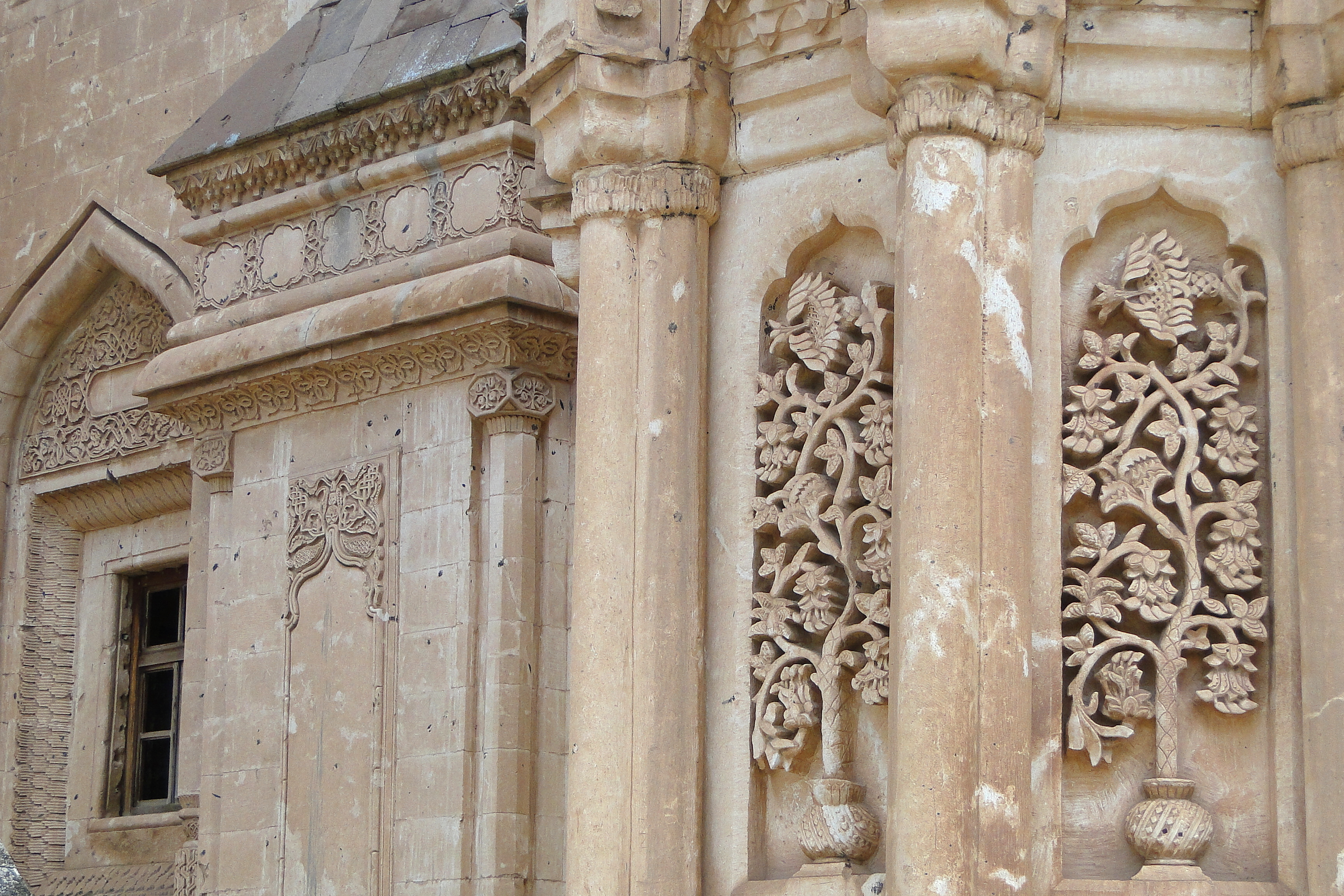
Tomb on second courtyard

The complex consists of following sections:

- Exterior façades
- First and second courts
- The men's quarter (selamlık)
- The mosque
- The soup kitchen (Darüzziyafe)
- Bath
- Harem section
- Hall for ceremonies and entertainment
- Arch gates
- Pantries and ammunition room
- The mausoleum
- The bakery
- Dungeons
- central heating system

The characteristic property of the palace is its combined Ottoman, Persian, Kurdish and Armenian architectural style.

== Gallery ==
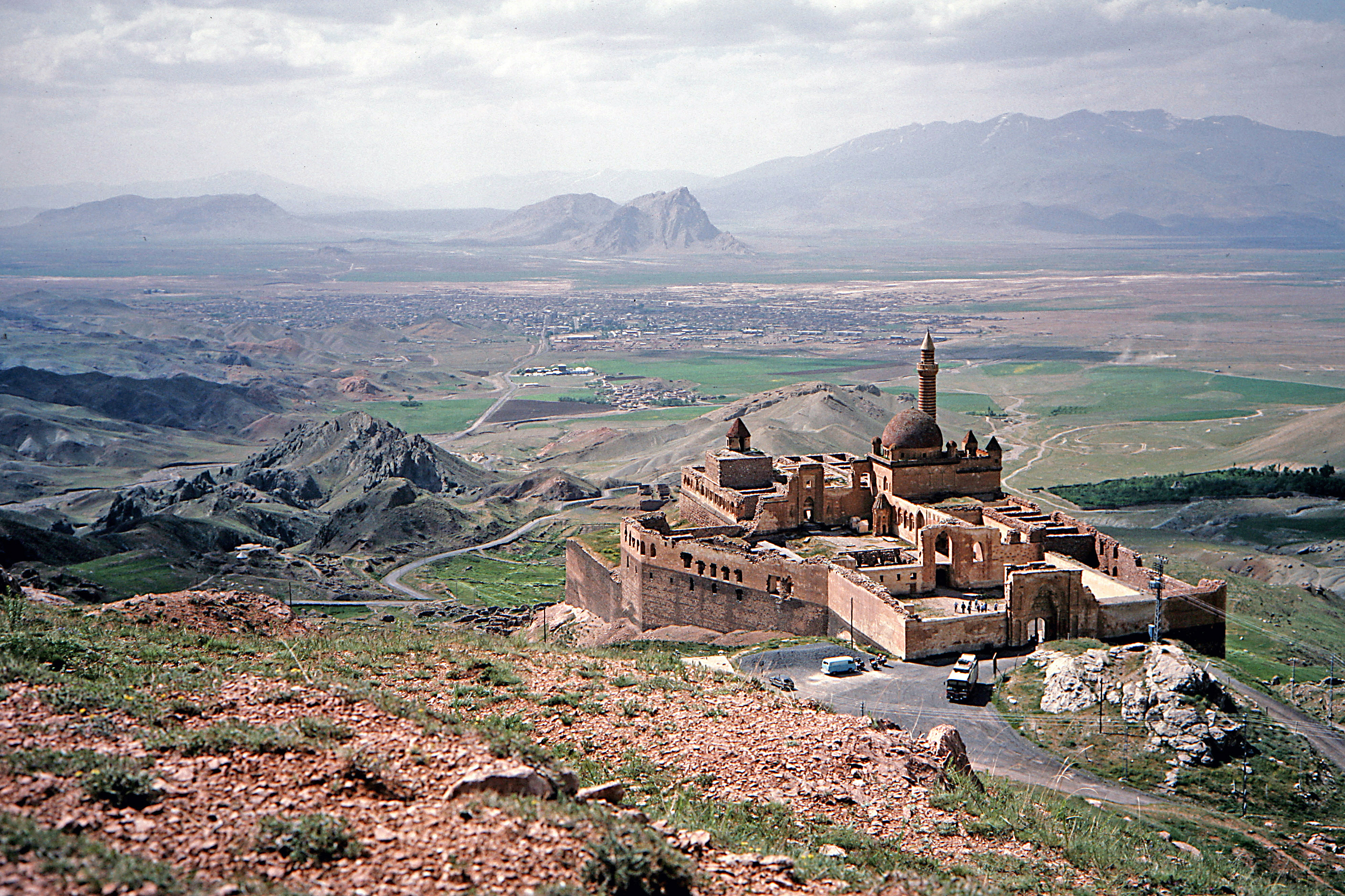
Ishak Pasha Palace, Turkey.

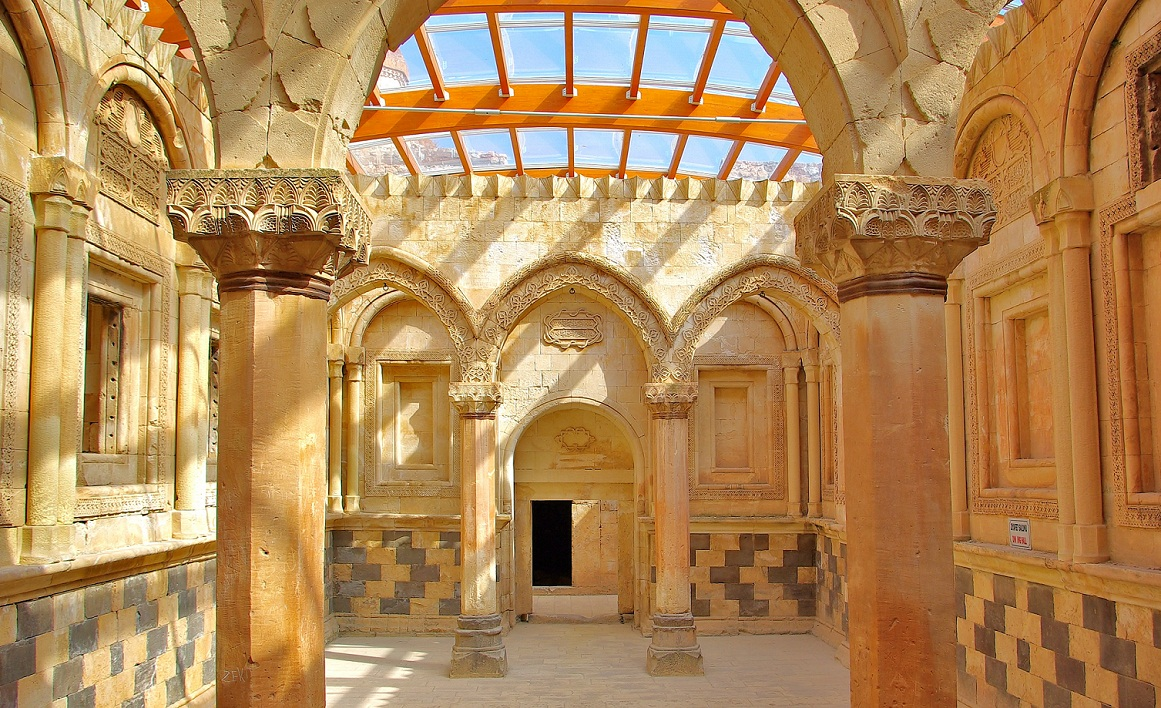
Interior view of the Palace

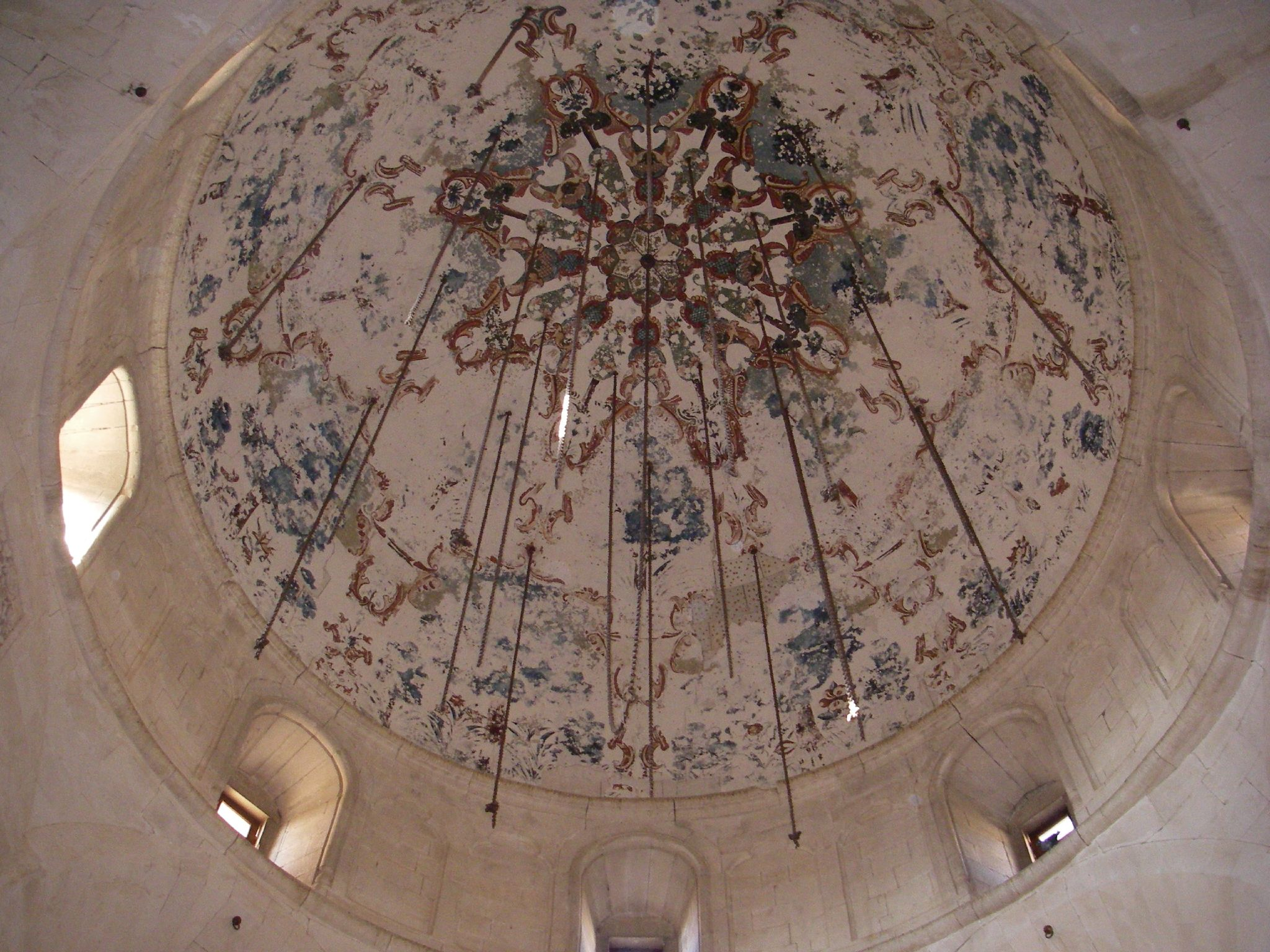
Looking up to the dome of the mosque of the Palace

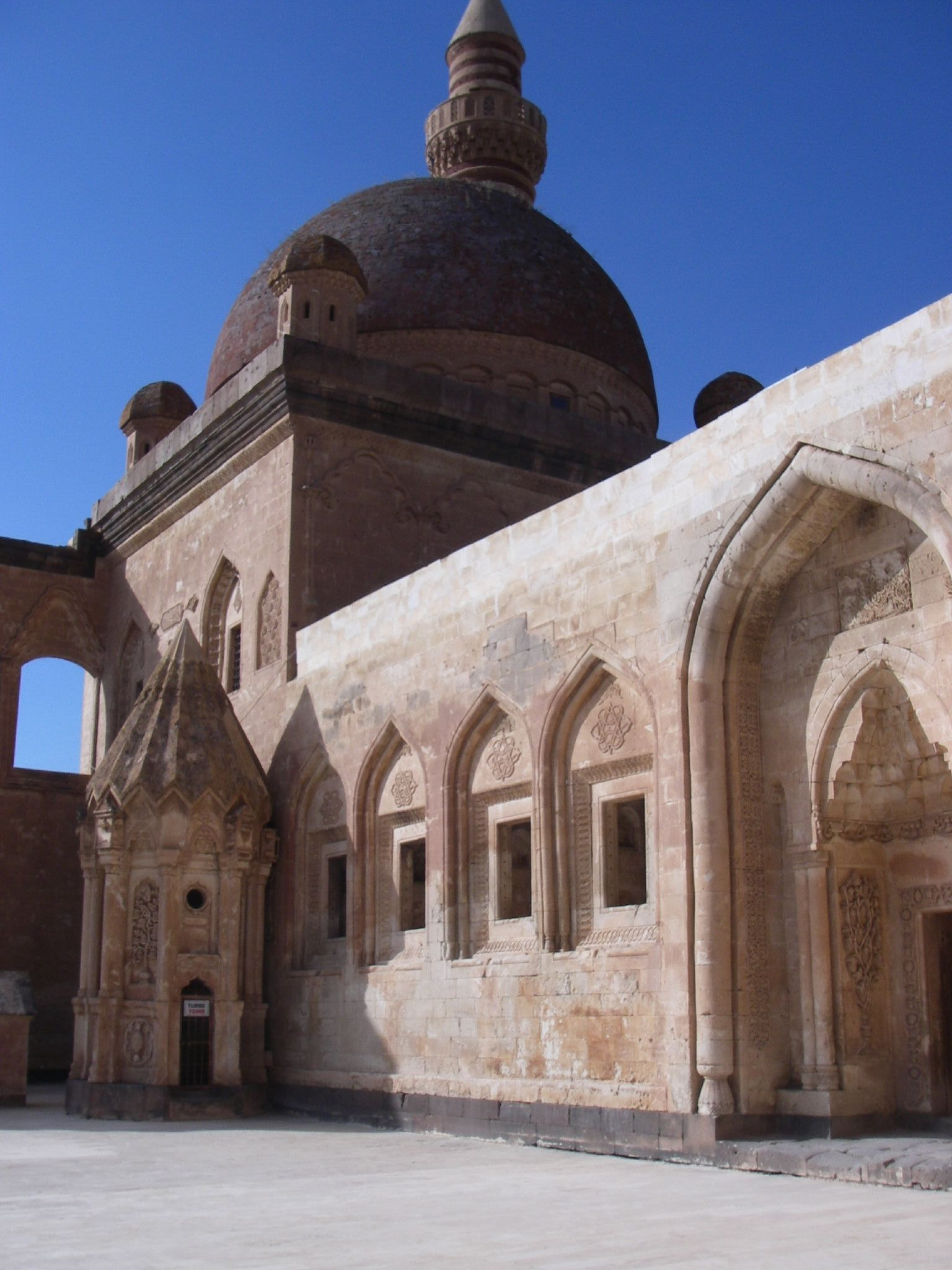
view from courtyard

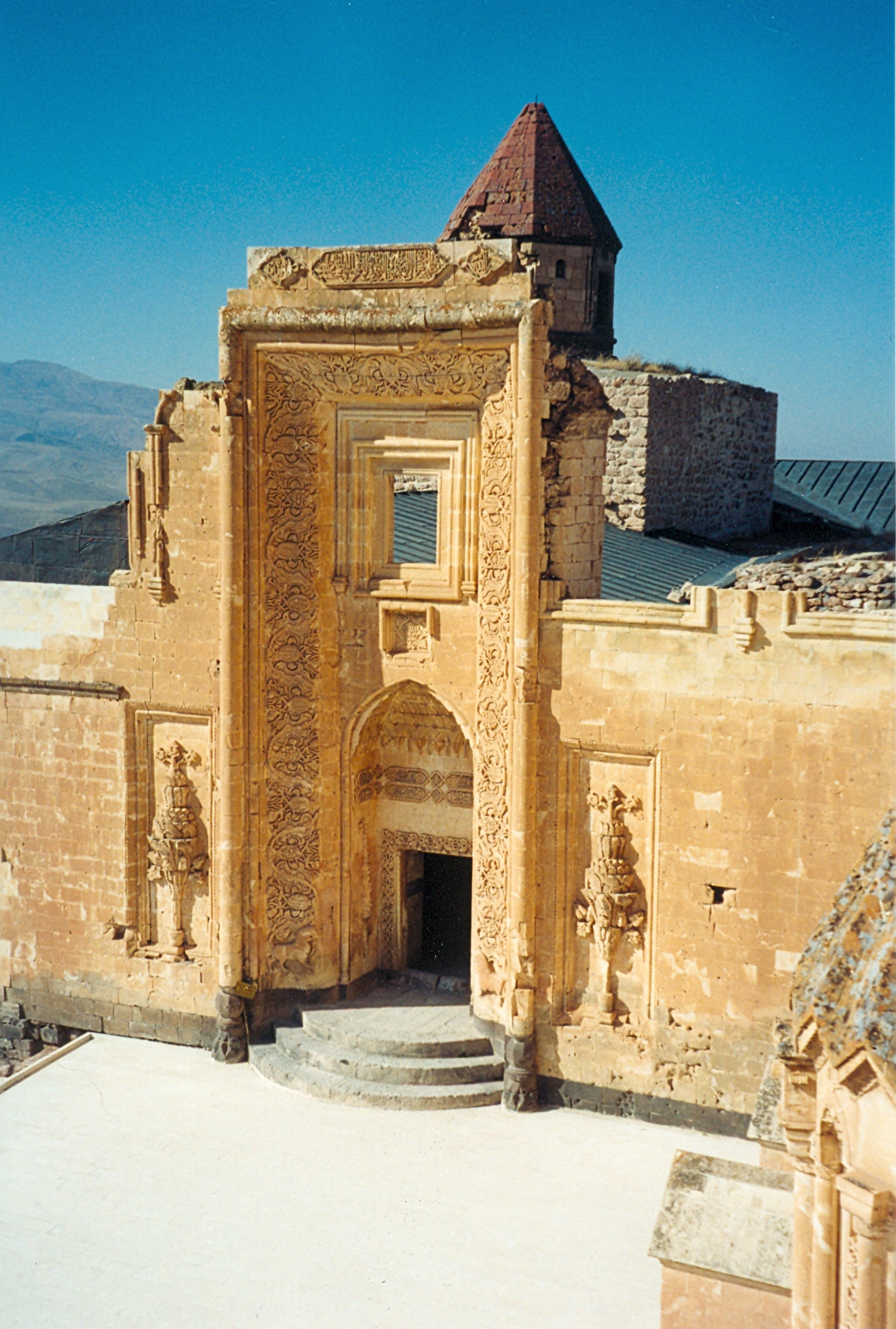
entrance to complex

== See also ==
- Ottoman Turkish architecture
