= Diyadin District =

District of Ağrı Province, Turkey

- District
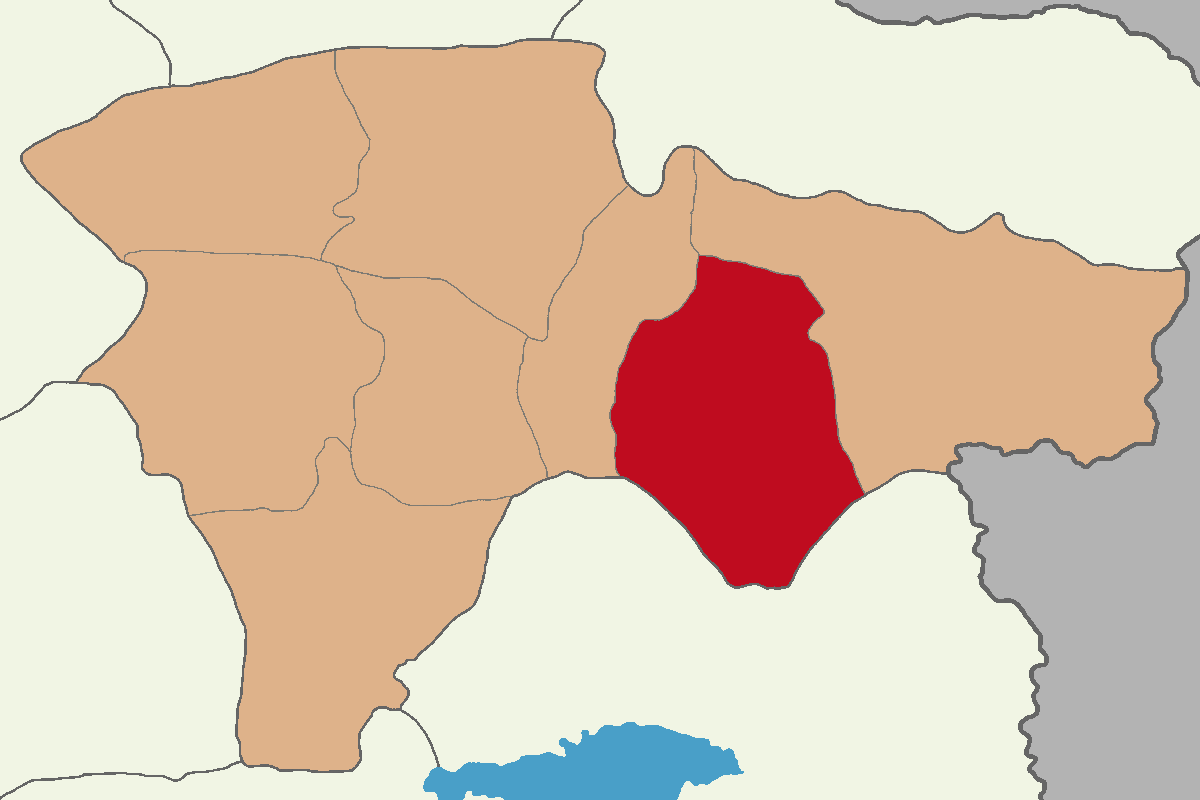
- Map showing Diyadin District in Ağrı Province

- Location in Turkey
- Coordinates: 39°32′N 43°41′E
- Country: Turkey
- Province: Ağrı
- Seat: Diyadin

Government
  - Kaymakam: Mustafa Karali
- Area: 1,351 km^{2} (522 sq mi)
- Population (2021): 40,286
  - Density: 29.82/km^{2} (77.23/sq mi)
- Time zone: UTC+3 (TRT)
- Website: www.diyadin.gov.tr

Diyadin District is a district of Ağrı Province in Turkey. Its seat is the town Diyadin. Its area is 1,351 km^{2}, and its population is 40,286 (2021). The current District Governor is Mustafa Karali.

== Composition ==
There is one municipality in Diyadin District:

- Diyadin

There are 62 villages in Diyadin District:

- Akçevre
- Akyolaç
- Altınkilit
- Aşağıakpazar
- Aşağıdalören
- Aşağıkardeşli
- Aşağıtütek
- Atadamı
- Atayolu
- Batıbeyli
- Boyalan
- Budak
- Burgulu
- Büvetli
- Davutköy
- Dedebulak
- Delihasan
- Dibekli
- Dokuztaş
- Gedik
- Göğebakan
- Gözüpek
- Günbuldu
- Hacıhalit
- Heybeliyurt
- Isaağa
- Kapanca
- Karapazar
- Karataş
- Kocaçoban
- Kotancı
- Kuşburnu
- Kuşlu
- Mollakara
- Mutlu
- Oğuloba
- Omuzbaşı
- Pirali
- Rahmankulu
- Satıcılar
- Soğuksu
- Sürenkök
- Sürmelikoç
- Şahinşah
- Şekerbulak
- Taşbasamak
- Taşkesen
- Tazekent
- Toklucak
- Ulukent
- Uysallı
- Yanıkçukur
- Yeniçadır
- Yeşildurak
- Yıldırım
- Yıldız
- Yolcupınarı
- Yörükatlı
- Yukarı Akpazar
- Yukarı Dalören
- Yukarı Tütek
- Yuva
