= Tigranakert =

Tigranakert or Dikranagerd may refer to Armenian cities founded by Tigranes the Great in 1st century B.C.:

- Tigranocerta, in historic Armenia (present-day Turkey), served as Armenia's capital
- Tigranakert (Nakhijevan) or Tigranavan, in present-day Nakhchivan Autonomous Republic, Azerbaijan
- Tigranakert of Artsakh, Nagorno-Karabakh
- Tigranakert (Utik), an ancient site in Gadabay District (a.k.a. Northern Artsakh), present-day Azerbaijan

== See also ==
- Battle of Tigranocerta
- Tigranes the Great
