= Diyadin, Azerbaijan =

Diyadin
- Municipality
- Location within Azerbaijan
- Coordinates: 39°27′N 44°59′E
- Country: Azerbaijan
- Autonomous republic: Nakhchivan
- District: Sharur

Population (2005)
  - Total: 343
- Time zone: UTC+4 (AZT)

Diyadin (also, Diadin) is a village and municipality in the Sharur District of Nakhchivan Autonomous Republic, Azerbaijan. It is located 15 km south of the district center. Its population is mainly involved with animal husbandry. There are a secondary school, library, club and a medical center in the village. It had a population of 343.
