= Hamur =

- Municipality
- Location within Turkey
- Coordinates: 39°36′37″N 42°59′33″E
- Country: Turkey
- Province: Ağrı
- District: Hamur

Government
  - Mayor: Ismet Aslan (AKP)
- Population (2021): 3,276
- Time zone: UTC+3 (TRT)
- Postal code: 04850
- Website: www.hamur.bel.tr

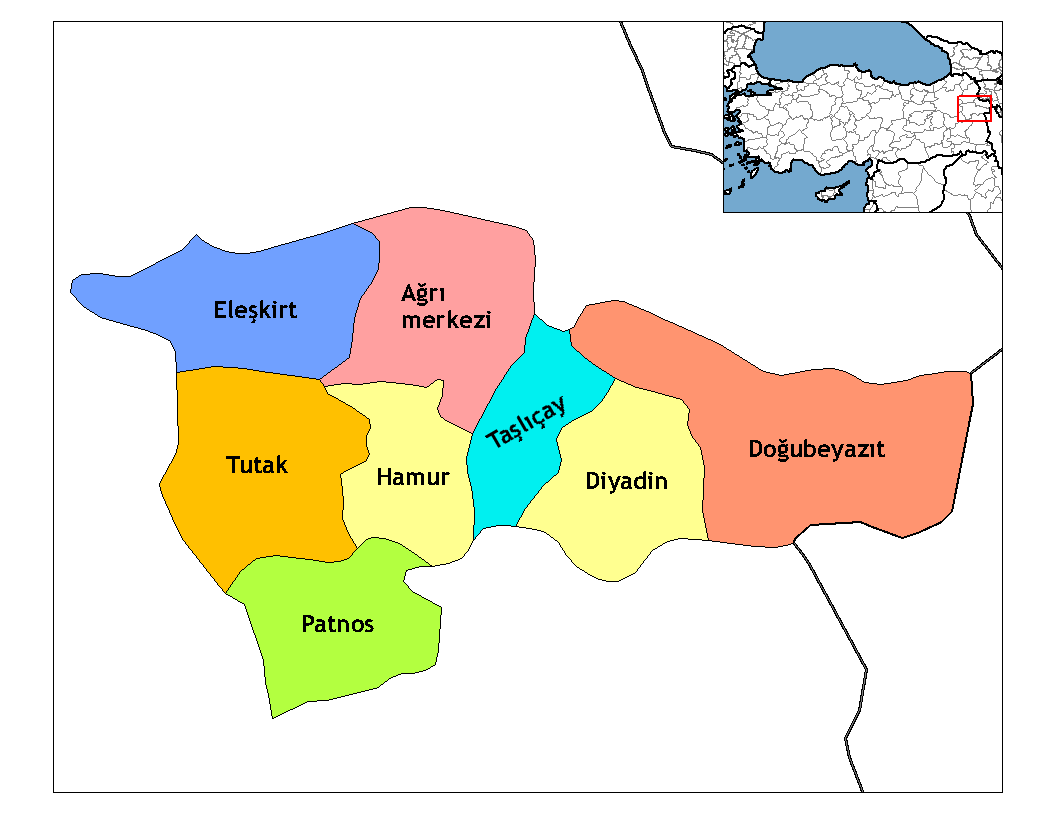
The districts of Ağrı province in Turkey.

Hamur (Kurdish: Xamûr) is a town in Ağrı Province of Turkey. It is the seat of Hamur District. Its population is 3,276 (2021). The mayor is Ismet Aslan (AKP).
