= Tutak, Turkey =

Tutak
- Municipality
- Location in Turkey
- Coordinates: 39°32′32″N 42°46′18″E
- Country: Turkey
- Province: Ağrı
- District: Tutak

Government
  - Mayor: Fevzi Sayam (AKP)
- Population (2021): 7,059
- Time zone: UTC+3 (TRT)
- Postal code: 04700
- Website: www.tutak.bel.tr

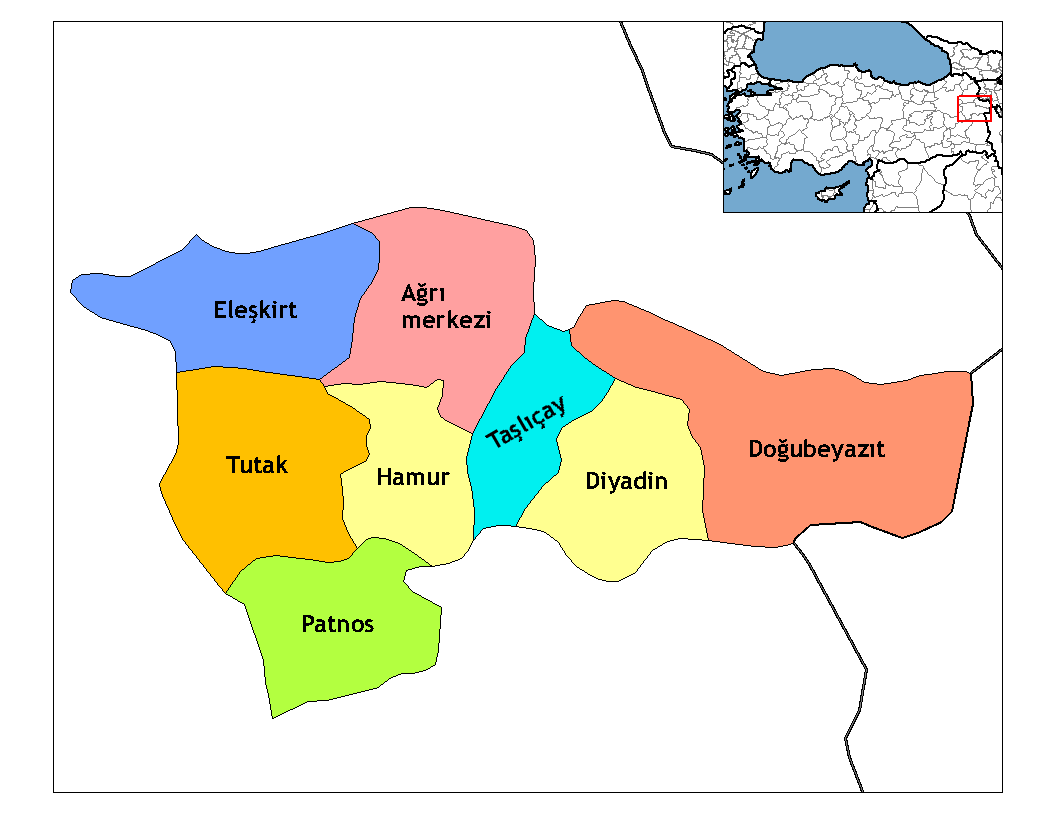

Tutak (Kurdish: Dûtax), is a town in Ağrı Province in the Eastern Anatolia region of Turkey. It is the seat of Tutak District. Its population is 7,059 (2021). It is located on a small plain surrounded by high mountains and watered by the Murat River, on the road from the city of Ağrı to the district of Patnos. Its altitude is 1,535 m. The mayor is Fevzi Sayan (AKP).

== Notable people ==
- Halis Öztürk, politician
