= Eleşkirt =

Eleşkirt Alashkert • Ալաշկերտ
- Municipality
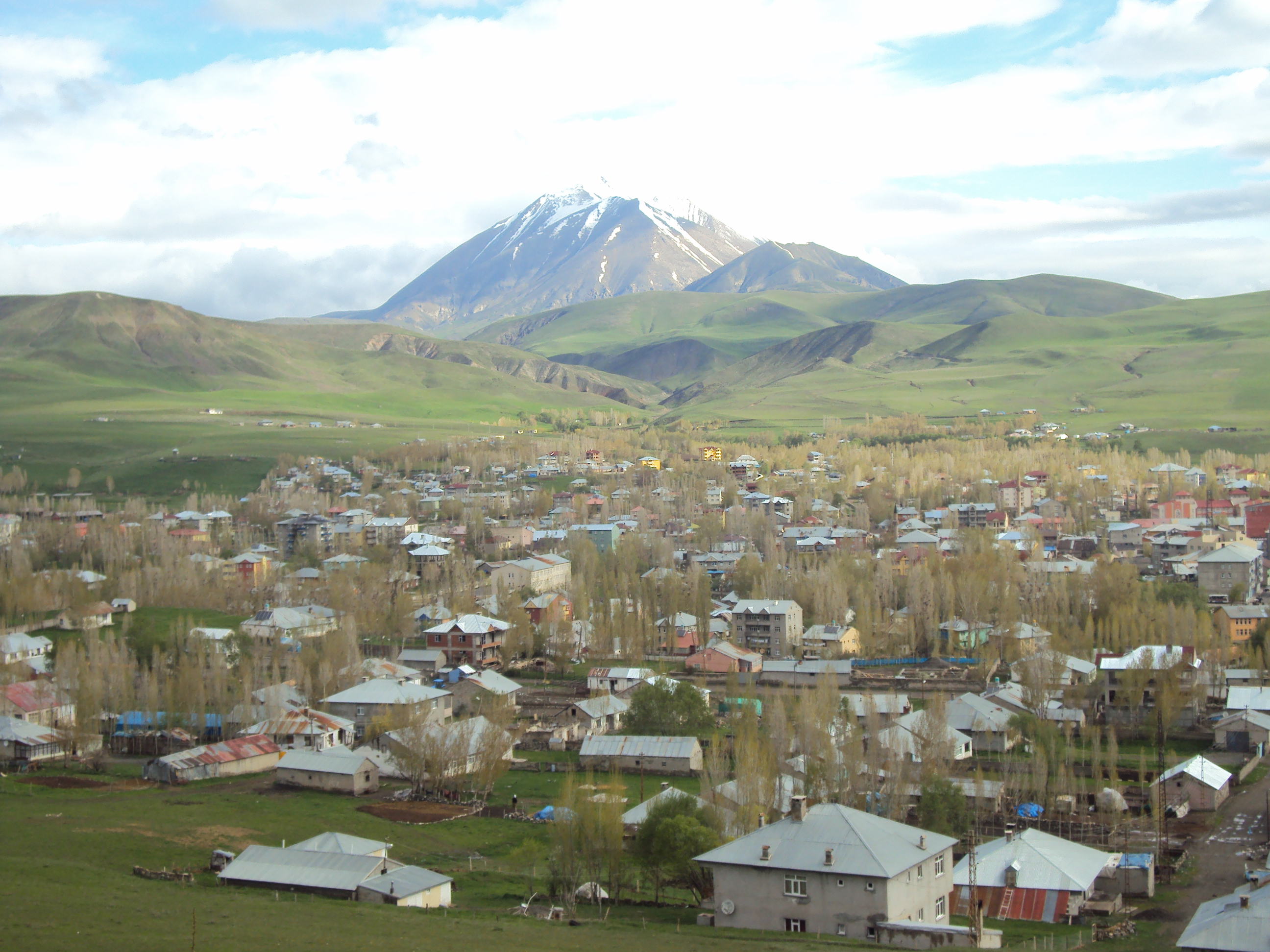
- General view of Eleşkirt. Mount Kösedağ appears in the background

- Location within Turkey
- Coordinates: 39°47′53″N 42°40′28″E
- Country: Turkey
- Province: Ağrı
- District: Eleşkirt

Government
  - Mayor: Ramazan Yakut (SP)
- Elevation: 1,840 m (6,040 ft)
- Population (2021): 10,191
- Time zone: UTC+3 (TRT)
- Website: www.eleskirt.bel.tr

Eleşkirt (Kurdish: Zêdikan) is a town of Ağrı Province in Turkey. It is the seat of Eleşkirt District. Its population is 10,191 (2021). Its name is a transference from Alashkert (Armenian: Ալաշկերտ, romanized: Alaškert), the valley's former administrative centre but now a village known as Toprakkale. It was known as Vagharshakert in medieval sources. At the time of the Russo-Turkish War of 1877–1878 approximately half of the population consisted of Armenians and the rest of Kurds and Turks.

The mayor is Ramazan Yakut (Felicity Party).

== Etymology ==
The name Eleşkirt is the Turkish form of the Armenian Alashkert (Ալաշկերտ). In historical Armenian sources, the town and its surrounding region were also known as Vagharshakert (Վաղարշակերտ) or Valarshakert. This name is associated with Vologases I of Armenia (Armenian: Vagharsh I), a king of the Arsacid dynasty of Armenia who ruled from approximately AD 117 to 140.

The name Vagharshakert consists of two elements: Vagharsh, the Armenian form of the Iranian royal name Vologases (also rendered Balash or Valash in Persian), and the suffix -kert, meaning "made" or "founded". The Armenian suffix -kert is of Iranian origin, deriving from an Iranian form meaning "made" or "done", cognate with Middle Persian -kird or -gird. It also occurs in place names such as Tigranakert and Khosrovakert, where it indicates a settlement attributed to a particular founder. Thus, Vagharshakert can be interpreted etymologically as "founded by Vologases" or "Vologases' foundation".

According to the Armenian Soviet Encyclopedia, Vologases I founded or established the town in the second century AD on the site of an earlier Urartian settlement called Anashe (Անաշե). It was named Vagharshakert (or Valarshakert) in his honour, a name which subsequently evolved into Alashkert. Vologases I is also credited with founding or rebuilding Vagharshapat, in present-day Armenia, another town named after him.

The historical settlement of Alashkert was situated at what is now the village of Toprakkale, formerly the administrative centre of the district. The name Alashkert was also applied to the surrounding plain and region. During the early years of the Republic of Turkey, the district's administrative centre was transferred from Toprakkale to the settlement of Zedikan, which subsequently became known as Eleşkirt. The Eleşkirt District Governorate confirms that the modern Turkish name derives from the Armenian Alashkert.

== Notable people ==
- Şakiro
- Hmayak Siras
