= Taşlıçay =

- Municipality
- Location in Turkey
- Coordinates: 39°38′0″N 43°22′40″E
- Country: Turkey
- Province: Ağrı
- District: Taşlıçay

Government
  - Mayor: İsmet Taşdemir (AKP)
- Population (2021): 6,140
- Time zone: UTC+3 (TRT)
- Postal code: 04800
- Website: www.taslicay.bel.tr

Taşlıçay (Azerbaijani: Daşlıçay, Kurdish: Avkevir, Armenian: Դաշլիչայ Ստորին, romanized: Dašličay Storin, lit. 'Lower Taşlıçay') is a town in Ağrı Province in the Eastern Anatolia region of Turkey. It is the seat of Taşlıçay District. Its population is 6,140 (2021). It is located in the valley of the Murat River on the road from the city of Ağrı to Doğubeyazıt and Turkey's border with Iran. Its altitude is 1,660 m. The mayor is İsmet Taşdemir (AKP).

The southern extensions of the Perili mountain on the Aras Mountains to the north of the district and the Ziyaret Tepesi (2800 m), the south is surrounded by Aladağ and the south-western part is surrounded by the eastern part of the Kandil mountain.

The highest point of the district is the Muratbaşı (Koçbaşı) (3510m) mountain on Aladağ in the south. Other high places are: Ziyaret hill in the north 1800 m, Lake Balık Mountain 3159m, wind hill in the south east 2828 m, Mount Kandil in the southwest 2750 m.

== History ==
A burial mound (höyük) to the south of Taşlıçay and numerous other ruins in the district indicate a long and varied human presence in the region. There is an Urartu temple and an Armenian monastery on the hill above the village of Taşteker.
