= Diyadin =

- Municipality
- Location in Turkey
- Coordinates: 39°32′24″N 43°40′38″E
- Country: Turkey
- Province: Ağrı
- District: Diyadin

Government
  - Mayor: Özgür Demir (AKP)
- Elevation: 1,925 m (6,316 ft)
- Population (2021): 20,302
- Time zone: UTC+3 (TRT)
- Postal code: 04900
- Website: www.diyadin.bel.tr

Diyadin (Kurdish: Giyadîn; Armenian: Տատէոն, romanized: Tatēon) is a town in Ağrı Province of Turkey, at the foot of Mount Tendürek, a high peak in the Aladağlar range that stands between Ağrı and the north shore of Lake Van. It is the seat of Diyadin District. Its population is 20,302 (2021).

== Politics ==
The mayor is Betül Yaşar (HDP).

== Economy ==
As of 1920, the area was known for its sulphur production.

== Places of interest ==
- The Meya caves
- The hot-springs
- Church
