= Ağrı Province =

Province of Turkey

Ağrı Province Ağrı ili
- Province
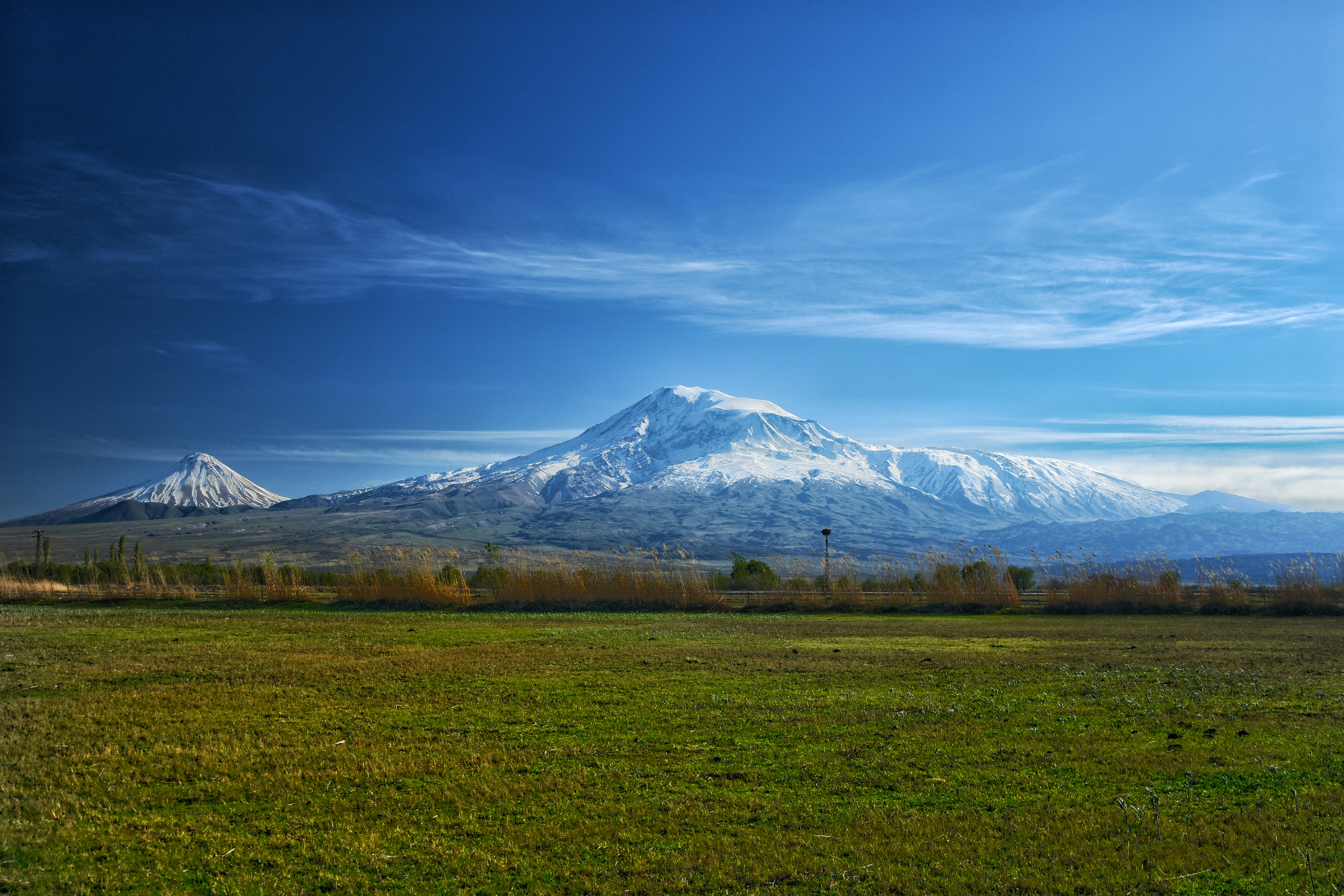
- Ağrı Mountain (also called Mount Ararat)

- Location of the province within Turkey
- Country: Turkey
- Seat: Ağrı

Government
  - Governor: Dr. Önder Bozkurt
- Area: 11,099 km^{2} (4,285 sq mi)
- Population (2023): 511,238
  - Density: 46.062/km^{2} (119.30/sq mi)
- Time zone: UTC+3 (TRT)
- Area code: 0472
- Website: www.agri.gov.tr

Ağrı Province (Turkish: Ağrı ili, Armenian: Արարատ մարզ, Kurdish: Parêzgeha Agirîyê) is located in eastern Turkey, bordering Iran to the east and the provinces of Kars to the north, Erzurum to the northwest, Muş and Bitlis to the southwest, Van to the south, and Iğdır to the northeast. Its area is 11,099 km^{2}, and its population is 511,238 (2023). The provincial capital is Ağrı, situated on a 1,650 metres (5,410 ft) high plateau. Doğubayazıt was the capital of the province until 1946. The current governor is Mustafa Koç.

The province is considered part of Western Armenia and was part of the ancient province of Ayrarat of Kingdom of Armenia. Before the Armenian genocide, modern Ağri Province was part of the six Armenian vilayets. The province is part of Turkish Kurdistan and has a Kurdish majority.

== Districts ==
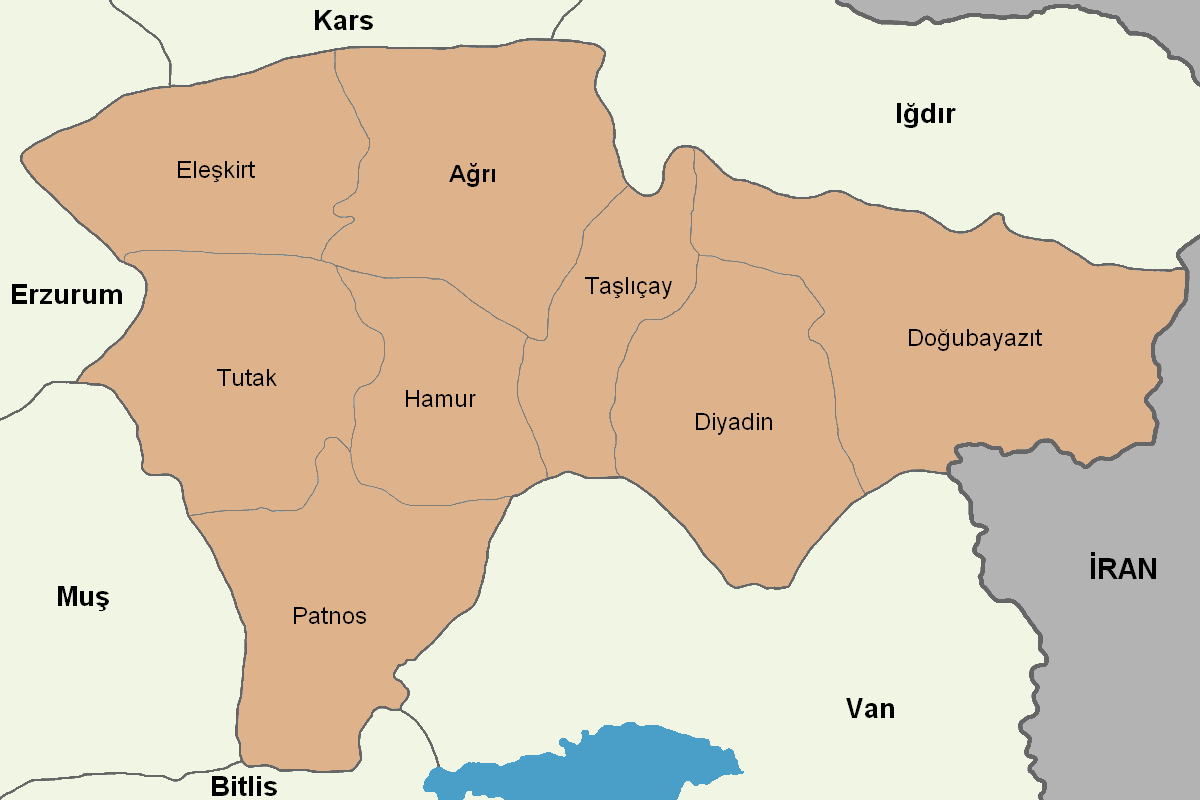
Districts of Ağrı Province

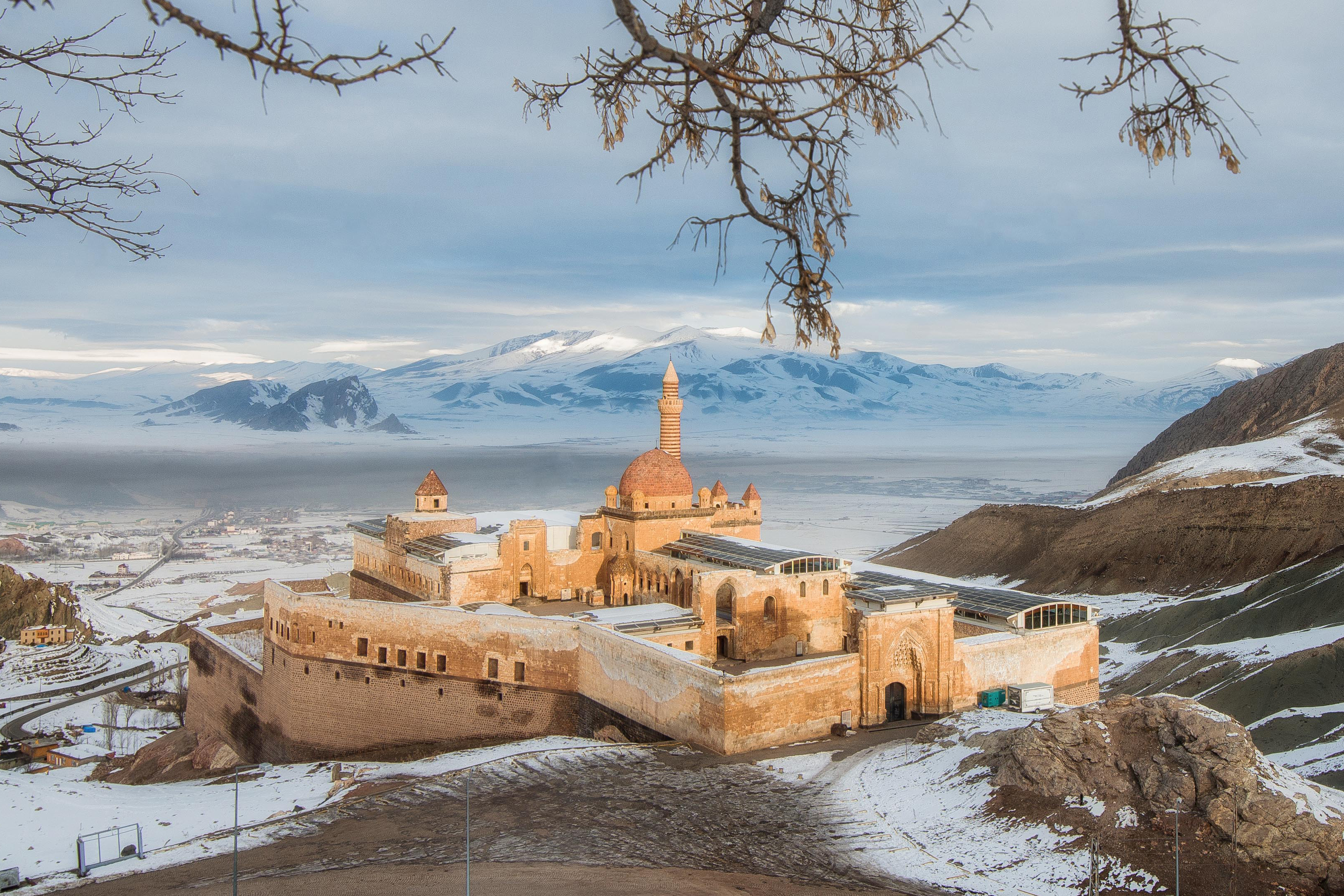
Ishak Pasha Palace

Ağrı province is divided into eight districts (capital district in bold):

- **Ağrı**
- Diyadin
- Doğubayazıt
- Eleşkirt
- Hamur
- Patnos
- Taşlıçay
- Tutak

== Geography ==
Ağrı province is surrounded by the Aras Mountains from the north. Ağrı is named after the nearby Mount Ararat, a 5,137 metres (16,854 ft) high stratovolcano, the highest mountain in Turkey and a national symbol to Armenians (see Western Armenia). It can be climbed from here and can be seen from parts of Azerbaijan, Iran, Georgia, and Armenia. The nearest town to the mountain is Doğubayazıt.

46% of the province is mountainous, 29% is plain, 18% is plateau, and 7% high meadow. As well as Ararat there are many other peaks over 3,000m, including Mount Kösedağ, Aladağlar and Tendürek. The plains are fertile, being covered in volcanic deposits, and are used for growing grains and grazing. Various tributaries of the Murat River (which later feeds the Euphrates) flow through the area and water these plains. The high meadows are used for grazing.

The weather here is very cold (average temperatures are around −10 °C (14 °F) in winter) and the mountainsides are mainly bare. There are a number of important passes and routes through the mountains.

== History ==
Historical population
Year	Pop.	±% p.a.
1927	57,177	—
1935	107,206	+8.17%
1940	121,477	+2.53%
1950	155,455	+2.50%
1960	215,116	+3.30%
1970	290,311	+3.04%
1980	368,009	+2.40%
1990	437,093	+1.74%
2000	528,744	+1.92%
2010	542,022	+0.25%
2020	535,435	−0.12%
Source:Turkstat

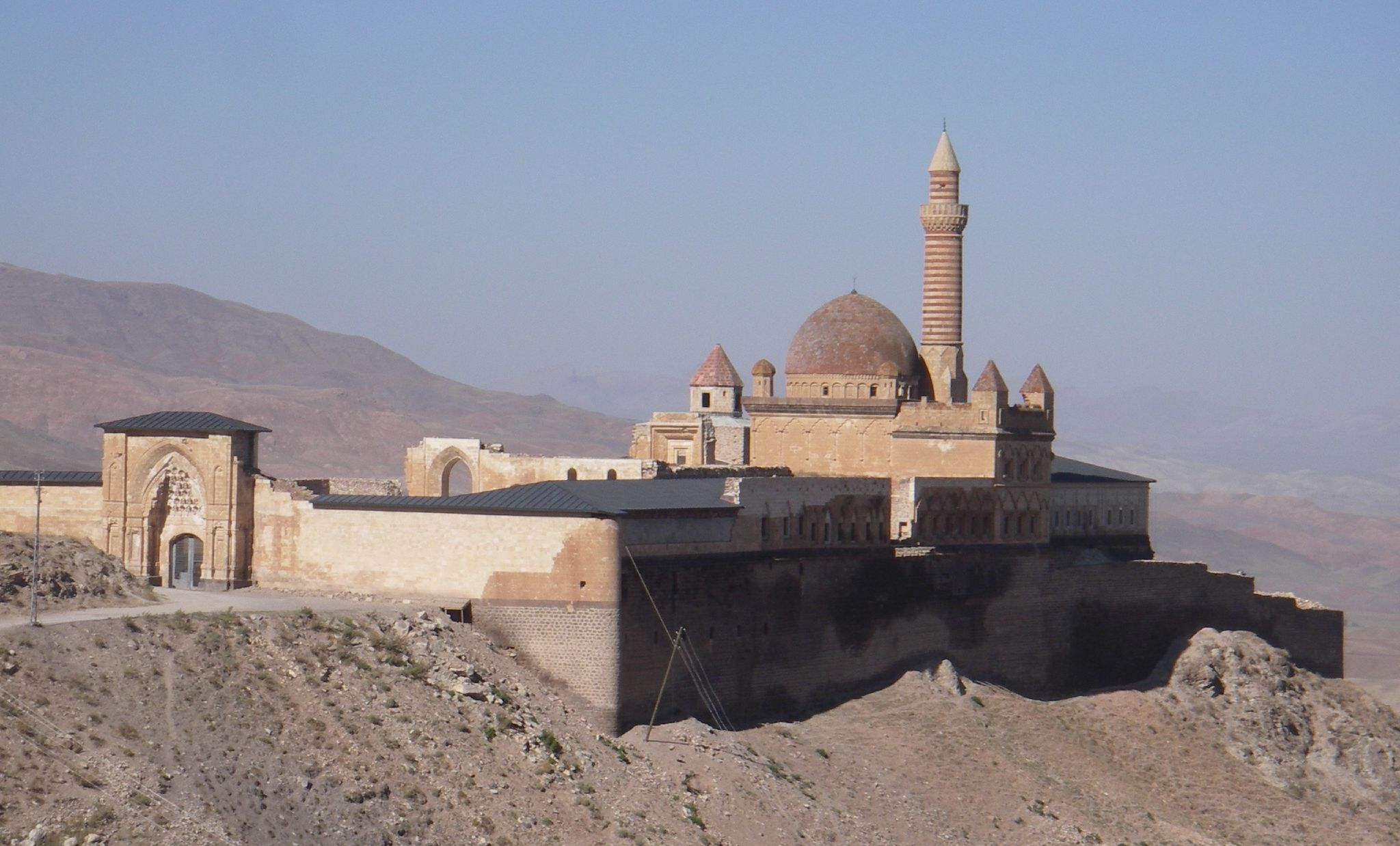
Ishak Paşa Sarayı in Doğubayazıt district of Ağrı Province, distant view 2006.

The plateau of Ağrı was controlled by the Kingdom of Urartu until its transition to the Kingdom of Armenia. The area was coveted by many as a gateway between east and west. It was conquered numerous times by Assyrians, Achaemenid Persians, Greeks, Romans, Byzantines, Arabs, Georgians, Mongols, different Persian Empires, and finally by the Seljuq and Ottoman Turks.

The first Muslims in the area were the Abbasids in 872. The Turkish tribes began to pass through in huge numbers following the defeat of the Byzantine armies at Malazgirt in 1071, sometimes pursued by Mongols. The land was brought into the Ottoman Empire by Sultan Selim I following the Battle of Chaldiran. The region was part of the Erzurum Vilayet during the Ottoman Empire.During the late 19th and early 20th centuries, the province was the scene of the Armenian–Kurdish Conflicts in Ağrı, which reflected the tensions between Kurdish tribal groups, Armenian nationalists, and the weakening Ottoman authority.

=== Inspectorates-General ===
In the late 1920s, in an attempt to curb the Ararat rebellion, the province was included into the First Inspectorate-General (Turkish: Birinci Umumi Müfettişlik) comprising the provinces of Mardin, Diyarbakır, Van, Elazıĝ, Bitlis, Hakkari, Şanlıurfa and Siirt.

In September 1935 the province was transferred into the third Inspectorate General (Umumi Müfettişlik, UM). The third UM span over the provinces of Erzurum, Artvin, Rize, Trabzon, Kars Gümüşhane, Erzincan and Ağrı. It was governed by an Inspector General seated in the city of Erzurum. The Inspectorate General was dissolved in 1952 during the Government of the Democrat Party.

=== Recent events ===
On August 19, 2006, the Tabriz–Ankara gas pipeline exploded in the province. Turkish authorities suspected that Kurdish PKK rebels were behind the incident.

== Ağrı today ==
The economy is mainly agricultural. People also live by breeding animals. Ağrı attracts tourists to the mountains, for climbing and trekking in summers, and skiing in winters. Places of interest include:

- Ishak Pasha Palace in Doğubayazıt
- Mount Tendürek in Doğubayazıt with what some claim to be the second-largest meteor crater in the world
- Aznavur Tepe in Patnos
- The tomb of Ahmedi Hani, who wrote the Kurdish epic Mem and Zin

== Demographics ==
District	Total	Urban	Rural
Ağrı	150,263	310,896	224,539
Patnos	123,203	63,786	59,417
Doğubayazıt	120,320	80,607	39,334
Diyadin	41,789	20,387	20,889
Eleşkirt	32,316	9,969	22,347
Tutak	29,987	7,018	22,969
Taşlıçay	20,028	6,180	13,848
Hamur	17,908	3,293	14,615
**Province**	**535,435**	**310,896**	**224,539**
