= Han Mahmud Revolt =

- Part of Timeline of Kurdish uprisings
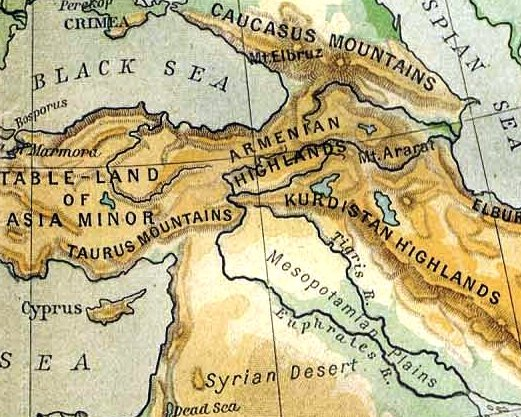
- Physical map of Near East
Date	1838
Location	Hakkâri, Cizre, Van Eyalet
Result	Ottoman victory: Han Mahmud submits to Ottoman authority and is imprisoned and exiled

Belligerents
Ottoman Empire; Cizre Emirate; Hakkari Emirate	Forces of Han Mahmud

Commanders and leaders
(Ottoman Empire) Hafız Mehmed Pasha (Ottoman Empire) Osman Nuri Pasha (Ottoman Empire) Bedirhan Bey (Ottoman Empire) Seyfeddin Bey; Nurullah Bey (Ottoman Empire) Galip Bey	Han Mahmud

Strength
Unknown	2,000–3,000 regular troops

The Han Mahmud Revolt was an uprising led by the Kurdish emir Han Mahmud against Ottoman rule in 1838. From Hoşap, Han Mahmud had extended his rule over the pashas of Hakkâri and the surrounding territories, becoming one of the strongest Kurdish potentates in the region. The Ottoman rulers of Cizre and Hakkâri had their authorities either cooperating or supporting them against Han Mahmud in 1838, and Han Mahmud was finally compelled to recognize Ottoman supremacy. He was subsequently imprisoned and exiled, though he was pardoned and permitted to return before launching another revolt in 1841.

== Background ==
Han Mahmud, the bey of Hakkari, was the most powerful Kurdish ruler in the early 1830s. With Hoşap Castle as his power base, he ruled over Müküs, Kavaş and Westan. His power extended toward the Iranian frontier, and by the late 1830s he had increasingly defied Ottoman authority.

The Ottoman officials were especially alarmed at Han Mahmud's relations with the adjoining Kurdish emirs in the east and northern regions. The emirs of Hakkari and Cizre had long been rivals of Han Mahmud, and their struggle with him seemed to be touching off a regional war, to the anxiety of the Ottomans. Thus Erzurum Müşiri Osman Nuri Pasha moved to mediate the situation.

By 1838 Han Mahmud's position had been increasingly impossible to control. Ottoman sources portrayed him as possessing a large number of armed men, and that he was in possession of Hoşap and the Iranian frontier, so that he was not to be easily dislodged by arms if he should be attacked. Osman Nuri Pasha also feared that Han Mahmud would turn to the emirs of Hakkari, Jizire, or even Iran for support if he should be threatened by Ottoman reprisals. So the rivalry between Han Mahmud and the emirs of Hakkari and Cizre was exacerbated.

Meanwhile Nurullah Bey of Hakkari and Bedirhan Bey of Cizre sought to weaken Han Mahmud. The Ottoman statesmen, in short, saw an opportunity to strike at the paramount Kurdish potentate in the district.

== Revolt ==
In 1838, the Ottoman rulers were still struggling against insubordination in Kurdistan. To the north, Han Mahmud continued to defy his opponents from his stronghold at Hoşap Castle, and to the south, the rebellion of Amidiyeli Ismail Pasha had evolved into yet another serious threat to the Ottoman regime. Han Mahmud was now one of the leading Kurdish princes in the area, while Ismail Pasha, who had been previously sent to Amidye Sanjak during Mir Muhammad’s rebellion, later found himself at odds with the governor of Mosul.

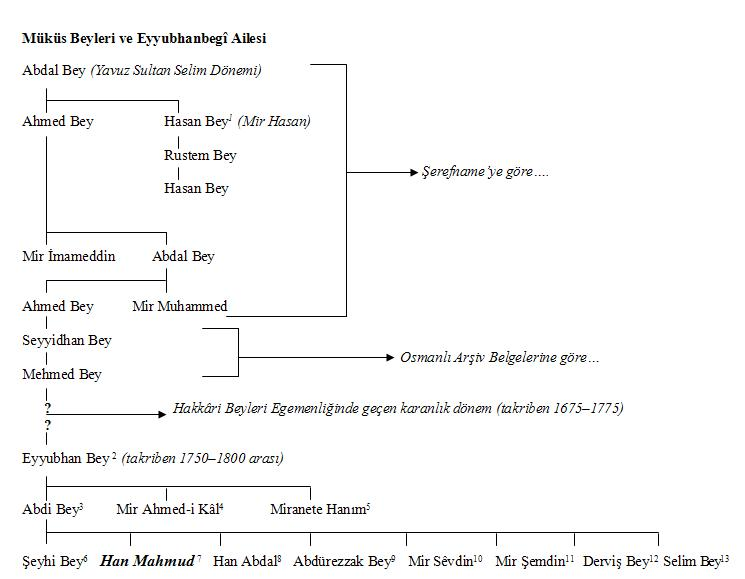
Family tree of the Müküs Beys.

Ismail Pasha, on the other hand, resisted in the south, while Osman Nuri Pasha, governor of Erzurum, took the Han Mahmud matter into his own hands. Han Mahmud’s seat on the Iranian border was already seen as extremely strategic, and his possession of Hoşap and its district, plus his appeal among the Kurdish emirs of the area, made his elimination all but impossible. He had long been a rival of Iran, Kurdistan, and the Ottoman state, and it is that policy of using those enmities that has kept him in place.

Osman Nuri Pasha was also charged with the supervision of the pending frontier adjustments with Iran, and with the inquiry into the Kurdish insurrection in the district of Van, and the Han Mahmud question. The Ottoman authorities were anxious that Han Mahmud should be brought to heel, if possible without creating great trouble.

In 1838, Han Mahmud stretched his power beyond Müküs, Kavaş and Westan to include Hoşap Castle, which was the former seat of the Mahmudi principality, establishing his domain till the border of Iran.

Bedirhan Bey also sought to join forces with Han Mahmud, but the Ottoman forces prevented them from combining their forces; following their defeat, Han Mahmud withdrew towards Artos while Bedirhan Bey retreated towards Mount Cudi.

He was thereby one of the most powerful Kurdish emirs in the region and remained so against the Ottoman government and the neighbouring emirs of Hakkari, Hizan, Bohtan, Bitlis. His ascendancy also made him a notable figure in the reports of Osman Nuri Pasha and others who mentioned him. Contemporary accounts also indicate that Han Mahmud's growing influence was causing concern among neighbouring Kurdish rulers; in 1838, Bedirhan Bey was preparing forces to move against Han Mahmud's brother Abdül Ağa.

The Ottoman administration had a special anxiety about the status of the Hakkari emirs. While not the object of Ottoman military pursuits, they were often considered in rebellion, causing Ottoman officials to fear that they would aid Han Mahmud. Consequently, Osman Nuri Pasha also entertained a peaceful solution to the question of Han Mahmud without causing havoc at the border.

In his dispatch, Osman Nuri Pasha foresaw that the advance on Han Mahmud would cause him to apply for aid from the Hakkari emirs, or that the emirs of Hakkari, and if need be, Iran may be reinforced by such a movement. He then held that the matter of the Iranian frontier, as well as that of the Hakkari emirs, ought to be settled prior to the commencement of a great military operation.

An unforeseen turn of events occurred when the Hakkari and Cizre emirs advanced on Han Mahmud. Nurullah Bey (of Hakkari) and Miralay Bedirhan Bey (of Cizre), with Seyfeddin Bey, united in alliance and turned on Han Mahmud, breaking the precarious equilibrium he had endeavored to sustain with the Ottoman administration.

Han Mahmud had no anticipation of an attack, but united against him were the emirs of Cizre and Hakkari, who so harassed him. Consequently, he was forced to make peace with the Ottoman government and send his brother, Han Abd-Dirk, to Erzurum Müşiri Osman Nuri Pasha with letters of goodwill and overtures for peace.

Seyfeddin Bey and Nurullah Bey were motivated by separate incentives to join the anti the Han Mahmud camp. Seyfeddin Bey, who originated from Cizre and Botan, was still there when the Ottoman submission to Mir Muhammad forced him to flee to Baghdad. Bedirhan Bey, for his part, also was enabled to strengthen his position in Cizre and Botan, as struggling Seyfeddin Bey, devastated in mind, tried to regain his power by allying with him. Unlike Seyfeddin Bey, Nurullah Bey sought to cleanse the Hakkari emirate of its association with insurrection and to fortify his position against opponents within his own family, chiefly Süleyman Bey.

The agitation against Han Mahmud equally disturbed the dignitaries of the Porte. Osman Nuri Pasha regarded the behavior of the Cizre and Hakkari emirs as a betrayal of the Ottoman government's attempt to win over Han Mahmud. In his 18 September 1838 report, he mentioned that Seyfeddin Bey and Nurullah Bey had joined with Kurdish warriors and laid siege to Han Mahmud, and also asked who had given Seyfeddin Bey the mandate to act.

Also, Osman Nuri Pasha was misled by the irregularities pertaining to the Emirs of Cizre and Hakkari. He asked who had given Seyfeddin Bey the permission to engage in military activities, since the Cizre-Botan Emirate was beyond the authority of the pasha of Erzurum and was under that of the pasha of Sivas. However, Osman Nuri Pasha suggested that Han Mahmud's loyalty to the Ottoman government was pragmatically valuable, and that losing him might drive him to Iran.

When Osman Nuri Pasha heard that Hafız Mehmed Pasha had been already informed of the business, he desired to inquire into the matter. Han Mahmud was forced to yield again, pay tribute, and furnish men. Osman Nuri Pasha further required the delivery of one of Han Mahmud's brothers, to him or to the Van vali İshak Pasha as a hostage, an arrangement sanctioned by Han Mahmud.

Han Mahmud and the motives of those who opposed him are described more in detail in the reports of Muş Mutasarrıf Emin Pasha. Han Mahmud had made himself a local tyrant, and the solidity of his fortresses had baffled the Ottoman government in its endeavours to reduce him. For that reason Emin Pasha had thoughts of employing Seyfeddin Bey and Nurullah Bey against him, especially in case of further assistance being required.

Emin Pasha has also stated that the activities of Nurullah Bey and Seyfeddin Bey were only manifestations of ancient Kurdish emir feuding. Prior to this, Seyfeddin Bey was an iqta lord in Cizre and Botan; Bedirhan Bey had consolidated his power there since Seyfeddin's departure. Meanwhile, Nurullah Bey attempted to consolidate his power in the Hakkari emirate and distance it from the taint of rebellion. Hence, their cooperation against Han Mahmud was as much a reflection of this rivalry as it was a means of ensuring their own survival and fortifying their positions.

Emin Pasha also asserted that Han Mahmud had confiscated and looted the houses of the Armenian church around Lake Van, in particular those of the Akdamar and Çarpanak monasteries. These allegations were indeed part of the reports on Han Mahmud's doings, which the Ottoman government circulated.

By October 1838, Han Mahmud was already devastated by the Cizre and Hakkari emirs. He submitted to the Erzurum Governor Osman Nuri Pasha and Van Governor İshak Pasha and made his first appeal by informing them that he was submitting and requesting permission to go into exile. The Cizre and Hakkari emirs were, as Sivas Governor Hafız Mehmed Pasha reported on 21 November 1838, acting with the knowledge and consent of Bedirhan Bey and Hafız Mehmed Pasha. Hafız Mehmed Pasha then ordered Bedirhan Bey to stop fighting and retreat from the lands of Han Mahmud.

The Ottoman rulers also regarded Han Mahmud's role as strategically significant, not only because of his regional influence but also because of his closeness to the Iranian border. Hafız Mehmed Pasha claimed that Han Mahmud's army also inflicted damage and took loot in the lands of Cizre and Botan, but he commanded that the matter should be resolved without any more fighting.

Han Mahmud was at bay at the end of October 1838. The emirs of Hakkari and Cizre, according to the report of Hafız Mehmed Pasha, desired also to evacuate the country if Han Mahmud should come to Van and submit to them under the hand of İshak Pasha. Han Mahmud accepted terms and came to Van, and submitted to the Van pasha. He was then ordered to Erzurum with his brothers, Han Abdal and Seyfeddin Bey. He arrived at Erzurum on 4 November 1838, and was arrested with his brothers.

As Han Mahmud was imprisoned, his other brothers retreated to castles and fortresses in the area. Ottoman authorities decreed that Han Mahmud and his relatives be guarded, while they were seeking to contain rebellion and secure peace in the region.

Osman Nuri Pasha also demanded the submission of the other brothers of Han Mahmud. At his bidding, Han Mahmud dispatched his brother Abdürrezzak Bey to the closest Terlan Ağa to surrender. Abdürrezzak Bey was to be kept under Osman Nuri Pasha's protection and not be harmed. In the meantime preparations were made to preparations were made to take military action against the brothers of Han Mahmud who had fled to the fortresses. Van Governor İshak Pasha next moved against the remaining holdouts, who surrendered with little resistance.

But notwithstanding the orders regarding Han Mahmud's possession, some of his effects were afterwards pillaged by soldiers. Han Mahmud and the neighbouring Kurdish emirs had according to an Ottoman report retained a force of several thousand troops, at least in part paid for through taxes and other levies imposed upon the area. The report further stated that Han Mahmud's troops had run up significant debts, including funds for the pilgrimage.

After the repression of Han Mahmud's revolt, Ottoman agents looked for ways to reward those who had brought about his defeat. Van Governor İshak Pasha was proposed for a nişan and a promotion for driving Han Mahmud out of the region and taking Hoşap Castle. It was also on the request of Osman Nuri Pasha that Seyfeddin Bey be rewarded for his part in the defeat of the insurrection.

=== First exile ===
Following Han Mahmud's capture, Ottoman officials debated where he and his family should be sent. Hafız Mehmed Pasha considered it appropriate for Han Mahmud and his close relatives to be kept under control until they could be brought to Istanbul and undergo an "islah-ı nefs" process.

Osman Nuri Pasha subsequently reported that Han Mahmud had expressed regret and requested that his family and relatives not be kept in Istanbul. Instead he asked to be returned and settled with his family in a suitable place. Osman Nuri Pasha emphasized that Han Mahmud and his relatives possessed considerable influence among the tribes and near the Iranian frontier and that their resettlement therefore required particular consideration. The Ottoman authorities consequently considered different arrangements for Han Mahmud and his brothers. Osman Nuri Pasha proposed that Han Mahmud's brothers be kept in Istanbul while Han Mahmud and his family remained in Erzurum under supervision. He also suggested that Han Abdal and Abdürrezzak Bey could instead be settled in Edirne where their property and revenues could be administered by the local authorities.
