= Babanzade Rebellions (1806–1812) =

- Part of Timeline of Kurdish uprisings
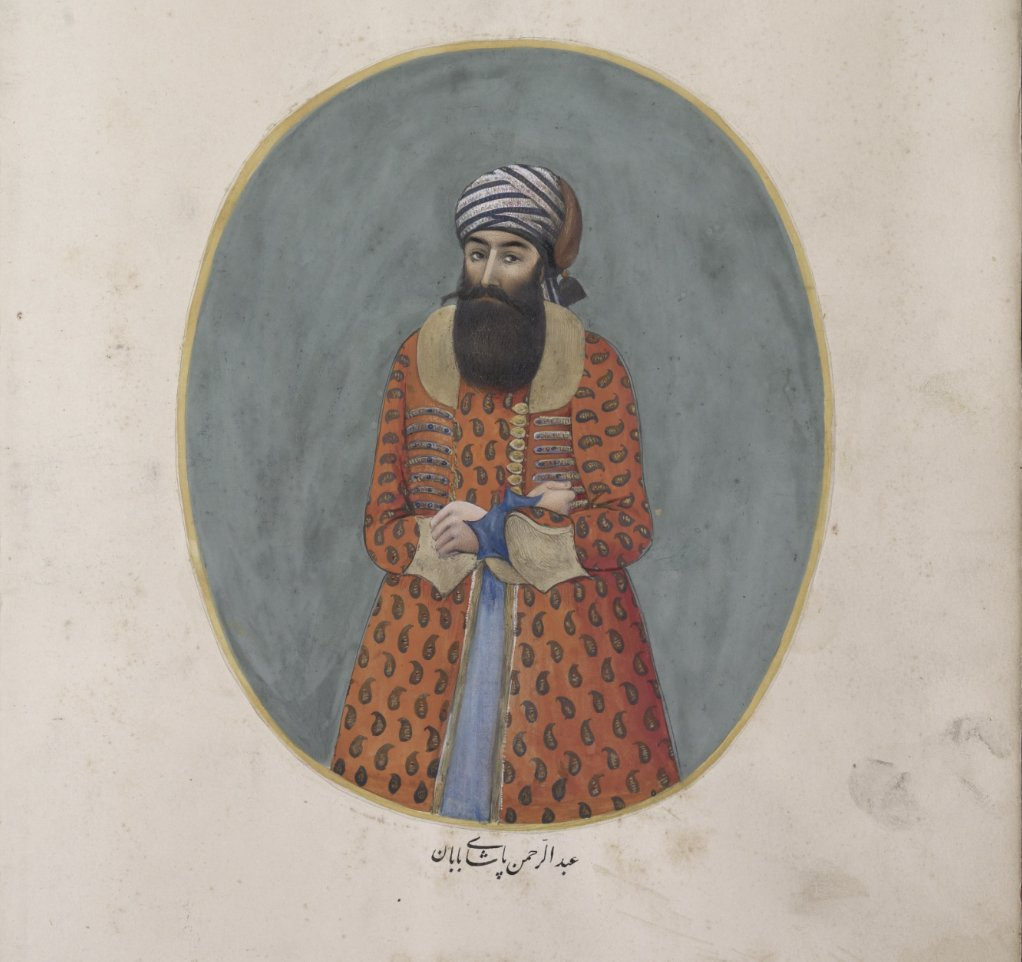
- Babanzâde Abdurrahman Pasha
Date	1806–1812
Location	Mosul, Sulaymaniyah
Result	Ottoman victory

Belligerents
Ottoman Empire	Baban Emirate

Commanders and leaders
Unknown	1806–1812; Babanzâde Abdurrahman Pasha 1812; Babanzâde Ahmed Paşa

The Babanzade Rebellions (1806–1812) was a Kurdish uprising against the Ottoman Empire that took place in 1806–1812. The revolt was led by Abdurrahman Pasha Baban and his nephew Babanzâde Ahmed Pasha. The reason for this revolt was because when Ibrahim Pasha, whom was Abdurrahman's uncle, died. The Ottoman authority placed a rival tribe member as Emir. After the initial rebellion instigated by Abdurrahman Pasha between 1806 and 1808 was suppressed, his nephew, Babanzade Ahmed Pasha rebelled in 1812 to avenge his uncle; this rebellion, also, was quickly suppressed.

== Background ==
In the early 19th century, Kurdistan was divided externally between the Ottoman Empire and Qajar Iran, and internally amongst several Kurdish emirates, the most important of which were Baban, Bahdinan, Bohtan and Hakkari. Although the Baban, Soran and Bahdinan emirates were indeed attached to the Baghdad Eyalet, Ottoman control over them was practically nominal; the emirs provided troops for military campaigns, in return for which they were exempt from taxation. Due to its strategic location on the Ottoman Iranian frontier, the Baban Emirate gradually came to play a more significant role in the politics of the Baghdad Eyalet from the late eighteenth century. At the capital of Sulaymaniyah as early as 1812, its population had already reached 4,000, and the combined population eight years later was already in the order of 10,000. The late eighteenth century Ottoman Persian wars significantly weakened the Baban emirs authority, allowing the Ottoman and Qajar states to interfere more in the emirate's internal affairs. Abdurrahman Pasha strengthened his rule in 1803 and vigorously campaigned to extend the emirate. After he had secured his internal position despite the hostility of the governors of Baghdad, he made overtures to the surrounding Kurdish emirates and to Mohammad Ali Mirza, governor of Kermanshah, for protection. Exploiting the growing hostility between the Ottoman Empire and Qajar Iran, Abdurrahman aligned with Mohammad Ali Mirza in the attack on the Ottoman governor of Baghdad in 1806. His lands were raided by armies of both Baghdad and Kermanshah loyalists multiple times in the subsequent years. After the last governor of Baghdad, Küçük Süleyman, was declared a rebel by the Ottoman government, Abdurrahman Pasha took the field against him with an army of about 20,000 men and deposed him in 1810. He had greatly stretched the domain of the Baban Emirate by 1813, the year he died, and was succeeded by his eldest son, Mahmut Pasha.

== Rebellions ==
The Babanzade Rebellions broke out after the death of Ibrahim Pasha, the founding leader of the city of Sulaymaniyah and a member of the Baban tribe, when the Ottoman administration, concerned about the tribe's growing power, appointed Halid Pasha from a rival tribe as emir. The rebellion, led by Ibrahim Pasha’s grandson Abdurrahman Pasha, lasted three years; it was suppressed in 1808, and Abdurrahman Pasha sought refuge in Iran. The second rebellion was that of Babanzade Ahmet Pasha. Initiated by Babanzade Ahmet Pasha, also a member of the same family, this rebellion was suppressed in 1812; it took place towards the end of the Russo-Turkish War (1806–1812) and during a period when the Ottoman Empire was grappling with the First Serbian Uprising. Some Kurdish historians consider this the first revolt with nationalist sentiments.

== See also ==
- Timeline of Kurdish uprisings

== Sources ==
- Meho, Lokman I. (2001). "The Kurds and Kurdistan: a general background" (PDF). p. 9. Archived from the original (PDF) on 2008-06-13.
- McDowall, David (2004). A Modern History of the Kurds. London: I.B. Tauris. p. 34. ISBN 978-1-85043-416-0.
- Türkmen, Gülay (2021). Under the Banner of Islam: Turks, Kurds, and the Limits of Religious Unity. Oxford University Press. p. 30. ISBN 978-0-19-751181-7.
- Altındağ, Nuray; Özçelik, Ali Onur (2022). Batı’nın Türkiye Üzerindeki Siyasi Etkisine Yönelik Milliyetçi Söylemler (in Turkish). Efe Akademi Yayınları. p. 71. ISBN 978-625-8121-96-4.
