= Shammar–Obaidi war (1814–1817) =

Conflict

Shammari–Obaidi conflict (1814–1817)
- Part of Mir Muhammad Rebellion and Arab revolts against the Ottoman Empire
Date	1814–1817
Location	Al-Jazira, Modern Day Syria and Iraq
Result	Al-Obeidi victory
Territorial changes	Tikrit, Mosul and Fallujah ceded to the Al-Obaidi

Belligerents
Emirate of Jabal Shammar; Ottoman Empire	Al-Obeidi; Al-Muntafiq Emirate (limited support)	Soran Emirate (Defensively)

Commanders and leaders
(Ottoman Empire) Bashar Agha † (Ottoman Empire) Ahmed Agha † (Emirate of Jabal Shammar) Safuq al-Jarba (WIA)	Sultan Obaid bin Jabr Al-Maktoum; Sa'adoun Al-Mustafa; Sheikh Khayyun al-Ubaid	Mir Muhammad

Casualties and losses
Heavy, Most weapons looted	Heavy	Moderate-Heavy

In the 1800s, after the Al Obeidi, were kicked out of Najd, by the First Saudi state, they had Quickly established a presence in the Al-Jazira, and started to rival the influential Shammar tribe, and tensions had spiked quickly, as the Ottoman Empire, had tried to keep peace and control over Iraq through military alliances and negotiations with both the Sultans of the tribe.

== The Conflict ==
Around 1814 The war had broken out between the Tribal Confederations, as the Conflict would consist of Raids and ambushes and counter raids and Ambushes, across all of the Jazira and northern Iraq, as the Ottomans would get involved in the Unrest, as they had struggled to contain it and keep the peace.

The War had continued for Several years even Causing the deaths of 2 Commanders, Bashar and Ahmed Agha, until The Shammaris had Agreed to a treaty of them Losing Fallujah, Mosul and Tikrit to the Al Obeidi tribe.

== Aftermath ==
The revolt had marked an important stage in Ottoman tribal politics, and the Rise of the Al Obeidi tribe in Northern Iraq, it also demonstrated the Continuing important of Tribal politics in Ottoman Iraq, where provincial authorities had Often Depended upon alliances with Major tribal Confederacys to maintain control.
