= Mir Muhammad Rebellion =

1830–38 Kurdish anti-Ottoman rebellion

- Part of Timeline of Kurdish uprisings
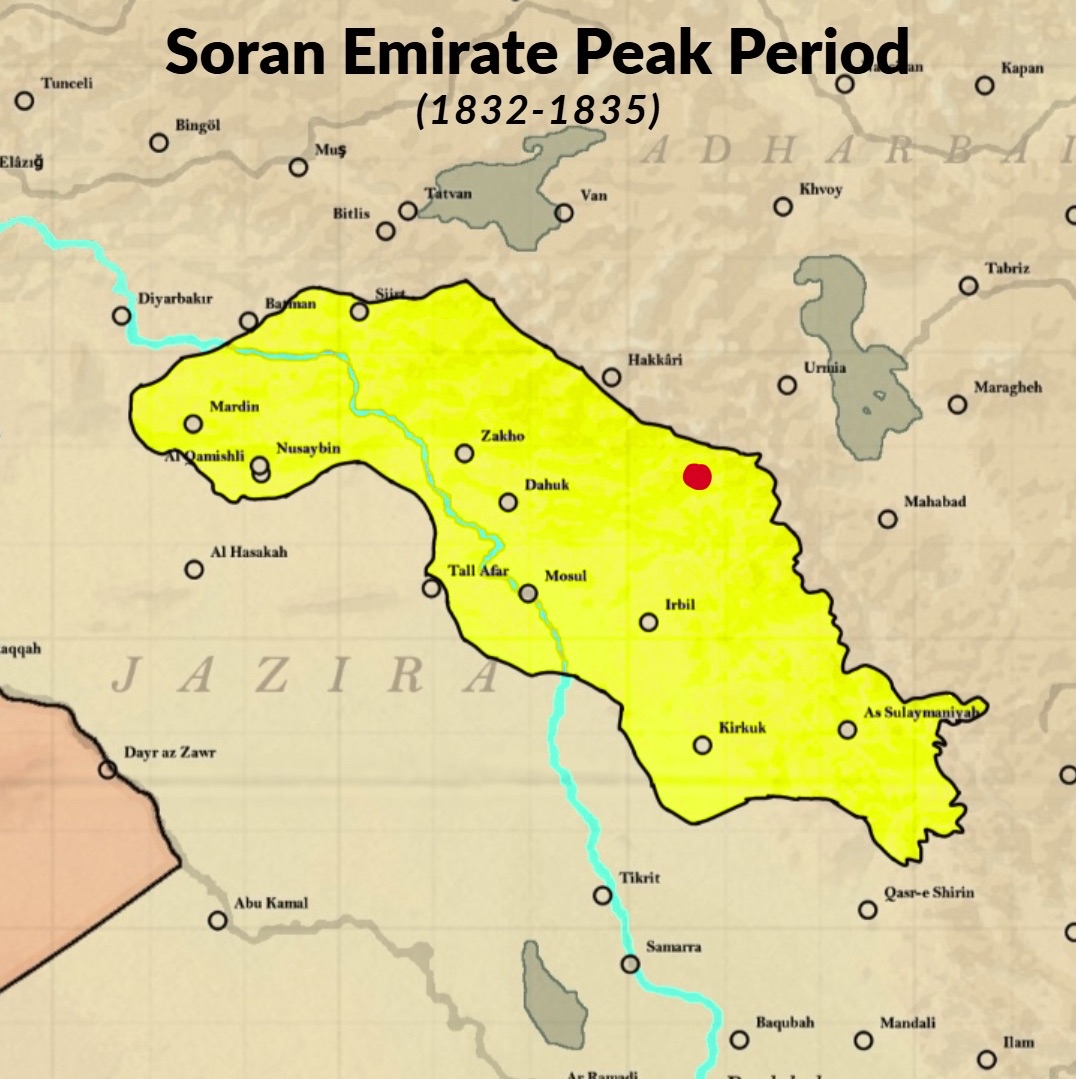
- Map of the Soran Emirate during the peak of Mir Muhammad’s rule (c. 1832–1835)
Date	1830–1838
Location	Upper Mesopotamia, Eastern Anatolia
Result	Ottoman victory: Mir Muhammad surrendered; Soran Emirate was reintegrated into the Ottoman provincial system

Belligerents
Ottoman Empire; (Ottoman Empire) Pashalik of Iraq	Soran Emirate

Commanders and leaders
(Ottoman Empire) Reşid Mehmed Pasha (1834–1836); (Ottoman Empire) Hafiz Mehmed Pasha (1837–1838); (Ottoman Empire) Ali Rıza Pasha the governor of Baghdad; (Ottoman Empire) Mehmet Pasha, the Governor of Mosul (Ottoman Empire) Governor of Shahrizor, Bayraktar Mehmet Pasha (1835) (Ottoman Empire) Mutasallim of Midyat (WIA) (1835): (Ottoman Empire) Bedir Khan Beg (1837–1838) (Note: Bedirhan Bey, realizing that he could not resist the Ottoman army, surrendered and submitted to the Ottomans in 1837, subsequently aligning himself with their side. Instead of being punished after his surrender, he was appointed as the administrator of Cizre-Bohtan, thereby being recognized by the Ottoman administration as a trusted local governor. Later, he actively supported the Ottoman army in the bloody military campaigns led by Hafız Mehmed Pasha in the Sinjar and Garzan regions. This cooperation was part of the Ottoman effort to consolidate control over the region. While Bedirhan Bey made no resistance whatsoever during Reşit Pasha's Eastern campaign, many ideological sources have produced imaginary scenarios of struggle and heroism, far removed from scientific historical methodology, in an attempt to mythologize Bedirhan Bey. All official records and minutes from that period, held in the Prime Ministry's Ottoman Archives, confirm our statements below. "Zekeriya Paşa hazretleri bendeleri tezkere-i mezkûrelerinde hâlâ nevâhi-i merkûme mütesellimi bulunan Bedirhan Bey'in Ferikân-ı kiramdan atüfetlü Hamdi Paşa bendeleri vâsıtasıyla müteveffâ Reşit Paşa'ya 'arz-ı dehâlet eylediğini beyân ve tezkir eylemiş iseler de hakikati şu vechledir ki müteveffâ-yı müşârün-ileyhin Cezire üzerine hareketinde mir-i müma-ileyh Mir Seyfettin ile bi'l-ittifak müteveffâ-yı müşârün-ileyhin refákatinde bulunan asâkir-i muntazama ve gayr-ı muntazamaya karşu durarak hayli dağdağa ve telâş virmiş ve birkaç gice müte'âkiben şebhün iderek müteveffâ-yı müşârün-ileyhi ziyade ıztırâba düşürmüş ve bil-âhire bi-lutfehu te'ala kuvve-i fâhire Devlet-i 'Aliyye'ye tâb-âver olamayarak 'ârfirârı irtikâb itmiş iseler dahi mir-i müma-ileyhüma tek durur malüleden olmayub bir aralık uygunsuzluğa tasaddi ideceklerini müteveffâ-yı müşârün-ileyhin vefâtından sonra âker-i mütehassıslarının Diyarbekir'e vürüd-ı 'abidânemde müma-ileyh Bedirhan Bey başına bir takım haşerât cem'iyle Bohtan havâlisinde gezinmekde olduğu tahkik olunarak def -ilgası içün müşârün-ileyh Hamdi Paşa bendeleri iki alay asâkir-i mansûre ve birtakım başıbozuk asker ile Cezire taraflarına ta'yin ve çâkerleri dahi Sincar üzerine 'azimetle tâli'-i nusrat-metâli'-i hazret-i padişâhîâ asârıyla Sincar ve Tel'afer eşkıyası te'dib ve ol-havâli teshir olunduktan sonra mir-i müma-ileyh kuvve-i fâhire-i saltanat seniyyeyi görerek başında bulunan cem'iyet ile müşârün-ileyh Hamdi Paşa bendelerine 'arzı dehâlet ve cem'iyet-i mezkûreden üç beş yüz adam tutub asâkir-i mansüre alaylarına virerek ibrâzı hüsn-i hidmet eylediğine binâ-en Ferik-i müşârün-ileyh bendeleri vâsıtasıyla taraf-ı çâkerânemden i'tâ-yı re'y ve emniyetle Diyarbekir'e celb ve te'min ve sâye-i ihsân-vâye-i hazret-i mülükânede binbaşılık rütbesiyle kâm-bin ve uhdesine birkaç mahallin5 mütesellimliği bil-ihâle i'âde kılınmış ve doğrusu her hâlde müedda-yı sadakati isbât eylemiş olduğundan mu'ahharan cânib-i seniyyü'l-cevânib Devlet-i Aliyye'den Miralaylık rütbe-i refi'ası ihsân ve ânın vâsıtasıyla dahi müma-ileyh Mir Seyfettin celb ile tarafı saltanat seniyyeden Kapucubaşılık rütbesi inayetiyle mazhar-ı eltâf cenâb-ı şehriyar dâraderban olmuş ve müşirlik merkürdan infisâl-i bendeganeme kadar ikisi dahi ibráz-ı levâzım rıza-cüyu ve sadakat ve hayli başlıca hidmetlerde dahi istihdam ile izhar-ı gayret etmişler.."); Helmuth Von Moltke (1838) (Note: "The letters of German Field Marshal Helmuth von Moltke, who participated in these wars from within the ranks of the Ottoman armies, are of a nature that reveals the true face of the war." "The following passage in the letter dated July 1838 brings to light the realities regarding the nature of the war.")	Mir Muhammad of Rawanduz (surrendered); Bedir Khan Beg (1830–1837)

Strength
(1836): Total 25,000+ or 26,000; Reşid Mehmed Pashas Forces; 5,000 Regulars; 2,000 Bashi-bazouk; The Forces of Mehmet Pasha, the Governor of Mosul; 4,000 Regulars; 10,000 Soldier; Ali Riza Pasha's Forces; Nearly 10,000 soldiers	30,000 (1835); 5,000 or 10,000

Casualties and losses
Unknown	Heavy
- Civilian casualties: See genocide of Yazidis by the Soran Emirate (1832-1834)

The Mir Muhammad Rebellion (Note: Turkish: Mir Muhammed İsyanı Kurdish: Şoreşa Mîr Mihemed) was a Kurdish uprising led by Mir Muhammad of Rawanduz between 1830 and 1838 against the Ottoman Empire. Mir Muhammad, seeking autonomy and inspired by Muhammad Ali of Egypt, launched a campaign to unify Kurdish tribes and expand his influence in Upper Mesopotamia. The rebellion coincided with the weakening of Ottoman central authority, allowing him to challenge imperial rule until the Ottomans suppressed the uprising in 1835–1838. Following his surrender, the Soran Emirate was dissolved, and Kurdish regions were reincorporated into the Ottoman administrative structure.

== Background ==
Mir Muhammad of Rawanduz, emir of the Soran Emirate, emerged as a dominant regional figure in the early 1830s. Inspired by the example of Muhammad Ali of Egypt, he aimed to establish a semi-independent Kurdish state within the Ottoman Empire. He forcefully subdued neighboring Kurdish tribes and positioned himself as a significant local ruler. This period saw increasing political awareness among Kurdish notables, coupled with a growing desire for autonomy.

Taking advantage of declining imperial control, Mir Muhammad expanded his influence into Sulaymaniyah, Erbil, and Mosul. During this campaign, he briefly allied with Bedir Khan Beg of Cizre, attempting to unite Kurdish leaders in opposition to the Ottomans.

According to archival Ottoman sources, Mir Muhammad's territorial control included, beyond the Soran region itself, large portions of the Shahrizor region, including Koy Sanjaq, Harir, Köprü, and parts of Erbil. To the north, his domain extended into Cizre and parts of Bohtan, and by 1835 it also encompassed sections of the Bahdinan and Baban Kurdish principalities.

In 1832-1833, the Ottoman Empire faced simultaneous threats, including the Wahhabi uprising in Arabia and the revolt of Muhammad Ali of Egypt, whose influence extended into Syria and Anatolia. During this turbulent period, the Governor of Baghdad launched a major military campaign against Mir Muhammad, Emir of Soran, whose influence was steadily growing. In 1248 AH (1832-33), the governor marched with a large force in an attempt to suppress him.

However, the campaign failed. Several factors contributed to this failure, including Mir Muhammad's strong relations with Iran and his occupation of parts of the Baban region. The Governor of Baghdad was unable to subdue him and ultimately achieved no decisive result.

Faced with growing difficulties on multiple fronts, the Ottoman central administration opted to avoid further military escalation. Instead, it turned to diplomacy. In an effort to secure Mir Muhammad's loyalty and bring him nominally under imperial control, the Ottoman government granted him the honorary title of "Pasha." A peace agreement was reached, and Ottoman troops withdrew from the region.

In the aftermath, Mir Muhammad emerged even stronger, consolidating his position and expanding his authority by seizing control of the Amadiya district.

== Rebellion and Ottoman Response ==
Having breathed a sigh of relief with the Treaty of Kütahya in May 1833, the Ottoman Empire decided to launch a campaign in Kurdistan to suppress the Mir Muhammad rebellion and put an end to the autonomous Kurdish principalities.

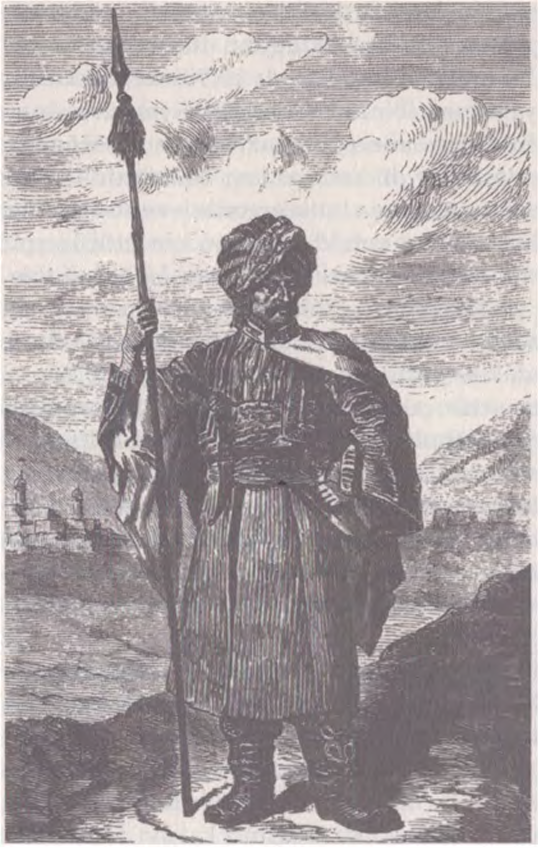
A Kurdish chieftain

In November 1832, at the Battle of Konya, Grand Vizier Reşid Mehmed Pasha was defeated and captured by Ibrahim Pasha of Egypt, the son of the Egyptian governor Muhammad Ali of Egypt. He was released two months later at Kütahya but was subsequently dismissed from the grand vizierate. In 1834 he was appointed governor of Sivas and tasked with suppressing the rebellion of the Soran ruler Mir Muhammad and bringing the Kurdish principalities in the region under Ottoman authority.

Another development that facilitated Ottoman action against Mir Muhammad was the changing regional situation in the Baban area. The region, which had previously been occupied by Iranian forces due to earlier disputes between the Baban rulers and the Ottomans, was eventually evacuated by Iran. With the withdrawal of Iranian officials from Sulaymaniyah and the end of effective Iranian presence in Ottoman Kurdistan, it became clear that Iran would not provide assistance to the Soran emir. This development significantly strengthened the Ottoman position and removed an important potential source of support for Mir Muhammad.

By early 1835, the Ottoman authorities had begun preparations for a military campaign against the Soran Emirate. In response, Mir Muhammad concentrated his forces near Mosul. According to Ottoman archival reports, in February 1835 he positioned approximately 10,000 soldiers in the district of Navgir, located about four hours from Mosul, in anticipation of an Ottoman advance.

Mir Muhammad's expansion into neighboring territories also alarmed several local Kurdish elites. Notables from Amadiya sent a petition to the Sivas governor Reşid Mehmed Pasha, declaring their loyalty to the Ottoman Sultan and complaining about what they described as the oppression of Mir Muhammad. The petition bore the seals of thirty-three prominent figures, including tribal leaders, aghas, and religious authorities from Amadiya, Zakho, and Akre.

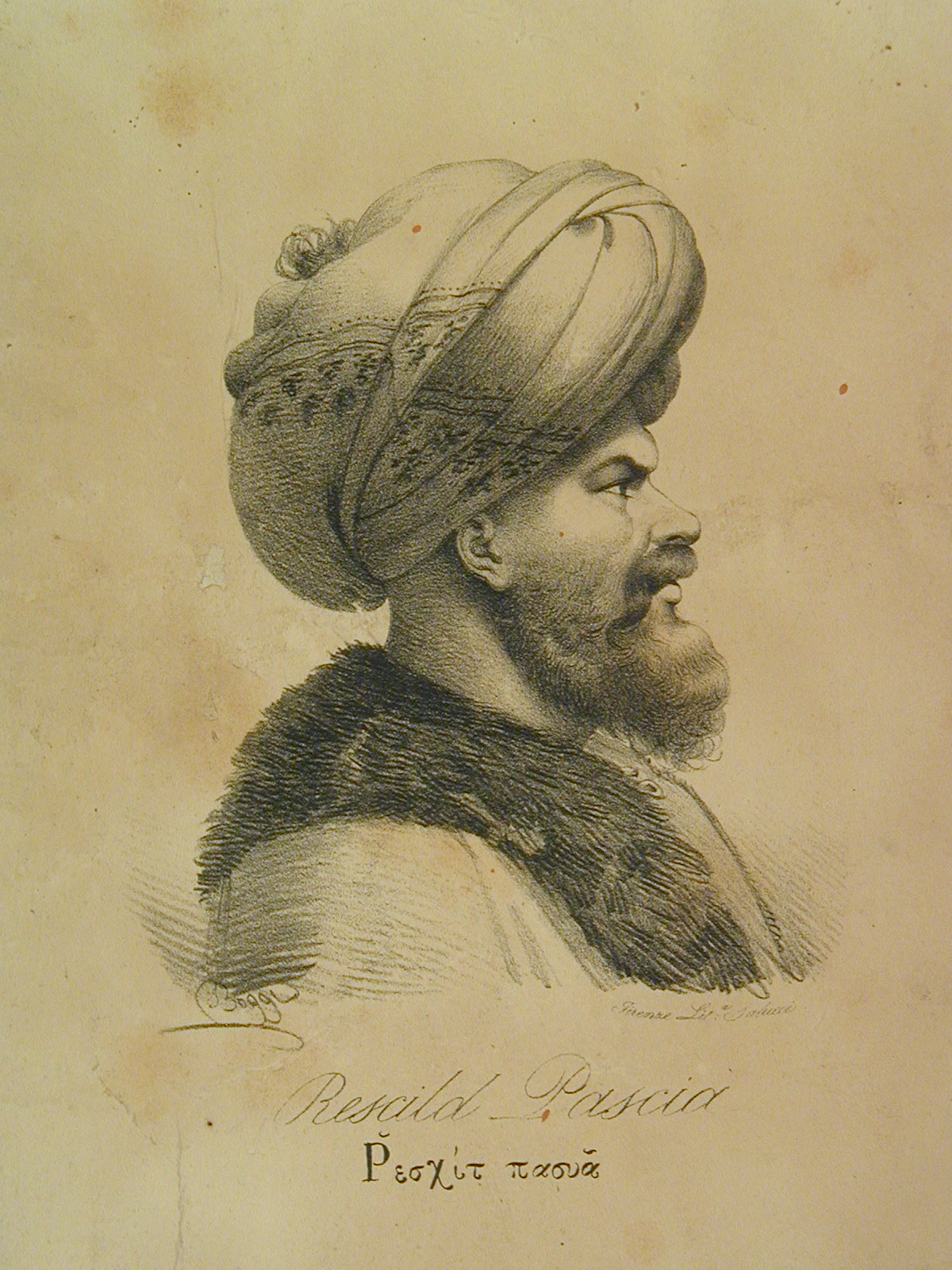
Portrait of Reşid Mehmed pasha by Giovanni Boggi.

In response, Reşid Mehmed Pasha wrote a letter dated 31 March 1835 to the Amadiya notables.

“Siz mademki Devlet-i Aliye kulluğunu iltizam etmişsiniz, malum olduğu üzere, bizim ve âlemlerin velinimeti olan padişahımız efendimiz hazretlerinin Memalik-i Mahruse-i İslamiyye’de (Osmanlı İslam ülkesinde) zulüm ve düşmanlığa asla rızası yoktur. Bu surette sizlerin dahi bu şekilde uğramış olduğunuz zulüm ve düşmanlığa Zat-ı Şahanelerinin rızası yoktur. Her şekilde muhafazanızın icra olunacağı açıktır.

Amidiye Sancağı Bağdat Eyaleti dahilinde olup, Bağdat Valisi hazretlerinin dahi o bölgenin Valisi olarak bu şekil zulüm ve yoldan çıkmaya asla rıza göstermeyecekleri aşikardır.

Şu anda Saltanat-ı Seniyye tarafından Bağdat tarafına hayli Asakir-i Muntazama-i Muhammediye memur edilip gönderilmiştir. Bu askerlerin gönderilmesi Revanduz Beyi gibi hainlerin tedip ve terbiyeleri ile cümle ahali ve fukaranın emniyet ve istirahatları hususundan ibarettir.

Mesele, Bağdat Valisi tarafına yazılmış, Saltanat-ı Seniyye’ye dahi arz ve inha kılınmıştır. Bağdat Valisi hazretlerine yazılan tahriratımız tarafınıza gönderilmiş olup, elinize geçtiğinde tahriratımızı alıp içinizden ileri gelenlerden dört beş kişi kalkıp doğru Bağdat’a giderek, Vali hazretlerine yazıları ibraz ediniz.

Halinizi ifade ettiğiniz surette haklarınızda her şekilde müsaade ve uğramış olduğunuz düşmanlık ve hasardan sizi muhafaza buyuracakları aşikardır.”

English Translation:

“Since you have declared yourselves servants of the Ottoman State, it is well known that our sovereign, the Sultan our benefactor and the benefactor of all does not in any way tolerate oppression or hostility within the protected domains of Islam (the Ottoman lands). Therefore, the oppression and hostility that you state you have suffered cannot have the approval of His Imperial Majesty. It is evident that your protection will be ensured in every respect.

The district of Amadiya is included within the Baghdad province, and it is equally clear that the Governor of Baghdad, as the governor responsible for that region, will never tolerate such oppression or misconduct.

At present, a considerable number of regular Ottoman troops have been dispatched by the imperial government to the Baghdad region. The purpose of sending these troops is to discipline and punish rebels such as the Bey of Rawanduz and to ensure the security and well-being of the general population and the poor.

The matter has been written to the Governor of Baghdad and has also been reported to the imperial government. The correspondence addressed to the Governor of Baghdad has been sent to you as well. When it reaches you, take this document and send four or five of your leading men to Baghdad to present the letters to the governor.

Once you present your situation in this manner, it is evident that permission will be granted in your favor and that you will be protected from the hostility and harm you have suffered.”

Reşid Mehmed Pasha concluded his letter by stating that those who remained loyal to the Ottoman state would be rewarded, and he directed the Amadiya notables to bring their complaints before the governor of Baghdad.

Mir Muhammad's expansion did not only alarm the elites of Amadiya. After the territories of Cizre and Bohtan had largely come under the authority of Seyfeddin Bey, the rulers of nearby districts such as Şirvan and Garzan also became concerned that Mir Muhammad's campaigns might threaten their own domains.

Unable to stop the advance of the Rawanduz emir directly, Ottoman authorities attempted to strengthen relations with regional leaders in order to limit the further spread of his influence. In this context, the ruler of Şirvan, Said Bey, sent a letter in Arabic to Reşid Mehmed Pasha, stating that Mir Muhammad had occupied Cizre but that the local rulers had not submitted to him and had remained in their positions.

The Rawanduz affair also created tensions between the Ottoman provincial authorities. The governors of Sivas and Baghdad both became involved in the question of how to deal with Mir Muhammad. The governor of Baghdad argued that the problem could be resolved under his authority and expressed discomfort with the intervention of the Sivas governor.

The situation was complicated by the fact that Mir Muhammad's campaigns extended into territories belonging to both administrations. While regions such as Soran, Baban and Behdinan were considered part of the Baghdad province, districts including Cizre, Bohtan, Garzan and Şirvan fell under the jurisdiction of the Sivas governorship. As a result, correspondence from both provinces was brought before the imperial council (Meclis-i Şura) for discussion.

Ultimately, the opinion of the Baghdad governor prevailed. Responsibility for the campaign was entrusted to the governor of Mosul, Mehmed Pasha, and the forces assembled under Reşid Mehmed Pasha were ordered to proceed to Mosul before advancing against the Rawanduz emir.

In the spring of 1835, while the governor of Baghdad was unable to organize a direct campaign against the Soran emir, the governor of Sivas, Reşid Mehmed Pasha, advanced into the Garzan region, an area largely inhabited by Yazidi Kurds.

In July 1835, Mir Muhammad Pasha of Rawanduz continued his efforts to expand his influence by encouraging tribal uprisings in the regions of Mardin, Cizre, and Bohtan. It is reported that the tribes of Mardin appealed to Rawanduz for assistance against Reşid Mehmed Pasha, prompting Reşid Pasha to march into the region and suppress the uprising after heavy clashes, during which 200 rebels were reportedly killed.

Following the Ottoman advance, Rawanduzi was forced to withdraw some of his supporters from the area; however, he soon succeeded in causing instability once again in Cizre and Bohtan, where he maintained strong tribal connections and was capable of gathering between 8,000 and 10,000 fighters. Troops were also dispatched to Siirt and Şirvan in support of allied groups.

The continued uprisings organized by tribes and beys aligned with Rawanduz alarmed the Ottoman authorities, and preparations began toward the end of 1835 for a larger campaign against Mir Muhammad. According to the planned operation, Cizre would first be secured in order to protect the Diyarbakır region and prevent further incursions from Rawanduz, thereby ensuring the security of the Diyarbakır Eyalet and blocking any advance by Rawanduzlu from Cizre into Anatolia.

Meanwhile, upon learning of Reşid Pasha’s military preparations, Mir Muhammad attempted to further destabilize the region. Tribal forces supported by approximately 7,000 men carried out a night raid on villages near Midyat, during which the mutasallim of Midyat was lured into a trap. Between fifty and sixty of his men were killed, while he himself was wounded in three places and narrowly escaped.

A letter dated 12 August 1835 from the chiefs of the Omeriyan tribe in Mardin to the Rawanduz emir reported that Reşid Pasha had taken control of the Garzan region and the area known as Yazidkhan, had reached an agreement with tribes in the Diyarbakır region, and had gathered a considerable number of troops before arriving in Diyarbakır. The letter also suggested that some tribes might change sides if the Ottoman commander advanced toward the Mardin area.

Reşid Mehmed Pasha provided the following information regarding the Garzan campaign in a report dated 1 November 1835:

“Malum-u Ali buyrulduğu üzere Garzan taraflarından dönüşümde, Garzan toprağında ‘Dağ kavmi’ diye tabir olunan ‘Ekrad-ı Lain’ tekrar direniş yoluna sapmışlardır.

Tedip ve terbiyeleri amacıyla Muş Mütesellimi saadetli Emin Paşa kulları üç bin kadar süvari ile Muş tarafından, dört bin kadar ulufeli ve ulufesiz piyade ve süvari de Diyarbakır tarafından tayin olunmuştu.

Merkum askerler söz konusu kavim üzerine iki koldan yürüyüp birkaç defa muharebe gerçekleşmiş, iki üç köy üzerine hücum ile bir takım idam ve izale olunmuş, ova köyleri alınmıştır.

Bunun üzerine merhum kavim aman dilemiş, bulundukları bölge sarp ve dağlık olduğundan rehinleri alınarak rai verilmiş ve şimdilik gaile böylece bitirilmiştir.”

English Translation:

“As previously reported, upon my return from the Garzan region, the people described as the ‘mountain tribe’, referred to as the ‘accursed Kurds’, once again resorted to rebellion.

In order to discipline them, the Muş mutasarrıfı Emin Pasha dispatched approximately three thousand cavalry from the Muş region, while about four thousand salaried and irregular infantry and cavalry were assigned from the Diyarbakır side.

These forces advanced against the said group in two columns and several engagements took place. Two or three villages were attacked, some executions and expulsions were carried out, and the villages in the plains were taken under control.

After these events, the aforementioned group asked for mercy. As the region they occupied was mountainous and difficult to access, hostages were taken and a settlement was reached, and the matter was for the time being brought to an end.”

According to Reşid Mehmed Pasha's report, Ottoman forces from Muş and Diyarbakır were deployed against the Garzan tribes after renewed resistance in the region. Approximately three thousand cavalry under the Muş mutasarrıfı Emin Pasha and around four thousand infantry and cavalry units from the Diyarbakır region participated in the campaign. The Ottoman troops advanced in two columns and several engagements took place, during which a number of villages were attacked and brought under control.

Following these clashes, the local groups reportedly sought terms and hostages were taken as guarantees, temporarily bringing the conflict in the region to an end.

In the same report, Reşid Mehmed Pasha further informed the imperial government that Cizre remained under the control of the Rawanduz emir and that districts such as Midyat, Siirt, and Şirvan continued to face pressure from his forces. He emphasized that order in the Diyarbakır province could not be fully restored until Cizre was brought under Ottoman control.

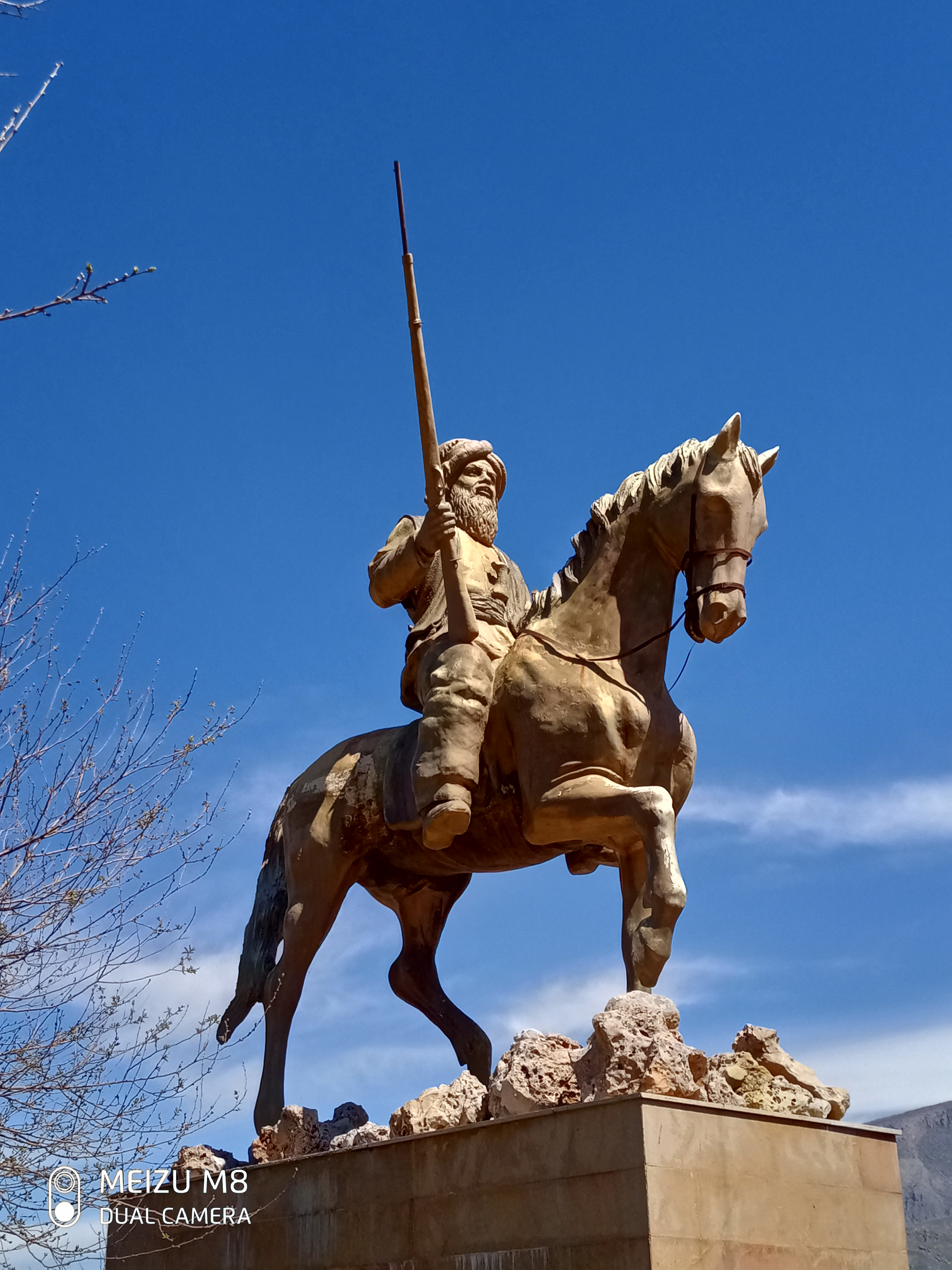
The statue of Mir Muhammad Pasha of Rewanduz, located in Rawandiz.

Reşid Mehmed Pasha's military operations gradually strengthened Ottoman influence in the Kurdish regions. He regarded the capture of Cizre as essential for restoring stability in the Diyarbakır province. However, by the end of 1835 further operations were slowed by severe winter conditions as well as the ongoing Egyptian-Ottoman conflict.

In a report dated 14 February 1836, Reşid Mehmed Pasha warned that the revolt of Mehmed Ali Pasha of Egypt had begun to affect the political situation in Iraq and Kurdistan. According to the report, Mehmed Ali Pasha, whose intention was to seize Baghdad, had gathered his forces in Aleppo and occupied the area known as Dir, located approximately seventy to eighty hours from Baghdad.

Although Reşid Pasha considered a direct Egyptian advance on Baghdad unlikely, he noted that the situation could still encourage unrest in the region. When news arrived that Ibrahim Pasha was preparing to march toward Urfa, Reşid Pasha was forced to end his campaign against the Yazidi groups and move toward Urfa.

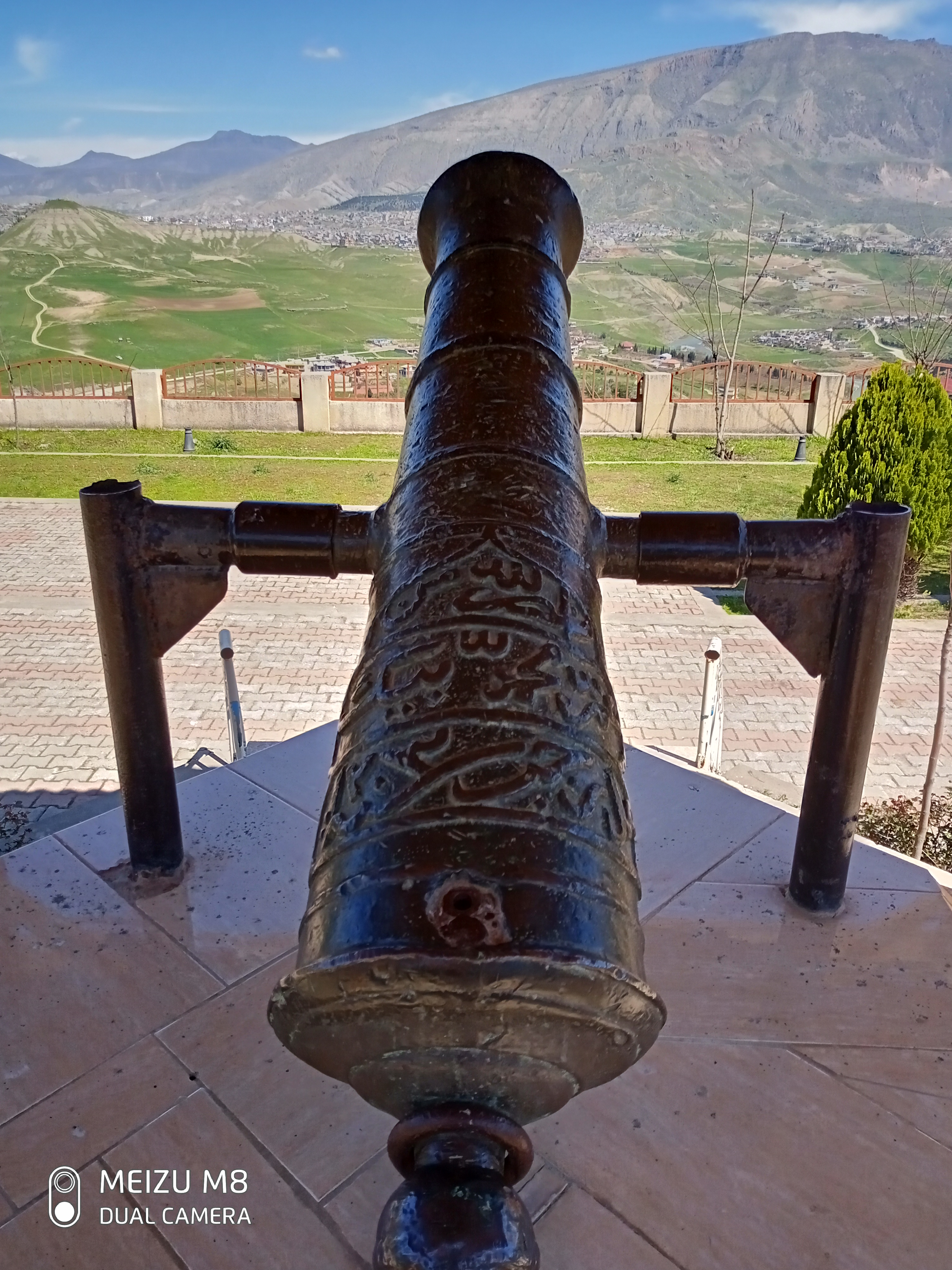
The cannon, made by Master Receb(Receb Mir Ahmed), located in present-day Rawandiz.

In the spring of 1836, Reşid Mehmed Pasha began preparations for a campaign against Cizre, which remained under the control of Mir Seyfeddin, a local ruler aligned with the Rawanduz emir. Before advancing on the city, Ottoman forces carried out operations in the Diyarbakır region and subdued several local leaders, including the Zerkî beys Recep, Timur, and Hüseyin in the Silvan area.

Ottoman forces subsequently marched on Cizre and succeededd in capturing the city from Mir Seyfeddin, who had been acting in alliance with the Rawanduz emir. In letters sent by Reşid Pasha's sons, Mir Muhammad of Rawanduz was informed that Cizre had been taken by Ottoman forces.

“Cizre dedikleri mahal oldukça çetin, köy ve kaleleri ziyadesiyle sağlam ve ahalisi cesaretli ve cengaver olarak bu hususta pek çok zahmet ve meşakkat çekilmiş ise de Allah’a hamdolsun ki Hazreti Padişah sayesinde ele geçirilmiştir. Bunun üzerine sair aşiretler dahi dehalet ve itaat etmiş olduklarından Revanduz maslahatının tamamlanması sırası gelmiştir.”

English Translation:

“The place called Cizre is extremely difficult; its villages and fortresses are very strong, and its inhabitants are brave and warlike. Although much hardship and effort were endured in this matter, thanks be to God it has been captured with the support of His Majesty the Sultan. As other tribes have also sought refuge and declared their obedience, the time has now come to complete the matter of Rawanduz.”

After the fall of Cizre, Ottoman forces advanced southward and clashes continued in the Zakho region with forces loyal to the Rawanduz emir. Following the capture of the city, several Amadiya leaders also began to submit to the Ottoman army. With the arrival of the governor of Mosul, Mehmed Pasha, it was planned to launch a coordinated offensive against the Rawanduz emir from three directions by the forces of Sivas, Mosul, and Baghdad.

Reşid Mehmed Pasha also provided further information about the situation in Cizre in a letter dated 7 May 1836 written to the imperial government.

“Cizre Bölgesi Kürtleri geçen sene gördüğümüz Kürtlere benzemeyip meğer bunlar onlardan birkaç kat fena bir milletmiş. İşte, Cizre Beyi Seyfeddin Bey dedikleri hainin ele geçirilen sarayında bulunup yazımıza iliştirilerek tarafınıza gönderilen Arapça evraklarından da anlaşılmaktadır.

Şöyle ki; buralarda “Seyyid” ve “Şeyh” diye tabir edilen bir takım fesatçılar olup daima dağlarda gezip, tümüyle beyaz elbise giyerek, her nereye gitseler bazıları “Ca-i bi Şeyhna”, bazıları da “Şeyh-i ma hat” diyerek kadın ve erkek ellerini öpüp eteklerine sarılıyorlar.

Bunlar kendi kabilelerine her ne söylerlerse, yani “falan ile muharebe ediniz ve filan ile barışınız!” dedikleri anda da böylece hareket ediyorlar. Şu şekilde ki; faraza iki aşiret birbiriyle savaşmaya başlayıp iki taraftan da tüfekler kullanılıyor iken, bu şeyhlerden biri aralarına girdiğinde derhal tüfek kesilip yerli yerine giriyorlar. Özetle bunların halleri hiçbir millette görülmemiştir.

İşte mezkûr evrakın dahi hain merhum Seyfeddin Bey’in bu günlerde dağlarda olan şeyhinden olduğu meseleye vakıf olanlardan tahkik olunmuş ve tarafınıza gönderilmiştir. Hain merkuma bu derece hürmet ve tabiiyet etmeleri güya Halid bin Velid atalarından olduğu içindir. Lakin öyle midir değil midir orasını bilemem. Huda bilir ki bunlar hutbelerinde bile padişahımız efendimizin adını yad etmezler.

Bir takımı Revanduzlunun, bu havali civanları da merhum Seyfeddin’in ismini anıyorlar. İşte her ne kadar tafsil olunsa bu haşeratın hareket ve halleri tarif olunmaz.”

English Translation:

“The Kurds of the Cizre region are unlike the Kurds we encountered last year; indeed they appear to be several times worse than them. This is also evident from the Arabic documents found in the palace of the traitor known as Seyfeddin Bey of Cizre, which have been attached to our report and sent to you.

In these lands there are certain agitators referred to as ‘sayyids’ and ‘sheikhs’. They wander constantly in the mountains wearing entirely white garments, and wherever they go people greet them with phrases such as ‘our sheikh has come’, kissing their hands and clinging to their robes.

Whatever these figures say to their tribes whether to wage war against one group or make peace with another is immediately obeyed. For instance, even when two tribes are engaged in battle and firearms are being used, if one of these sheikhs intervenes, the fighting ceases at once. In short, their manner of influence is unlike anything seen among other peoples.

The documents mentioned above have been investigated and confirmed to belong to the sheikh associated with the late Seyfeddin Bey. The great respect and obedience shown to him is attributed to the belief that he descends from Khalid ibn al-Walid, though whether this is true or not I cannot say. God knows that they do not even mention the name of our sovereign in their sermons.

Some followers of the Rawanduz ruler in this region also invoke the name of the late Seyfeddin. No matter how much one attempts to describe them, the conduct and actions of these people are difficult to fully portray.”

The rulers of Cizre belonged to the Azizi family, who, according to the Şerefname, claimed descent from the famous Islamic commander Khalid ibn al-Walid. For this reason they were often referred to among Kurdish groups as the “Halidi” lineage. At the time Cizre was under the authority of the Rawanduz emir, its ruler was Seyfeddin Bey, known among Kurds as Mir Sevdin.

Following the capture of Cizre by Ottoman forces, Seyfeddin Bey fled and sought refuge with the governor of Baghdad, Ali Pasha. In his absence, Reşid Mehmed Pasha appointed his relative Bedir Khan Bey as the Ottoman governor (mütesellim) of Cizre. In the following years Bedir Khan, supported by the trust of Reşid and later Hafiz Pasha, would gradually emerge as one of the most powerful Kurdish rulers in the region.

Although Seyfeddin Bey was later pardoned and allowed to return to Cizre, he was unable to reclaim his former authority. During the later conflicts in the region, particularly those involving Mir Muhammad, Bedir Khan Bey continued to exercise power in Cizre and at times acted as Seyfeddin's deputy when the latter was absent from the city.

An imperial force under Reşid Mehmed Pasha was dispatched to suppress the uprising and reassert control. While Mir Muhammad initially resisted successfully, the decisive 1835 campaign led to the capture of Rawanduz. Pressured militarily and politically, Mir Muhammad retreated to the mountains and later surrendered.

According to historian Wadie Jwaideh, a decisive blow to Mir Muhammad's authority came when his own religious advisor, Molla Muhammad Xati, issued a fatwa declaring that anyone who fought against the army of the Caliph was an infidel and that their wives were no longer lawful to them. This ruling deeply demoralized his forces and contributed to his eventual surrender. The Ottomans also offered him assurances of protection and status in case of capitulation, further encouraging his decision.

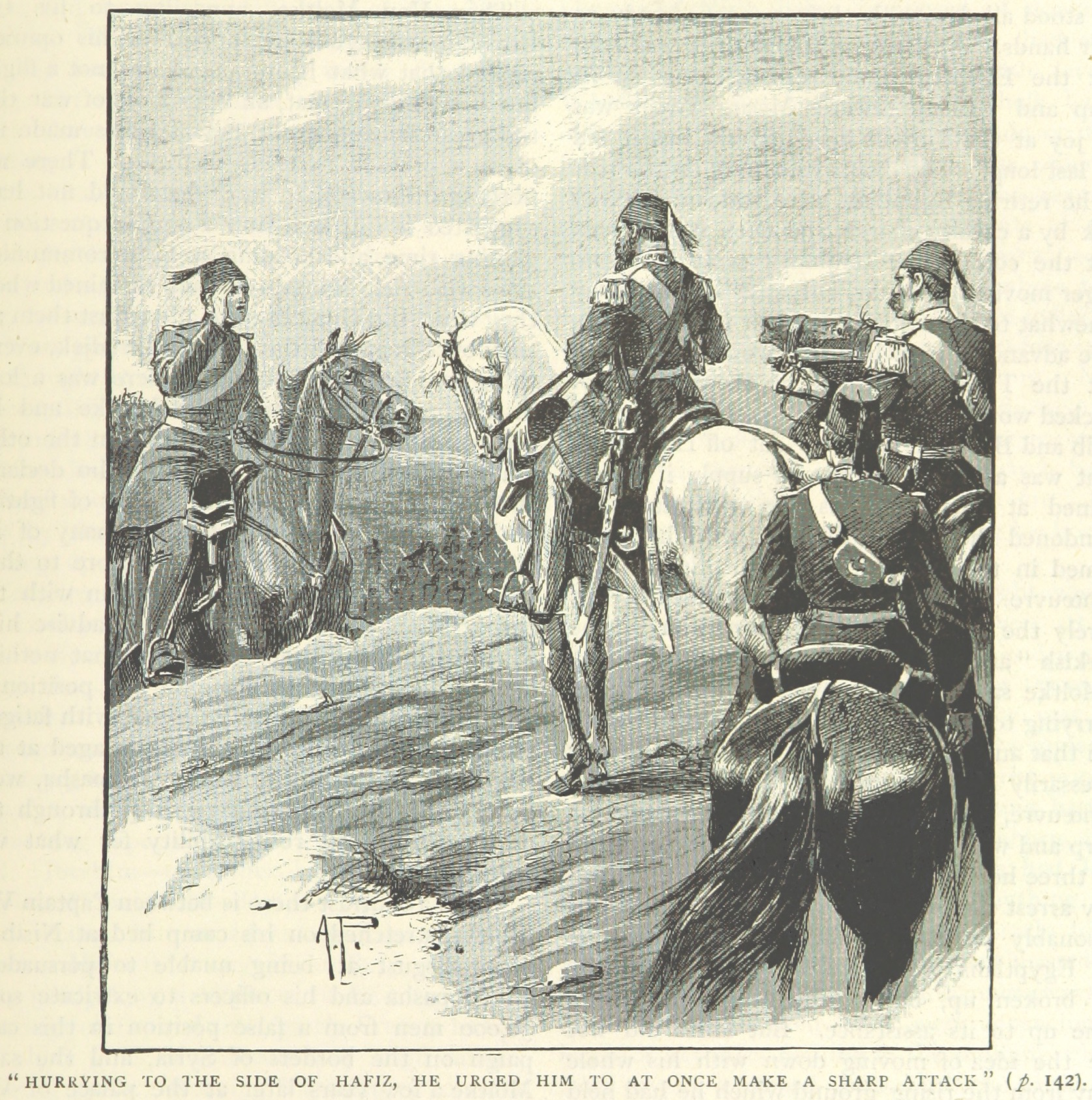
Helmuth von Moltke (left) advises Hafiz Mehmed Pasha

Following the death of Reşid Mehmed Pasha from cholera in 1836, he was succeeded by Hafiz Mehmed Pasha, a well-educated officer with a dual mission: to continue suppressing unrest in Kurdistan and to monitor the forces of Muhammad Ali Pasha stationed in Syria. Upon assuming command, Hafiz Mehmed Pasha intensified Ottoman military operations in the region. Several Kurdish leaders including those from Rawanduz and surrounding districts such as Sinjar, Akçadağ, and Alacadağ continued to resist for a time, but were eventually subdued through sustained campaigns. Contemporary accounts report that roughly 15,000 people were killed or wounded during these operations, including both rebels and civilians living under their administration. Around 4,000 non-combatants, among them women, children, and the elderly, were taken captive, and an estimated 6,000 families were forcibly resettled near Diyarbakır. Ottoman commanders offered monetary rewards for proof of slain rebels, reportedly paying 200 kuruş for a severed head and 100 kuruş for a severed hand or foot, further illustrating the severity of the campaign. Despite this, Hafiz Pasha maintained an outwardly courteous attitude toward European observers and frequently attended military band performances of European compositions. In the summer of 1837, during a harsh military campaign against the Yazidis in the Sinjar region, Hafiz Pasha also dispatched Mehmet Hamdi Pasha to advance on Cizre. Facing pressure, Bedir Khan Beg chose not to resist and declared loyalty to the Ottoman state. As a result, he was appointed as the provincial governor of the Bohtan Emirate centered in Cizre.

Later that year, Hafiz Mehmed Pasha launched further violent operations against the Yazidis of Sinjar and Tel Afar, resulting in heavy casualties. In May 1838, with the support of Bedir Khan, he seized the fortified castle of Gurkel from local chief Said Bey of Hacıbehram. In the following months (June-July 1838), the Yazidi populations of the Garzan region were also subdued by Ottoman forces. These campaigns not only aimed to crush local resistance, but also to preempt potential Kurdish uprisings in the event of a future confrontation with Muhammad Ali of Egypt.

After the Cizre region, the Ottoman armies marched towards Garzan, and faced fierce Kurdish resistance. The letters of Helmuth von Moltke, who participated in these battles as part of the Ottoman army, provide an account of the fighting and its consequences.

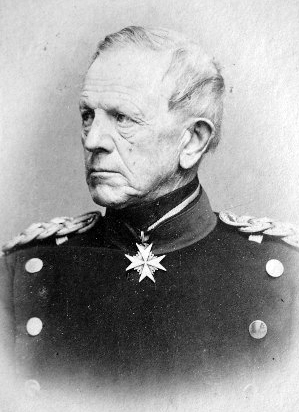
Generalfeldmarschall Helmuth von Moltke

The following passage from a letter dated July 1838 describes the conduct of the campaign:

Another military operation became necessary. A large number of irregular soldiers, together with fourteen companies, were sent to surround a very steep hill from all four sides. It took five hours to climb the hill, and during this time the regular troops suffered sixteen dead and around sixty wounded. Even the women were firing upon the regular troops. A Kurdish woman struck and killed a soldier with a dagger. Once they reached the top, the soldiers, driven mad with rage, shot everyone who resisted them. Some 400-500 Kurds were killed. About 50 women, while being taken away, threw themselves to their deaths from the cliff above.

The Pasha had not wanted us to participate in this operation. I confess that I found this quite appropriate. There is nothing to envy about this war; from beginning to end, it is disgusting and horrifying. In addition to thousands of animals, they took 600 prisoners. Half of the prisoners are women with small children. A boy of six or seven years of age had been shot; we have now removed the bullet from the wound in his forehead, but it is highly unlikely that the child will survive. There are wounded among the women as well, but the presence of children who have suffered bayonet wounds casts a particularly painful light on this entire operation.

Moltke, stating these facts, nevertheless expressed that Hafiz Pasha was not at fault and had to use force:

“Since there are men such as the bashi-bazouks, it is known beforehand that many evils that are impossible to prevent will occur. When it is necessary to storm and seize the rocky places and villages where women and children have taken refuge together with their possessions, how can it be possible to wage a gentle war?”

The fact that Muslim Kurds fought alongside the Ottomans against non-Muslim Kurds in the Garzan battles made religion a divisive element among the Kurds and laid the groundwork for future social problems.

== Aftermath ==
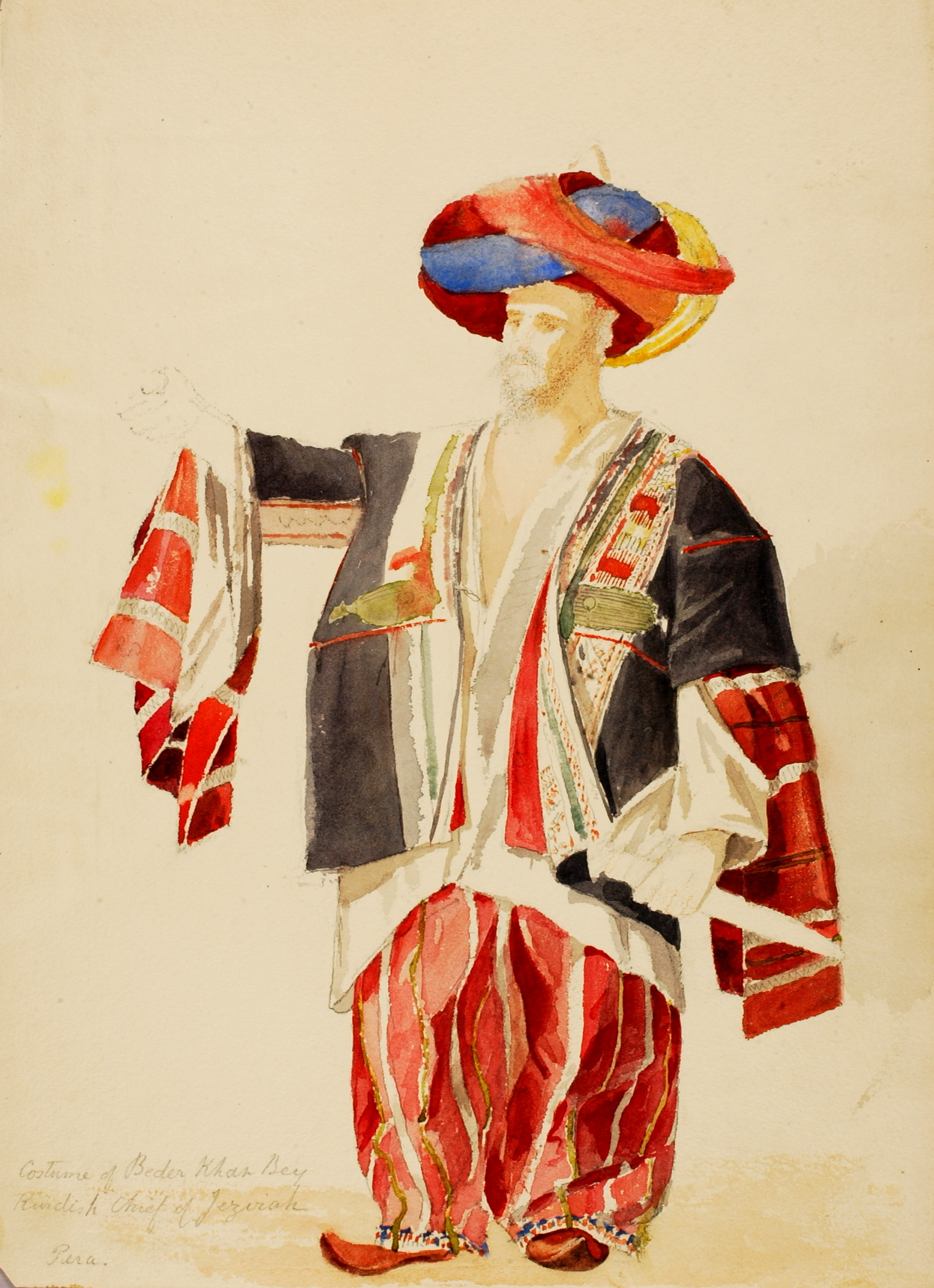
Costume of Beder Khan Bey, by Miner Kilbourne Kellogg

The Ottoman victory led to the dissolution of the Soran Emirate. Kurdish tribal areas were reintegrated into the empire's provincial system, strengthening Ottoman authority in Eastern Anatolia and northern Iraq. The rebellion served as a precursor to later Kurdish revolts, including the uprising led by Bedir Khan Beg.

According to Wadie Jwaideh, after his surrender, Mir Muhammad was sent to Istanbul with guarantees from the Ottoman commander Reşid Mehmed Pasha that he would be treated honorably and allowed to retain his emirate.

Hacı Bekir Agha, the steward of the Baghdad Governor Ali Pasha, who came to Istanbul with Mir Muhammad, reported that the Mir held significant influence in the region and could be of great service to the state if he remained loyal. However, he also warned that pardoning the Mir and sending him back to the region would be highly problematic.

The news of Mir’s potential return to Kurdistan especially alarmed the Governor of Baghdad. He believed that Mir Muhammad's return would only increase his influence and prestige in the region, rendering him uncontrollable. Despite the Sultan’s pardon, Baghdad Governor Ali Pasha took action to prevent Mir's return, strongly opposing it and repeatedly warning Istanbul about the dangers. Through his persistence, he managed to convince Istanbul to find an alternative solution. Ali Pasha claimed that the news of Mir's return was not well received among the people of Kurdistan and corresponded with the Commander of Sivas, suggesting that the Mir, who was en route to return, be held in Amasya until further notice. Ultimately, with the support of the Governor of Sivas, Ali Pasha succeeded in ensuring that the returning Mir of Rawanduz would be detained in Amasya “until the matter was clarified.”

Following Ali Pasha's persistent efforts, an imperial order was issued on 29 Safer 1253 (03.06.1837), mandating that Mir Muhammad remain in Amasya for a while.

Mir Muhammad, who departed from Istanbul with Hacı Veli Agha assigned to his service, arrived in Amasya on 08 Ra 1253 (12.06.1837). There, he was presented with the imperial order by the Amasya district governor Mehmed Şakir Bey, and arrangements were made to accommodate him discreetly under security measures so as not to arouse his suspicion.

Ali Pasha also emphasized that the matter should be communicated to the Amasya Governor in secret to avoid alarming the Mir of Rawanduz. Eventually, with the support of the Sivas Governor, Ali Pasha succeeded in convincing Istanbul that the Mir, detained in Amasya, should not even be allowed to remain in Anatolia and should be sent instead to a place like Shumen in Rumelia.

Despite the Sultan's pardon, the influence of the Governors of Baghdad and Sivas ensured that the Mir of Rawanduz, detained in Amasya, was never able to return to Kurdistan. There is no definitive record of how he died. However, the prevailing belief is that he was the victim of an assassination. A report dated 9 Shawwal 1254 (26.12.1838) refers to Mir Muhammad of Rawanduz as deceased.

== See also ==
- Yazidi genocide by Soran Emirate (1832–1834)
- Soran Emirate

== Other link ==
- Academy of Sciences of the USSR & Institute of Oriental Studies, Armenian SSR. (Trans. by M. Aras), The History of Kurdish Politics in Modern Times, Pêrî Publications, Istanbul, 1998, ISBN 975-8245-06-6.
