= Oramar Revolt =

Kurdish uprising in 1930

- Part of Kurdish uprisings
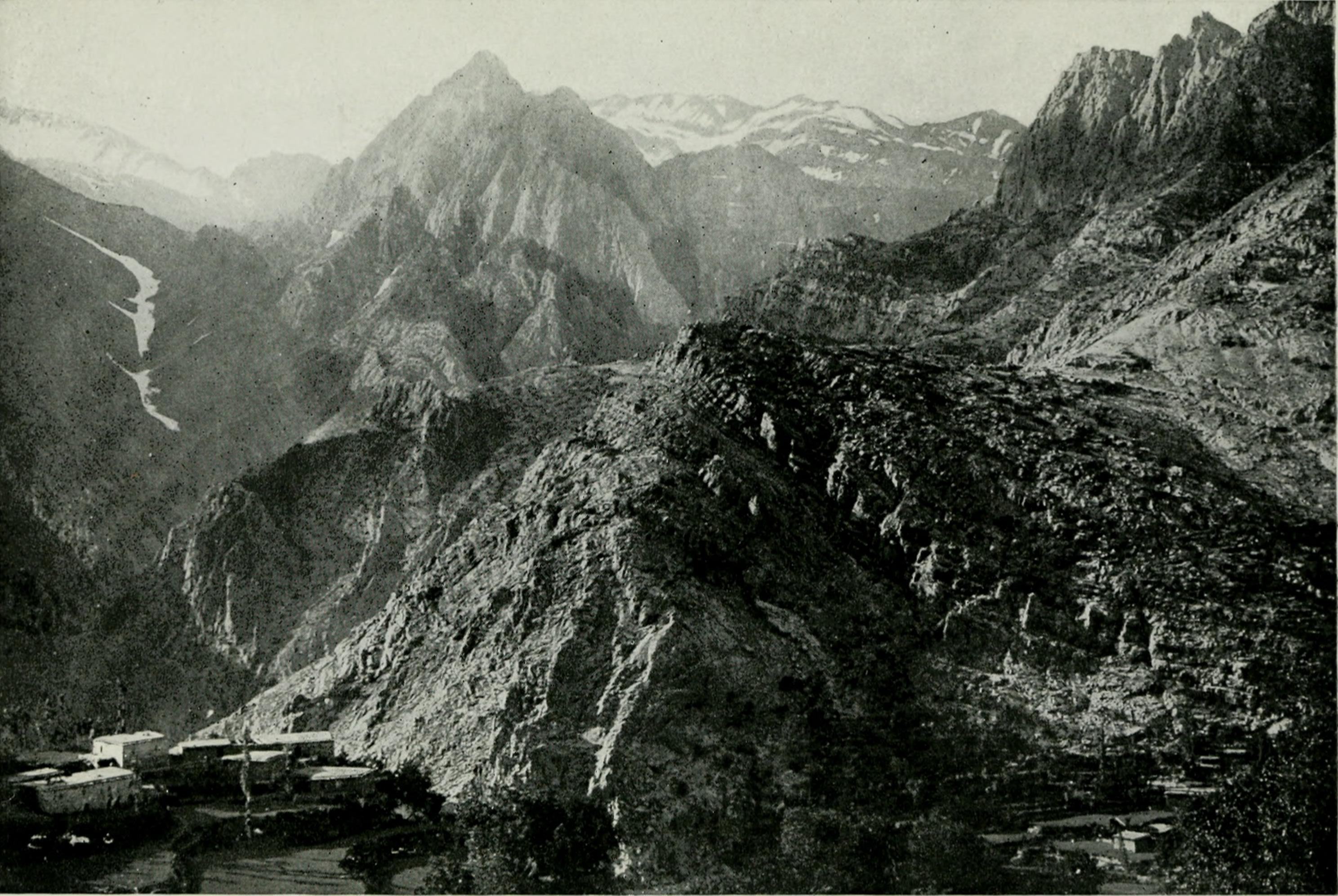
- Oramar in 1922
| Date | July 16, 1930 – October 10, 1930 |
| Location | Hakkâri Province, Turkey |
| Result | Turkish victory |

Belligerents
| Turkey | Barzani tribe |

Commanders and leaders
| Unknown | Molla Hussein Sharif; Sheikh Molla Mustafa |

Strength
| Unknown | 500 |

The Oramar Revolt was a Kurdish uprising against the Republic of Turkey that took place in 1930. The rebellion ended when some Kurdish tribes resisted alongside Turkish soldiers, and the Turkish Army began aerial bombardment, forcing Kurdish rebels to withdraw to Iraq.

== Background ==
In 1930, the mandate in Iraq began to place a heavy burden on Britain, leading Britain to decide to grant Iraq autonomy and withdraw all its forces from the country. During the same period, Turkey, under the leadership of Mustafa Kemal Atatürk, was fighting for its National Pact (Mîsâk-ı Millî) goals. Anticipating Turkey intervention in Iraq, Britain, after the Sheikh Said Rebellion, gathered the leaders of the disbanded Society for the Rise of Kurdistan and the Armenian Revolutionary Federation under the Xoybûn. Their aim was both to keep Turkey away from Iraqi territory and to establish a Kurdish state in southeastern Turkey, organizing various rebellions to achieve this goal. These plans were viewed favorably by the people of the region because they were in the interest of Armenians, Kurds, and Britain alike.

Under the leadership of Sheikh Ahmed Barzani, other Kurdish tribes decided to hold a meeting in the region. At this meeting, held in Iraq, the attack forces, the attack plan, the commanders who would lead the attack, and the timing were determined.

== Revolt ==
A group of 500 armed rebels launched an attack on the Oramar outpost on July 21, 1930. However, the outpost could not be captured because some tribal leaders who had attended a previous meeting went to support the outpost after the meeting. After repeated attacks failed to capture the outpost, the rebels decided to besiege it. Cutting off roads and telephone lines, the rebels continued their attacks for some time. Simultaneously, rebellions broke out in other parts of Eastern Anatolia, preventing the Turkish Army from sending reinforcements. Finding it difficult to suppress the events, the government decided on an air offensive. On the morning of July 28, the Turkish Army began bombing the rebels from the air and simultaneously entered the village. The rebel forces, whose power was broken, retreated to Iraq.

Between September 27 and October 10, a second military operation was carried out covering Şemdinli, Yüksekova, Çukurca, and Hakkari, and the region was completely cleared of rebels.

== Bibliography ==
- Gunter, Michael M. (2018). Historical dictionary of the Kurds. Lanham: Rowman & Littlefield Publishers. ISBN 978-1538110492.
- Gürbüz, Macit (2021). Kürtleşen Türkler Eskiden Türk'tük, şimdi Kürdük. p. 339.
- Mumcu, Uğur (2018). Kürt Dosyası. Ankara: Uğur Mumcu Araştırmacı Gazetecilik Vakfı Yayınları. p. 23. ISBN 9786054274512.
- Türkmen, Hamza (2013). Ulusçuluk Çıkmazı Kürtler ve Çözüm Arayışı. Istanbul: Ekin Yayinlari. p. 34. ISBN 9786257105590.
- Yanmis, Mehmet (2016). The Resurgence of the Kurdish Conflict in Turkey: How Kurds View It. Washington, USA: Rethink Institute. p. 3. ISBN 9781938300356.
