= Ali Batı Rebellion =

- Part of Timeline of Kurdish uprisings
Date	11 May 1919 – 18 August 1919
Location	Nusaybin
Result	Turkish victory

Belligerents
(Turkey) Government of the Grand National Assembly	Rebels led by Ali Batı

Commanders and leaders
(Turkey) Yusuf Ziya (Turkey) Nuri Bey	Ali Batı †

The Ali Batı Rebellion (Note: Kurdish: Serhildana Elî Batî Turkish: Ali Batı İsyanı) was a Kurdish uprising launched by Ali Batı against the Turkish government on 11 May 1919.

== Background ==
Ali Batı, the chief of one of the tribes south of Midyat, led a Kurdish uprising in 1919 by taking advantage of British encouragement of Kurdish nationalism. His aim was to establish a Kurdish state. Claiming that he had been appointed governor of the region by a decree of the sultan, Ali Batı spread propaganda stating that he would ensure security in Mardin, Savur, Cizre, Nusaybin, and their surrounding areas, thereby gaining the support of several local tribes.

== Revolt ==
On 11 May 1919, Ali Batı entered Nusaybin and openly declared a rebellion, even proclaiming himself governor. The district governor of Nusaybin and the commander of the 13th Regiment of the 24th Division warned him that his actions were unlawful. Despite these warnings, Ali Batı refused to abandon the uprising. As a result, the 13th Regiment was deployed to suppress the revolt. The 6th Division took further measures, including the exile of Ali Batı’s family. On 18 August 1919, Ali Batı was killed during military operations, bringing the Revolt to an end.
