= Ibrahim Pasha Baban =

Ottoman statesman and general (died 1806)

- ئیبراهیم پاشا بابان
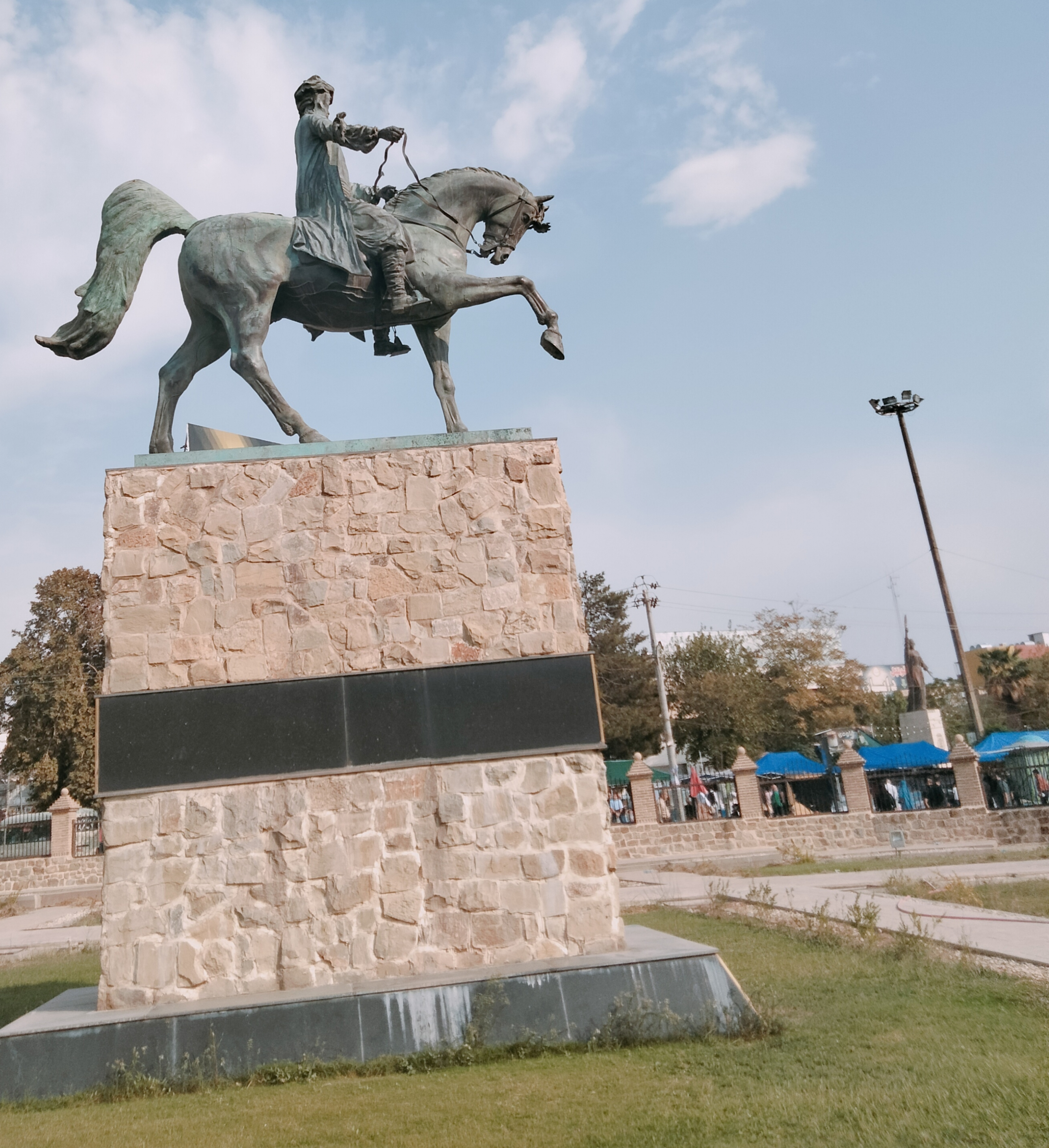
- Statue of Ibrahim Pasha in Sulaymaniyah
- Born: Unknown; Sulaymaniah
- Died: 1806; Sulaymaniah
- Years active: 1783-1803
- Notable work: Founder of Sulaymaniah
- Predecessor: Sulaiman Pasha of Baban
- Successor: Abdulrahman Pasha Baban
- Father: Ahmed
- Relatives: Baba Sulaiman (grandfather)
- Family: Baban

Ibrahim Ahmed Sulaiman Pasha of Baban known as Ibrahim Pasha Baban (Kurdish: ئیبراهیم پاشا بابان; ? - 1806) was one of the most famous ottoman princes of the Kurdish Baban family and leader of the Baban dynasty; one of his most notable works was the establishment of the city of Sulaymaniyah in 1784.

== Background ==
Sulaymaniyah was built during the reign of Ibrahim Pasha of the House of Baban who reigned from 1783 to 1803, the last Kurdish principality that ruled parts of South Kurdistan. This powerful dynasty was founded by Baba Sulayman who, in the seventeenth century, rendered important services to the Ottomans in a war against the Safavids and as such was rewarded with all he could conquer. In 1783, Ibrahim Pasha moved the Baban capital to Sulaymaniyah, a new town he had built which he named after his grandfather, Baba Sulaiman.
