= Mehmed Necib Pasha =

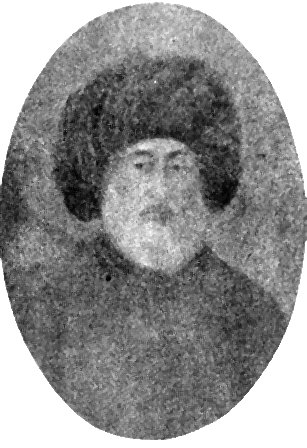
Mehmed Necib Pasha

Mehmed Necib Pasha (died 1851), also known as Muhammad Najib Pasha or Gürcü Mehmet Necip Paşa or Necib Pasha, was an Ottoman statesman and governor of Georgian origin. He was the governor of Baghdad Eyalet, succeeding Ali Ridha Pasha (who had brought Iraq back into direct Ottoman control).

His father's name was Abdülmucib. He was married to Zeliha Hanim (died 1863) and his daughter was Fatima Hanim (died 1881), his son's was Ahmed Şükrü Bey, Cemil Bey and Mahmud Nedim Pasha, was a two-time Grand Vizier of the Ottoman Empire.

== Library ==
Mehmed Necib Pasha is known for having the Necip Paşa Library (Turkish: Necip Paşa Kütüphanesi) in Tire built in 1827 (today in İzmir Province, Turkey). At the time, he was serving as the "Minister of Powder Mills" (Turkish: Baruthaneler Nazırı). It is not known why he had it built in Tire, as no known connection between him and the city existed before the library.

The library contains inscriptions made during construction, one of which reads:

Ottoman Turkish	Turkish transliteration	Modern Turkish	English
سكا مدح و ثن اير نجيبا عر ش رحمانه كه زيرا بيت معموره اديل اولدي كتبخانه سكا توفيق رفيق اولدي كه يابدك بر اولو خيرات جز اك الله ديوب جمله دعلار ايتدي يزدانه كتابلر جونكه وضع اولدي تيره انوارله طولدي اهاليسي فرح بولدي شكرلر ايتدي منانه علوم ظاهره بونده علوم باطنه بونده وسيله سعادتدر كرنلره بو نوخانه ويره بنيسينه مو لى جهانده منصب والا جهانده رتبهء أعلا جوار اوله او سبحانه مجوهر هرفله زهدي ديدي تاريخ بدنيني نه كونه وصف ايدرلرسه روادر اول كتبخانه ۱۲٤۲	Sana medhü senâ irdi Necibâ arş-ı Rahmane Ki zirâ beyt-i ma'mûra adîl oldu kütübhâne Sana tevfik-i refik oldu ki yaptın bir ulu hayrât Cezâkellahu deyüb cümle duâlar itdi Yezdâne Kitâblar çünkü vaz oldu Tire envârla doldu Ahâlisi ferâh buldu şükürler itdi Mennâna Ulûm-ı zâhire bunda ulûm-ı bâtına bunda Vesîle-i saâdettir girenlere bu nevhâne Vire bânisine Mevlâ cihânda mansıb-ı vâlâ Cihânda rütbe-i a'lâ civâr ola o Subhâna Mücevher harfle Zühdi didi târîh-i bed'ini Ne güne vasf iderlerse revâdır ol kütübhâne 1242	Ey Necib! Sana yapılan dualar Rahman'ın arşına erişti Zira kütüphane, güzel bir eve eş olarak yapıldı. Yaptığın bu ulu hayrat, sana güzel bir arkadaş oldu. Herkes, "Allah sana mükafatını versin" diyip Allah'a dua etti. Kitaplar konulduğu için Tire nurlarla doldu. Burada yaşayanlar sevinip Yaradan'a şükürler etti. Zahirî ve batınî ilimlerin hepsi burada Bu yeni binaya girenler için kurtuluş vasıtasıdır. Mevla, bu binayı yaptırana dünyada yüksek mevkiler versin. Cennette, yüce rütbe ile Sübhan'a yakın olsun. Zühdi, binanın başlama tarihini mücevher harflerle söyledi: "Bu kütüphane ne şekilde övülürse övülsün hepsine layıktır." 1242 AH (M. 1826–27)	O Necib! The prayers made for you have reached God's throne Therefore, a library has been built to match a good house. This great work of charity has become a good friend for you. Everyone has prayed for you, saying "May God reward you!" Because books have been put here, Tire has filled with light. The people who live here rejoiced and thanked the Creator. Both the superficial and esoteric sciences are here [This building] is a vehicle for salvation for all who enter. May the Lord grant the builder with high positions in life. May he be close to God and have a high station in heaven. Of the dedication of the building, Zühdi said grandly: "This library is worthy of all praises said before it." 1242 AH (1826–27 AD)
