= Tutaklı Ali Can Rebellion =

- Part of Timeline of Kurdish uprisings
Date	7 July 1930 – 2 November 1930
Location	Ağrı, Muş, Erzurum
Result	Turkish victory

Belligerents
Turkey	Rebels led by Ali Can

Commanders and leaders
Unknown	Ali Can †; Seyit Han †

Strength
Unknown	400

The Tutaklı Alican Rebellion was a local uprising that took place in 1930 in the present-day districts of Tutak, Bulanık, Karaçoban, Köprüköy, Hınıs and Karayazı in support of the Ararat rebellion. This rebellion was supported by the Berazî and Hasenan (Seyîdan) tribes.

In the spring of 1930, Ferzende Bey of Hasenan visited Ali Can, the leader of the Berazî tribe, and asked him to support the Ararat rebellion. As a result, on July 7, 1930, Ali Can attacked the detachment in the Karayazı district of Pasinler with 40 cavalrymen, thus beginning a rebellion that lasted for three months. At the beginning of August, Ali Can sought refuge with Seyit Han, the head of the Seyîdan branch of the Hasenan tribe, in the Bulanık district of Muş. With Seyit Han and his brothers joining the rebellion, the number of rebels rose to 400. After two months of constant clashes with military units and Kurdish-Alevi tribes (Çarekan) along the Bulanık-Hınıs-Karayazı line, Ali Can was killed in a skirmish. Faced with the failure of the rebellion, Seyit Han and his relatives fled to Syria to reorganize, but were ambushed and killed by the military near Mardin with the help of Kurdish tribes.

Approximately 400 rebels participated in the uprising in the Muş region. Suppressing the rebellion took four months; the main reason for this was the insufficient number of soldiers deployed to the area. The rebellion was suppressed on November 2, 1930.

== Bibliography ==
- Çorbacı, İsmail (2009). Bilinmeyen Atatürk. Az Boek. p. 1. ISBN 9786054812882.,
- Vedat, Şadillili (1980). Türkiye'de Kürtçülük hareketleri ve isyanlar. Kon Yayınları. p. 290.,
- Erer, Tekin (1990). Kürt meselesi. Boğaziçi Yayınları. p. 19. ISBN 9789754510294.,
- Koçaş, M.Sadi (1990). Kürtlerin kökeni ve Güneydoğu Anadolu gerçeği. Kastaş. p. 148. ISBN 9789757639299.,
- Dark, Ken (1996). New Studies in Post-cold War Security. Dartmouth Publishing. p. 200. ISBN 9781855217287.,
