= Dervish Pasha's Revolt =

- Part of Timeline of Kurdish uprisings
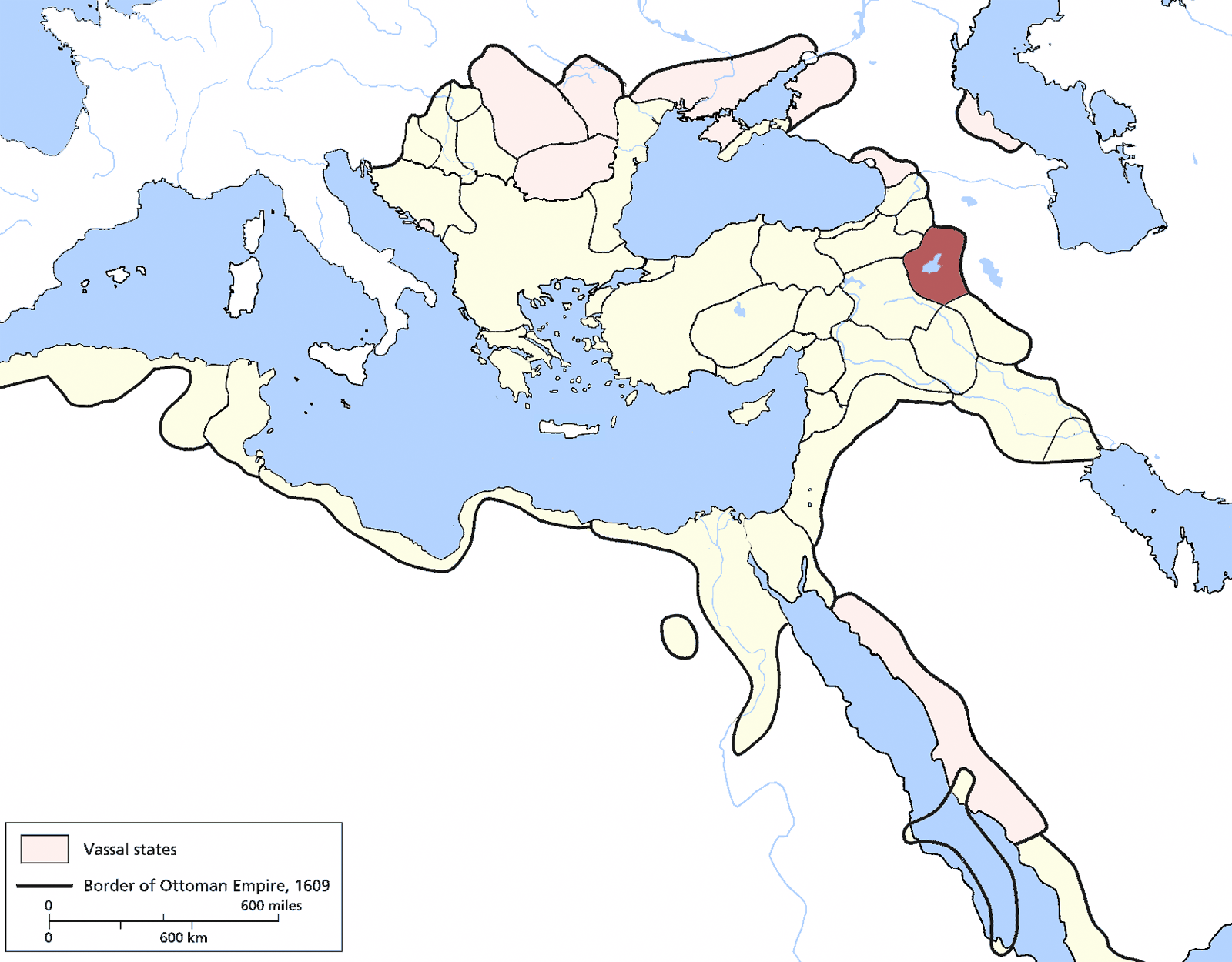
- The Eyalet of Van
Date	1816–13 August 1819
Location	Van Eyalet
Result	Ottoman victory

Belligerents
Ottoman Empire	Followers of Dervish Pasha; Some Kurdish groups

Commanders and leaders
(Ottoman Empire) Sert Mahmud Pasha (Ottoman Empire) Selim Pasha (Ottoman Empire) İbrahim Yumnî Pasha (Ottoman Empire) Silahdar Ali Pasha	Dervish Pasha (executed)

The Dervish Pasha's Revolt was a 19th-century uprising in the Van Eyalet of the Ottoman Empire. Dervish Pasha, who had been appointed as the fortress commander and governor of the district of Van in 1816, refused to withdraw from the region after he had been ordered to do so following altercations with the governor of Erzurum. Later he made an alliance with some Kurdish groups and he gathered troops and raided the villages near Van. The conflict was further intensified by the migration of the Sipki Kurdish tribe from Iran into the Ottoman Empire, which led to fighting in the Van district.

== Background ==
In the early 1800s, Van and Hakkari were subject to the governors of Erzurum and Sivas, and numerous Kurdish emirates in the periphery were among those with which they coexisted. Van was governed by a kaymakam appointed by the governor of Erzurum, and Kurdish emirs were as powerful in Hakkari as they were elsewhere in the region.

Dervish Pasha was appointed as the fortress commander and kaymakam of Van in 1816. After contending in the region, Erzurum Governor Ahmed Pasha demanded that he vacate the post, and the Ottoman government consented. Mustafa Pashazade Ibrahim Yumnî Bey was recommended as his successor.

== Revolt ==
After the Ottoman palace permitted the dismissal of Dervish Pasha, he did not abandon Van but rather made common cause with certain Kurdish tribes in the vicinity. A raiding party consisting of soldiers that Dervish Pasha had recruited from these groups attacked a number of villages, according to a letter from the Sivas governor dated 22 February 1817. The report also says that, “Some people have crossed into Iran.”

It was not long before the fighting broke out on the Ottoman-Iranian border. In a report from the Erzurum governor dated 7 August 1817, it was stated that Dervish Pasha had already made incursions into an Iranian region, and the Iranians had conducted reprisals by invading the borderlands near Mahmudi Hoşap and drawing a number of the inhabitants over to their side. Dervish Pasha had asked Erzurum for arms and munitions in the wake of the Iranian assault, but the Erzurum officials were hesitant to back him.

Responding to the Iranian attacks, Dervish Pasha departed from Van for Hoşap where he defeated Hasan Khan. The Erzurum authorities, who had previously been unwilling to assist him, were forced to dispatch ammunition to Dervish Pasha. The escalating dispute also led the Ottoman officials to keep a close eye on events and on the movements of Dervish Pasha.

Ottoman accounts suggested that Dervish Pasha still defied the will of the central government. But they also saw signs of tension and mistrust between the Kurdish emirs in the area, including between Dervish Pasha and the rulers of Hakkari.

The Ottomans also worried about the loyalty of the Kurdish forces linked to Selim Pasha, and cautioned that the fate of the Van question should not be left in his hands alone. Among the Turks was Dervish Pasha, who quarreled with a number of Kurdish emirs, including those of Hakkari, Hizan, Bohtan and Şirvan, and who was attacked in some of his domains by Kurdish troops.

While the tension mounted, the Ottomans started to organize an offensive against Dervish Pasha. Disturbances had taken place in Erzurum, though not yet in that region. Persian Prince Abbas Mirza and Revan Serdar Hüseyin Khan had also been notified to stay away from aiding him. As 1818 came to a close, Dervish Pasha was compelled to evacuate Van when Ibrahim Yumnî Pasha, Selim Pasha and Silahdar Ali Pasha marched on Van with their men.

The Ottoman drive up toward Van placed Dervish Pasha under increasing strain. Selim Pasha attached himself to the army which was advancing on the town, while Ibrahim Yumnî Pasha proceeded to Van with his army, while Ibrahim Yumnî Pasha proceeded to Van with his army. Ottoman troops had entered Van by the end of 1818 after its people had begged for protection. Dervish Pasha then retreated from the city.

Ibrahim Yumnî Pasha, who had been named Dervish Pasha's successor as governor of Van, then took his own life in despair. Dervish Pasha had invaded Van with bands of Iranian Kurds, according to reports that reached the Ottoman government. In retaliation, the Ottoman regime resolved to intensify its military preparations to crush the rising. Sert Mahmud Pasha was named to command the operation, and the governors of Sivas, Erzurum, Muş, Trabzon, Maraş, Diyarbakır and Maden were ordered to make their preparations.

The negotiations did not win Dervish Pasha over. Sert Mahmud Pasha and Selim Pasha later marched on Van with their troops. They arrived at Van on 11 August 1819. Dervish Pasha was captured, having failed in his attempt to escape and failed to hide himself, and executed on 13 August 1819. His execution brought the revolt to an end.

== Sources ==
- Ateş, Sabri (2013). Ottoman-Iranian Borderlands: Making a Boundary, 1843–1914. Cambridge University Press. ISBN 9781107033658.
- Hakan, Sinan (2011). Osmanlı Arşiv Belgelerinde Kürtler ve Kürt Direnişleri (1817–1867) (in Turkish). Doz Publishing. ISBN 9789756876916.
- Millingen, Frederick (1870). Wild Life Among the Koords. London: Hurst and Blackett.
- Gencer, Fatih (2010). "Van Muhafızı Derviş Paşa İsyanı". Tarih Araştırmaları Dergisi. 29 (47): 197–216.
