= Timeline of Kurdish uprisings =

This is an incomplete list of Kurdish uprisings. You can help by expanding it.

== List of conflicts ==
Date	Uprising	Location	Result
838–841	Dasini tribe uprising against the Abbasids	Abbasid Caliphate	Suppressed
955–1071	War against the Musafirid.	Rawadid dynasty	Victory
990–1085	Kurdish uprising	The Marwanids	Victory, led to the birth of the Marwanids dynasty
1506–1510	Kurdish Mokri uprising against the Safavids	Safavid Persia	Suppressed
1609–1610	Battle of Dimdim	Safavid Persia	Suppressed
1775	Bajalan uprising	Zand dynasty	Suppressed
1806–1812	Babanzade Rebellions (1806–1812)	Ottoman Empire	Suppressed
1816–1819	Dervish Pasha's Revolt	Ottoman Empire	Suppressed
1830–1838	Mir Muhammed Rebellion	Ottoman Empire	Suppressed
1838	Han Mahmud Revolt	Ottoman Empire	Suppressed
1838	Sait Beg Rebellion	Ottoman Empire	Suppressed
1839	Garzan Uprising	Ottoman Empire	Suppressed
1845–1847; 1854–1855	First Bedirkhanis Revolt	Ottoman Empire	Suppressed
1854–1855	Yezdanşêr's uprising	Ottoman Empire	Suppressed
1877	Dersim Rebellion (1877)	Ottoman Empire	
1877–1878	Second Bedirkhanis Revolt	Ottoman Empire	Suppressed
1880–1881	Revolt by Sheikh Ubeydullah of Nehri against the Qajars.	Qajar Persia Ottoman Empire	Defeat
1889	Emin Ali Bedirkhan Revolt	Ottoman Empire	Suppressed
1892	Dersim Rebellion(1892)	Ottoman Empire	Suppressed
1907	Bitlis Uprising (1907)	Ottoman Empire	Suppressed
1907–1909	Dersim Rebellion (1907–1909)	Ottoman Empire	Kurdish military victory Ottoman diplomatic victory
1908-1911	Hamawand rebellion	Ottoman Empire	Suppressed
Early March – 4 April 1914	Bitlis uprising (1914)	Ottoman Empire	Suppressed
1914 – 1918	Kurdish rebellions during World War I	Ottoman Empire	Establishment of a quasi-independent Kurdish state until 1919
1919–1922 – First Mahmud Barzanji Revolt	First Mahmud Barzanji revolt	Kingdom of Iraq	Suppressed
1918–1922	First Simko Shikak revolt	Qajar Persia	Suppressed
1918–present	Iraqi–Kurdish conflict	Iraq	Ongoing
1918–present	Kurdish–Iranian conflict	Qajar Persia	Ongoing
1919	Ali Batı Rebellion	Turkey	Suppressed
1919–1924	Kurdish revolts in Iraq (1919–1924)	Kingdom of Iraq	Suppressed
1919-1920	Surchi revolt	Iraq Levies	Suppressed
17 August- Early September 1919	Kağızman Uprising (Note: Muslim uprisings in Kars and Sharur–Nakhichevan)	First Republic of Armenia	Suppressed
1920	Penek Uprising (Note: Muslim uprisings in Kars and Sharur–Nakhichevan)	First Republic of Armenia	Suppressed
1920	Cemil Çeto Uprising	Turkey	Suppressed
6 March – 17 June 1921	Koçgiri rebellion	Turkey	Suppressed
November 1922 – July 1924	Second Mahmud Barzanji revolt	Kingdom of Iraq, Kingdom of Kurdistan	Suppressed
August 1924	Beytüşşebab rebellion	Turkey	Suppressed
8 February – March 1925	Sheikh Said rebellion	Turkey	Suppressed
1925	Raman and Reşkotan Uprising	Turkey	Suppressed
1926	Second Simko Shikak revolt	Pahlavi Persia	Suppressed, Simko Shikak flees to Mandatory Iraq
1926	Koçuşağı Rebellion	Turkey	Suppressed
1927	Mutki Uprising	Turkey	Suppressed
22 May – 3 August 1929	Asi Resul Rebellion	Turkey	Suppressed
September 1929	Tendürek Uprisings	Turkey	Suppressed
October 1927 – September 17, 1930	First, second and third Ararat rebellion	Republic of Ararat, Republic of Turkey	Suppressed, Republic of Ararat disbanded
July 7, 1930 – November 2, 1930	Tutaklı Ali Can Rebellion	Republic of Turkey	Suppressed
July 16, 1930 – October 10, 1930	Oramar Revolt	Turkey	Suppressed
1931	Jafar Sultan revolt	Iran	Suppressed
1931–1932	Ahmed Barzani revolt	Kingdom of Iraq	Suppressed, low-level insurgency continues through 1933, another revolt by Barzanis erupts in 1943
1935	Yazidi revolt of 1935	Mandatory Iraq	Suppressed
20 March – November, 1937 and 2 January – December, 1938	Dersim rebellion	Republic of Turkey	Revolt suppressed, Turkey would, inresponse, begin the Dersim Genocide.
1941–1944	Hama Rashid revolt	Pahlavi Iran	Suppressed, Hama Rashid driven into Iraq
1943	1943 Barzani revolt	Kingdom of Iraq	Suppressed
November 1945 – December 15, 1946	Iran crisis of 1946	Pahlavi Iran, Republic of Mahabad	Creation of the Soviet-backed Republic of Mahabad, revolt later suppressed
11 September 1961 – 1970	First Iraqi–Kurdish War	Republic of Iraq	Stalemate, led to the Iraqi-Kurdish Autonomy Agreement of 1970
1967	1967 Kurdish revolt in Iran	Pahlavi Iran	Suppressed
April 1974 – 1975	Second Iraqi–Kurdish War	Iraq	Suppressed, the Iraqi government re-establishes control over Kurdistan
1976–1978	PUK insurgency	Iraq	Long-term Iraqi victory, led to the Kurdish rebellion of 1983
1979	1979 Kurdish rebellion in Iran	Iran	Suppressed
1983–1986	Kurdish rebellion of 1983	Iraq	Indecisive, led to the Anfal campaign.
15 August 1984 – 12 May 2025	Kurdish–Turkish conflict	Republic of Turkey	Ceasefire
1986–1996	KDPI insurgency	Government of Iran	Suppressed; KDPI announces unilateral cease-fire in 1996
1993-present	Islamist insurgency in the Kurdistan Region	(Kurdistan Region) Iraqi Kurdistan	Ongoing
1 March – 5 April 1991	1991 Iraqi uprisings	Ba'athist Iraq, Kurdistan Region	Iraqi military victory; establishment of the Kurdish Autonomous Republic, also known as Iraqi Kurdistan
March 2004	2004 Qamishli riots	Syria	Suppressed
1 April 2004–present	Iran–PJAK conflict	Iran	Ongoing
19 July 2012 – 20 August 2026	Rojava conflict	Syria	Syrian transitional government victory
24 July 2015 – 12 May 2025	Kurdish–Turkish conflict	Republic of Turkey	Ceasefire
19 April 2016 – c. August 2023	Western Iran clashes	Iran	Indecisive, led to renewed conflict in 2026
24 August 2016 – 20 January 2026	Turkish involvement in the Syrian civil war	Syria	Turkey-Syrian opposition victory
15 – 27 October 2017	2017 Iraqi-Kurdish conflict	Kurdistan Region	Iraqi victory, Kurdistan Region loses territory including Sinjar, Kirkuk and Khanaqin.
7 June 2026 – present	Western Iran clashes	Iran	Ongoing

== See also ==
- A Modern History of the Kurds by David McDowall
