= Izzet Ahmed Pasha =

Ottoman statesman (1798–1876)

Izzet Ahmed Pasha (1798 – 20 February 1876), also known as Ahmed Izzet Pasha or Hacı Izzet Pasha or Hakkı Paşazâde Izzet Pasha, was an Ottoman statesman who held a lengthy series of provincial governorships from 1841 to 1870. He was also a vizier (made on 20 September 1845).

Early in his career, Izzet Ahmed Pasha was first kapıcıbaşı (master of ceremonies) at the imperial palace in Constantinople (modern Istanbul) and later the voivode of the Sanjak of Sivas. He was then made a ferik (Lieutenant General) in the Ottoman army. After this, he served as the Ottoman governor of:

- Sidon Eyalet (December 1841 – July 1842)
- Adana Eyalet (March 1843 – March 1844)
- Bolu Sanjak (March 1844 – September 1845)
- Diyarbekir Eyalet (September 1845 – October 1846)
- Erzurum Eyalet (November 1846 – November 1847)
- Ioannina Eyalet (March–September 1848, January 1855 – January 1856)
- Tripolitania (September 1848 – August 1852)
- Damascus Eyalet (1856–1857)
- Trabzon Eyalet (August 1858 – August 1860)
- Jeddah Eyalet (October 1861 – September 1864)
- Konya Vilayet (August 1865 – June 1867)
- Hüdavendigâr Vilayet (November 1868 – April 1870)

Izzet Ahmed Pasha was the son of Hakkı Mehmed Pasha (1747–1811), a prominent bureaucrat, vizier, and statesman of the time, and reportedly counted the 16th-century statesman Sokollu Mehmed Pasha as among his ancestors. While posted in Baghdad, he married the daughter of Ali Rıza Pasha, Baghdad's governor. When his father-in-law was dismissed from the governorship of Baghdad, the decree that dismissed him cited Izzet Ahmed Pasha as a source of complaints against alleged abuses of his father-in-law's administration, most likely pointing to a fallout or disagreement between the two, or a political plot against Ali Rıza Pasha by his son-in-law.

With his wife, Izzet Ahmed Pasha himself had three sons: Aziz Pasha (1835–1903), also a serial provincial governor; Hakkı Pasha (died 1877), a mutasarrıf of Bihać; and Süleyman Bey.

Izzet Ahmed Pasha retired from public office in 1870. He died six years later on 20 February 1876 and was buried in Haydarpaşa Cemetery in Istanbul.

== See also ==
- List of governors of Sidon Eyalet
- List of Ottoman governors of Tripolitania
- List of Ottoman governors of Damascus
