= Letters from Turkey (Moltke) =

Series of letters by Helmuth von Moltke the Elder

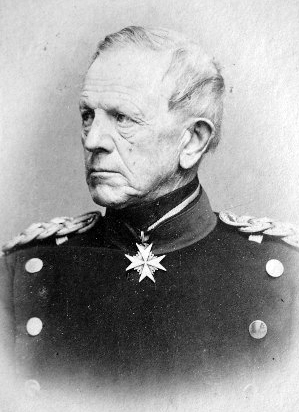
Moltke

Letters on Conditions and Events in Turkey in the Years 1835–1839 (German: Briefe über Zustände und Begebenheiten in der Türkei aus den Jahren 1835 bis 1839) or Letters from Turkey for short, is the name given to the series of letters written by Helmuth von Moltke during his stay in the Ottoman Empire between 1835 and 1839.

== Background ==
Helmuth von Moltke the Elder was a German (Prussian) field marshal. He was the top commander of the army during the 1871 Franco-Prussian War. But while he was a junior officer he had spent more than 4 years in the Ottoman Empire as a military adviser. He came to Turkey for only a brief stay. But while in Istanbul, he was requested by the Ottoman government to enter the Turkish service, and being authorized from his headquarters, he accepted the offer. (Janissaries, the traditional Ottoman army was recently abolished and the government was trying to establish a new army.)

== The letters ==
During his stay in the empire, he wrote a series of 67 letters to his family members and friends in Germany about the Ottoman Empire. But according to Turkish interpreter Hayrullah Örs, some of these letters were not really letters, but were essays on certain topics and were added to the collection later (like the letter about Wallachia and another one about quarantine measures in the Ottoman Empire). The letters were published in French newspaper Le Temps in 1872, i.e., soon after the Franco-Prussian War. In the introduction the editor M.Neffzer wrote that these letters reflect the intellectual background of the enemy.

== Moltke's stay in the Ottoman Empire ==
Moltke travelled to Istanbul following the route Ruse, Shumen (both in modern Bulgaria) and Edirne. During his stay in Istanbul he lived in Büyükdere a suburb of Istanbul. He paid short visits to Bursa, İzmir and Çanakkale - Troy. In 1837 spring, he accompanied the sultan Mahmut II in his visit to European provinces of the empire, like Varna, Tırnova (Veliko Tarnovo) and Silistra (all in Bulgaria). In 1838 he was appointed as the adviser of the army in Anatolia. He sailed to Samsun and he visited Amasya, Tokat and Sivas. He then travelled to Malatya in East Anatolia where he collaborated with the governor of Diyarbakır and Sivas, Hafız Mehmed Pasha, the Circassian, who was trying to defeat Kurdish rebel warlords in Eastern Anatolia and Northern Iraq. He visited Musul (in modern Iraq), Diyarbakır and Şanlıurfa. In 1838 Autumn, he paid a short visit to Central Anatolia over Kayseri, Nevşehir and Aksaray. He turned back from Konya over Ereğli. In 1839 he was the adviser of Hafız Mehmed Pasha during the battle of Nizip against Egyptian rebels (See Ibrahim Pasha of Egypt). But according to his letters written in Birecik and Malatya, Hafız Mehmet Pasha ignored his suggestions. The result was a defeat. After the defeat, Moltke returned to Istanbul. After a short stay, he returned home. Apart from the details of the battle, the only lasting benefit which the Ottomans got from his service was his memoirs which served as guidelines for all subsequent German officers who served in the Ottoman Empire.

Moltke's travels in Turkey
