= Hafiz Mehmed Pasha (died 1866) =

Ottoman military officer

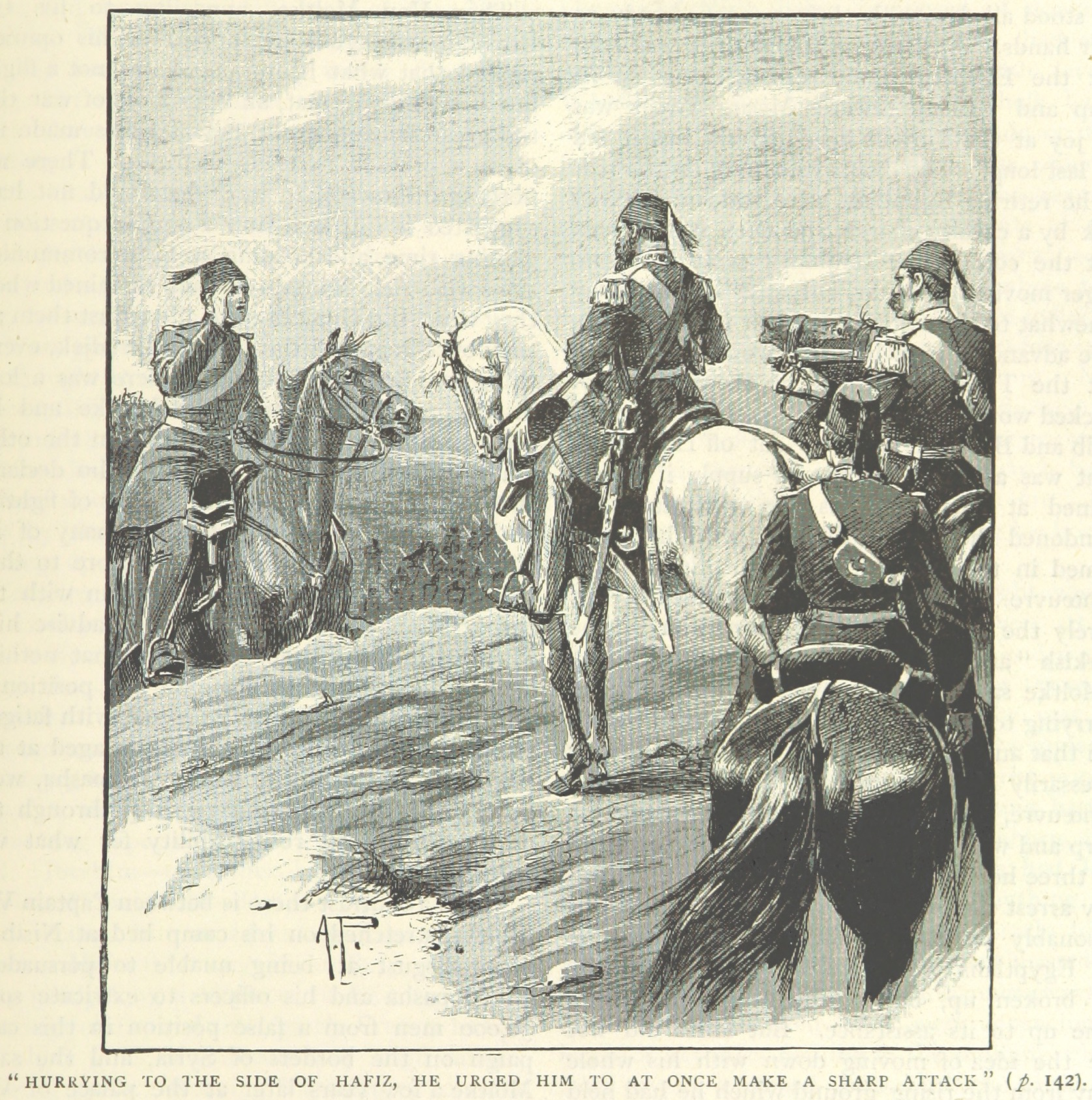
- Helmuth von Moltke (left) advises Hafiz Mehmed Pasha

Governor of Trabzon Vilayet
- In office April 1854 – November 1855

Personal details
- Born: Unknown
- Died: May 3, 1866 Medina, Ottoman Empire

Military service
- Allegiance: Ottoman Empire
- Battles/wars: Mir Muhammed Rebellion (1837–1838); Second Egyptian–Ottoman War (1839); Battle of Nezib; Crimean War (1855–1856)

Hafiz Mehmed Pasha (died 3 May 1866) was an Ottoman military officer and statesman of Circassian origin.

He was known for his strength and fame in wrestling. He was raised in the Ottoman court and became a tebdil hasekisi (an aide during disguised imperial excursions). During the formation of the Nizamiye army, he was promoted to the rank of Binbaşı and then to Miralay in April–May 1828. Shortly after, he became a cavalry Liva. In October–November 1833, he was appointed as the governor (mutasarrıf) of Shkodër with the rank of Ferik. After his service there, he was assigned as Ferik in Kütahya.

In November 1836, he was promoted to the rank of Vezir and appointed governor of Kurdistan and Sivas. In early 1839, he was appointed Serdar-ı Ekrem to lead the Ottoman army against Egypt. Although the campaign resulted in a defeat at the Battle of Nizip on 29 June 1839, he retained his governorship of Sivas and later became governor of Erzurum in September 1839. He was dismissed from Erzurum in February 1841.

In February 1842, he served briefly as acting Serasker (commander-in-chief), and was dismissed in January 1843 when the office was abolished. In April 1843, he became governor of the Belgrade Fortress. In December 1845, he was appointed as governor of Mosul, and in March 1846, he became the first head of the newly established Zaptiye (Public Order) Ministry. He held that post until February–March 1847.

Afterwards, he was appointed governor of Yanya in April–May 1847, Üsküp in March 1848, Bosnia in June–July 1849, and Edirne in September–October 1849. He was dismissed from the Edirne governorship in July 1851.

In April 1852, he became governor of Konya and in July 1854, governor of Trabzon. In early 1855, during the Crimean War, he led provincial troops to support the defense of Erzurum and Kars. After returning to Trabzon, internal administrative issues and misconduct by local notables led to his dismissal in 1855/56.

In 1859/60, he was appointed president of the Muhacirin Commission which was formed to handle the settlement of Circassian immigrants in the Ottoman Empire. In December 1862, he was appointed Şeyhü’l-Harem (Chief of the Holy Mosque) in Medina. He was dismissed in April 1864 but remained in Medina until his death on 3 May 1866.

== Assessment ==
According to the Ottoman biographical dictionary Sicill-i Osmani:

He was pious and honest. He was also interested in the production of artillery and firearms. His son, Sami Bey, disappeared on his way to Baghdad in 1858/59. His other son, Sadeddin Pasha, was a general (Ferik) and reserve commander in İzmit. His daughter was married to Ömer Pasha.

== Governorships ==
Governorships of Hafız Mehmed Pasha are given below:

- Erzurum (1839–1841)
- Belgrade Fortress (1843–1846)
- Head of Zaptiye (1846–1847)
- Yanya (1847–1848)
- Üsküp (Kosovo) (1848–1850)
- Bosnia (1850)
- Edirne (1850–1851)
- Konya (1852–1854)
- Trabzon (1854–1855)
