= Ali Rıza Pasha (governor of Baghdad) =

19th-century Ottoman general

Governor of Ottoman Baghdad
- In office 1831–1842
- Monarchs: Mahmud II, Abdulmejid I
- Preceded by: Dawud Pasha
- Succeeded by: Mehmed Necib Pasha

Governor of Ottoman Syria
- Incumbent
- Assumed office 1842

Governor of Aleppo

Governor of Diyarbekir

Governor of Mosul

Personal details
- Spouses: First wife (in Aleppo); Salma Khatun
- Children: Daughter (married Izzet Ahmed Pasha)
- Profession: Military officer

Military service
- Branch/service: Ottoman Army

Ali Rıza Pasha (sometimes spelled Ali Ridha Pasha) was an Ottoman general and Vali of Ottoman Baghdad from 1831 to 1842, replacing the Georgian Mamluk Dynasty which had ruled Iraq up until that time.

== Biography ==
Ali Rıza was originally from Trabzon near the Black Sea, and belonged to the Laz people, which is why he was attributed to it but also had features that the Tatar people had. Ali Pasha was considered a follower of the Islamic Sufi Bektashi Order. Reportedly an alcohol addict, he kept his first wife in Aleppo when he came to Baghdad, and two months after his arrival, he married a girl named Salma Khatun, a Mamluk girl in Baghdad of Kurdish origin.

=== Military and political career ===
By the early 19th century, the Ottoman Empire had wanted to regain control over what was then Mamluk Iraq. Continuous rebellions against the Pashas, as well as the danger from Iranians wanting to conquer Iraq led Sultan Mahmud II to decide to replace the then-governor of Baghdad, Dawud Pasha, with a new governor. Eventually, Ali Rıza Pasha led the Ottoman army in 1831 against the mamluk ruler in Baghdad after Dawud Pasha refused to give up his office. Ali Rıza Pasha captured the city and Dawud Pasha, ending the mamluk state rule in Baghdad. Baghdad fell in September 1831 after a ten-week-long blockade of the city which caused mass famine in the city.

Ali Rıza Pasha then marched his army south to Basra where he occupied the province ending mamluk rule in 1834. Ali Rıza Pasha's conquest of Baghdad and Basra brought the provinces under direct rule from Istanbul and subjected them to Tanzimat reforms. Ali Rıza Pasha replaced mamluk ruler Dawud Pasha and exiled him to Brusah. After Dawud's departure from the city, Ali Rıza was credited with the return of trade and end to crime. For a short time he was able to control the mafia that was able to control these regions and especially Karbala in the vacuum of a region without government. He promised appointments and estates to mamluk notables and continued past privileges of the East India Company.

In the summer of 1835, Ali Rıza Pasha attempted to attack the town of Karbala with an army of 3,000. Karbala is an important shrine town in Iraq because Imam Husayn, the grandson of the Islamic prophet Muhammad, is buried there. Karbala is also economically significant because it may levy taxes on pilgrims and earns a significant profit for the local government. Ali Rıza Pasha was unable to keep control of Karbala however. Although he was a member of a Shi'i Islam-influenced Bektashi Order and sympathized with Iraqi Shi'i Muslims generally, Rıza Pasha was opposed by the so-called Shi'i mafia and gangs in Karbala over the appointment of the town's governor. The problems in Karbala were heightened by pressure from the British Empire, who wanted to remain the imperial power of the Awadh government, and the essential link in the Iraqis' communication to the outside world. The serial governor Izzet Ahmed Pasha married his daughter, becoming his son-in-law.

== Governor of Baghdad ==
While Ali Rıza Pasha was able to capture Baghdad and unseat Dawud Pasha, he still had to deal with the mamluks who remained in Baghdad. In order to preserve his power and pacify the mamluks, he gave many of them positions in his government. In the days following his conquest of Baghdad, Ali Rıza Pasha published a firman, or royal decree, which made him the governing authority over the cities of: Baghdad, Aleppo, Diyarbakr, and Mosul. The firman eventually covered all cities in Iraq.

Ali Rıza Pasha had several assistants that he assigned to rule Baghdad. Among them were three that were named Ali Agha al-Yasraji, Abd al-Qadir bin Ziyadah al-Mawsili, and Ali Effendi, who was known in Baghdad as Mullah Ali al-Khasi. They were noted for never treating Baghdadis well which led to a popular protest led by 'Abd al-Ghani al-Jamil. However, Ali Rıza Pasha was able to put down this popular revolution that swept through Baghdad. The Pasha was the first Ottoman governor to allow the holding of Husseini mourning councils publicly as shown in 1832 when the governor attended a mourning council for a family of Shi'i Muslim background.

Ali Rıza Pasha appointed ‘Abd al-Wahhab in charge of the city of Baghdad. In 1842, after eleven years of governing, Ali Rıza Pasha was replaced by Mehmed Necib Pasha. Ali Rıza Pasha was transferred from Baghdad to Syria.

== Personal life ==
Not much is known about Ali Rıza Pasha's personality unlike his political and military achievements. His personality is recounted in a Judeo-Iraqi folksong as very courageous and is even likened to that of a lion, but he was most likely admired by Jews because he replaced Dawud Pasha and redistributed land to people living in Karbala. A different account of Ali Rıza Pasha is given by a Scottish traveler named James Baillie Fraser who visit Iraq in the mid-1800s. Fraser describes Ali Rıza Pasha as “a fat man about fifty years of age, clad in a fur beneesh, with a fez upon his head.” The description of Ali Rıza Pasha continues with Fraser explaining "His mind is not more attractive than the casket which enshrines it. He is weak of judgment, infirm of purpose, irresolute in action, gross in his appetites, selfish and avaricious."
