= Wadie Jwaideh =

Wadie Elias Jwaideh (1 July 1916 – 9 March 2001) was an Iraqi American professor of history known for his work on the Kurds.

== Biography ==
Jwaideh was born in the southern Iraqi city of Basra, into an Arabic-speaking Christian family that later moved to Baghdad. In 1942 he received a Licentiate in Law from the University of Baghdad and in 1960 a Ph.D. from Syracuse University's Maxwell School of Citizenship and Public Affairs. During this time, he also held a lecturer position in Arabic at Johns Hopkins University. After graduating he joined the faculty of Indiana University as a history professor, where he founded the Department of Near Eastern Languages and Literature. He retired in 1985 and moved to San Diego where he was an adjunct professor of history at the University of California, San Diego until 1990. An annual lecture is given in his honor at Indiana University.

== Jwaideh and the Kurds ==
His book "The Kurdish National Movement" was selected as a Choice Outstanding Academic Title for 2006. The book was published in book form by Syracuse University Press, 46 years after it was published as a Ph.D. thesis, which had long been known to and cited by scholars. Jwaideh understood the Kurdish socio-political system as operating at a tribal (aşiret) level before the twentieth century. According to Jwaideh, individual Kurdish leaders who attained political power did so within wider Muslim political structures, not within the Kurdish community. In Jwaideh's view, Kurdish identity is fundamentally tribal, and more secular than religious. While acknowledging the "classic" status of Jwaideh's Kurdish National Movement, M. Hakan Yavuz says that Jwasdeh's characterization of Kurdish identity as predominantly secular is fundamentally different from Kemalist secularism.

== Books ==
- The Kurdish National Movement: Its Origins and Development: Syracuse University Press. 2004.
- The Introductory Chapters of Yaqut's Mu'jam Al-Buldan by Yāqūt ibn ʻAbd Allāh al-Ḥamawī / Wadie Jwaideh (Jan 1, 1959).
- Islamic and Middle Eastern societies : a festchrift in honor of Professor Wadie Jwaideh (1987) Amana Books ISBN 0915597292
- al-Idrīsī: [Chicago] Encyclopædia Britannica, 1974.
- Wadie Jwaideh collection, Consists mainly of photocopies of British Foreign Office dispatches from the period between 1836 and 1924.
