= Abdurrahman Pasha Baban =

- Emir
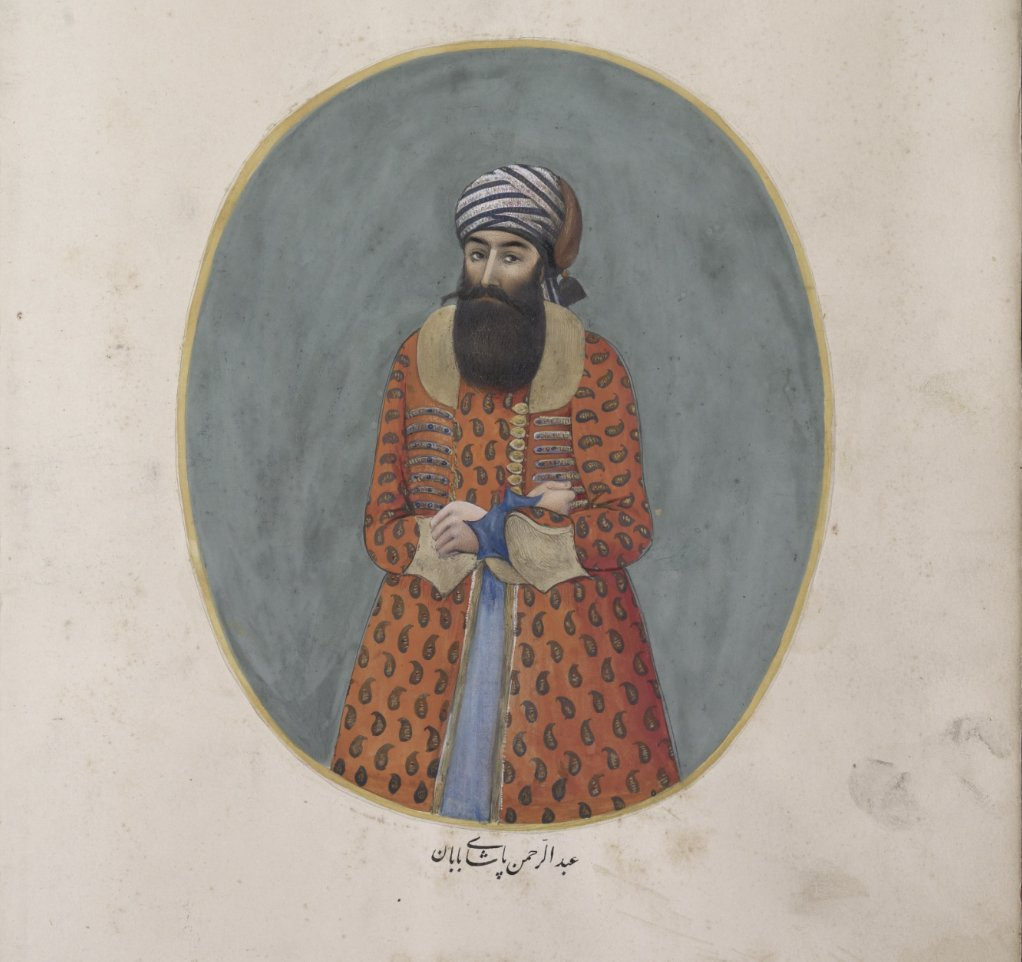
- Reign: 1789/1803 - 1813
- Predecessor: Ibrahim Pasha Baban
- Successor: Mahmud II of Baban
- Born: Suleymaniyah, Baban, Ottoman Empire
- Died: 22 August 1813
- Dynasty: Baban
- Father: Mahmud Pasha Baban

Abdurrahman Pasha Baban (Kurdish: عەبدوڕڕەحمان پاشا بابان, romanized: 'ebdwrreḧman paşa baban) also known as Awrahman Pasha Baban (Kurdish: ئەورەحمان پاشای بابان, romanized: Ewrehiman Paşay Baban) was the emir of the Kurdish Baban principality either from 1789 or 1803 to his death in 1813. He is known for his revolt and multiple battles against neighbouring emirates in the Ottoman Empire.

== Life ==
Abdurrahman Pasha was the son of Mahmud Pasha Baban, one of the most famous Kurdish princes. During his reign, the Baban Emirate faced many major political and military changes. He soon realized that the narrow borders of the region and the lack of direct contact with the Ottoman Sultan were two major threats to the Kurds and the Baban Emirate. Therefore, during his lifetime, he tried several times to expand the borders of the Baban Emirate and have an armed force so that the governor of Baghdad could not interfere in his affairs. The long-standing conflict between the Iranian and Ottoman states and the disagreements between the Baban chieftains buried this wish of Abdurrahman. In fact the disagreements turned so bad that in 1805, a coalition of Ottomans, Mamluks and a renegade of his own family members, led by Khalid Pasha Baban, forces Abdurrahman to flee to Persia. Khalid Pahsa briefly assumes leadership of the Baban Emirate. However his reign is short-lived and a year later, with the support of the shah of Persia, Fath-Ali Shah Qajar, Abdurrahman returns to power in Suleymaniah, the capital of Baban. During his reign Abdurrahman was forced to flee Suleymaniah no less than five times. Abdurrahman died on the 22.08.1813.

== Revolt ==
In 1806, Abdurrahman Pasha held a rebellion. Some Kurdish historians consider this the first revolt with nationalist sentiments, however, his real intent was to expand his realm in expense of the vali of Baghdad and he tried to be the only power in the province with the approval of the sultan and with the economic and military power he had in hand, not an independent Kurdistan. As the British resident J.C. Rich, who was a close friend of Abdurrahman Pasha, puts it, the Pasha did not seek full independence, he only wished "to render his country tributary to the Porte, but independent of any neighbouring Pasha". The reason for this revolt was because when Ibrahim Pasha, whom was Abdrrahman's uncle, died. The Ottoman authority placed a rival tribe member as Emir. In June 1810, Abdurrahman Pasha marched towards Baghdad to overthrow the semi-independent Governor Kücük Süleyman Pasha, who had not paid tribute to Istanbul. The forces of the Baghdad army launched a violent attack on Abdurrahman Pasha's army which scattered his forces, many of whom joined the Baghdad army or Khalid Pasha's army. But in the end Abdurrahman Pasha turned out victorious, as the forces of his forces numbered only 10,000, while, the opposition forces numbered 100,000 and Süleyman Pasha was killed. This battle would be known as the Battle of the Straits, or the Battle of Darband. This victory secured Abdurrahman Pasha considerable cachet in Istanbul. Upon his return, he was appointed as Kethüda (or steward) to the sultan's inner circle.

== See also ==
- Baban
- Ibrahim Pasha Baban
- Suleymaniyah
- List of Kurdish dynasties and countries
