= Baban =

Former Kurdish principality

Baban Principality بابان
- 16th century–1850
- Status: Vassal state of the Ottoman Empire
- Capital: Kirkuk (1694 - 1783); Sulaymaniyah (1783 - 1850)
- Common languages: Sorani Kurdish, Gorani Kurdish (court language for some times)
- Religion: Shafiʽi Sunni Islam
- Government: Monarchy
- History
  - Established: 16th century
  - Baban revolt suppressed: 1850
Preceded by	Succeeded by
Ottoman Empire	Ottoman Empire

Baban (Kurdish: بابان) was a Kurdish emirate existing from the 16th century to 1850, centered on Sulaymaniyah. The Baban Principality played an active role in the Ottoman-Safavid conflict and gave significant military support to the Ottomans. They were in constant rivalry with Ardalan, Bohtan and Soran and its territory would therefore oscillate. Before the removal of the last Baban leader in 1850, their rule had become limited to their capital Sulaymaniyah and few surrounding villages.

The modern city of Sulaymaniyah was built by Baban in 1784 which served as their capital. Prior to the founding of the city, the dynasty lived in Qala Çolan. The principality also encouraged and facilitated the use of Sorani Kurdish among its local literary authors.

== Origins ==
When the Ottomans arrived to the Sulaymaniyah plains (Shahrizor), the Baban princes had already established themselves in the region. However, there is no pre-Ottoman source on Baban, and their origins are obscure. Information on the relations between Baban and the Soran Emirate up to 1596 exist in Sharafnama, which also mentioned that Pîr Budek Beg was the founder of the dynasty in the early 16th-century. There is no consensus on the dynastic chronology of Baban.

One myth claimed that the founder of the Baban dynasty was Ehmed Feqî (Feqî Ehmed) from Pshdar, who received the land around Shahrizor by the Shah of Iran because of his loyalty to the monarch. Another myth claimed that the dynasty descended from an English woman named Keghan.

== History ==
After the Battle of Chaldiran in 1514, Baban remained unincorporated to the Ottoman Empire. As a representative for the Ottomans, Idris Bitlisi met with the Prince of Baban and other Kurdish states immediately after the Battle of Chaldiran and succeeded in forming an alliance between them against the Safavids. Nonetheless, the loyalty of Baban fluctuated. In the early 1500s, Baban under Haci Şeyh Baban extended its territory around Lake Urmia which forced Tahmasp I to send a military force against the Kurds.

According to Claudius Rich, the dynasty gained Ottoman recognition of the hereditary rights of their dynasty in 1678. From the 1720s to the 1740s, the Baban dynasty aided the Ottomans against Iran. The period from 1750 to 1847 was dominated by rivalry with both Soran and Bohtan, as they also fought against the centralization attempts by the Ottomans and Iran. In the late 1700s, Baban supported the Qajar dynasty against Zand dynasty but had to transfer their support to the Zands after the victories of the latter.

The principality was destroyed during the mid-19th century Ottoman modernization period. The Baban revolt lasted for three years, but was defeated by a coalition of Ottoman forces and Kurdish tribes. Ahmed Baban, the last Baban ruler, was defeated near Koy Sanjaq in 1847 and the region of Shahrizor was annexed to the Ottoman Empire. Iranian claims to Baban ceased after the treaty of 1847.

When the British entered Sulaymaniyah in 1918, the city was no longer under the influence of the Baban dynasty. Some descendants of the dynasty joined the Kurdish independence movement in Iraq, while others became Ottoman politicians.

== List of rulers ==
List of Baban emirs and rulers:

- (1649-1670) Faqi Ahmad
- (1670–1703) Sulaiman Baban
- (1721–1731) Khana Mohammad Pasha
- (1732–1742) Nawaub Khalid Pasha
- (1742–1754) Nawaub Salim Pasha
- (1754–1765) Nawaub Sulaiman Pasha
- (1765–1775) Muhammad Pasha
- (1775–1777) Abdolla Pasha
- (1777–1780) Ahmad Pasha
- (1780–1782) Mahmoud Pasha
- (1782–1803) Ibrahim Pasha Baban
- (1803–1813) Abdulrahman Pasha Baban
- (1813–1834) Mahmoud Pasha
- (1834–1838) Sulaiman Pasha
- (1838–1847) Ahmad Pasha
- (1847–1850) Abdollah Pasha

== See also ==
- Shahrizor Eyalet
- List of Kurdish dynasties and countries
