= Early Kurdish nationalism =

Independence movements of the Kurdish people

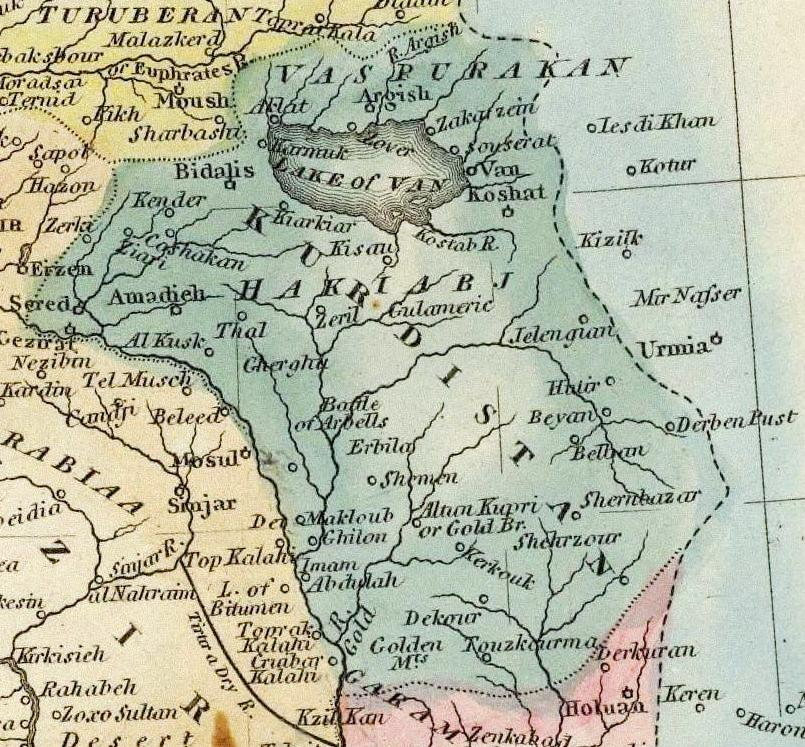
Ottoman Kurdistan, 1823

The nationalist movement ( also known as the Pan-Kurdism ) among the Kurdish people first emerged in the late 19th century with an uprising in 1880 led by Sheik Ubeydullah. Many Kurds worked with other opponents of the Ottoman regime within the Committee of Union and Progress (CUP). A growth in ethnic consciousness at the start of the 20th century was spearheaded by the Society for the Elevation of Kurdistan. Some Kurdish nationalist groups agitated for secession, others for autonomy.

During the First World War, while some Kurdish nationalists were working with the British and Russian enemy powers, Kurdish tribal forces were fighting alongside Ottoman troops on the Russian front. Deaths and displacements occurred on a large scale among Kurdish civilians due to wartime conditions and deliberate ethnic cleansing policies.

There was a brief opportunity for Kurdish nationalism after World War I with the dissolution of the Ottoman Empire. Western powers (particularly the United Kingdom) promised the Kurds they would act as guarantors for Kurdish freedom, a promise they subsequently broke. Some of the autonomist Kurdish groups received British support leading up to the Treaty of Sèvres (1920), which prepared for local autonomy for the Kurdish regions and envisaged later independence. Opposition from Kemal Atatürk, leader of the new nation-state of Turkey, and changes in British policy, prevented such a result. Following the Treaty of Lausanne (1923) the Kurdish territory was partitioned between Turkey, the French mandate of Syria, the British mandate of Iraq, and Persia.

== Prior to 1914 ==
The nationalist movement among the Kurds first emerged in the late 19th century with the uprising of Sheikh Ubeydullah, a Kurdish landowner and head of the powerful Şemdinan family. In 1880, Ubeydullah demanded political autonomy or outright independence for Kurds and the recognition of a Kurdistan state separate from both the Ottoman Empire and Qajar Persia. The uprising was suppressed by the Ottomans.

The first Kurds to challenge the authority of the Ottoman Empire did so primarily as Ottoman subjects, rather than Kurds. They worked with other Turks and Ottoman subjects who were in opposition to the policies of Sultan Abdul Hamid and in 1889 formed the Committee of Union and Progress (CUP). Abdul Hamid responded with a policy of repression, but also of integration, co-opting prominent Kurdish opponents into the Ottoman power structure with prestigious positions in his government. This repression could be extremely violent, as Ottoman authorities executed leading Kurdish tribal chiefs, including those of the Mir Mahmali, Mir Yusifi, and Pusht Gali groups and eliminated influential figures such as Hamza Agha of the Mamish, along with much of his family, to break resistance and consolidate control. This strategy appears successful given the loyalty displayed by the Kurdish Hamidiye regiments during World War I.

In the first decade of the 20th century, Kurdish nationalism was still an ambiguous, controversial, or unfamiliar concept for many Kurds. Educated Kurds, primarily from Istanbul, sought a political solution largely within the confines of the Ottoman Empire and one that did not rest solely on an ethnic basis. That kind of identity was related with a more tribal consciousness; one that lacked sophistication for many. Others had much to lose if the status quo was altered. For many, this stemmed from a religious concern, where the Sultan had long brought Muslims under a secure Caliphate. Others, particularly tribal chieftains, had economic concerns. Still other Kurds, especially those outside of Anatolia, lacked understanding of nationalism or were simply unaware and unaffected.

In the short time of its existence, the Kurd Society for Cooperation and Progress (Kürt Terraki ve Teavun Cemiyeti) was a leading force in supporting the Kurdish nation. It was founded in the aftermath of the Young Turk Revolution in 1908 by several members of the Kurdish political elite. Some of the co-founders were founders Sheikh Abdulkadir, (a son of Sheikh Ubeydullah); Emin Ali Bedir Khan of the Bedir Khan family and the former Ottoman official Muhammad Şerif Pasha. With the establishment of.a school it has also supported the education of the Kurdish population in Istanbul, which at the time amounted to around 30'000. The institution was attended by Said Nursi, who in the future was to become the leader of the Nurculuk. The society also continued to distribute the newspaper Kurdistan, which was led by members of the Bedir Khan family. In 1909, the Society was prohibited by the Government, who didn't see a benefit in the organization of Kurdish people.

An organization known as the Society for the Elevation of Kurdistan (Kürdistan Teali Cemiyeti) was central to the forging of a distinct Kurdish identity. It took advantage of the period of political liberalization during the Second Constitutional Era (1908–1920) of Turkey to transform a renewed interest in Kurdish culture and language into a political nationalist movement based on ethnicity. The emphasis on the Kurdish people as a distinct ethnic group was encouraged around the start of the 20th century by Russian anthropologists who suggested that the Kurds were a European race (compared to the Asiatic Turks), based on physical characteristics and their language which is part of the Indo-European language group. Based more on this ethno-nationalistic standpoint, two prominent Kurdish families, the Badr Khans and the Sayyids, renewed opposition to the empire. These two houses founded the first two strains of Kurdish nationalism. The Badr Khans were secessionists while the Sayyids of Nihiri were autonomists.

Operating within the autonomist framework, Shaykh Abd al Qadir in 1910 appealed to the Committee on Union and Progress (which, after the 1908 Young Turk Revolution, now held the power of the government after deposing Sultan Abd al Hamid) for an autonomous Kurdish state in the east. That same year, Said Nursi traveled through the Diyarbakir region and urged Kurds to unite and forget their differences, while still carefully claiming loyalty to the CUP. Other Kurdish Shaykhs in the region began leaning towards regional autonomy.

During this time, the Badr Khans had been in contact with discontented Shaykhs and chieftains in the far east of Anatolia ranging to the Iranian border, more in the framework of secession, however. Shayk Abd al Razzaq Badr Khan eventually formed an alliance with Shaykh Taha and Shaykh Abd al Salam Barzani, another powerful family in Kurdistan. Because of this possible Kurdish threat as well as the alliance's dealings with Russia, Ottoman troops moved against this alliance in 1914. Two brief and minor rebellions, the rebellions of Barzan and Bitlis, were quickly suppressed.

The problem for these early Kurdish rebels was one of coordination. The British vice-consul in Bitlis reported that "Could the Kurds combine against the government even in one province, the Turkish troops in their eastern part of Asia Minor would find it difficult to crush the revolt." (p. 101)

== The First World War ==
The outbreak of World War I was a powerful check to growing Kurdish nationalism. However, some Kurds continued to work behind the scenes for an independent Kurdistan. These represent some of the first attempts by Kurds to work with foreign powers against Turks for their autonomy. In 1914, General Muhammad Sharif Pasha offered his services to the British in Mesopotamia. Elsewhere, members of the Badr Khan family held close relations with Russian officials and discussed their intentions to form an independent Kurdistan.

Meanwhile, the conflict between Kurds and Armenians in the east raged. Kurds were threatened with punishment by Ottoman authorities if they did not obey orders to evict or kill the Armenians. In rare instances, Kurds spared their Christian victims and protected them because they were neighbors with whom they had held cordial relations. It is difficult to accept that the struggle was a purely ethnic one. The Armenians, it was reasoned, presented a real threat for many Kurds, especially the farther one went east. Armenians, after all, had relationships with the hostile European powers and Russia. According to David McDowall, "most Kurds involved in the massacres probably felt it was a question of 'them or us'". (p. 105)

Kurds contributed significantly to the Ottoman Empire's war effort. Tribal forces served against the Russian army in Persia and Turkey. Kurdish battle casualties are estimated at 300,000. However, the effect of the war on the Kurdish populated areas was more severe. Many regions throughout Kurdistan were laid waste and their populations decimated by advancing and retreating troop forces. Furthermore, as the war continued, the Young Turks implemented large scale ethnic cleansing of both Armenians and Kurds, including the deportation of Kurds from Erzurum and Bitlis in the winter of 1916. By the end of World War I, up to 700,000 Kurds had been forcibly deported and almost half of the displaced perished. Nevertheless, at this time the Ottoman Kurds still had the legal right to conduct their affairs in Kurdish, celebrate unique traditions, and identify themselves as a distinct ethnic group.

== The end of the Ottoman Empire ==
The Kurdish ethnonationalist movement that emerged following World War I and the end of the Ottoman Empire was largely in reaction to the changes taking place in mainstream Turkey, primarily radical secularization which the strongly Muslim Kurds abhorred, centralization of authority which threatened the power of local chieftains and Kurdish autonomy, and rampant Turkish nationalism in the new Turkish Republic which obviously threatened to marginalize them.

In 1918, the prominent Kurdish nationalist Şerif Pasha pressed the British to adopt a policy supporting autonomous Kurdish regions throughout Kurdistan. He suggested that British officials be charged with appointing officials to administer the regions and control their finances. Strategically, he desired movement towards this plan to be made before the end of the war and the Paris Peace Conference. Şerif was not able to convince the British of this. However, his efforts to plead the cause of his people leading up to the Peace Conference impressed Western powers. Because of his friendship with Armenians, after he was chosen to represent the Kurds by various Kurdish nationalist organizations at the Peace Conference, a Kurdo-Armenian peace accord was reached between Şerif and Armenian representatives at the conference in 1919. The British persuaded the Kurdish and Armenian representatives to sign this Kurdish-Armenian declaration of solidarity against the Kemalists for strategic reasons. The British thought this would increase the likelihood of independent Kurdish and Armenian states that would create a buffer between British Mesopotamia and the Turks.

In the aftermath of World War I, Persian Kurdistan went into widespread instability, with British officials describing the region as bordering on chaos and difficult to control or even fully understand. This stemmed from both Kurdish opposition to the return of Assyrian and Armenian refugees, often fueled by pan Islamic influences, and a deep dissatisfaction with Persian rule, which was widely perceived as weak and incapable of maintaining authority. Together, these factors intensified regional tensions and contributed to the growing momentum behind Kurdish nationalist aspirations and resistance to external control.

The first opportunity for the Kurds to establish an independent state came with the collapse of the Ottoman Empire and the end of the First World War. In his Fourteen Points Programme for World Peace, US President Woodrow Wilson included the statement that non-Turkish minorities of the Ottoman Empire should be "assured of an absolute unmolested opportunity of autonomous development". Aside from the supporters of such sentiments in the US, Britain, France, and of course of Kurds, there were other aspects to consider. These included the operational breakup of the Ottoman Empire, the Kemalist movement, Russia's territorial ambitions, the status of the Christian Armenian population, and Britain's desire to preserve stability in and around its colonial possessions.

=== Anatolia ===
Turkish forces often broke the terms of the Armistice by arming Kurdish forces in eastern Anatolia. Turkish forces were able to stir up religious resentment among Kurds against Christian Armenians in a desire to create an effective Kurdish buffer between Turkey and a possible Armenian state, or obviate its creation altogether. Much of this groundwork was performed by 'Ali Ihsan Pasha.

Elsewhere, anti-British sentiment was developed by 'Ali Beg and his Turco-Kurdish independence party, and the Kurdish Club, which Edward William Charles Noel claimed was plagued with corruption and self-seeking individuals who were also members of the Turkish CUP.

Following the Treaty of Mudros, Istanbul's Kurds began resurrecting their nationalist groups. By the end of 1918, Shaykh Abd al Qadir of the Badr Khans and others reconstituted the Kurdish Club under the new title of Society for the Rise of Kurdistan. But to many, including the British, it was unclear exactly who and what the Kurdish Club and its affiliates in the provinces represented.

Understanding the threat that these renewed Kurdish clubs represented if allied with the British (who had by now made it clear that they were leaning towards providing an autonomous Kurdish state), the CUP began advocating policies of decentralization and penetrated these Kurdish clubs in order to maintain their loyalty. Furthermore, Kurdish nationalism was then tactically supported in eastern regions. While inspiring Sunni solidarity among the Kurds, they worked to foment anti-British sentiment among the Kurds.

By 1919, two developments destroyed Kurdish hopes of achieving either autonomy or independence in eastern Anatolia. The Greeks landed at Smyrna and the Italians invaded further south in Antalya. The psychological effect that these foreign, Christian invasions had on the Muslim Kurdish population was significant and inevitable. Ideas of nationalism were instantly eclipsed by the Christian threat and the Ottoman government easily mobilized Kurds under Pan-Islamic unity. The second disaster was the rise of Mustafa Kemal. He militantly voiced concern for the safety of the sultanate and called for the preservation of eastern Anatolia against the Christian threat. This likewise had a similar effect on Kurds. Kemalist power grew throughout 1919. With this growth, came persecution of the Kurds and the narrowing of Kurdish political space. A new Kurdish political party was refused registration. Newspapers related calls for Kurdish independence with that of supporting Armenian nationalism as well. Outspoken Kurds were imprisoned or executed for treasonous statements. In 1920, the National Pact was signed.

=== Treaty of Sèvres ===
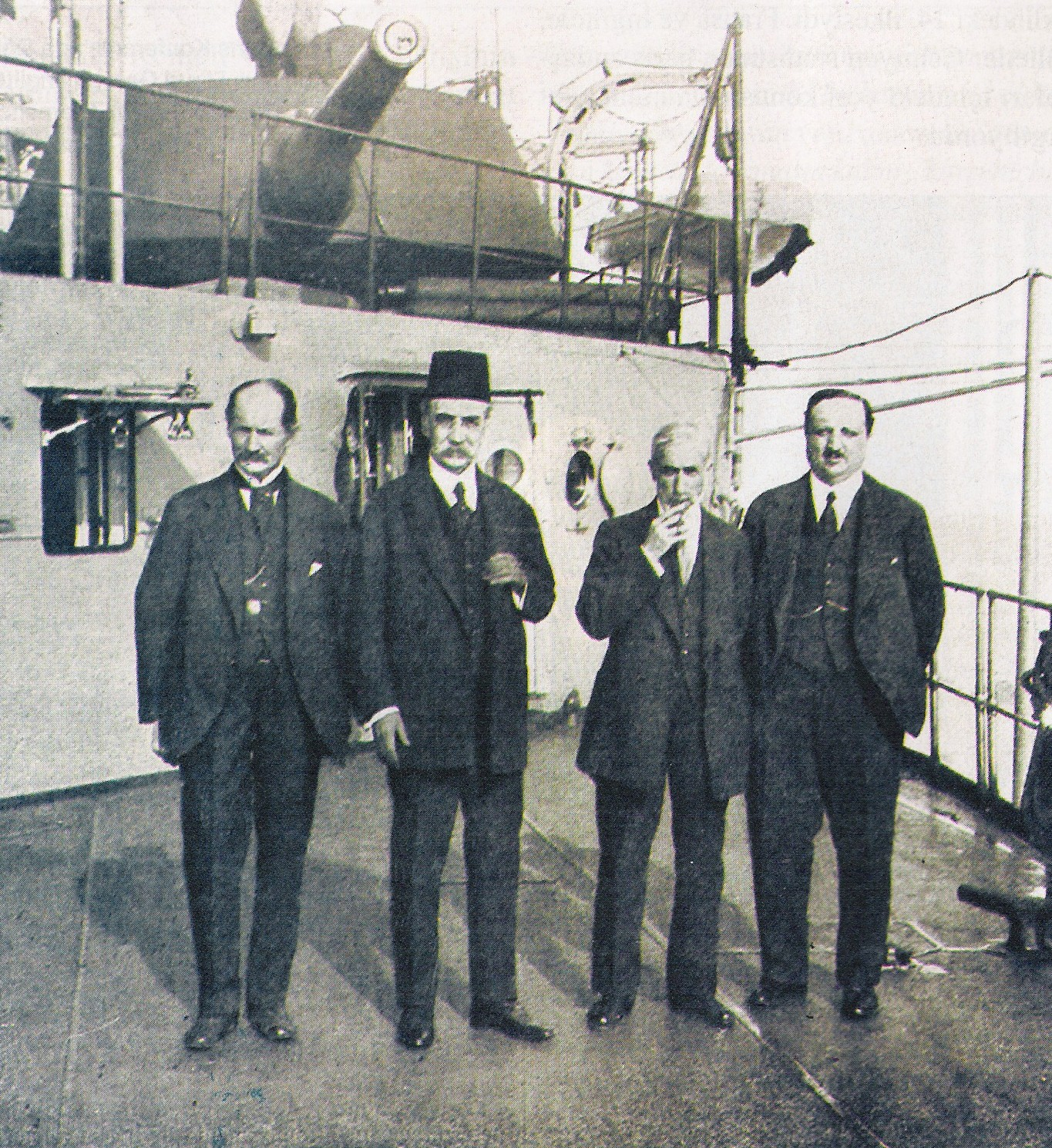
The signatories of the Treaty of Sèvres, 1920

Leading up to the Treaty of Sèvres, in addition to the inability of Kurds to produce a credible leadership, a big failure in reaching a better understanding of an autonomous Kurdish state was due simply to the amount of time that passed between Mudros in 1918 and Sèvres in 1920. Kurds were provided with little alternative by the British. After the Greek attempts in Anatolia, the rise of the Kemalists, and a growing perceived Armenian threat, Anatolian Kurds lacked nationalistic, secessionist desires.

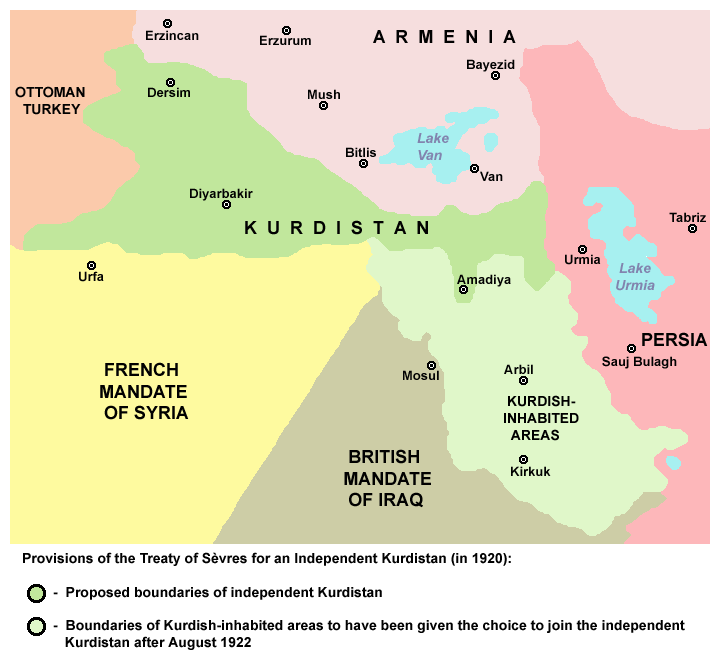
Provisions of the Treaty of Sèvres for an independent Kurdistan, 1920.

The Treaty was signed between the Allied powers and the government in Istanbul, despite the growing power and authority of the government and the authority of the Grand National Assembly in Ankara. The government in Istanbul was compelled to sign the Treaty even though they themselves strongly disapproved of the terms.

In the eyes of the Kurds, Sharif Pasha’s efforts at the Peace Conference seemed to be flourishing but the treaty had its flaws. The treaty excluded the Kurdish territories in Syria, the part of the Dersim region lying west of the Euphrates, and the failure to demarcate a boundary between the Kurds and the Armenians. However, these flaws were minor and dominated by "the fundamental fact that the treaty had been forced upon an unwilling and token government that lacked a constituency even in Istanbul." (p. 137)

Section III of the treaty includes all information related to the issue of an autonomous state of Kurdistan in articles 62 – 64. Under article 62, British, French, and Italian officials were assigned to draft within six months of the implementation of the treaty "a scheme of local autonomy for the predominantly Kurdish areas". Article 64 explicitly states that Kurdish regions have the right to proclaim independence from Turkey or other regions ruled over by the Principal Allied Powers in any part of Kurdistan.

The Treaty of Sèvres was signed on August 10, 1920. Supporters of the Kurdish military leader Colonel Halid Beg Cibran and other Kurdish nationalists began advocating against the Kemalists and Turkish nationalist sentiments in fear that those sentiments would betray their own interests in an independent Kurdistan. Halid Beg Cibran traveled throughout parts of eastern Anatolia garnering support for his cause, at times using violent coercion against non-supportive Kurdish Alevi tribes.

=== Koçgiri rebellion ===
Elsewhere, the Koçgiri rebellion fully erupted in the Dersim region in November 1920. During this time, the Kemalist government in Ankara was attempting to influence Kurds to join the Turkish nationalistic cause by offering jobs and bribes. Throughout 1920, Kurdish organizers in the Dersim region were increasingly successful in tribal organization for an autonomous Kurdistan against the Kemalists, even though many in the region supported the Kemalists. During the summer months, Kurdish armed forces in the region began attacking Turkish ammunition sites and police stations. By November, three months after the signing of the Treaty of Sèvres, Kurds were demanding official recognition for their autonomy. However, winter stifled their ability to organize and armed operations ceased. During this time, Kemalists were able to surround the region and co-opt many Kurdish tribal leaders and bring them into the Kemalist camp.

Clashes erupted again as early as January 1921. With their new position of advantage, Turkish Kemalists arrested and deported Kurdish nationalists and demanded the unconditional surrender of the Kurdish forces that they met, threatening the destruction of their villages if they did not cooperate. Yet, Kurdish forces won several important battles and gained important footholds in the region by March. These successes prompted an increased response from Ankara. By April, the Kurdish rebellion was decisively put down. Reasons behind the Koçgiri rebellion were both ideological and strategic. The main reason for Kurdish support for the rebellion was in order to implement articles 62-64 of the Treaty of Sèvres and increase their autonomy in Kurdish Anatolia. Strategically, Kurdish organizers and forces in the region thought they could take advantage of the fledgling Kemalist government as well as its preoccupation with the Greek conflict in the west. The Kurds severely miscalculated in this last respect. There is also evidence that they anticipated foreign support from the French, British, or Greeks. But there is no evidence that they received any. Some Kurdish forces disagreed with requesting foreign support against the Turks as well.

There are four main reasons that the Koçgiri rebellion failed. Firstly, the Kurds received no outside European support. Secondly, the tribal nature of Kurdish society allowed the Kemalists to co-opt tribes and break up the unity of the movement. Thirdly, there were religious and sectarian differences among Kurds (primarily Sunni and Alevi differences) that created mistrust and a weak unity. Lastly, the Turks' military, organizational, and patronage power was overwhelmingly superior. It is unlikely that any of the tribes involved in the revolt had battle experience in World War I. Most of the Kurdish Hamidiye regiments that fought in the Balkans under the Ottoman flag lived further east and south. The Kocgiri rebellion was also located near Ankara was relatively accessible by Turkish forces.

The Koçgiri rebellion had a significant impact on the government of Ankara. The government continued its policy of attempting to win over Kurdish tribal leaders but set up special commissions to investigate the rebellion. A draft law came before the Grand National Assembly in February 1922 that dealt with administering the Kurdish regions. Because of its superficial nature in dealing with Kurdish autonomy, most Kurdish deputies in the Grand National Assembly opposed it. In his analysis of the draft law, Rober Olson claims that Kurdish opposition to the law reveals that these Kurdish Kemalists were hopeful of obtaining greater autonomy for the Kurds. He also claims that the draft law and its overwhelming majority support reveals that at the time Turks in the Assembly did not favor a violent policy towards the Kurds, but that they "did not remotely consider independence or even autonomy in any meaningful sense of that term" for the Kurds (p. 41).

=== Iraq ===
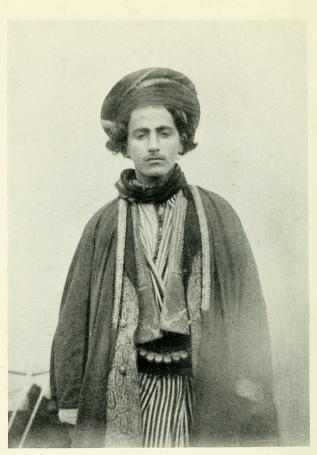
A Kurdish Jaff tribal chief, Mesopotamia, 1914

First direct contact with Kurds in Iraq and British was in 1917 after the British occupied Khanaqin and later other regions in the north of present Iraq, including Kifri, Tuz Khurmatu, and Kirkuk. In 1918, the first Kurdish troops to fight against the Turks were employed by the British. After further British success in the region, Kurdish tribal leaders were impressed and sought to cast their support behind the British effort. Kurdish notables, including Shaykh Mahmud, agreed that they would further seek support from the British for an autonomous state under the British occupied territory.

The Kurdish enthusiasm was not matched by the British. They began withdrawing from Kirkuk and the surrounding regions in May 1918. These areas were promptly reoccupied by Turkish forces. This reoccupation by Turkish forces resulted in much retribution for the Kurds in the region. The British withdrawal was a severe blow to British prestige and ridiculed Kurdish leaders who had spoken in support of the British. Kurds would remain suspicious and doubtful of British power and their intention years after World War I ended.

Indeed, Turkish propaganda against the British was not limited to just Eastern Anatolia and Persia. They had a strong presence in the Mosul wilayat of south Kurdistan. In 'Amadiya, Kurds were more easily influenced against the British because the British were a new, foreign presence in their land. Many Kurdish chieftains in the region, far from Istanbul, preferred the old scheme of things under the Ottomans, where they had enjoyed semi-autonomy. New administrative measures under the British, including the collection of taxes and the repatriation of Assyrian refugees agitated the 'Amadiya Kurds. After this agitation and pressure by Turkish inciters, Kurds in the region revolted against the British. This revolt was summarily put down, however, by 1919. Minor revolts of this kind broke out sporadically over the coming years in the Mosul region.

=== Syria ===
During the conflict between Kemalists and the Kurds and the Turkish war of independence in the 1920s many Kurds fled to Syria from Turkey to escape oppression. These refugees settled mainly in the Jazira region of northern Syria where formerly nomadic Kurds had already settled decades earlier and become agriculturalists. Unified Kurdish political activity in Syria was relatively undeveloped and sparse. During the Turkish war of independence, Kurdish tribes in Jazira assisted French forces in repelling Turkish advances. The French at this time had considered the creation of a Kurdish enclave stretching from Urfa in the west to Cizre in the east.

French policies of decentralization benefited many Kurds in this region at the time because of the increased local power they were given. However, Kurds in Syria were not unified in this position. Many wealthy Kurds in Damascus supported the central authority and status quo under the Ottoman Turks and were not supportive of French decentralization. Other Kurdish tribes supported Syrian independence from the French alongside Arab tribes. This diversity in opinion regarding Kurdish autonomy and relations with the French "hindered the development of Kurdish nationalist political activity in Syria." (p. 28).

== British policy ==
British policy towards the Kurds changed several times between the years of 1918 and 1923, the years between the Armistice of Mudros and the Treaty of Lausanne. The common historical argument is that the abrogation of the Treaty of Sèvres was a result of the success of Kemalist forces and militant Turkish nationalism. However, the evolution of British policy towards the Kurds eventually ran counter to the implementation of articles 62-64 of the Treaty of Sèvres.This policy also tended to strip Kurdish leaders of their traditional role as intermediaries between the government and the people, a position upon which much of their influence and power had long depended on.

After the armistice of Mudros and until the signing of the Treaty of Sèvres in August 1920, British policy toward the Kurds was that of supporting autonomous units throughout Kurdistan. Kurdish nationalism and autonomy throughout Kurdish populated regions was supported heavily by British intelligence agent Edward William Charles Noel during this time. But the growing strength of Turkish nationalist forces by 1920 undermined Noel's policy ambitions, especially in the north.

The British grew further hesitant to establish a "quasi-autonomous" independent Kurdistan in the south because of the possibility that the French would respond by establishing a similar state with French advisers in the north.

=== Sheikh Mahmud's rebellions ===
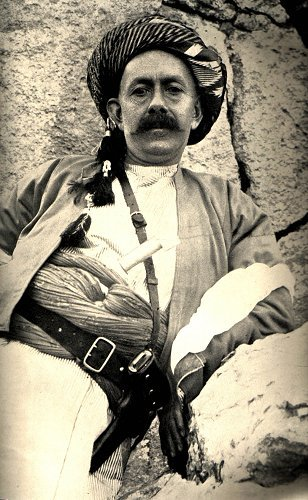
Mahmud Barzanji in 1919

After World War I and after full Turkish evacuation of southern Kurdistan, Britain reached an agreement with Sheikh Mahmud Barzanji and other Kurdish notables on what was later called 'The Tribal System' or 'The Sandeman System' named after Sir Robert Groves Sandeman. It was based on the principle of indirect rule. Tribal chieftains were entrusted with the government of their own tribes and were made responsible for British administrative duties through Sheikh Mahmud. They were recognized and paid as British government officials. This region of south Kurdistan became known as the South Kurdish Confederation. Many other Kurdish tribes soon agreed to join this system. After years of war and struggle, they were eager to join a peaceful settlement that might offer them protection and financial support.

This system eventually fell apart due to disagreements between Sheikh Mahmud and the British. The British had created quite a powerful Kurdish leader through their financial support. Sheikh Mahmud developed a very opportunistic strategy towards the British. After building up so much power in the region, Sheikh Mahmud eventually started an all out rebellion against the British after they attempted to curb his unruly behavior. The Sheikh and his followers were defeated in June 1919.

The Sheikh by no means commanded the support of all Kurds in the confederation. The Sheikh's call to arms against the British under nationalism and Islam proved mostly futile. Kurds in southern Kurdistan were too unfamiliar with the concept of nationalism. And their past experiences under the Sultan with jihad during World War I for four years against the British had proved a failure.

=== The Air Scheme ===
An aspect that ultimately spelled the downfall for a British policy supporting an autonomous Kurdistan was the Air Scheme policy. This policy of using primarily the Royal Air Force as the dominant military presence in Mesopotamia was experimental at the time. The Air Scheme was popular among British policymakers. The biggest proponents of the Air Scheme were also among the biggest supporters of a "Greater Iraq." The preference in early 1920 strategy was to include southern Kurdistan under the auspices of the British Air Scheme. British policy at this point still regarded northern Kurdistan as would be described in articles 62-64 of the Treaty of Sèvres.

However, in policy meetings that took place in Cairo in March 1921 British policy towards the Kurds was altered. The newly formed Middle East Department concluded that "purely Kurdish areas should not be included in the Arab state of Mesopotamia". The framers of this policy stated that Kurdish areas would be put under control of the British High Commission and not under control of any Iraqi government. Noel and others supported this position because they thought Kurds would prefer rule closer to home and rule that was not under Arabs or Turks. This position was also thought to be strategic because an autonomous Kurdistan would create a buffer between the Turks outside of Iraq as well as anti-British movements within Iraq. Winston Churchill, the Secretary of Colonies at the time, agreed with these sentiments and this position. Churchill also feared that a future ruler of Iraq would oppress the Kurdish minority.

In the end, this policy was reversed largely by the work of Sir Percy Cox, the first High Commissioner of Iraq. Over time, Cox became convinced that it was best to include southern Kurdistan as an integral part of Iraq, for financial and fiscal purposes. Under the impression that such a policy would not go against the policy adopted in Cairo, Churchill agreed to this new policy. Correspondence shows that Churchill still assumed that the only link between the southern Kurdish regions and Iraq would be through the British High Commission.

As Turkish forces grew in strength and militancy, Cox began dealing with King Faisal I of Iraq in determining how Kurds in southern Kurdistan should be incorporated into Iraq territorially and politically. Cox and Faisal devised a policy whereby Kurdish regions could decide whether or not to join Iraq politically instead of merely territorially under the High Commission. Cox claimed that two out of the four of these defined Kurdish districts wished to become part of Iraq. Churchill was convinced and went along with the policy and Cox's dealings with Faisal.

== Persia ==
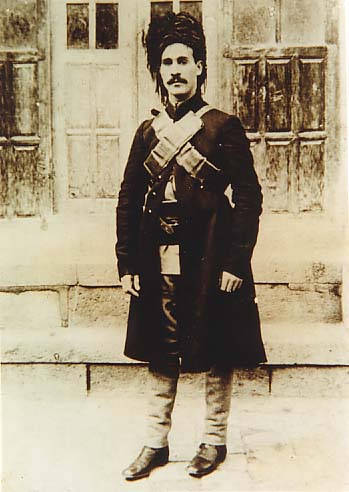
Simko Shikak, leader of the 1922 rebellion in Persia

After the Armistice, Kurdish nationalistic sentiments grew in Persian Kurdistan where before it had few adherents. This was due in part to the Ottoman Sultan's support. These pan-Islamic policies were designed to win over the Kurds in the region in the possibility of using them as a barrier against the Russians or Armenians.

However, Kurdish nationalism grew in other environments. In 1918, members of the Mukri tribe of the Mahabad region were in talks with British officials discussing a possible scheme for an independent Kurdish state under British protection. Like Sharif Pasha, these individuals stressed their desire for autonomy and a desire to reach a peace agreement with the Armenians.At the same time, British policy imposed clear limits on Kurdish political aspirations. The representatives of the Kurdish tribes of Persia, who had sought to join Shaykh Mahmud’s South Kurdish Confederation, were informed that such a plan was not feasible due to Britain’s international obligations. Instead, they were urged to remain loyal Persian subjects while maintaining friendly relations with the South Kurdish Confederation, a response they had reportedly accepted without resistance. Nevertheless, this scene was later described as a “regrettable incident”, reinforced a growing perception among the inhabitants of Southern Kurdistan that Britain was no longer capable of controlling events. As a result, unrest spread into Persian territory, where several tribes rose against the Persian government, proclaiming their support for Shaykh Mahmud and his vision of a free and united Kurdistan.

Later in 1921, the Persian Kurd, Simko Shikak pursued a different strategy. Simko dealt directly with Persian and Russian officials. He became impatient with Persia's unwillingness to act on granting Kurdish autonomy, and so rebelled in 1922. In the Persian operations against Simko's rebellion, Turkish armies provided valuable support. The rebellion was quickly put down. Following this rebellion, however, Major Noel tried, unsuccessfully, to bring together Simko and other Kurdish nationalist leaders, including Shaykh Mahmud. The object was to create a Kurdish alliance to frustrate Turkish designs. No agreement was reached between these leaders.

== The Treaty of Lausanne ==
After it became apparent how vehemently the government in Ankara opposed the Treaty of Sèvres and with the rising power of the Kemalists, Major Noel and the British began seriously considering supporting a Kurdish rebellion. The fear that the rebellion might not be controllable resulted in the plan's abandonment.

This plan was revived, however, in 1921 after Kemalist troops were found meddling with tribes south of the Armistice line. British policymakers again began contemplating assisting a wide-scale Kurdish rebellion against the Turks in order to counter their growing strength and influence in the region. There were many drawbacks to this plan. This would reflect negatively on King Faisal of Iraq, as weapons would come to northern Kurdistan via Iraq. If the revolt failed, it was thought that the British in Iraq would face a massive amount of Kurdish refugees. There was also the constant worry that Kurdish leaders were unreliable and the Kurdish forces were not unified. But the French had reached an agreement with the government in Ankara on the basis of the National Pact rather than the Treaty of Sèvres. This was done after the Greeks seemed likely to lose against the Turks. France ceded much of its previously occupied land in southern Anatolia, thus providing the Kemalists with the ideal assembly point for an assault on British occupied Iraq. This caused the British to re-evaluate the plausibility of their plans to foment rebellion among the Kurds against the Turks.

Yet it still appeared that the British favored Kurdish autonomy in Iraq when they issued a Joint Declaration with the Iraqi government in 1922 that was communicated to the League of Nations. It recognized the right of the Kurds to form a government within the borders of Iraq.

In the end, as Kemalist forces spread and grew in strength, "the British desire for peace with Turkey, on the best terms for itself, of course, subordinated Britain's Kurdish policy to this objective." (p. 81). It became desirable for the British to negotiate peace with Turkey on much different terms than those of the Treaty of Sèvres.

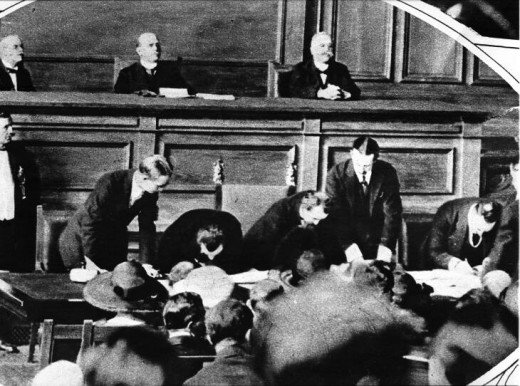
Signing of the Treaty of Lausanne (1923)

On 24 July 1923, the Treaty of Lausanne was signed between the British, their allies, and the Turks. The treaty failed to mention the Kurds, even though they made up around 1/3rd of the population of Turkey in the new borders and contained 48.5 percent of the total Kurdish population.

Borders between Turkey and Iraq were to be decided between Great Britain and Turkey within nine months of the implementation of the treaty. Kurdish leaders did petition the League of Nations and Britain for the recognition of Kurdish autonomy during negotiations on the Treaty of Lausanne in 1923. In the end, the League of Nations abandoned ethnic considerations in favor of economic and strategic ones. Kurdish territory in modern-day Iraq was granted to Iraq, under British control. The Kurdish regions were fully incorporated into the state in 1923 when Iraq held its first elections to the Constituent Assembly.

The Iraqi Prime Minister, before the signing of the Treaty of Lausanne, was authorized to meet with Kurdish tribal leaders in Sulaymaniyah in 1923. By this time, he found that they were very much in support of the plan to recognize their national aspirations but within the framework of one country. They even displayed support to King Faisal in a meeting with him in May 1923. These Kurdish leaders, as well as other Kurdish business men and dignitaries were opposed to Shaykh Mahmud's style of nationalism because of his history of political manipulation and lawlessness. According to Muhsin al-Musawi, many tribal Shaykhs and many in the Kurdish elite were strongly inclined by this time to a unified Iraq. Nevertheless, Kurds in Iraq established the short-lived Kingdom of Kurdistan in the city of Sulaymaniyah. The Kingdom lasted from September 1922 until July 1924.

== See also ==
- Kurdish nationalism
- Kurdistan
- Kurds in World War II
- History of the Kurds#20th century history
- A Modern History of the Kurds by David McDowall
