= Malatya Province =

Province of Turkey

Coordinates: 38°29′03″N 38°08′11″E

Malatya Province Malatya ili
- Province and metropolitan municipality
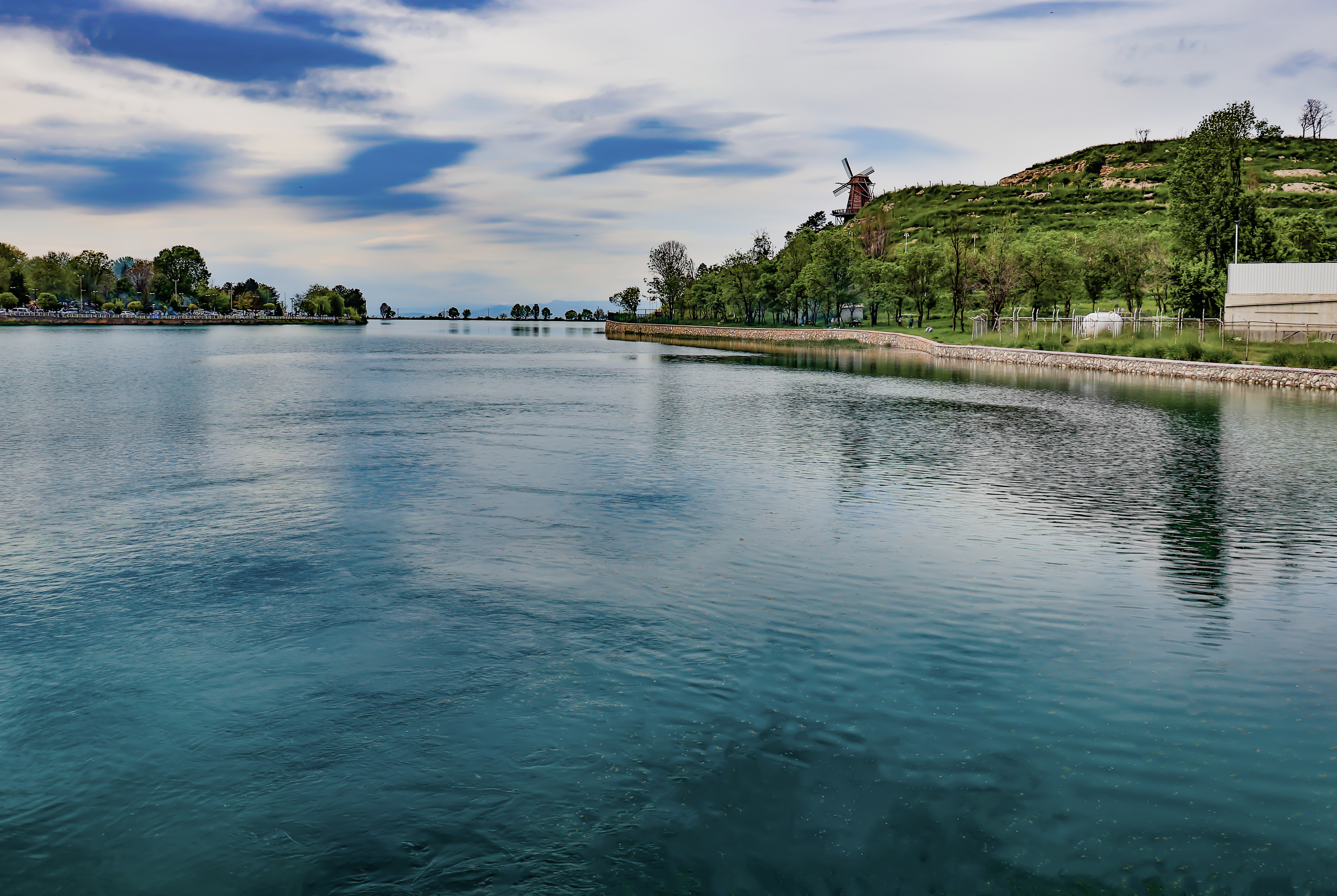
- Malatya Turgut Özal Nature Park

- Location of the province within Turkey
- Country: Turkey
- Seat: Malatya

Government
  - Mayor: Sami Er (AKP)
  - Vali: Engin Sarıibrahim
- Area: 12,259 km^{2} (4,733 sq mi)
- Population (2022): 812,580
  - Density: 66.284/km^{2} (171.68/sq mi)
- Time zone: UTC+3 (TRT)
- Area code: 0422
- Website: www.malatya.bel.tr www.malatya.gov.tr

Malatya Province (Turkish: Malatya ili) is a province and metropolitan municipality of Turkey. Its area is 12,259 km^{2}, and its population is 812,580 (2022). It is part of a larger mountainous area. The capital of the province is the city of Malatya, which has a population of 485,484 (2022).

According to the Encyclopaedia of Islam, the province is considered part of Turkish Kurdistan.

== Districts ==
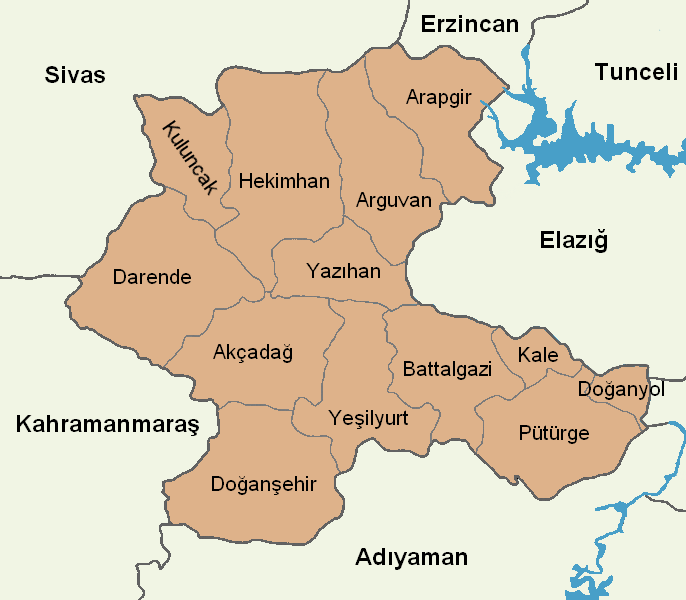
Districts of the Malatya Province

Malatya province is divided into 13 districts:

- Akçadağ
- Arapgir
- Arguvan
- Battalgazi
- Darende
- Doğanşehir
- Doğanyol
- Hekimhan
- Kale
- Kuluncak
- Pütürge
- Yazıhan
- Yeşilyurt

== Demographics ==
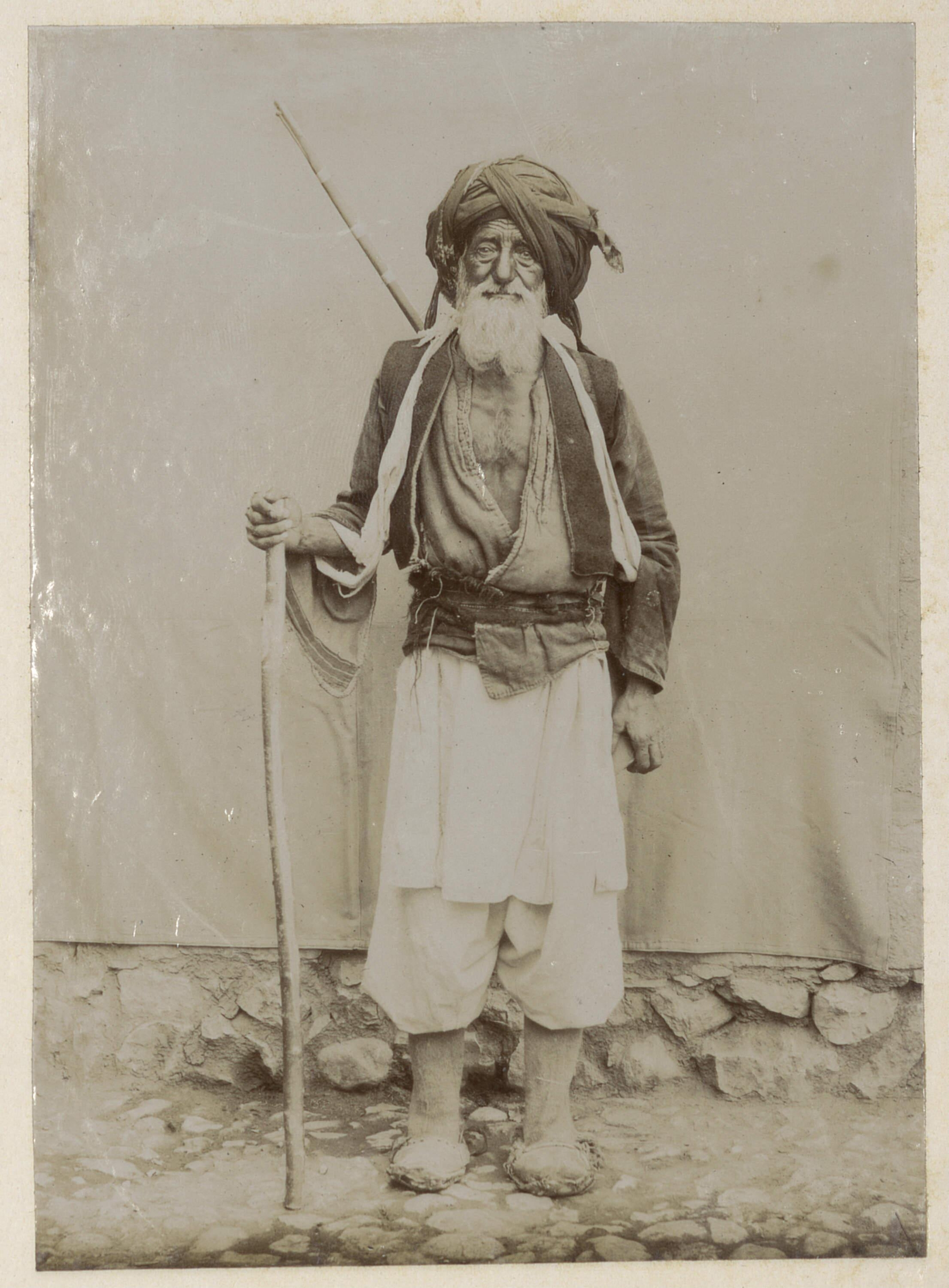
Kurdish man of Malatya (1904)

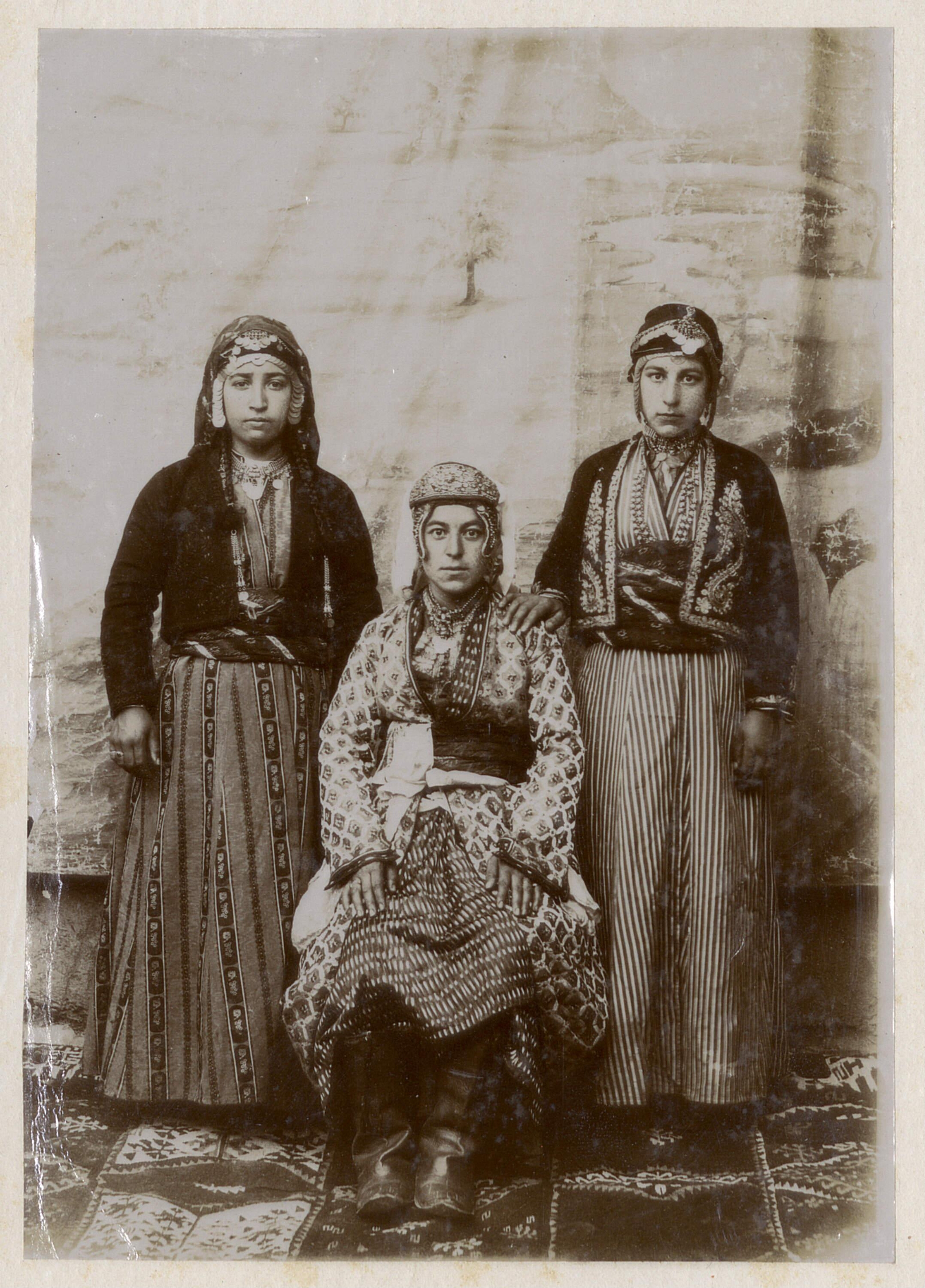
Armenian women of Malatya (1904)

According to German geographers Georg Hassel and Adam Christian Gaspari, Malatya was composed of 1200 to 1500 houses in early 19th century, inhabited by Ottomans, Turkmens, Armenians, and Greeks, while the mountainous areas in the sanjak of Malatya were mostly inhabited by Kurdish tribes such as Reşwan.

The province had a population of 306,882 in 1927 of which 98.9% was Muslim and 1% Christians. Linguistically, Turkish was the most spoken first language at 57.3%, followed by Kurdish at 40.2% and Armenian at 0.9%. The population increased to 410,152 in 1935 of which 99.3% was Muslim and 0.6% Christian. Turkish remained the most spoken first language at 60.2%, followed by Kurdish 39.3% and Armenian at 0.4%. The province had a population of 483,568 in 1950 of which Turkish was spoken by 64.8% of the population, followed by Kurdish at 34.9%. Armenian remained the third most spoken language but decreased to 0.2%. The modern province of Malatya does not fully coincide with the province of Malatya until 1954, before when the province also included the modern Turkish province of Adıyaman, which was more than double Kurdish-speaking than Malatya according to the 1965 census.

It was estimated in 2012 that about 20% to 30% of the province was Alevi of which the vast majority was Kurdish. This group is mostly politically aligned with nationalist Kurdish parties especially after the Sivas Massacre and activity of the Kurdistan Workers' Party since the early 1990s.

== History ==
German academic Barbara Henning describes the province as the regional center of Kurdish nationalism in the early 20th century. During this period, the local governor of the province and mayor of Malatya city were both sympathetic to the Kurdish cause and Celadet Bedir Khan, Kamuran Alî Bedirxan and other members of the Society for the Rise of Kurdistan visited the region various times and established cordial relations with the local tribes including with the Reşwan tribe.

== Geography ==
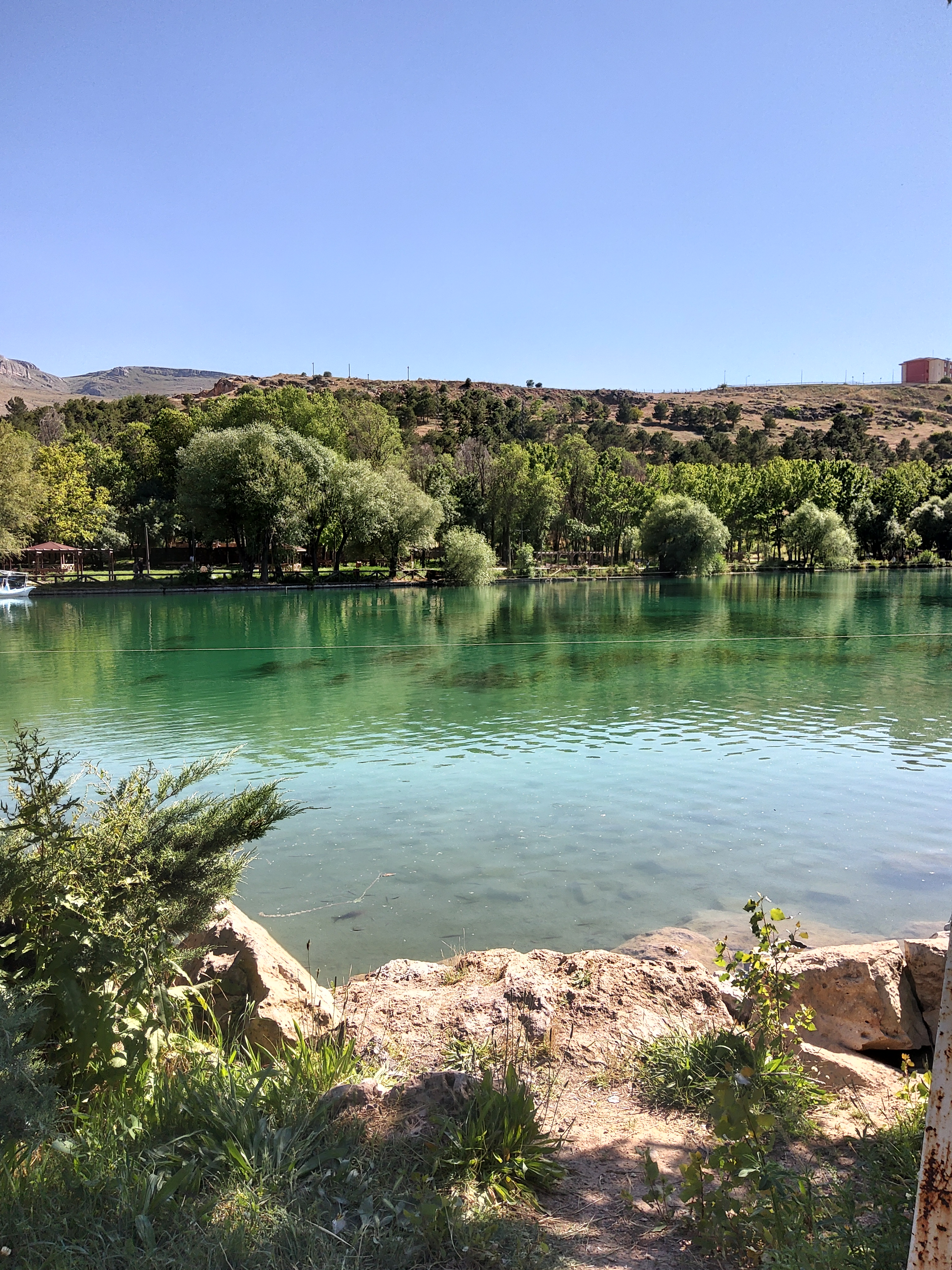
Malatya Turgut Ozal Nature Park. View of stream and trees

== Local sites ==
- İnönü University (since 1975)
- Turgut Özal Medical Center (in İnönü University)
- Malatya Erhaç Airport (serving both public and military)

=== Bibliography ===
- Dündar, Fuat (2000), Türkiye nüfus sayımlarında azınlıklar (in Turkish), ISBN 9789758086771
