= Kurdistan (newspaper) =

Kurdish newspaper

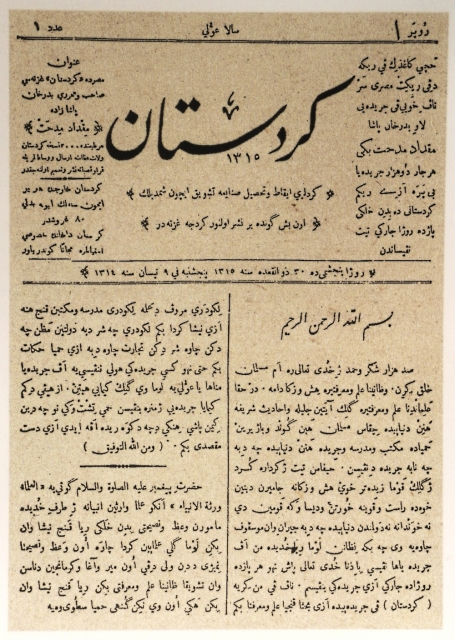
Kurdistan

Kurdistan was the first Kurdish newspaper. It was first published on April 22, 1898 in Cairo, Egypt by Mikdad Midhat Bedir Khan, a member of the Kürdistan Teali Cemiyeti. In four years, 31 issues were printed in cities as Cairo, Geneva, London and Folkestone. It was an opposition newspaper published in exile (outside the Ottoman Empire) and supported by the Committee of Union and Progress and was published in Constantinople after the Young Turk revolution in 1908. It was often printed at CUP linked print shops which caused the newspaper to move to where ever the CUP had to establish itself anew due to the CUP's persecution by Ottoman ambassadors loyal to Sultan Abdülhamid.

In 1914, during World War I, the newspaper returned to Cairo. Its first issues were published solely in Kurmanji, but from the 4th issue some texts in Turkish were also published. The newspaper is described as a nationalist newspaper as it made notions of territorial entity Kurdistan. In its folio, it was mentioned to be distributed for free within the borders of Kurdistan, while in the exterior its cost was 80 pennies. Beginning with the second issue onwards, it published a series of the Kurdish national epic Mem u Zin. From its 6th issue the newspaper was published in Geneva, and edited by Abdurrahman Bedir Khan, Mikdads brother who had close ties to Abdullah Cevdet and İshak Sükuti, both editors of the Osmanli and founders of co-founders of Committee of Union and Progress. The newspaper published several articles that were critical to the government of Sultan Abdul Hamid II. It got banned right after the first issue was released in the Ottoman Empire and had to be smuggled in. From its 16th issue, the newspaper title Kurdistan was also written in smaller Latin script below the Arabic one. Kurds who returned from the Islamic pilgrimage Hajj to Mecca had to undergo a thorough search if the smuggled in the newspaper. A reader complained about how they were persecuted if they read the newspaper in public in the Ottoman Empire.

According to the letters to the editor it had readers in cities as Adana, Damascus, Mardin and Diyarbakır. It published articles concerning Kurdish History and literature and the opposition to Abdul Hamid II. One of its first issues included a call in Turkish language to Abdul Hamid for that its distribution shall be allowed in the Kurdish provinces arguing that the illiteracy of the Kurds was a reason for the backwardness of the Kurds but as well for the foreign powers to intervene in the region. Kurdish historical figures such as Sultan Saladin or members of the Marwanid dynasty or the house of Bedir Khan and their achievements were a recurrent subject in its articles. In 1918, the newspaper was published by the son of Emin Ali Bedirkhan, Süreyya Bedir Khan. In 1991, the scholar Emin Bozarslan re-published and translated a collection of its suites into Modern Turkish.

== Sources ==
- Zeynel Abidin Kızılyaprak, Hasan Kaya, Şerif Beyaz, Zana Farqini, İstanbul Kürt Enstitüsü, 1900'den 2000'e Kürtler - Kronolojik Albüm, Özgür Bakış Milenyum Armağanı, İstanbul, Ocak 2000, p. 12.
- Malmîsanij, Cızira Botanlı Bedirhaniler ve Bedirhani Ailesi Derneği'nin Tutunakları, Avesta, İstanbul, 2000, ISBN 975-7112-71-2, pp. 187–197.
