= Süreyya Bedir Khan =

Kurdish politician

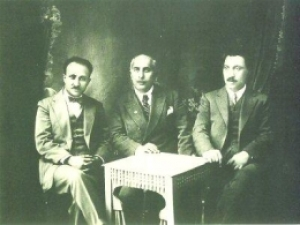
From left to right: Kamuran, Süreyya and Celadet Bedir Khan

Süreyya Bedir Khan (1883 in Constantinople – 1938 in Paris) was a Kurdish prince, a descendant of Bedir Khan Beg and a member of the Bedir Khan family. He was an influent supporter of Kurdish independence, a journalist and author of several books. His works are also known under his pen-name Bletch Chirguh.

== Early life and education ==
He was born into the noble Kurdish family of the Bedir Khans, as the son of Emin Ali Bedir Khan and his first wife. His mother died as he was still a child, in 1887. He attended the Galatasaray High school in Constantinople until 1906, as he had to abandon his studies when he and other male members of the Bedirkhan family were sent into exile to Isparta, after his uncle Ali Şamil Bedir Khan was accused of being involved in the murder of the mayor of Constantinople, Rıdvan Pasha. Like other members of the Bedir Khan family, he claimed an ancestry to Khalid Ibn al-Walid, the Sword of Islam and general and companion of the Islamic prophet Muhammad.

== Political and journalistic career ==
He came back to Constantinople in 1908, where he began his journalistic career. From 1909 and 1912 he was a member of the Ottoman bureaucracy and governed municipalities in the Aydin and Beirut Vilayet. According to a British intelligence report, he was requested to enter the Ottoman Government by Enver Pasha in 1912, a demand he did not follow and concerned over reprisals, he left for Egypt. In Egypt he was welcomed by a community of exiled former Ottoman intellectuals and was given the task to take care of the estate of Nimetullah Hanim, a princess of the Khedivial family and daughter-in-law of Ahmed Muhtar Pasha. In 1918 he established the Committee for the Independence of Kurdistan and onwards he re-initiated the publication of the Kürdistan newspaper which originally was founded by his uncle Mikhdad Midhat Bedir Khan. He also supported the Kurdish ambitions at the Paris Peace Conference, using his contacts to the diplomatic circles in Cairo, but did not personally attend the conference. From 1920 on, he mainly stayed in Egypt, after he was urged by the British to return from a short Syrian stay and established himself in the az-Zahir quarter in Cairo. Other family members such as Zarife Bedir Khan, who was the wife of Arif Mardinzade, also lived in Cairo at the time, and were joined by several others in March 1920 coming from Istanbul. They were accompanied by a spy of the Kemalists, who suspected Süreyya Bedir Khan of having much influence with the British diplomatic community. The spy later threatened the Bedirkhan family after it was found out what she was doing. After the Xoybûn was founded in Beirut in 1927, he became its local representative in Cairo, and together with his brothers Kamuran and Celadet Bedir Khan was a leader of the organization. In 1928, shortly before travelling to the United States, Süreyya Bedir Khan was reportedly invited to meet Benito Mussolini and stayed as his guest in Rome for fifteen days. He subsequently believed that Mussolini was willing to offer support to the Kurds. When he arrived in the U.S, he attempted to raise support among the Kurdish community for the Ararat rebellion. He stayed there for eight months and resided in Detroit. He returned to Europe in April 1929 accompanied by Grigor Vartanian a member of the Armenian Relief Committee who was asked by the soviets to figure as the liaison between the Xoybun and the soviets. He attempted to support the Ararat rebellion throughout 1930. After the Turkish Government decided to strip him of his Ottoman passport in 1928, he successfully applied for the Syrian citizenship, alleging that we was born in Maqtala, a claim that was refuted by the French in 1933. Due to Turkish pressure during the Ararat Revolt, the authorities of the French Mandate encouraged Süreyya to leave Syria. In 1931, he settled in Paris, where he established relations with the Greek and Armenian intellectual community and lived in an apartment in the Rue de Sèvres. He lived in Paris until his death in 1938.

== Works ==
- 1926, Les massacres Kurdes en Turquie
- 1928, The case of Kurdistan against Turkey
