= Roger Lescot =

French orientalist and diplomat

Roger Lescot (1914–1975) was a French orientalist and diplomat known for his research of the Kurdish language.

== Biography ==
Roger Lescot obtained a degree in Arabic and Oriental literature in 1935. Later he also gained a degree in Turkish and Persian. In 1935 he began to learn Kurdish, and in 1936 during the French Mandate of Syria, he was in contact with the Yazidi in the Kurd Dagh and also with the Shia in the south of Lebanon. Roger Lescot and Pierre Rondot supervised the Kurdish activities within the French Mandate, specializing in Kurdish press and literature. Both were working together with Kurdish activists and were supportive of the Kurdish cultural aims. Lescot then wrote for several Kurdish outlets such as the Hawar, Roja Nû or Ronahî. Lescot was a close collaborator to members of the Berdirkhan family.

Upon his initiative the chair for Kurdish lectures was created at the National Institute for Oriental Languages and Civilizations (INALCO) in 1945, a position he held until 1947, and trespassed to Kamuran Bedirkhan, as he took up diplomatic work as a French diplomat in Cairo and work for the French intelligence. After four years of studies about the Kurdish national epic Mem û Zîn he published a version of it in Kurdish and a translation in French in 1942. In 1953 he published a French translation from the Persian of Sadegh Hedayat's novel The Blind Owl as La chouette aveugle. He published his and Celadet Bedirkhan's Grammaire kurde in 1970.

== Works ==
- Proverbes et énigmes kurdes, Paris: Librairie Orientaliste Paul Geuthner, 1937
- Quelques pages inédites de Djâmî, ca. 1937
- Enquête sur les yezidis de Syrie et du Djebel Sindjar, Beirut: 1938
- Notes sur la presse Iranienne, Paris: Librairie Orientaliste Paul Geuthner, 1938
- La réforme du vocabulaire en Iran, Paris: Librairie Orientaliste Paul Geuthner, 1939
- Textes kurdes, Paris: Librairie Orientaliste Paul Geuthner, 1940–42
- Mem û Zîn, Beirut: 1942, Beirut
- La chouette aveugle, Paris: Jose Corti, 1953
- Anthologie de la poésie persane : XIe-XXe siècle. Textes choisis par Z. Safâ, traduits par G. [Gilbert] Lazard, R. [Roger] Lescot et H. [Henri] Massé, Paris: Gallimard, 1964
- Grammaire kurde, Paris: Librairie d'Amérique et d'Orient, 1970
