= Memi Alan =

- Directed by: Nasir Hassan
- Country of origin: Kurdistan

Original release
- Network: Kurdistan TV
- Release: 2002

Memi Alan (Kurdish: Mem û Zîn/Memî Alan û Zînî Buhtan (Mem and Zin) is a Kurdish drama that was directed by Nasir Hassan and shown by the Kurdish satellite TV station Kurdistan TV during Ramadan 2002. Mem û Zîn is a famous novel which was written by Ahmad Khani in 1694. It is the most important work of Kurdish writer and poet Ahmad Khani (1651-1707). Mam and Zin is based on a true story.

== Story ==
Mem of the Alan clan and Zin of the Buhtan clan are two lovers. Their union is blocked by a man named Bakr of the Bakran clan. Mem, a young Kurdish boy, falls in love with Zin, the daughter of the governor of Buhtan, while the people are celebrating Newroz, the ancient national new year ceremony of Kurds. Mem eventually dies in the end as the result of a complicated conspiracy by Bakr. When Zin receives the news, she mourns Mem's death on his grave. The immense grief leads to her death and she is buried next to Mem. The news of the death of Mem and Zin spreads quickly among the people of Jazira Buhtan. Then Bakr's role in the tragedy is revealed, and he takes sanctuary between the two graves. He is eventually captured and slain by the people of Jazira. A thorn bush soon grows out of Bakr’s blood, sending its roots of malice deep into the earth between the lovers’ graves, separating the two even after their death.

== Media ==
Nasir Hassan, the director of the successful drama said, "Memi Alan" is the most substantial and the most sophisticated artistic work ever done in Kurdistan. With a crew of more than 1000 people and 250 actors.

== Kurdish People ==
For Kurds, Mem and Zin are symbols of the Kurdish people and the Kurdish country, which are separated and cannot come together. The Mem u Zin museum in Cizre province has become a tourist attraction.

The movie Mem u Zin was produced in 1991 in Turkey. It was not allowed to play the story in the Kurdish language. Mem û Zîn also emphasizes the national aspirations of the Kurdish people.
