= Mem and Zin =

1692 Kurdish love story by Ahmad Khani

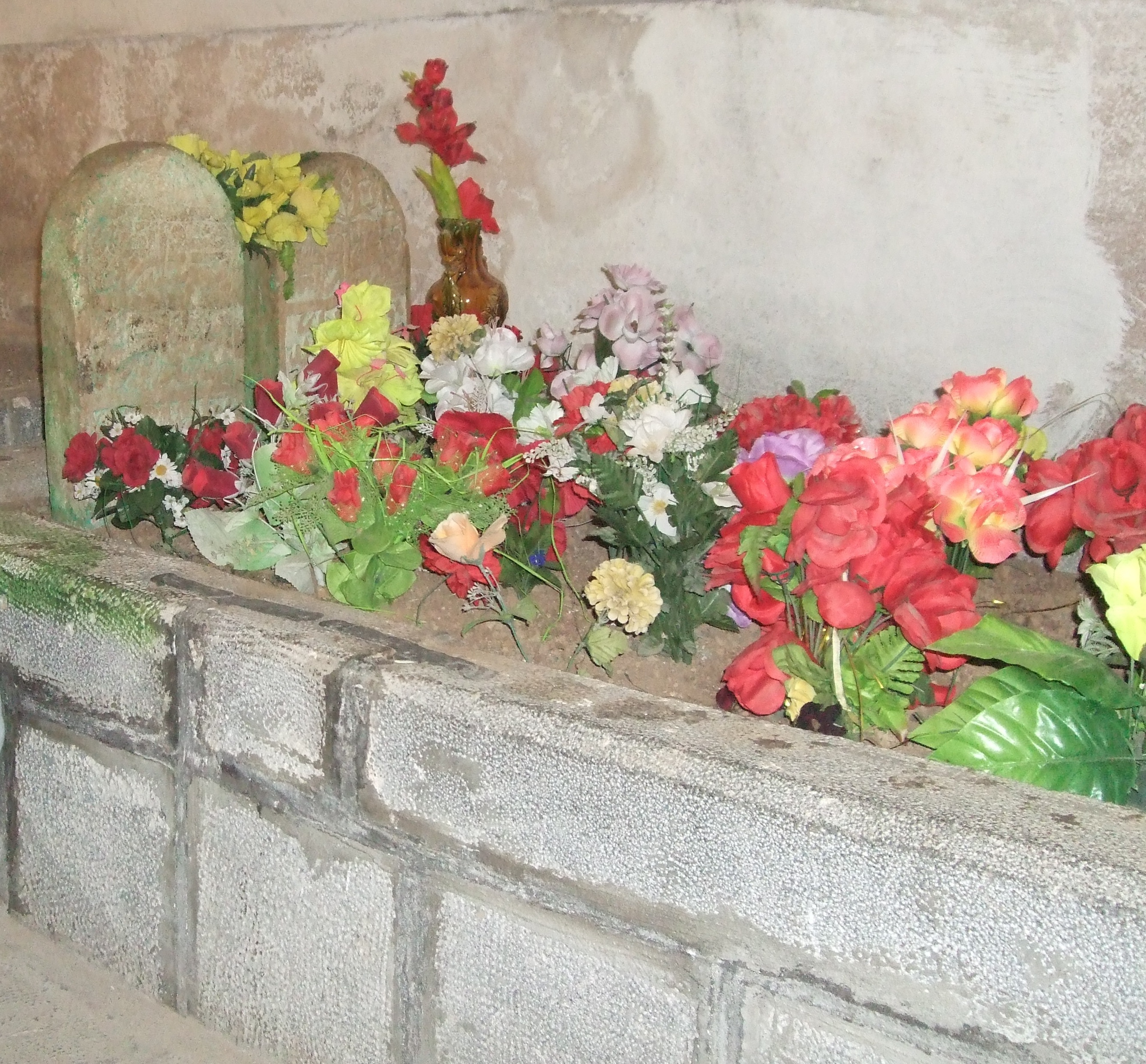
- Grave of Mem û Zîn in Cizre, 2008.
- Author: Ahmad Khani
- Language: Kurdish language
- Genre: Historical, Romance, Tragedy
- Publication date: 1692
- Media type: Print (Hardback & Paperback) & Audiobook

Mem and Zin (Kurdish: Mem û Zîn) is a Kurdish classic love story written in 1692 and is considered to be the épopée of Kurdish literature. It is the most important work of Kurdish writer and poet Ahmad Khani (1651–1707). Mam and Zin is based on a true story narrated from generation to generation through oral tradition. The story has multiple facets, among which are the presence of Sufi discourse and Kurdish nationalism. The Mem-u Zin Mausoleum in Cizre province has become a tourist attraction.

== Synopsis ==
It tells the tragic story of two young people in love. Mem, a young Kurdish boy of the "Alan" clan and heir to the City of the West, who falls in love with Zin, of the "Botan" clan and the daughter of the governor of Botan. Their union is blocked by Bakr of the Bakran clan, who is Mem's antagonist throughout the story and is jealous of the two star-crossed lovers. Mem eventually dies during a complicated conspiracy by Bakr. When Zin receives the news, she collapses and dies while mourning the death of Mem at his grave. The immense grief leads to her death and she is buried next to Mem in Cizre. The news of the death of Mem and Zin spreads quickly among the people of Jazira Botan. When Bakr's (Beko) role in the tragedy is revealed, Tacdîn, the best friend of Mem, kills him. Bakr (Beko) will be buried next to Mem and Zin's graves. Because before dying, Mem gives his testimony and says that "It was because of Beko that we could not come together, so I want him to witness our love; if he dies, bury him next to me and Zîn". However, a thorn bush, nourished by the blood of Bakr, grows out of his grave: the roots of malice penetrate deep into the earth among the lovers’ graves, thus separating the two even in death.

== Texts ==
Of all variations, the work of Ahmad Khani is the best known. Kurdish prince Celadet Ali Bedirxan and Roger Lescot, a French Orientalist, added in the 1930s, the Memê Alan narrative with the help of several Kurdish Dengbêj singers from Adiyaman and Afrin Syria. The forecast is partly historical roots, probably originating in the 14th century and has been handed down by the Dengbêj. She describes, in precise and poetic language, the story of the ill-fated love of Mem and Zin. Against the background of chivalric traditions and social conventions. This version is the version of the folk tale the next. The full version of the legend Memê Alan is now an integral part of the Kurdish literature.

== Film adaptations ==
In 1992, on the basis of the book Mem u Zin, Ümit Elçi directed a film with the same name. Since the Kurdish language in Turkey was prohibited from 1980 until the late 1990s or the early 2000s, the Kurdish epic had to be released in Turkish.

In 2002, the Kurdistan satellite channel Kurdistan TV produced the dramatised mini-series Memi Alan directed by Nasir Hassan.

== Literature ==
- KOMKAR: Mam (Mamo) and Zin, Kurdish folk epic. In the version by Roger Lescot and L.-Lot Wentzel, Cologne 1995th
- The award-winning novel by Haritha Savithri set in Turkey is named Zîn.

== Current edition ==
- Paris : Weşanên Enstîtuya Kurdî ya Parîsê, 1989 (LCCN 98956769)
