= Kurdish Society for Cooperation and Progress =

Kurdish organization in the Ottoman Empire

The Kurdish Society for Cooperation and Progress "Kürt Teavün ve Terakki Cemiyeti" (KTTC) was founded September 1908 in Constantinople. Also known as the Kurdish Society for Progress and Mutual Aid, Kurdish Society for Mutual Aid and Progress, Kurdish Society for Support and Progress, Kurdish Society for Assistance and Progress, Kurdish Society for Solidarity and Progress, Kurdish Progressive League, Kurdish League, Kurdish Club and Kurdish Society. The society published a Gazette, which was the first legal Kurdish publication, it debated issues surrounding history, language, national unity and many other topics effecting Kurds. It was the first ever political Kurdish organization and was influenced by European ideas. It called for a political, economic and social awakening of Kurdistan. The announcement of its establishment was made in September 1908 and backed by 500 leading Kurdish intellectuals and statesmen. The membership of the society grew very fast in cities and towns with large Kurdish populations. The society had a cultural branch, which established a Kurdish language school for children in Çemberlitas, Constantinople, led by Abdurrahman Bedir Khan. It was closed down in 1909 and reestablished and renamed in 1917 as the Society for the Elevation of Kurdistan.

The founding members were;

Abdulkadir Ubeydullah

Seyyid Abdulkadir

Şerif Pasha

Şerif Pasha

Emin Ali Bedir Khan.

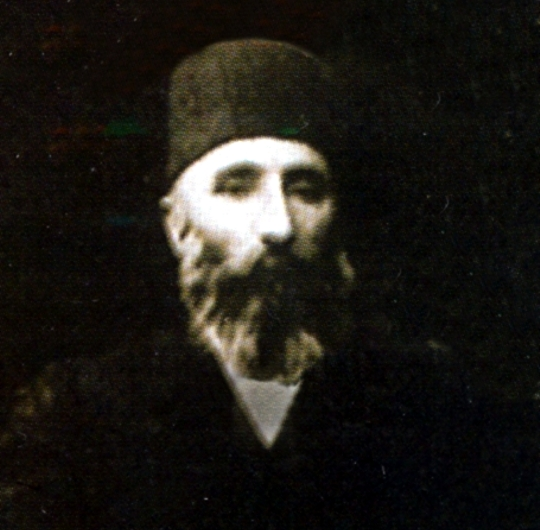
Emin Ali Bedir Khan
