= Kamuran Alî Bedirxan =

Kurdish politician and writer

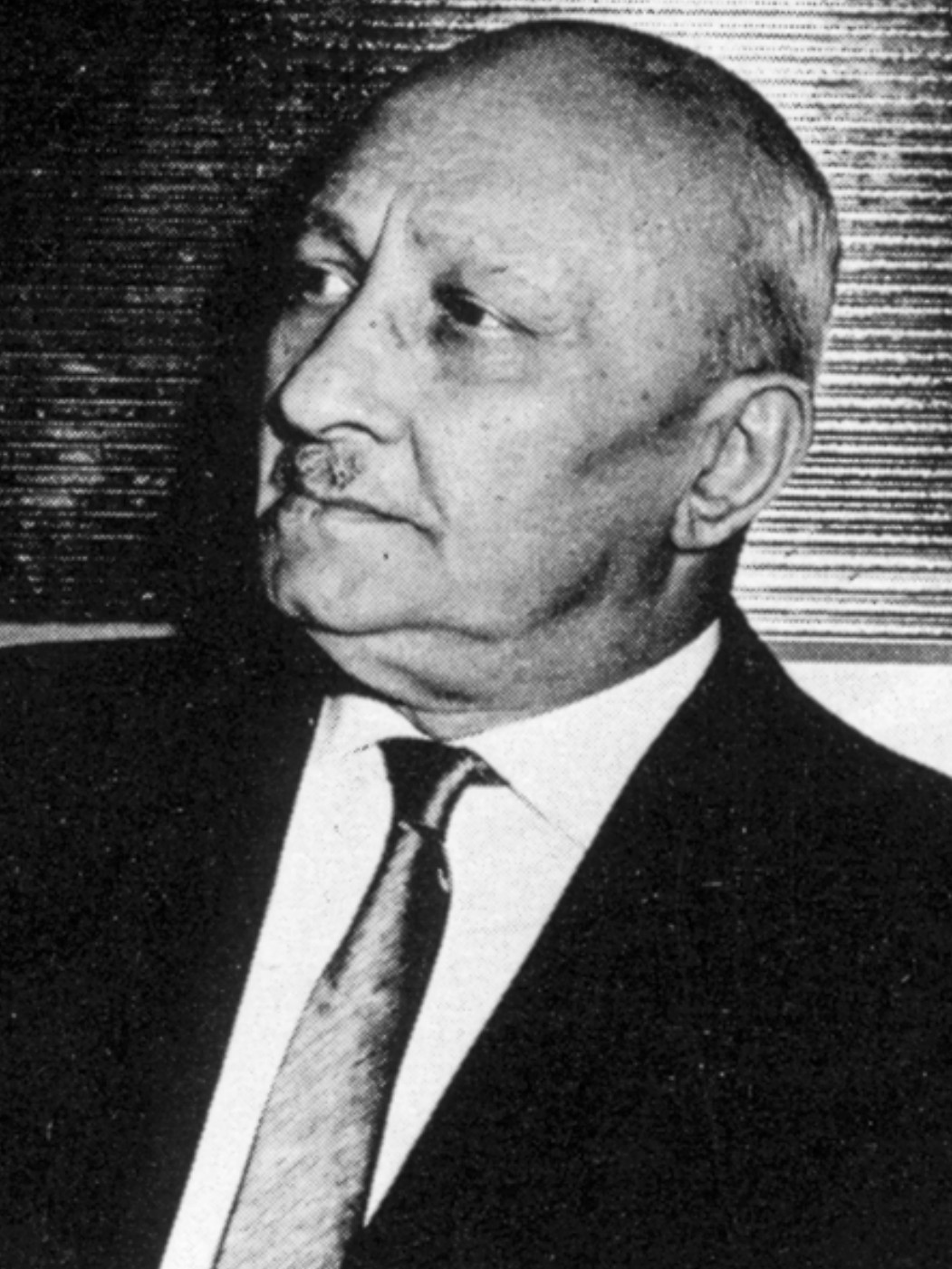
- Born: August 21, 1895; Istanbul
- Died: December 6, 1978 (aged 83); Paris
- Occupations: Lecturer, Publisher
- Spouse: Nathalie d'Ossovetzky
- Relatives: Bedirxan family
- Writing career
- Language: Kurdish
- Subject: Kurds

Kamuran Alî Bedirxan (Kurdish: Kamiran Alî Bedirxan ,کامەران ئالی بەدرخان; 21 August 1895 – 6 December 1978) was a Kurdish politician, lawyer, writer and nobleman.

== Family ==
Bedirxan came from the family of the Bedirxans, who for centuries, as autonomous vassals of the Ottomans, ruled the Principality of Bohtan with the capital Cizre. His grandfather Bedirxan Beg had rebelled against the Ottomans at the end of the 19th century and was deported to Istanbul after his defeat and family. Kamuran's father Emin Ali Bedirxan was politically active in the Kurdish movement and was the founder of the Kurdistan Teali Cemiyeti, in which Kamuran was also a member. His brother Celadet Ali Bedirxan was also politically active and the creator of the Latin Kurmanji alphabet.

Bedirxan had been married to the Polish princess Nathalie d'Ossovetzky (who died in 1975) since 1954. d'Ossovetzky, who has been his student and later also secretary, was supportive of his writing. The couple had no children.

== Education ==
Bedirxan attended the French Galatasaray High School in Istanbul. Between 1905 and 1908 his family had to leave the city because of a murder at the Istanbul prefects and lived in Isparta and Beirut. He later studied law at Istanbul University and worked as a lawyer.

== Political career ==
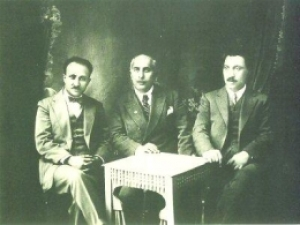
Bedirxan brothers. Left to right: Kamiran (1895-1978), Sureyya (1883-1938), Celadet (1895-1951).

In 1918, Bedirxan became a member of the Society for the Elevation of Kurdistan (Kurdistan Teali Cemiyeti), like others from his family. In 1919, Kamuran and his brother Celadet Bedirxan accompanied British officer Edward Noel in his travels through Iraq. Noel was assessing the possibility of the creation of an official nation of Kurdistan.

Bedirxan was an opponent of Atatürk's independence movement and was ordered by the British government in Istanbul to go to a planned congress in 1919 in Sivas and arrest Mustafa Kemal Atatürk. He set off with several men, including his brother, the governor of Harput and the British officer Edward Noel, but the project failed.

Kamuran was an opponent of Kemalism and when the Republic of Turkey was proclaimed in 1923, he had already left the country to Germany. He lived with his relatives in Munich where he studied law at the Ludwig-Maximilians-Universität München and after followed up on his studies at Leipzig University from which he also graduated. In 1927, he settled to Syria and worked as a lawyer in Beirut. He also joined the organization Xoybûn and helped his brother with the publication of the Kurdish newspaper Hawar. In the thirties he stayed in Berlin and met the Iranian Karl Hadank. He conducted a radio program in Kurdish language at the Radio Levant in Beirut from 1942 onwards until 1946. In 1944, Kamuran contributed to the establishment of the network Trava, which focus was on the development of the businesses. Between 1943 and 1946, Kamuran also published the Kurdish and French-language magazine Roja Nû (en: New Day) in Beirut. The following years he lived in Germany and France. After Syria became independent in 1946, he lost his work at the Radio Levant and he couldn't find a way to have influence in the local politics. Therefore, he moved to Paris where he became a lecturer at the Institut national des langues et civilizations orientales (INALCO) in 1948.

From 1960, Bedirxan became the European spokesman for the Iraqi Kurds led by Mustafa Barzani. He established important contacts between the Kurds and Israel. Israel saw the Kurds as a suitable means of weakening Iraq militarily and tying up the Iraqi army in northern Iraq. In 1962, he met Ihsan Nuri in West Berlin. In 1970 he retired.

Bedirxan died in 1978. He was posthumously appointed the co-founder of the Kurdish Institute of Paris. His works are kept in the Institute.

== Selected works ==
- Dilê qurên min. Ji giyanê bavê min - Kurdish poetry, 1923 Damascus
- Snow of Light - poem, 1935 Berlin
- Xwendina Kurdî, 1935, Damaskus
- Der Adler von Kurdistan, 1937, Berlin
- Memorandum on the situation of the Kurdes, 1948 Paris
- Le Kurde sans Peine's textbook, 1953 Paris
- Langue kurde, 2 volumes, 1953 Paris

== Sources ==
- Hakan Özoğlu: Kurdish Notables and the Ottoman State: Evolving Identities, Competing Loyalties, and Shifting Boundaries . Suny Press, 2004. ISBN 0-7914-5993-4 .
- Text by Birgit Ammann about Kamuran Bedirkhan
