= Society for the Rise of Kurdistan =

Kurdish organisation

Society for the Rise of Kurdistan (Kurdish: Komela Tealîya Kurdistanê) also known as the Society for the Advancement of Kurdistan (SAK), was secretly established in Constantinople on 6 November 1917 and officially announced organization formed on the 17 December 1918. It was headquartered in Istanbul, with the aim of creating an independent Kurdish state in eastern Turkey. The Society based its statements for an independent or autonomous Kurdistan on the Treaty of Sèvres and the Fourteen Points stipulated by Woodrow Wilson. The society formed many local dependencies in the eastern provinces of Turkey.

== Leadership ==
The leadership of the society was almost identical to that of its predecessor a decade earlier, including both Abdulkadir Ubeydullah and Emin Ali, together with Şerif Pasha, who was in exile, whose representative was his brother Fuad Pasha.

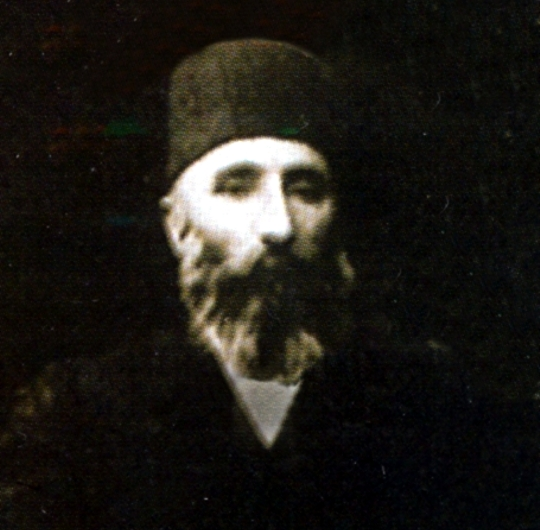
Society Vice President Emin Ali

Society Vice President Kurd Fuad Pasha

The leadership structure of the society;

- President: Abdulkadir Ubeydullah
- Vice President: Emin Ali
- Vice President: Fuad Pasha
- Secretary General: Hamdi Pasha
- Treasurer: Abdullah Effendi

== History ==
In January 1919 the society in a letter outlined its objectives to the British government through their High Commissioner in Constantinople Sir Somerset Gough-Calthorpe the letter consisted of four main points;

1. A specified and geographically defined territorial area to be assigned to the Kurds.
2. The Kurds would be grateful to enjoy the same privileges and to receive the same treatment at the hands of the Allied Powers of the Entente, as those granted to the Arabs, Armenians, Chaldeans, Assyrians and other small nationalities without distinction of race and religion.
3. The Kurds should be granted self government.
4. The Kurds particularly beg the British government to kindly undertake the protection of their rights and interests, and to help them in their path to civilisation and progress.

In June 1919, during its annual conference, the society voted to place the Wilsonian Fourteen Points at the centre of its political program, and warned that if Kurds were to fail in securing their national rights, they would remain oppressed and deprived of rights, and possibly remain imprisoned for centuries. The conference also declared the Kurds had the right to choose their own form of administration in their homeland and that it was appropriate for them to work towards attaining their national rights as did other nations and neighbouring communities.

The society in a meeting at their Constantinople headquarters unanimously passed a proposal from their members that Serif Pasa be appointed as the sole representative of the Kurdish nation to the Paris Peace Conference in 1919.

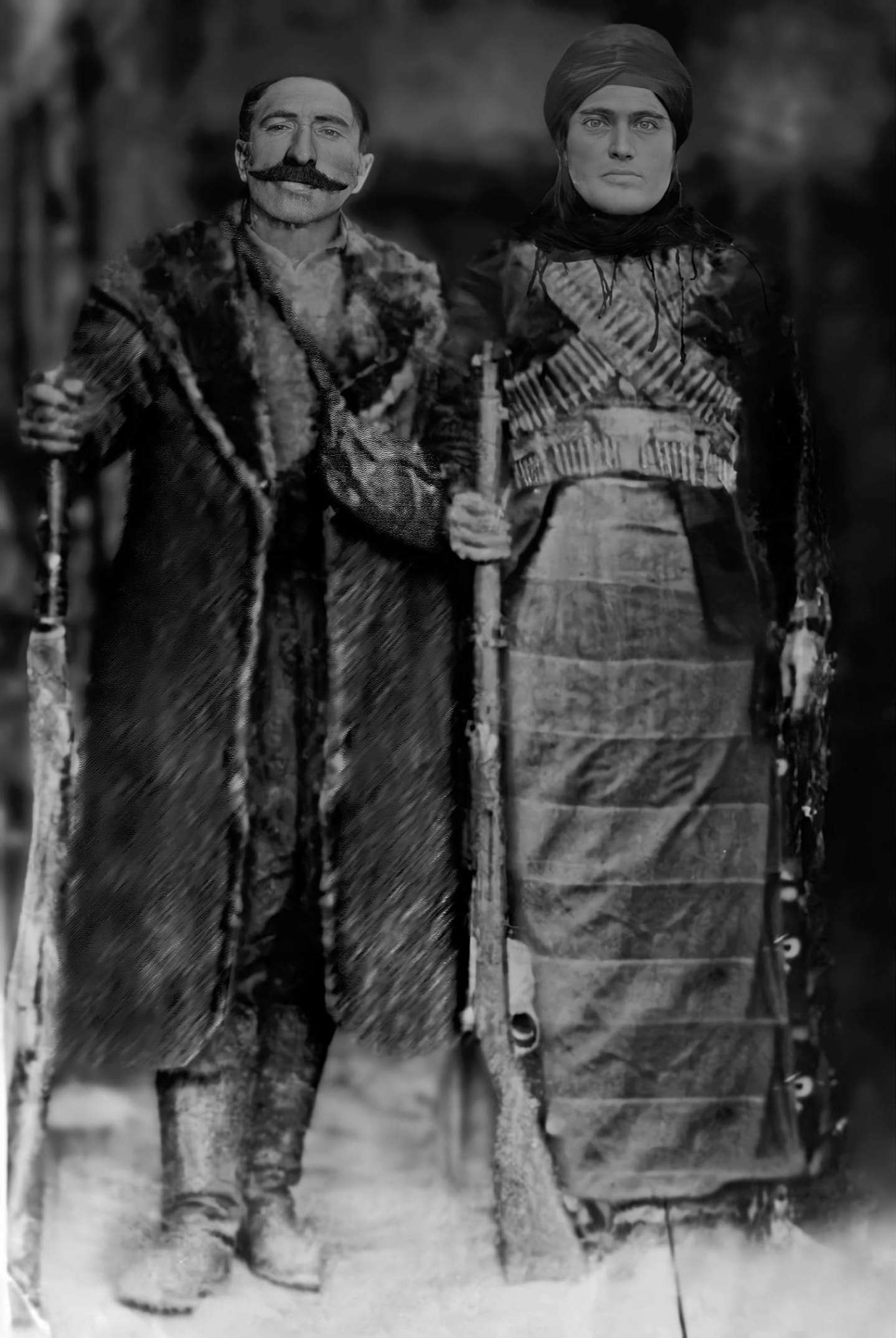
Alîşêr Efendî and his wife Zarife Xatun, in hiding in Tunceli. Probably photographed in the 1930s.

A SAK delegation represented the Kurds at the Paris Peace Conference, where it demanded political rights of the Kurds. Three months after the Treaty of Sèvres was signed, the Society supported the leaders of the Koçkiri tribe (Alevi–Kurd) who revolted in the Dersim area in eastern Asia Minor. It is documented that the rebellion was supported by the English in order to fight against Turkish nationalism. During the Turkish War of Independence former members of the organization attempted an uprising which became known as the Koçgiri rebellion and were encouraged by British major Edward William Charles Noel, in 1921, but was defeated by the Turkish army within three months on 17 June 1921.

It further aimed to promote the Kurdish language and culture. In the societies statutes, it was mentioned that their aim was to support the well-being of the Kurds. The society issued a weekly magazine named Jîn (Life) in 1918/1919. Jîn was published in Ottoman Turkish and Kurdish (Kurmanci and Sorani dialects). Notable founding and early members of the SAK were Abdulkadir Ubeydullah and Sayyid Abdullah (descendents of Sheikh Ubeydullah), Emin Ali Bedir Khan, Kamuran Bedir Khan and Mehmet Ali Bedir Khan (descendants of Bedir Khan Beg) and the Dr. Mehmet Şükrü Sekban amongst others. Abdulkadir was a member of the Ottoman parliament since 1910 and kept on to his position in Ottoman politics also after the establishment of the SAK of which he was it first president. In 1919, a women's branch of the SAK was established. However, disputes between Sayyid Abdulkadir, who was an advocate for autonomy within a future Turkish state, and Bedir Khan, who was in favor of Kurdish independence surged and eventually, the organization was broken up and in 1920, Bedir Khan established the Society for Kurdish Social Organization.

Following the uprising, the SAK was banned by the Turkish national assembly. The former leaders of the SAK, notably its president Sayyid Abdulkadir, his son Sayyid Mehmed, Dr. Fuad Berxo and the journalist Hizanizâde Kemal Fevzi were executed on the 27 May 1925 following their prosecution by the Independence Tribunal in Diyarbakır for allegedly supporting the Sheikh Said Rebellion. One of its leaders, Mikdad Midhat Bedir Khan, was the publisher of the first Kurdish newspaper Kurdistan in Cairo.

== Membership ==
Other notable members of the society numbered 176 in total. They included Mevlanzade Rifat Bey, Mustafa Yamulki.

Membership to the society was not limited to Kurds. John Duncan (British Army officer) noted that the statutes of the society included "To be admitted, prospective members were to provide a recommendation from one of the established members."
