= Hamdi Pasha =

Kurdish politician

Ahmed Hamdi Pasha was a Kurdish Ottoman minister of the Marine, Secretary General of the Society for the Elevation of Kurdistan from 1918-1920 and a General officer of the Ottoman Army.

A graduate of the Ottoman Military College, he rose to the rank of divisional general and chief of general staff. He was forced into early retirement by the Committee of Union and Progress, but continued to oppose them politically.

British government documents describe Hamdi as one of the leading lights of the Kurdish nationalist movement. Hamdi was in continuous contact with Sir Horace Rumbold, 9th Baronet regarding the memorandums of the Society for the Elevation of Kurdistan including the prospect of an independent Kurdistan as a barrier to Bolshevik progression into Mesopotamia.

During the Turkish War of Independence, Hamdi went into exile to Greece and never returned, even after being offered amnesty and permission to return. He was also known as Hamdi the ostentatious.
