= Celadet Alî Bedirxan =

Kurdish writer (1893–1951)

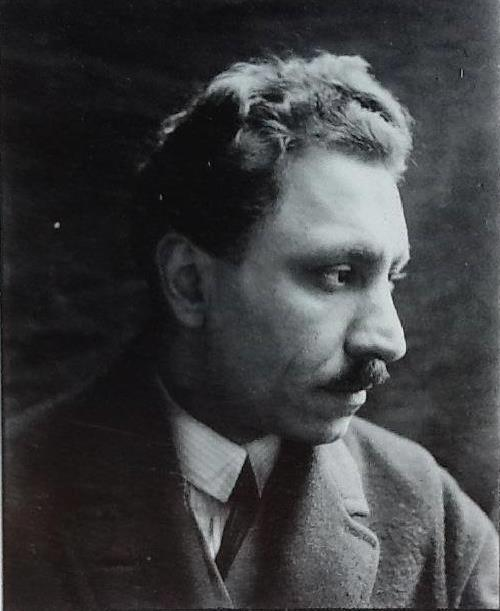
- Born: 26 April 1893; Istanbul, Ottoman Empire
- Died: July 15, 1951 (aged 58); Damascus, Syria
- Occupations: Diplomat, writer, linguist, journalist, political activist.
- Writing career
- Notable work: Hawar alphabet

Celadet Alî Bedirxan (Note: Also Djeladet Bedir Khan, among other spellings.) (Kurdish: جەلادەت عەلی بەدرخان; 26 April 1893, Istanbul – 15 July 1951, Damascus), also known as Mîr Celadet, was a Kurdish diplomat, writer, linguist, journalist, political activist and nobleman. He held a master's degree in law from Istanbul University, completed his studies at the Ludwig-Maximilians-Universität München, and spoke several languages including Arabic, Kurdish, Russian, German, Turkish, Persian and French. He left Turkey in 1923 when the Kemalists declared a new republic. In 1927, at a Kurdish conference held in Beirut, a committee was formed, the Xoybûn. He is known for having been the first modern linguist to compile and organise the grammar of the modern form of the Northern Kurdish language, Kurmanji, and having designed the Latin-based Hawar alphabet, which is now the formal alphabet of Kurmanji and is also sometimes used for the other dialects of the Kurdish Language, having replaced the Arabic-based, Cyrillic-based, Persian-based and Armenian-based alphabets formerly used for Kurmanji.

== Life ==
Celadet was born to Emin Ali Bedir Khan, son of the last emir of the Emirate of Bohtan, Bedir Khan Beg, and Seniha Hanım, who was possibly a Yezidi Princess. Sources differ as to his birthplace: according to Kurdish sources he was born in a suburb of Constantinople, Turkey; however, according to Encyclopædia Britannica, he was born in Syria. He attended the Galatasaray High School until he and his family were exiled in 1906. After his family returned from their exile, he followed up on his studies at the Vefa High School in Constantinople. He obtained a master's degree in law from Istanbul University and worked within the Ottoman juridical bureaucracy in Edirne. During World War I he was an officer of the Ottoman army and stationed in Eastern Anatolia. After the end of the war, he settled in Constantinople and began to work as a lawyer.

In 1919, Celadet and his brother Kamuran Ali Bedirxan accompanied British officer Edward Noel in his travels through Iraq. Noel was assessing the possibility of the creation of an official nation of Kurdistan. The activities between the Bedir Khan brothers and the British diplomats were met with opposition by the Kemalists, and in 1921 Celadet left for Munich and studied at the Ludwig-Maximilians-Universität München. In 1923, the Kemalists sentenced the two brothers to death in absentia. He stayed in Germany until 1925, when he joined his family in Egypt.

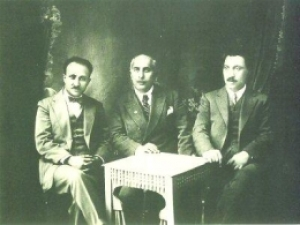
Bedir Khan brothers: Kamuran Bedir Khan (1895– 1978), Süreyya Bedir Khan (1883–1938), and Celadet Bedir Khan

In 1927, at a conference of Kurdish nationalists held in Beirut, a committee was formed, the Xoybûn, to coordinate the movement. Celadet Ali Badirkhan was elected as the first president of this committee. Three years later, the Xoybûn became involved in the Kurdish independence movement in Ağrı Province, called Republic of Ararat. In the course of the rebellion, he was occupied with finding support for the Kurdish cause of either the British or the Soviets. After the defeat of the Ararat movement, he moved to Iran. Reza Shah Pahlavi, King of Iran, tried to persuade him to stay away from the Kurdish nationalist movement, and offered him a consulate job, but had him expelled from the country when he did not agree. Then he moved to Iraq, but also the British did not want him to stay, and Bedirxan finally moved to Syria in 1931 where he lived his remaining two decades in exile. He and other French investors unsuccessfully attempted to achieve a development of the lands in Syria which formerly were part of the Emirate of Bohtan.

After the defeat of Kurdish nationalist movements in Turkey, Iraq and Iran, he devoted himself to the Kurdish cultural issues. During his last years, he faced severe economic problems, and worked as a farmer. Celadet died in Damascus in 1951, either in a traffic accident or after falling down a well on his farm.

== Work ==
During his stay in the French Mandate of Syria and Libanon, he focused on developing a Latin alphabet for the Kurdish language. In 1931, he published the Kurdish grammar book Bingehên gramera kurdmancî. The French authorities in Syria permitted his publishing of a Kurdish-oriented cultural magazine, Hawar, beginning on 15 May 1932. It was initially bi-monthly, and primarily in Kurdish, with three or four pages per issue in French. Although the first 23 issues, from 1932 to 1935, were published using both the Arabic alphabet and the Latin alphabet, his principal purpose was the further development and spread of the Latin-based alphabet he had developed for northern Kurdish (i.e., Kurmanji). From the issue number 24 onwards, Hawar only used Latin script. Between 1935 and 1941, Celadet paused the publication of the magazine as he was focusing on his activities as a lawyer and professor for French in Damascus. Between 1941 and 1943, the remainder of the issues were published. From 1942 until 1945, he published a separate monthly journal named Ronahî, comprising 28 issues. He was also supportive of other Kurdish literature and magazines, such as the Baghdad-based Gelawej. In 1970, the French translation of his book on Kurdish grammar was published in France.

== Literature ==
- Nivêjên Êzidiyan (The prayers of Yazidis)
- Ji Mesela Kurdistanê (About the Kurdistan Problem), in Hawar journal, vol.45
- Elfabêya Kurdî û Bingehên gramera kurdmancî (Kurdish Alphabet and The Basics of Kurmanji Grammar)
- Bedir Khan, Djeladet Ali & Roger Lescot, Grammaire kurde: (dialect kurmandji), Paris: J. Maisonneuve, (Librairie d'Amerique et d'Orient), 1991 (also Paris: Maisonneuve, 1970).

== Bibliography ==
- Life and Works of Celadet Alî Bedirxan, in Kurdish.
- About the Life of Celadet Elî Bedîrxan, by Mahmut Hocaoglu, in Kurdish.
- The Life of Celadet Alî Bedirxan, in German.
- "Jeladet Bedir Xan (1893–1951)", Kurdish Academy of Language. Retrieved 15 January 2015.
- "Badr Khani Jaladat", Encyclopædia Britannica. Retrieved 15 January 2015.
- Elfabêya kurdî & Bingehên gramera kurdmancî (Kurdish Alphabet and The Basics of Kurdish Grammar)
- The story of a Kurdish prince in exile: Jeladet Ali Bedir Xan
