= Emin Ali Bedir Khan =

Kurdish diplomat

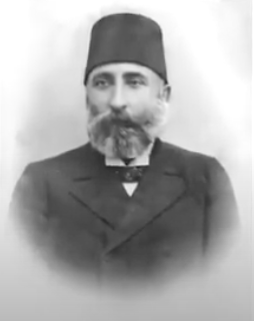
- Born: 1851/1852; Kandiye, Crete, Ottoman Empire
- Died: 1926; Cairo, Egypt
- Occupation(s): Judge, politician
- Children: Celadet Bedir Khan; Kamuran Alî Bedirxan; Süreyya Bedir Khan

Emin Ali Bedir Khan (also Bedirhan, Ottoman Turkish: امین علی بدرخان; 1851/1852 – 1926) was an Ottoman and Kurdish politician and judge. He was a founding member of the Kurdish Society for Cooperation and Progress and vice president of the Society for the Elevation of Kurdistan.

Emin Ali was born in Kandiye on Crete to Bedir Khan Beg, the last hereditary ruler of the Principality of Bohtan, and his spouse Rewshen. He worked as an official in the Ottoman judicial system in various cities. He became involved in Kurdish politics and in 1918 advocated for the establishment of an independent Kurdistan. He was one of the Kurdish representatives at the Paris Peace Conference following World War I. Shortly before the establishment of the Republic of Turkey, he went into exile in Egypt, where he died in 1926. His sons Süreyya, Celadet and Kamuran are remembered as prominent figures in the Kurdish nationalist movement.

== Early life ==
Emin Ali Bedir Khan was born in Kandiye (modern-day Heraklion) on Crete in 1851 or 1852. He was the son of Bedir Khan Beg, the last hereditary ruler of the Principality of Bohtan, and his spouse Rewshen. His family had been exiled to Crete. He attended an Ottoman state school and after his graduation began a career in the Ottoman judicial system. At the age of sixteen, he left Crete at the age of sixteen and became an apprentice in the bureaucracy, working in Syria and then in Constantinople (Istanbul). His first appointment was in Kandiye, where he returned in 1873.

== Professional career ==
In the 1880s, he became a judicial inspector and worked in various cities and courts of the Ottoman Empire trying to implement the judicial reforms which had been issued in 1879. In 1888, he was dismissed from his post, and he was apparently without any work until 1894, when he was appointed first to the city council of Constantinople. In the early 1900s, he was again appointed as a judicial inspector and was sent to several cities throughout the Empire such as Edirne or Ankara.

=== Exile from 1906–1908 ===
In 1906, the career of Emin Ali took a sudden turn as he was sent into exile after his cousin Abdürrezzak Bedir Khan and his brother Ali Şamil Bedir Khan were charged with being involved in the murder of Ridvan Pasha, the Mayor of Constantinople.

== Engagements in Kurdish organizations ==
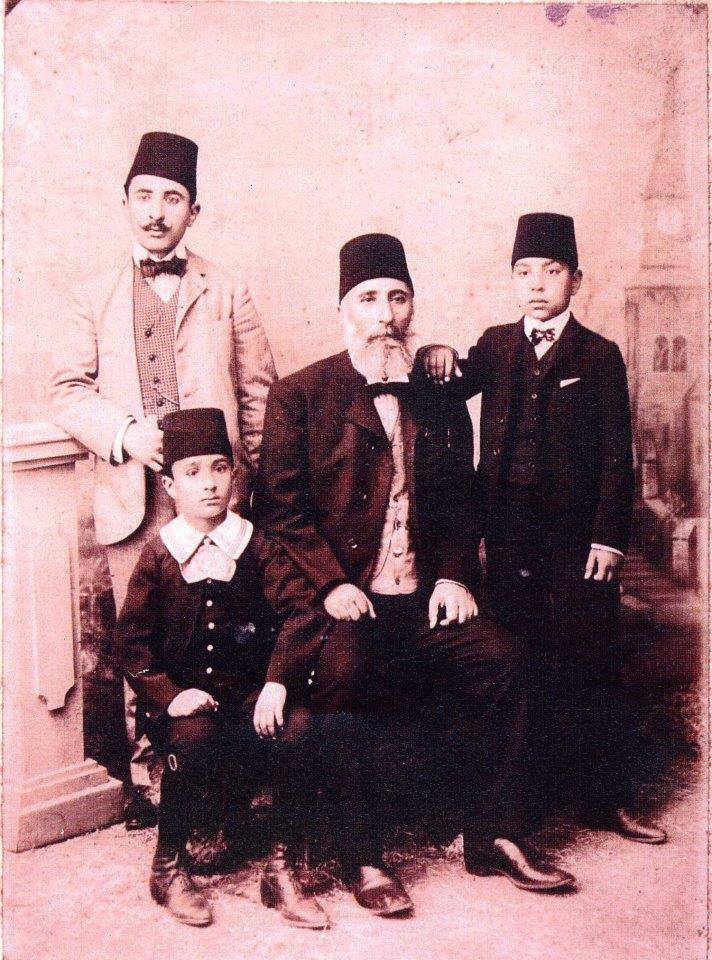
Judge Emin-Ali and his family

Following the Young Turks Revolution against Sultan Abdulhamid II he was allowed to return to Constantinople and in 1908 he became a founding member of the Kurdish Society for Cooperation and Progress. At the time he established close ties with Abdulkadir Ubeydullah, as he was also a member of the Kurdish movement. But the Society was banned in 1909 by the ruling Committee of Union and Progress (CUP) as it did not see any benefit in a Kurdish organization. In 1918 he was elected vice president of the Society for the Elevation of Kurdistan, opposing the election of Abdulkadir Ubeydullah as President. But the disputes continued as Ubeydullah advocated for autonomy within a future Turkish state, while Emin Ali Bedir Khan was in favor of Kurdish independence but also the recognition of the Ottoman sultan as caliph by the future Kurdish state. Emin Ali was also an active participant in the negotiations of the Paris Peace Conference. He maintained the view that the province of Van should be included in a Kurdistan, opposing Şerif Pasha who represented the Society for the Elevation of Kurdistan at the Peace Negotiations in Paris. He wrote a to the president of the peace conference in Paris and also presented to Richard Webb, the British representative in Istanbul, a map of the territories which he envisioned as part of a future Kurdish state.

Emin Ali would go on to establish the Society for Kurdish Social Organizations which advocated for an independent Kurdistan. He did not give up on the Kurdish cause and established ties with Greek diplomats whose support he was able to gain. Then he and his son, Celadet Bedir Khan, also requested the support of the British, to facilitate a Kurdish uprising in Mosul, but they declined to support the cause. As the creation of a Turkish republic was now imminent, he went into exile in Egypt, where he died in 1926.

== Cultural interests ==
Emin Ali was interested in Kurdish literature and wrote Kurdish poetry, he was also passionate about western classical music. He was fluent in Greek, French, Arabic, Turkish and Kurdish.

== Family ==
He was married twice and was the father of eight children: Sureyya, Celadet, Kamuran, Hikmet, Tevfik, Safder, Bedirhan and Meziyet.
