= Mikdad Midhat Bedir Khan =

Kurdish journalist

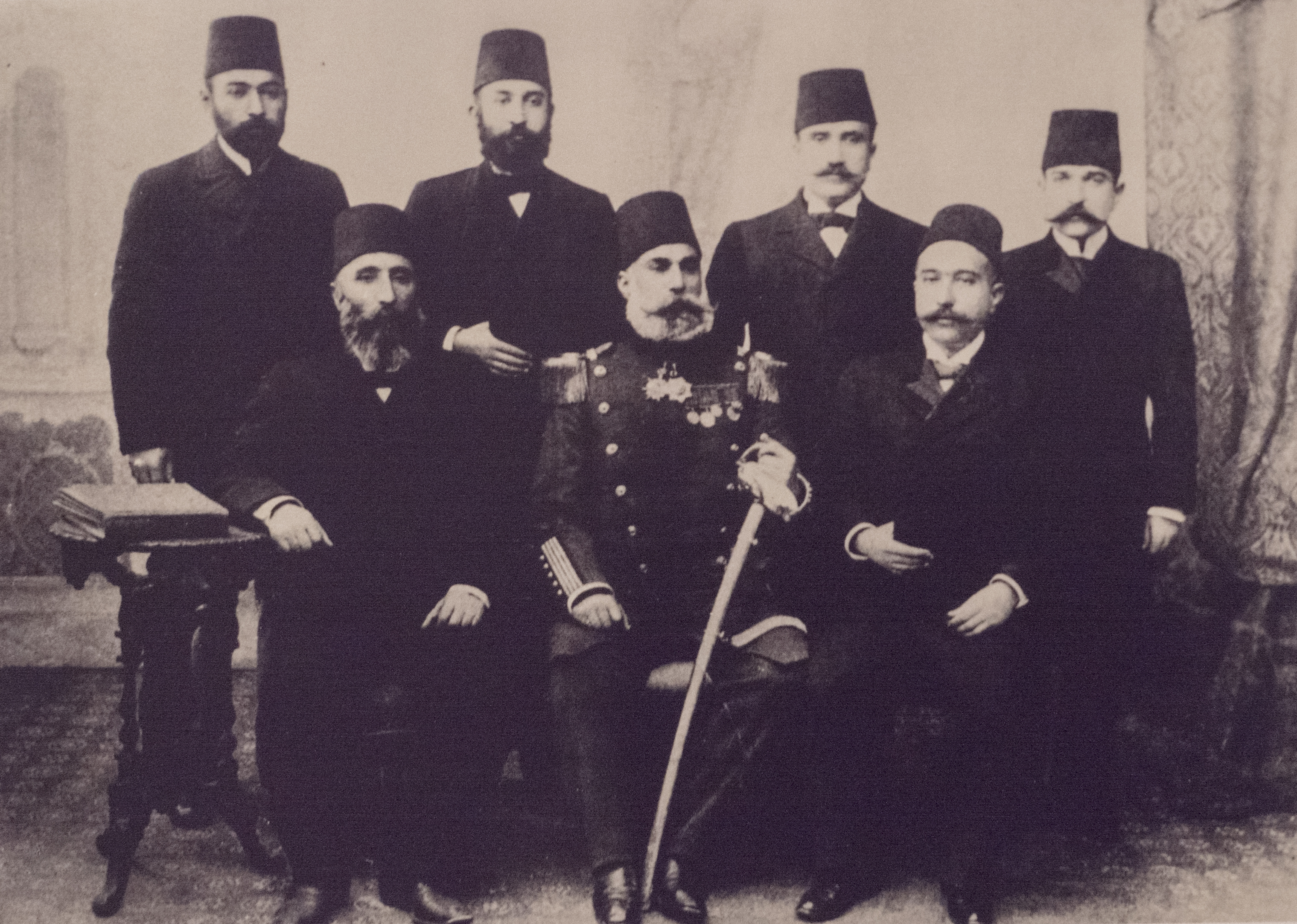
- Mikdad Midhat (top row, second from right) and other members of the Bedir Khan family in around 1880
- Born: Crete, Ottoman Empire
- Occupation: Journalist
- Years active: 1880-1912
- Known for: Publishing the newspaper Kurdistan

Mikdad Midhat Bedir Khan (1858 – 1915) was a Kurdish nationalist and journalist who published the first ever Kurdish language newspaper, Kurdistan, in 1898. He was also a son of Bedir Khan Beg, the last Kurdish Mîr and mutesellim of the Emirate of Botan.

Bedir Khan was born in Crete, but returned to Constantinople and was educated at Üsküdar Military High School and then the Imperial High School at Galatasaray (Mekteb-i Sultanî) and after graduation took a job in the Ottoman bureaucracy. Writing in the British Journal of Middle Eastern Studies about Bedir Khan's upbringing, Bajalan notes that "Ottoman policies of co-option created Kurdish ‘stakeholders’ in the imperial system—an enlightened and educated noblesse oblige that, on the whole, regarded themselves as both loyal Ottomans and proud Kurds."

The first edition of Kurdistan was published in Cairo on April 22, 1898. During its four years of publication, Kurdistan was printed in Egypt, England and Switzerland. The last two issues were published on 14 March 1902 in Geneva.

At the time, it was difficult to publish in Kurdish "because of the absence of a standard language, or even a dominant dialect." The newspaper was therefore a bilingual mix of the Kurmanji dialect of Botan, and Turkish. Speakers of other dialects had difficulty understanding it.

The newspaper was critical of Abdul Hamid II and the Hamidian regime generally, as well as of the Kurdish tribal leader Mustafa Pasha, who controlled the region which had been part of the Emirate of Botan after the 1877-78 Russo-Turkish War. The newspaper also featured Kurdish literary works and tributes to famous Kurdish poets. The third issue contained a eulogy for the Kurdish poet Haji Qadir Koyi. Ahmad Khani was also honoured by Kurdistan.

Stansfield and Sharif, writing in The Kurdish Question Revisited, also note that Kurdistan supported the Young Turk reformers who wanted to oust Sultan Abdul Hamid II and reinstate the constitution: "Kurdistan was also a CUP newspaper. It reported on the activities of the CUP and the Young Turk movement, and in so doing distinguished itself as a forum for opposing the Hamidian regime". Bajalan also notes that "the paper advocated the restoration of the Constitution of 1876. This, it was believed, would serve as a panacea to both the Ottoman Empire’s problems and those of the Kurds."

Following the Young Turk Revolution in 1908, the Bedir Khan family returned to Turkey, but in 1912 went into exile again when they discovered that the CUP intended to repress the Kurdish nationalist movement in the Ottoman Empire. They remained in exile after the founding of the Turkish republic by Mustafa Kemal Atatürk in 1923.
