= Bedir Khan Beg =

Kurdish emir (1803–1869)

Emir of Bohtan
- Reign: 1821–1847
- Predecessor: Seyfeddin beg
- Successor: Yezdanşêr
- Born: 1803; Cizre, Şırnak, Bohtan
- Died: 1869 (aged 65–66); Damascus, Ottoman Empire
- Burial: Damascus, Syria
Names
- Mîr Bedîrxan Begê Bûhtî
- House: Azizan dynasty
- Father: Abdullah Beg
- Religion: Sunni Islam

Bedir Khan Beg (Kurmanji: Bedirxan Beg, Turkish: Bedirhan Bey; 1803–1869) was the last Kurdish Mir and mütesellim of the Emirate of Botan. He was also subjected to the rule of the Mir of Soran who besieged him.

Hereditary head of the house of Rozhaki whose seat was the ancient Bitlis Castle and descended from Sharafkhan Bidlisi, Bedir Khan was born in Cizre (now in Turkey) of Azizan family. He became the Mir of the Emirate of Botan in 1821 and ruled until 1847. The Bedir Khans also claimed descent from Muhammad's general Khalid ibn al-Walid, but later renounced such claims after the rise of nationalism in the Ottoman Empire.

== Early life ==
He was born to Abdullah Bey, and became the ruler of Botan after his cousin Sayfuddin (who succeeded Abdullah Bey after his death), wasn't able to calm down the region and his brother Said Bey was too religious and left the leadership to Bedir Khan. During his first term as Mir, he soon established a regional control strong enough, that allowed him to deny his support to the Ottoman Sultan during the Russo-Turkish War between 1828 and 1829. He managed to develop the war-torn districts under his control and within years, the population in the area in his control grew significantly. His success was such, that European diplomats from the region reported to their governments about Bedir Khan's ability to provide his followers with a good economic standard and security, comparing with other neighboring regions. Bedir Khan was proud of the security he brought to the region, that under his leadership, banditry had disappeared and caravans were able to cross his territory in safety. Bedir Khan Beg was repeatedly responsible for massacres of the Yazidis. In 1832, thousands of Yazidis were killed in the Shekhan area by Bedir Khan Beg in cooperation with the Kurdish Soran prince Muhammad Pasha of Rawanduz. But he was not always on good terms with Muhammad Pasha, in 1828, his army had to defend the Emirate from him. In 1832, Mir Muhammad of Rawanduz conquered Jazira the capital of Bohtan and brought Bedir Khan under his rule. In 1836, the Ottomans attacked and defeated him, and Bedir Khan renewed his vow of allegiance to the Sultan In 1838, the Ottoman Reshid Pasha conquered Cizre and Bedir Khan began to lose his power due to the centralist policies of the Ottoman Empire, which culminated in the Tanzimat Edict of 1839 and its application the following year. Following the Battle of Nizip in 1839, in which Bedir Khan took part and sent 30,000 soldiers in aid for the Ottoman side, he emerged as the dominant Kurdish ruler in central Kurdistan. He raised taxes, minted his own coins and organized the justice system. The security in Bohtan gave him such popularity among its inhabitants, that many families from neighboring districts settled in the Emirate of Bohtan. This led to a dispute with the Vali of Mosul, who in 1842 wanted to integrate the district of Cizre into the province of Mosul, an aim, to which the population of Cizre did not agree to. By 1845, Bedir Khan beg ruled over a region spanning from Diyarbakir to Mosul in the west to Urmia in the east. As it was known that he had planned the modernization of his troops by creating cross-tribal militias constituted by soldiers of several tribes and that the friday sermons were shouted in his name, the central Ottoman Government decided to end the emerging independence movement of Bedir Khan.

== Triple alliance ==
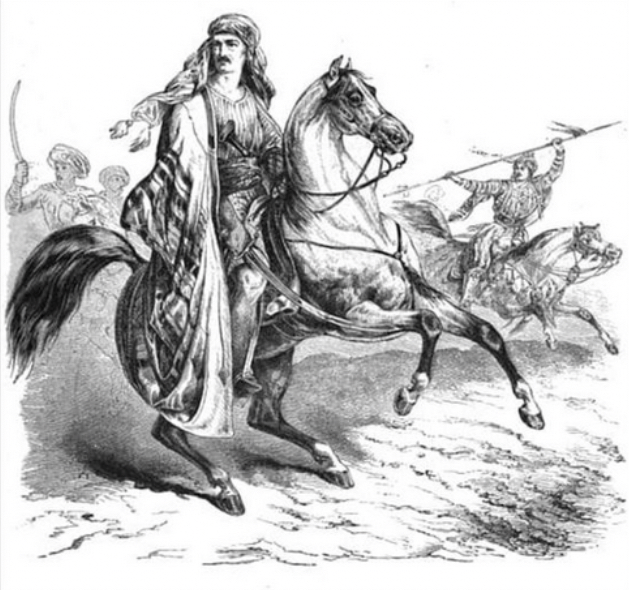
A portrait of Bedir Khan Beg

Following the Battle of Nizip, Bedir Khan allied himself with Han Mahmud of Müküs and Nurullah Bey of Hakkari in 1840 to a triple alliance. As the Ottomans decided to detach Cizre from Diyarbakir and have it joined to the Mosul Eyalet, Bedr Khan opposed the decision and would not submit to the authority of the Vali of Mosul. In the meantime, Han Mahmoud of Müküs unsuccessfully attempted to conquer the area around Bitlis. The triple alliance entered in conflict with the local Assyrian Christian population, and perpetrated massacres amongst them in 1843 and 1846. The conflict arose, as Assyrians in the area between Urmia, Mosul and Hakkari, decided to refuse their accorded tribute to the Emir of Hakkari in 1841. After Nurullah Bey unsuccessfully attempted to subdue the Assyrians led by Shimun XVII Abraham, he called for the assistance by Bedir Khan Beg. In 1843, Bedir Khan broke their resistance and Mar Shimun took refuge in Mosul. And also in 1844 in the Tur Abdin mountains, Yazidis were again raided by Bedir Khan Beg. Bedir Khan Beg's goal was to force the Yazidis to convert to Islam. According to his courtiers, Bedir Khan was the scourge of infidels, and the greatest Kurd since Saladin. Under his rule, the Yazidis had little to no civil rights in accordance with Islamic law.

Pressure from the European Powers to stop the massacres of Christians led to Ottoman forces invading his territories in 1846–7, with Omer Pasha's 12,000 strong Ottoman force, which was supported by Yazidi tribesmen seeking revenge, defeating the Kurdish army in the field near Zeitun, Cizre. He was forced to flee to Evruh castle, where he endured an eight months long siege. Bedir Khan had to surrender to the Ottomans at Evreh Castle in Eruh, Siirt on the 4 July 1847. The same day also Han Mahmud was defeated in Tatvan. Bedir Khan was betrayed by Yezdanşer a distant relative and high ranking commander of his forces, who had joined the Ottoman Army in exchange of promises of a rank in the government. Yezdanşer would become appointed the mütesellim of Cizre for a short time. From Evreh castle Bedir Khan and his family were put in chains and taken to Kumçati in the Şırnak province. After 40 days in detention, Bedir Khan and his family were transferred to Constantinople.

== Exile in Crete ==
After Bedir Khan's hopes that he would be allowed to settle in Constantinople were not fulfilled, he and his entourage were sent to Heraklion, Crete, which at the time was governed by the Ottoman Empire. In 1853 he requested twice to be allowed to return to Istanbul, but his demands were turned down. In 1855 he purchased a farm just outside of Heraklion, which he named “Kabıl Hora“. As in 1856 a strong earthquake occurred in Crete, he faced financial calamities due to the destructions of his possessions. His salary which he still received from the Ottoman Empire, was only 7000 Kuruş. After Bedir Khan managed to solve the quarrels between the Christians and Muslims on the island, the situation became better. In September 1857, Sultan Abdul Majid changed his approach towards Bedir Khan, doubling his salary, and granting 43 of his followers to return to Kurdistan. Nevertheless, Bedir Khan decided to stay in Crete.

== Return and death ==
In 1863, Sultan Abdul Aziz, the successor of Abdul Majid, allowed Bedir Khan and his family to settle in Istanbul, where they bought a mansion in the Fatih quarter. Several of his descendants were admitted into the bureaucracy of the Ottoman Empire. In June 1868, Bedir Khan decided to settle in present-day Syria. He traveled by ship to Beirut and from there he moved to Damascus. Bedir Khan Beg died a year after he settled in Damascus. His funeral was held at the cemetery of Rukneddin, Damascus.

== Family ==
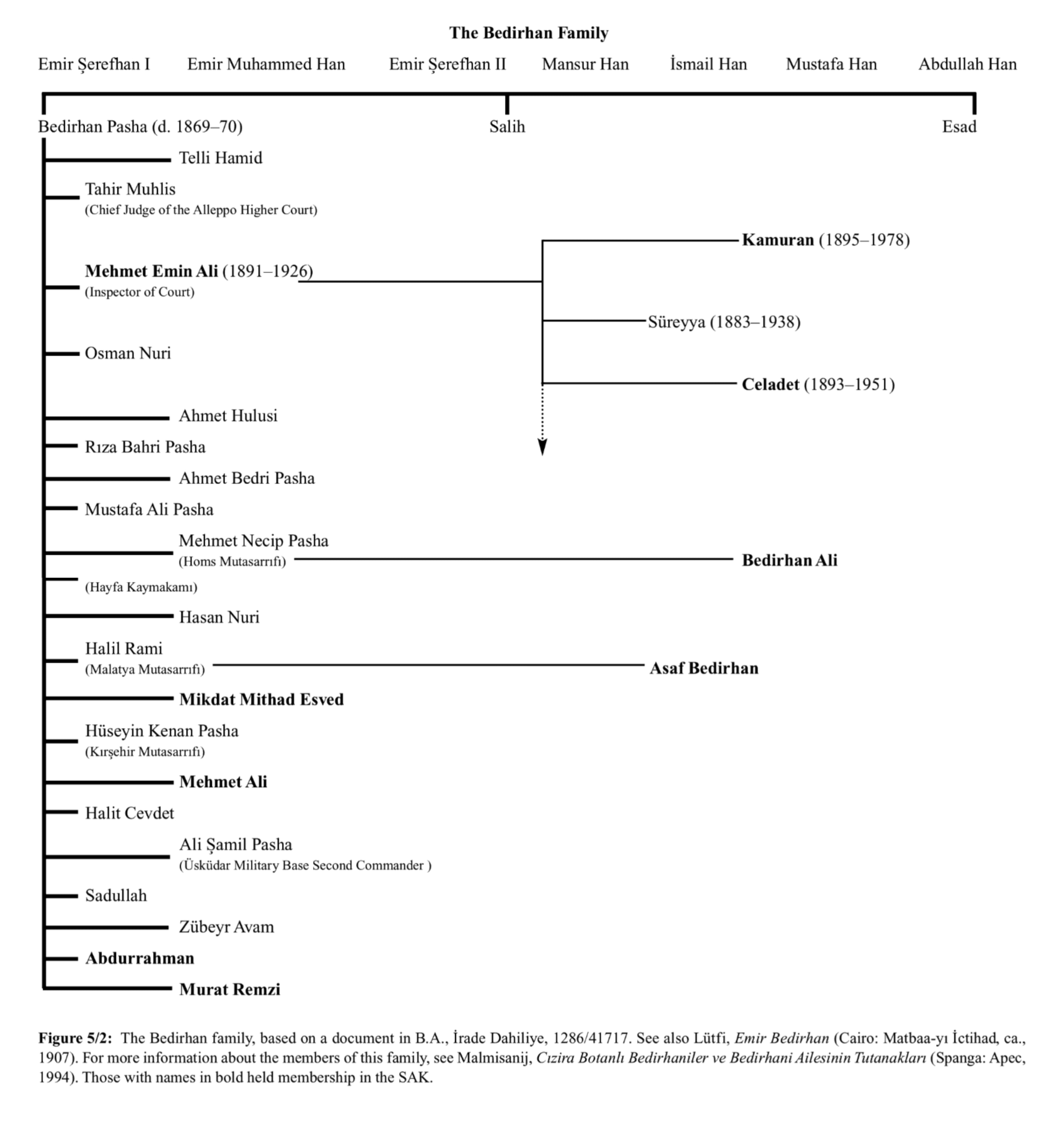
Bedirkhanis family

Bedir Khan Beg was married several times, according to his son Mehmed, he had sixteen wives. Emin Ali Bedir Khan is one of his sons and Celadet Bedir Khan, Süreyya Bedir Khan and Kamuran Alî Bedirxan are his grandchildren. He was the father of twenty-one children.

== See also ==
- Mikdad Midhat Bedir Khan
- Bedir Khan Beg's Campaign Against the Assyrians
