= Hawar (magazine) =

Kurdish literature magazine (1932–1943)

Hawar (meaning The Cry in English) was a Kurdish literature magazine, which was published in Damascus between 1932 and 1943. The magazine was first issued by Celadet Alî Bedirxan on 15 May 1932. The magazine was the first Kurdish literary magazine in Syria and it was intended to publish it on a monthly basis, but its publication was interrupted several times. The first 23 issues were published between 15 May 1932 and the 27 September 1935. The issues number 24 - 26 appeared between 1 April 1934 and 18 August 1935. The remainder was published between April 1941 and August 1943, and the French, who governed Syria and Lebanon at the time, supported its publication. The 57th and last issue was released on 15 August 1943. The first 23 issues of the magazine were published in both the Latin and the Arabic alphabets, but from the 24th issue onward, only the Latin alphabet was used. The Kurdish alphabet, which was formulated by the publisher Celadet Alî Bedirxan and also referred to as Hawar alphabet or the Bedirxan alphabet, was used to publish Hawar. The texts which were published emphasized the value of the Kurdish folklore for developing the Kurdish language and personal qualities. Hawar had its most subscribers in Syria and Iraq, but also Lebanon, Iran. Some educational institutions and libraries in Europe and the Middle East also subscribed to the Hawar magazine. Since 2006, the 15 May, the date of the first publication of Hawar in 1932, is celebrated as the Kurdish language day.

Celadet Alî Bedirxan said of his purpose for the magazine: "Hawar is the voice of knowledge. Knowledge leads to personal reflection. A person who becomes aware of the inner-self desires freedom and happiness. Self-knowledge also leads to self-expression. This magazine will reflect those expressions in the Kurdish language".
