= Edward Noel (Indian Army officer) =

British diplomat

Lieutenant-Colonel Edward William Charles Noel CIE DSO (14 April 1886 – 10 December 1974) was a British officer, diplomat and spy.

== Relatives ==
The grandson of Charles Noel, 2nd Earl of Gainsborough his father was the Earl's second son Edward Noel, his mother, Ruth Lucas. He was the elder brother of Captain Noel an English mountaineer and filmmaker, best known for his film of the 1924 British Mount Everest expedition alongside George Mallory and Andrew Irvine. He was educated at The Oratory School, Birmingham and the Royal Military Academy, Woolwich. Commissioned initially in the Royal Garrison Artillery, he transferred to the Indian Army in 1908.

He cycled from England to India twice, in 1909 and 1910.

== Political career ==
In 1915, he was appointed Vice-Consul to Ahwaz in Persia and Consul for Kerman and Persian Baluchistan in 1929. He aided Peter Polovtsov, a tsarist general to escape from Russia in 1918. Then, while carrying despatches for Dunsterforce, Noel was held hostage by the Jangalis in 1919. He became a Companion of the Order of the Indian Empire in the 1918 New Year Honours and was awarded the Distinguished Service Order in 1919. In the aftermath of the World War I, he supported a creation of an independent Kurdistan and made extensive excursions through the region and had established good relations with descendants of Bedir Khan Beg and Sheikh Ubeydullah.

== Honours ==
He was awarded the Distinguished Service Order (D.S.O.) in 1919. He was Political Agent for Kurram Agency in FATA in 1924. He commissioned to build a rest house in the Chapri forest in Parachinar. He was Consul to Kerman and Persian Baluchistan in 1929. He was Deputy Commissioner of Dehra Ismail Khan in 1931. He was Director of Agriculture and Allied Departments, North-West Frontier Provinces in 1933. He gained the rank of Lieutenant-Colonel in the Indian Army.
