= Bohtan =

Kurdish principality in the Ottoman Empire

- 1161/1247/1335–1855
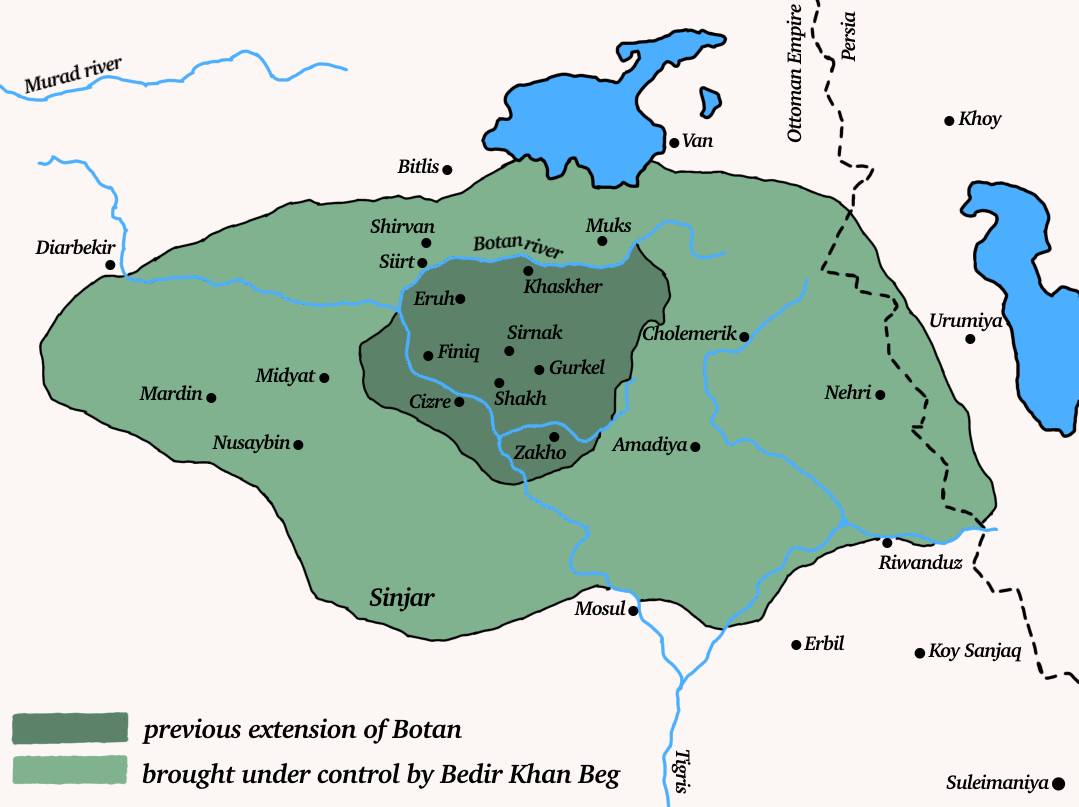
- Bohtan Emirate after the captures of Bedir Khan Beg in 1846
- Status: Sovereign state (before 1514); Vassal of the Ottoman Empire
- Capital: Cizre
- Religion: Yazidism, Sunni Islam (from 14th century)
- Government: Principality
- Mir
  - 1821–1847: Bedir Khan Beg (last)
- History
  - Established: 1161/1247/1335
  - Disestablished: 1855
Preceded by	Succeeded by
Zengid dynasty; Ayyubid Sultanate	Ottoman Empire
- Today part of: Turkey, Syria, Iraq, Iran

Bohtan (Note: also known as Buhtan, Bokhti, Botan, Cizre-Botan, Bokhtan) was a medieval Kurdish principality in the Ottoman Empire centered on the town of Jazirah ibn 'Omar in northern Mesopotamia (or northern Jazira). The official religion of this principality was Yezidism in 14th century, although the rulers eventually converted to Islam. Bohtan constituted the third major Yezidi enclave after Shekhan and Sinjar until the 19th century.

== History ==
=== Origin ===
The earliest known reference to the region now called Botan appears in the works of Herodotus (484–426 BC). He identified a land known as “Bukht and ikh” as part of the Achaemenid Empire’s dominions. Over the centuries, the name gradually shifted in pronunciation and form, evolving through Bokhti and Buhtan before becoming Botan.

It is not fully clear when the Bohtan Emirate was exactly established. According to Sharafnama, Botan rulers are descendants of Suleman Khalid, the Bokhti tribal chief. He was succeeded by his eldest son Abdulaziz, whom all the Botan rulers are descended, hence why the ruling dynasty was called Azizan. Abdul-aziz and appointed each of his brothers (Mir Abdal and Mir Badir) as Governors of a districts of the emirate. While there's no recorded date on when it was established, Sharafkhan wrote in Sharafnama that the eighth Botan ruler, Mir Ezzaddin Abdal in 1394 went to Mardin to swore his allegiance to Timur. Kurdish historians conflict on the exact date of Botan Emirate establishment, according to Anwar Al-Maei, the Emirate was established in 1161 by Abdulaziz succeeding the Zengids rule. While according to Muhammad Amin Zaki, the Botan Emirate was established in 1247.

=== Early years ===
Cizre was seized by the Bohtan tribe in 1336/1337 with the aid of al-Ashraf, Ayyubid Emir of Hisn Kayfa. In the 1330s, Hamdallah Mustawfi in Nuzhat Al Qulub reported that Jazirat Ibn ʿUmar had an annual revenue of 170,200 dinars. The emirate of Hisn Kayfa had aimed to control Jazirat Ibn ʿUmar through the Bohtan clan in providing military assistance to its capture and the marriage of a daughter to Izz ed-Din, Emir of Bohtan, but this was unsuccessful as the Bohtan emirate developed the city and consolidated their rule, and eventually the emir of Hisn Kayfa attempted to take Jazirat Ibn ʿUmar by force in 1384/1385, but was repelled.

The principality ruled over an area extending from Diyarbakir to Van and from Zakho to Sinjar at its peak. The first governors of Bohtan, were from the Azizan family, who originally followed Yezidism later converted to Sunni Islam and were related to the Governors of the Principality of Bitlis. Following their role in the Ottoman defeat of the Safavids in the Battle of Çaldiran in 1514, Bohtan was granted the status of a Hükümet, and it became a hereditary Kurdish principality within the Ottoman Empire.

=== Bedirxan beg's reign ===
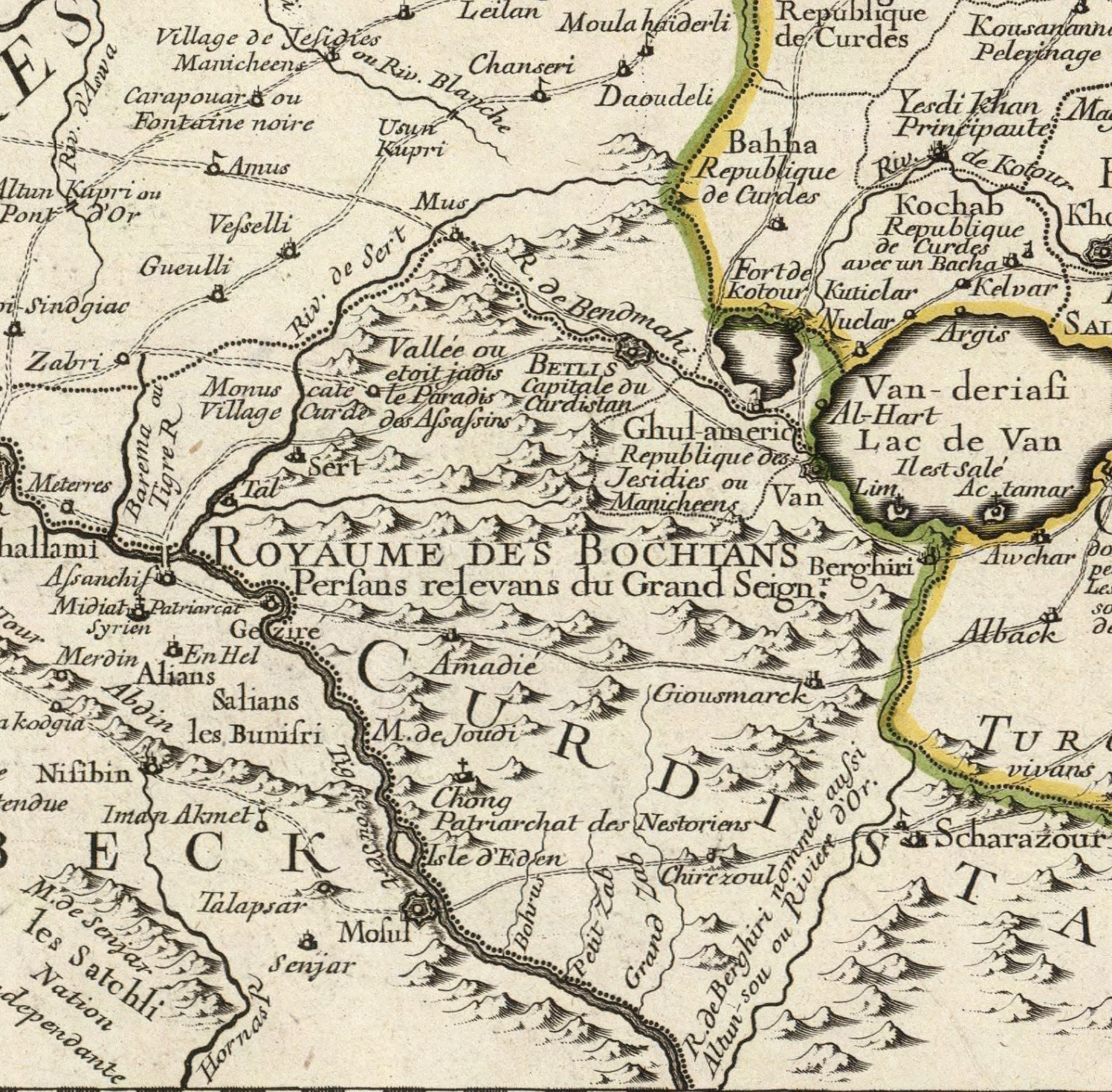
"Royaume des Bochtans" from Guillaume Delisle's 1723 map.

An important Mir of Bohtan was Bedir Khan Bey, who succeeded Mir Seyfeddin. Bedir Khan Bey was Mîr of the principality between 1821 and 1847. He reformed the military forces in establishing an elite force consistent with members of the several tribes within the emirate which brought security into Bohtan. According to European diplomats in the region, he even tested if the regional chief was observant enough. He would try to raid a tribe by night, and if he succeeded he would punish the tribal chief in whose territory the robbery was successful. He then returned what he had robbed the night before.

The security standard in Bohtan was such, that it encouraged the population of neighboring provinces to move into the territory under Bedir Khans control. This led to the opposition by the Ottoman Vali of Mosul, who demanded an end to the emigration of the habitants from the Mosul province to Bohtan. Following, Bedir Khan expelled 2000 immigrants who settled into Bohtan during the Governorship of Mehmet Pasha in Mosul, but they returned after four years. The renewed emigration lead the Vali of Mosul Mehmet Şerif Pasha to file a report against Bedir Khan, who in 1847 had to agree to bring an end to the immigration of foreigners in Bohtan. Bedir Khan Bey resigned after an unsuccessful uprising against the Ottoman Empire and following, Bohtan lost its independence.

== List of bohtan rulers ==
list of Bukhti rulers of Bohtan:

- Amir Sulaiman ibn Khalid al-Bukhti (13th–14th century)
- Amir Abdul Aziz ibn Sulaiman Al-Bukhti (14th century)
- Amir 'Izz ad-Din Ahmad ibn Sayf ad-Din Al-Bukhti (r. 1335–1362)
- Amir Sayf ad-Din Isa Ibn Izz ad-Din Ahmad Al-Bukhti (r. 1362–1383)
- Amir Abdal Bokhti (Abdullah) (r. 1383–1387)
- Amir Mir Ezzaddin Abdal Bokhti (r. 1387–1417)
- Amir Majd ad-Din (r. 1417–1436)
- Amir Abdal (r. 1437–1455)
- Amir bedro (Bedir) beg (r. 1455–1469)
- Amir Sharafkhan (15th century)
- Bedirxan Beg (r. 1821–1847)

== See also ==
- List of Kurdish dynasties and countries

== Sources ==
- Sinclair, T.A. (1989). Eastern Turkey: An Architectural & Archaeological Survey, Vol. III. Pindar Press. ISBN 9780907132349.
- Ghalib, Sabah Abdullah (2011), The Emergence of Kurdism with Special Reference to the Three Kurdish Emirates within the Ottoman Empire, 1800–1850 (PDF), University of Exeter, archived from the original (PDF) on 17 December 2022
- Miynat, Ali (2017). Cultural and socio-economic relations between the Turkmen states and the Byzantine empire and West with a corpus of the Turkmen coins in the Barber Institute Coin Collection (PDF).
