= First Bedirkhanis Revolt =

- Part of Timeline of Kurdish uprisings
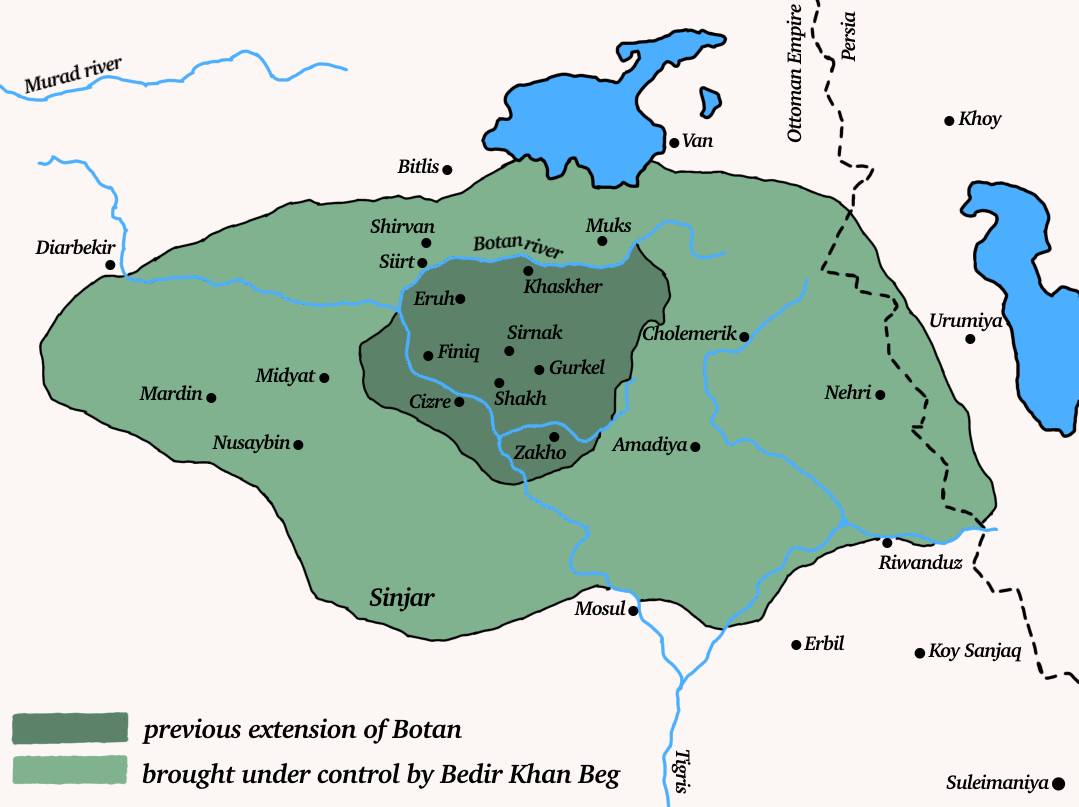
- Bohtan Emirate after the captures of Bedir Khan Beg in 1846
Date	1845–1847; 1854–1855
Location	Bohtan Emirate (modern-day southeastern Turkey)
Result	Ottoman victory: Revolt suppressed; Dissolution of the Bohtan Emirate

Belligerents
(Ottoman Empire) Ottoman Empire; Sheikhan principality	Bohtan

Commanders and leaders
(Ottoman Empire) Osman Pasha (Ottoman Empire) Omar Pasha; Mir Hussein Beg	Bedir Khan Beg; Khan Mahmud; Yezdanşêr

Strength
Unknown	Unknown

Casualties and losses
144 casualties during the Siege of Evreh Castle (29 killed, 115 wounded)	Unknown

The First Bedirkhanis Revolt was a military conflict between the Ottoman Empire and the autonomous Kurdish ruler Bedirhan Bey, the emir of Bohtan. The campaign was a part of the Ottoman centralization policies of the 19th century. The Ottomans aimed to centralize their authority in Eastern Anatolia. Following the Kurdistan campaign of 1847 which ended in the defeat and exile of Bedir Khan Beg. In August 1848, a violent conflict in the village of Weşin brought the rule of the Palu begs under the scrutiny of the Meclis-i Vâlâ (The Supreme Council of Judicial Ordinances).

The campaign ended with the defeat of Bedirhan Bey and the dissolution of the Bohtan Emirate. This event marked a major turning point in the political structure of the Kurdish principalities within the Ottoman Empire. Yezdanşêr was born to Mir Sevdin (also known as Seyfeddin), a former Mir of Bohtan. Yezdanşêr was also the grandson of Bedir Khan Beg's uncle and a commander of Bedir Khan's troops during his revolt against the Ottoman Empire in 1847. However, Yezdanşêr later betrayed Bedir Khan Beg and guided the Ottoman forces to victory. In exchange for his services, Yezdanşêr was promised some position in the Ottoman bureaucracy and after the defeat of his relative he was appointed the Mütesellim of Cizre in the Kurdistan Eyalet. He was soon replaced by an Ottoman kaymakam, sent to Constantinople in March 1849 the same year then also to Mosul. He was subsequently prohibited from returning to Cizre.

== Background ==
The suppression of the Bohtan Emirate was a significant achievement in the decline of Kurdish emirate-based authority within the Ottoman imperial system.

An important Mir of Bohtan was Bedir Khan Bey, who succeeded Mir Seyfeddin. Bedir Khan Bey was Mîr of the principality between 1821 and 1847. He reformed the military forces in establishing an elite force consistent with members of the several tribes within the emirate which brought security into Bohtan. According to European diplomats in the region, he even tested if the regional chief was observant enough. He would try to raid a tribe by night, and if he succeeded he would punish the tribal chief in whose territory the robbery was successful. He then returned what he had robbed the night before. The security standard in Bohtan was such, that it encouraged the population of neighboring provinces to move into the territory under Bedir Khans control. This led to the opposition by the Ottoman Vali of Mosul, who demanded an end to the emigration of the habitants from the Mosul province to Bohtan. Following, Bedir Khan expelled 2000 immigrants who settled into Bohtan during the Governorship of Mehmet Pasha in Mosul, but they returned after four years. The renewed emigration lead the Vali of Mosul Mehmet Şerif Pasha to file a report against Bedir Khan, who in 1847 had to agree to bring an end to the immigration of foreigners in Bohtan. Bedir Khan Bey resigned after an unsuccessful uprising against the Ottoman Empire and following, Bohtan lost its independence.

== The End of Kurdish Autonomy ==
Kurdish emirates (such as Baban, Bohtan, and Hakkari) operated under a mutual connection with the Ottoman Empire. The Ottomans relied on local Kurdish aristocrats to manage the periphery. In exchange for recognizing the Sultan’s suzerainty and providing military support, these Kurdish dynasts enjoyed significant local autonomy. The Rise of the Modern Centralized State The chapter argues that the 19th-century modern state expansion rendered this old system obsolete. Centralization: The Ottoman government began replacing decentralized, "confederal" structures with a cohesive administrative regime. Local Kurdish aristocrats were replaced by government-appointed officials sent from the imperial center. Ending the Kurdish autonomy was the formalization of the Ottoman-Iranian borders. Previously, Kurdish leaders held power in the borderlands between the two empires. As the two states moved to define a permanent, rigid border, they viewed the independent-minded Kurdish dynasts as obstacles. The removal of these local leaders made it easier to determine the borders, where borderland peoples were increasingly marginalized as the empires transformed into more modern and defined states. This period marked the dismantling of the Kurdish administrative structures that predated the Ottomans.

== Bedirkhan Beg Revolt ==
=== Alliance between Bedirhan Bey and the Kurdish emirs ===
Bedirhan Bey held a significant position due to his influence and authority in the Kurdistan region. For this reason, following the reforms introduced during the Tanzimat period, the Ottoman Empire appointed him as the mütesellim of Cizre and granted him the military rank of Redif Miralay (reserve colonel).

Following the rebellion of Han Mahmud after 1842, Bedirhan Bey’s position and his close relations with Han Mahmud led to claims that Bedirhan Bey, Han Mahmud, and Nurullah Bey had formed an alliance. However, Bedirhan Bey repeatedly rejected these accusations.

Despite his repeated denials, the Ottoman authorities remained unconvinced and continued to distrust him. During the administrative transfer of Cizre to Mosul in 1842, policies pursued by the Ottoman government contributed to the development of closer relations between Bedirhan Bey and Han Mahmud. A formal alliance only became clearly evident from 1846 onward, when other Kurdish emirs in the region joined this cooperation, transforming it into a broader political alliance.

One of the most important figures in this Kurdish alliance was Nurullah Bey, the emir of Hakkâri. He too was accused of supporting Han Mahmud’s rebellion together with Bedirhan Bey, but like Bedirhan Bey, he rejected these accusations.

After 1846, the Kurdish emirs involved in the alliance strengthened their fortresses, increased their troop numbers, and began expanding their armaments.

Bedirhan Bey established arms and gunpowder workshops, minted coins as a symbol of autonomy, and had the Friday sermon (khutba) read in his own name.

According to the British officer Claudius James Rich, when he visited Bedirhan Bey in Cizre following an imperial decree (firman), Bedirhan Bey reportedly declared:

I do not recognize any sultan. Who is this sultan? Why are his decrees sent to me? I am the master here, and I would prefer to learn why my guest has come from himself rather than from the decree in his hand.

=== Van revolt ===
Following the administrative reforms introduced in Kurdistan after the Tanzimat, Bedirhan Bey lost confidence in the central government and sought to strengthen his position by forming alliances with other Kurdish emirs, particularly Han Mahmud.

Regarding the rebellion initiated by Bedirhan Bey and other Kurdish emirs in Van, the Erzurum field marshal Esad Pasha reported to the Sublime Porte in a letter dated 22 February 1846 that unrest continued despite attempts at mediation and that Mustafa Bey of Van, Han Mahmud, Nurullah Bey, and Bedirhan Bey had rebelled against the state.

Esad Pasha later attempted to resolve the issue through negotiation with the Kurdish emirs but failed. He warned that military action should be taken regardless of the season, otherwise the rebellion would spread further.

During this period, the Russian and British consulates closely monitored the rebellion in Van and advised the Sublime Porte that it should be suppressed as soon as possible. Bedirhan Bey’s formation of an alliance with several Kurdish emirs in 1845 and his subsequent rebellion, together with increasing pressure from Western powers following his campaign against the Nestorians in 1846 demanding his punishment, led the Sublime Porte to decide to remove Bedirhan Bey. While the Ottoman Empire began military preparations, it also attempted to resolve the issue peacefully through provincial governors and intermediaries.

Initially the governor of Erzurum Hafız Pasha, sent the regional figure Sheikh Mahmud Bayazidi as an mediator, but it was inconclusive. The government made extensive efforts to persuade Bedirhan Bey. Leading Naqshbandi sheikhs were asked to advise him, and several prominent religious leaders wrote letters stating that they would support the Ottoman Empire if he ignored their counsel. Later, İsmail Nazım Efendi was sent to the region and personally met with Bedirhan Bey. İsmail Nazım Efendi departed from Istanbul on 7 September 1846 and arrived in Cizre, where several points of agreement were reached between the two parties:

- If the office of mütesellim of Cizre were assigned to another individual by the central government, Bedirhan Bey would accept the new situation and remain in his residence in Cizre, provided his honour, life, and property were protected, or he would serve as kethüda to the newly appointed official if deemed appropriate.
- If permitted to continue his emirate, he would fulfil imperial orders to the extent of his ability and ensure that those who had migrated from surrounding districts returned to their original settlements.
- He would pay in full the taxes owed from districts previously under his authority that had been attached to Mosul.
- He would provide troops from territories under his control to the Ottoman army in accordance with established regulations.
- An official appointed by the governor of Mosul would determine the amount of jizya to be collected from the Nestorians, and Bedirhan Bey would assist if necessary and would no longer interfere in its collection.
- Although Cizre was attached to Mosul, it bordered the provinces of Diyarbakır and Erzurum, whose governors had previously intervened in regional affairs. Therefore, only the governor of Mosul would show authority in this regard.

Following this meeting, Bedirhan Bey sent a letter to the sultan on 22 January 1847 declaring his loyalty and stating that he would abide by the agreed terms, accepting any punishment should he fail to do so. He also asked forgiveness for his previous actions and expressed his willingness to sacrifice his life for the sultan.

However, many Ottoman officials, including Abdulmejid I, continued to view his actions with suspicion. Their concerns were reinforced by reports that Bedirhan Bey had secretly resumed having the khutbah read in his own name.

Nazım Efendi’s report was discussed in the Meclis-i Hâs, where it was decided that despite the concessions granted to him, Bedirhan Bey remained unreliable and should be removed from Cizre.

It was concluded that he had attempted to mislead Nazım Efendi in order to gain time for military preparations. A final letter demanding submission was therefore sent to him, stating that military operations would begin if he failed to comply within one week.

Meanwhile, Bedirhan Bey sent Sheikh Yusuf of Mosul to the British consulate there, declaring that he would submit to the sultan if guarantees were provided. The British consulate forwarded a copy of the agreement to the British ambassador in Istanbul, who in turn transmitted it to the Ottoman Ministry of Foreign Affairs. This development increased suspicions within the Ottoman government regarding Bedirhan Bey’s intentions.

On 19 April 1847 an imperial rescript (Irade-i Seniyye) submitted to the sultan stated that Bedirhan Bey’s declarations of loyalty were not credible and that his submission appeared to be motivated by fear of the ongoing military preparations. The implementation of previously determined military measures was therefore to continue.

This imperial order was transmitted by the grand vizierate to the field marshal of Diyarbakır. Meanwhile, the commander of the Anatolian army, Osman Pasha, advanced toward Diyarbakır via Samsun and summoned tribal leaders and Kurdish emirs connected with Bedirhan Bey to Diyarbakır in order to assess his strength and win their support.

According to Osman Pasha, tensions already existed between Bedirhan Bey and several Kurdish emirs, some of whom declared that they would not provide military assistance to him in the event of an Ottoman campaign. The Ottoman government attempted to exploit these divisions by granting titles and gifts to influential Kurdish leaders.

Since the alliance between Bedirhan Bey and Han Mahmud was well known, Ferik Ahmed Pasha was assigned to the Muş region to prevent possible assistance from Han Mahmud. Regular infantry and cavalry units were stationed in the region for this purpose.

In June 1847, Osman Pasha launched military operations against Bedirhan Bey from both the north and south. Ottoman forces subsequently surrounded his stronghold at Orak Castle, bringing heavy artillery from Mosul for the siege. The fortress was bombarded beginning on 27 June 1847.

Unable to resist the siege, Bedirhan Bey surrendered to the Anatolian army on 29 June 1847 in exchange for guarantees regarding his life and property.

== Yezdanşêr Revolt ==
Disappointed by this treatment he led a revolt which began during the Crimean War, maybe in late 1854, which was when his salary was cut. During the Crimean War, the strain on Ottoman military resources created conditions for a major Kurdish rebellion in the region. Yezdanshir Beg, nephew of the former Kurdish ruler Bedirkhan Beg, raised a force and seized Jezira b. Omar in November 1854, killing local Ottoman administrators and extending his control toward Zakho. In January 1855, he denied having rebelled and offered one of his relatives as a hostage. He also put forward several demands towards the Ottomans such as the permission for his family from Mosul to join him in Cizre which should be put under his administration or the release of prisoners in Cizre and Midyat. Not satisfied with the Ottoman response, he conquered Bitlis and raided Midyat. The raid on Midyat was unsuccessful, as after they destroyed the Christian church, the Ottomans came to rescue the town and made many prisoners.

Yezdanshir was known for his openly hostile views toward Yazidis; the American missionary Henry Lobdell recorded hearing him declare that he wished to drink the blood of every Yazidi, Jew, and Christian he encountered. At Redwan, a British vice-consular source reported an eyewitness account of Yezdanshir personally killing between twenty-five and thirty Yazidis, having offered a bounty for live Yazidis to execute. In early 1855, Helmy Pasha organized a force to suppress the rebellion, comprising 2,000 Yazidi horsemen under Mir Hussein Beg of the Sheikhan principality. Hussein Beg, who according to Rassam recognized Yezdanshir as a more dangerous enemy than the Ottoman governor who had recently deposed him, led his forces against the rebels outside Zakho, defeating them and entering the town without resistance, which Hussein Beg formally captured "in the name of His Majesty the Sultan". Following the defeat of Yezdanshir, the sultan received Hussein Beg in audience and awarded him the title of kapi çuhadari, keeper of the official gate.

Officials of the British Empire were worried the Ottomans would deviate troops fighting in the Crimean war to suppress Yezdanşêr's revolt and tried to mend ties between the two parties. The British General Fenwick Williams advised Yezdanşêr not to attack an Army of three states and eventually, the British compelled Yezdanşêr to surrender together with his brother and take refuge in the British Consulate in Mosul. Having arrived in Mosul, the Ottoman officials attempted to apprehend him, which the French prevented. Yezdanşêr and his allies remained in Mosul until September 1855, when they were escorted to Constantinople over Diyarbakir. Without a leader, the revolt dispersed. Arriving in Istanbul, the rebels were arrested and subsequently exiled to Vidin without the knowledge of the British. Lord Stratford, British ambassador in Constantinople protested his exile demanding his return to Constantinople, but to no avail.

== Aftermath ==
The Second Bedirkhanis Revolt was a Kurdish uprising against the Ottoman Empire that took place in 1877–1878, following the Russo-Turkish War of 1877–1878. The revolt was led by two sons of Bedir Khan Beg, Osman Pasha and Huseyin Kenan Pasha.

This was an effort by the two brothers to revive the former Bohtan Emirate.

The revolt was a movement on a much smaller scale than the First Bedirkhanis Revolt. The Russo-Turkish War (1877–1878) created a period of chaos and an authority vacuum in the region.

Osman and Huseyin Kenan Bedirkhan, who were in exile, took advantage of the war environment and the Ottoman state's inability to maintain sufficient soldiers in the region to escape their place of exile and return to Cizre. Huseyin Kenan Pasha had previously participated in the 1877 Russo-Turkish War leading 3,800 Kurdish volunteers from the Adana region, where he was wounded. After recovering, he expressed regret for his service to the Ottoman state.

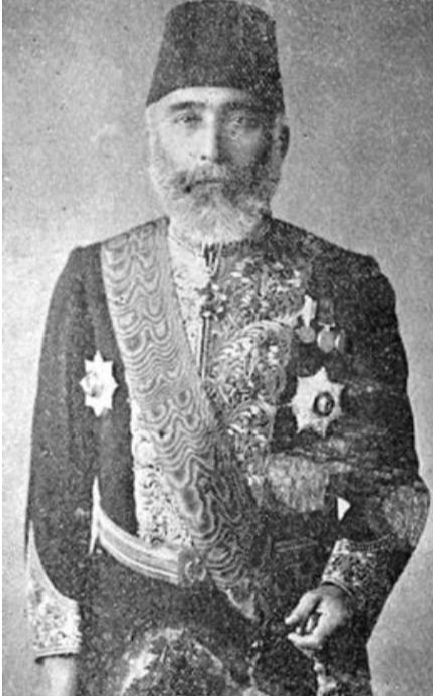
Huseyin Bedir Khan, son of Bedir Khan Beg

Revolt The uprising began in the Cizre and Siirt regions. Huseyin Kenan and Osman, after participating in the 1877 Ottoman-Russian war, went to Botan and attempted to organize an uprising against the central government.

The revolt quickly spread to the hinterland of Lake Van, covering areas such as Van, Muş, Bitlis, Hakkari, and Amedi. Osman Bey commanded Cizre and its vicinity, while Huseyin Kenan Bey managed the northern front. The southern front reportedly extended to Hakkari, Zaxo, Mardin, and Nusaybin.

The Bedirkhanis and the forces they gathered launched attacks against the central government's troops in the Cizre regions. They arrested all Ottoman officials in their vicinity and seized the treasury and arms depots. and a sermon (Khutbah) was read in Osman Bedirkhan's name. The Ottoman state mobilized local military forces, to suppress the revolt.

Support The uprising was supported by several Kurdish tribes. Tribes such as Reşkotan, Motkan, and Silvan supported the revolt. The revolt also received support from the people of Cizre and numerous surrounding Kurdish tribes. Some tribal leaders were already in a state of rebellion and non-recognition of the government. The Hakkari Kurds also supported the revolt.

The rapid spread of the revolt was attributed to the problematic relationship between the central authority and the tribes since the dissolution of the Kurdish emirates. Osman Bedirkhan corresponded with Diyarbakır Governor Abdurrahman Pasha during the revolt, stating that the bonds of the Kurdish tribes with the state were weakened due to the oppression of the governors sent by the state.

The Russian consuls closely monitored and secretly supported the revolt.

The Ottoman Empire was supported by the organized forces of the Syriac-Assyrian leader Hanne Safar of Midyat. For his service, he was later granted the title of Pasha and presented with a sword blessed by the Sultan himself.

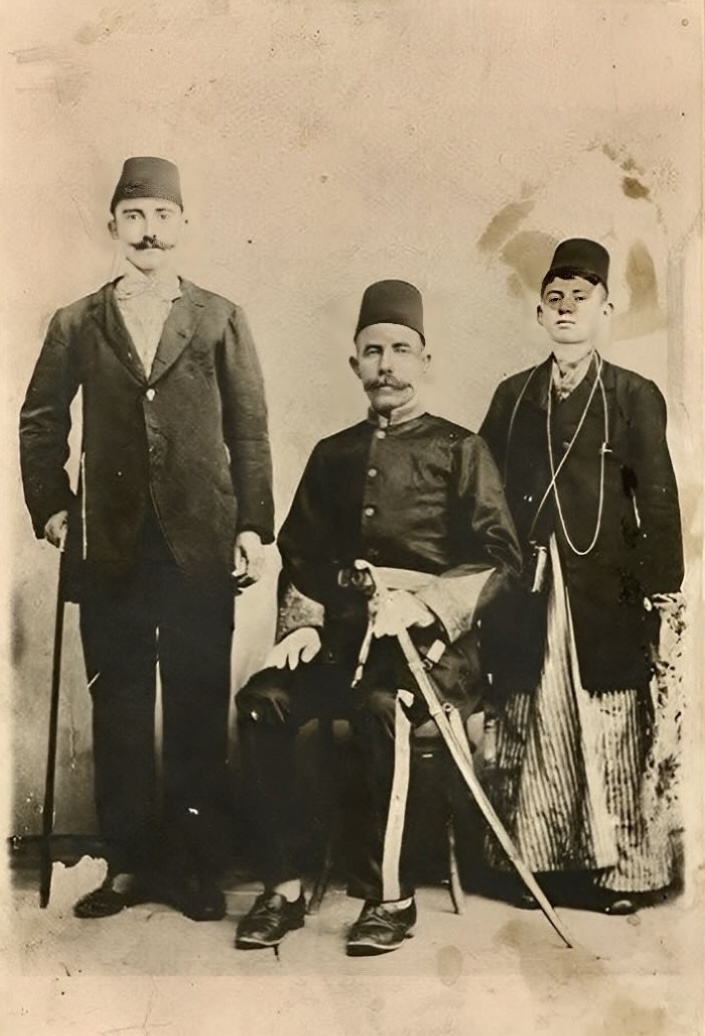
Hanne Safar (Mid)

The revolt was ultimately suppressed by Ottoman military forces. An Ottoman-appointed official, Bedri Bedir Khan (a brother of Huseyin Kenan and Osman), was sent to convince his brothers to surrender and return to Istanbul. Upon their return, Huseyin Kenan and Osman were imprisoned for a short time and then released on the condition that they would not leave Istanbul.

== Sources ==
- Ulugana, Sedat (2022). Kürt-Ermeni Coğrafyasının Sosyopolitik Dönüşümü (1908–1914). İletişim Yayınları. ISBN 978-975-05-3334-1.
- Temel, Celal (2023). İlk ve Orta Kuşak Kürd Önder ve Aydınlar. İsmail Beşikçi Vakfı Yayınları. p. 81. ISBN 9786059073714.
- Guest, John S. (2023-01-27). The Yezidis: A Study in Survival. Taylor & Francis. ISBN 978-1-000-81750-8.
