= Second Bedirkhanis Revolt =

Kurdish uprising against the Ottoman Empire in 1877–1878

- Part of Early Kurdish nationalism and Russo-Turkish War (1877–1878)
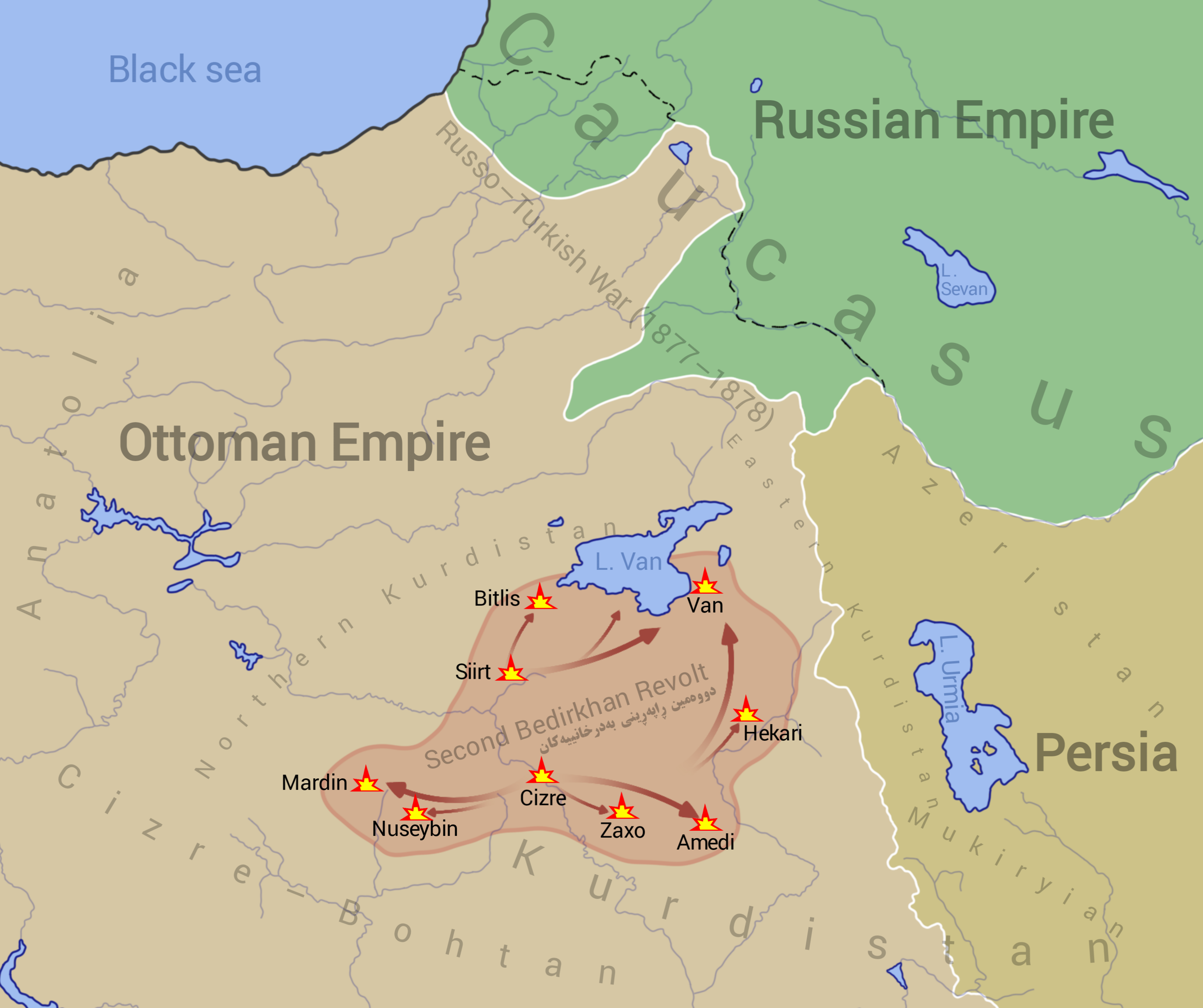
- Map of the affected areas of the Bedirkhan Revolt
Date	1877–1878
Location	Cizre, Siirt, Bitlis, Van, Hakkari, Mardin, Nusaybin, Zaxo, Amedi, Bohtan, (Ottoman Kurdistan)
Result	Revolt suppressed

Belligerents
Kurdish forces; Bedirkhan family; Kurdish tribes; Reşkotan; Motkan Supported by: Russian Empire	Ottoman Empire; Assyrian troops

Commanders and leaders
Osman Pasha Bedirkhan; Huseyin Kenan Bedirkhan	(Ottoman Empire) Abdul Hamid II (Ottoman Empire) Cemil Pasha (Ottoman Empire) General Shevket Beg (Ottoman Empire) Mushir Zeki Pasha; Hanne Safar

The Second Bedirkhanis Revolt (Kurdish: دووەمین یاپەچوونی بێده‌رخانی) was a Kurdish uprising against the Ottoman Empire that took place in 1877–1878, following the Russo-Turkish War of 1877–1878. The revolt was led by two sons of Bedir Khan Beg, Osman Pasha and Huseyin Kenan Pasha.

This was an effort by the two brothers to revive the former Bohtan Emirate.

== Background ==
The revolt was a movement on a much smaller scale than the 1847 Bedirkhan revolt. The Russo-Turkish War (1877–1878) created a period of chaos and an authority vacuum in the region.

Osman and Huseyin Kenan Bedirkhan, who were in exile, took advantage of the war environment and the Ottoman state's inability to maintain sufficient soldiers in the region to escape their place of exile and return to Cizre. Huseyin Kenan Pasha had previously participated in the 1877 Russo-Turkish War leading 3,800 Kurdish volunteers from the Adana region, where he was wounded. After recovering, he expressed regret for his service to the Ottoman state.

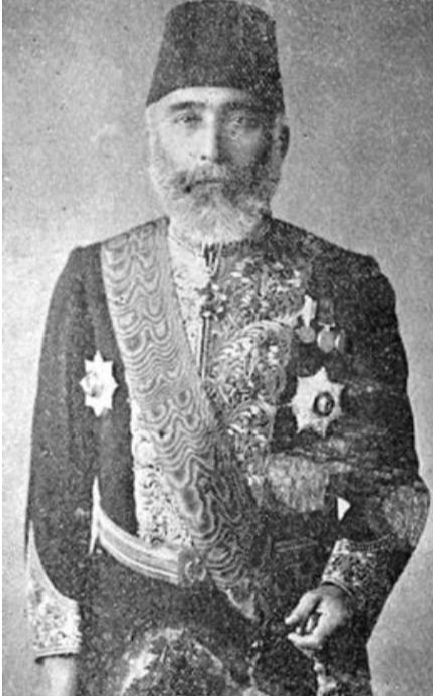
Huseyin Bedir Khan, son of Bedir Khan Beg

== Revolt ==
The uprising began in the Cizre and Siirt regions. Huseyin Kenan and Osman, after participating in the 1877 Ottoman-Russian war, went to Botan and attempted to organize an uprising against the central government.

The revolt quickly spread to the hinterland of Lake Van, covering areas such as Van, Muş, Bitlis, Hakkari, and Amedi. Osman Bey commanded Cizre and its vicinity, while Huseyin Kenan Bey managed the northern front. The southern front reportedly extended to Hakkari, Zaxo, Mardin, and Nusaybin.

The Bedirkhanis and the forces they gathered launched attacks against the central government's troops in the Cizre regions. They arrested all Ottoman officials in their vicinity and seized the treasury and arms depots. and a sermon (Khutbah) was read in Osman Bedirkhan's name. The Ottoman state mobilized local military forces, to suppress the revolt.

=== Support ===
The uprising was supported by several Kurdish tribes. Tribes such as Reşkotan and Motkan around Siirt and Bitlis supported the revolt. The revolt also received support from the people of Cizre and numerous surrounding Kurdish tribes. Some tribal leaders were already in a state of rebellion and non-recognition of the government. The Hakkari Kurds also supported the revolt.

The rapid spread of the revolt was attributed to the problematic relationship between the central authority and the tribes since the dissolution of the Kurdish emirates. Osman Bedirkhan corresponded with Diyarbakır Governor Abdurrahman Pasha during the revolt, stating that the bonds of the Kurdish tribes with the state were weakened due to the oppression of the governors sent by the state.

The Russian consuls closely monitored and secretly supported the revolt.

The Ottoman Empire was supported by the organized forces of the Syriac-Assyrian leader Hanne Safar of Midyat. For his service, he was later granted the title of Pasha and presented with a sword blessed by the Sultan himself.

== Aftermath ==
The revolt was ultimately suppressed by Ottoman military forces. An Ottoman-appointed official, Bedri Bedir Khan (a brother of Huseyin Kenan and Osman), was sent to convince his brothers to surrender and return to Istanbul. Upon their return, Huseyin Kenan and Osman were imprisoned for a short time and then released on the condition that they would not leave Istanbul.

== Sources ==
- Ulugana, Sedat (2022). Kürt-Ermeni Coğrafyasının Sosyopolitik Dönüşümü (1908–1914). İletişim Yayınları. ISBN 978-975-05-3334-1.
- Temel, Celal (2023). İlk ve Orta Kuşak Kürd Önder ve Aydınlar. İsmail Beşikçi Vakfı Yayınları. p. 81. ISBN 9786059073714.
