= Ottoman Kurds =

Ethnic Kurds living within the Ottoman Empire

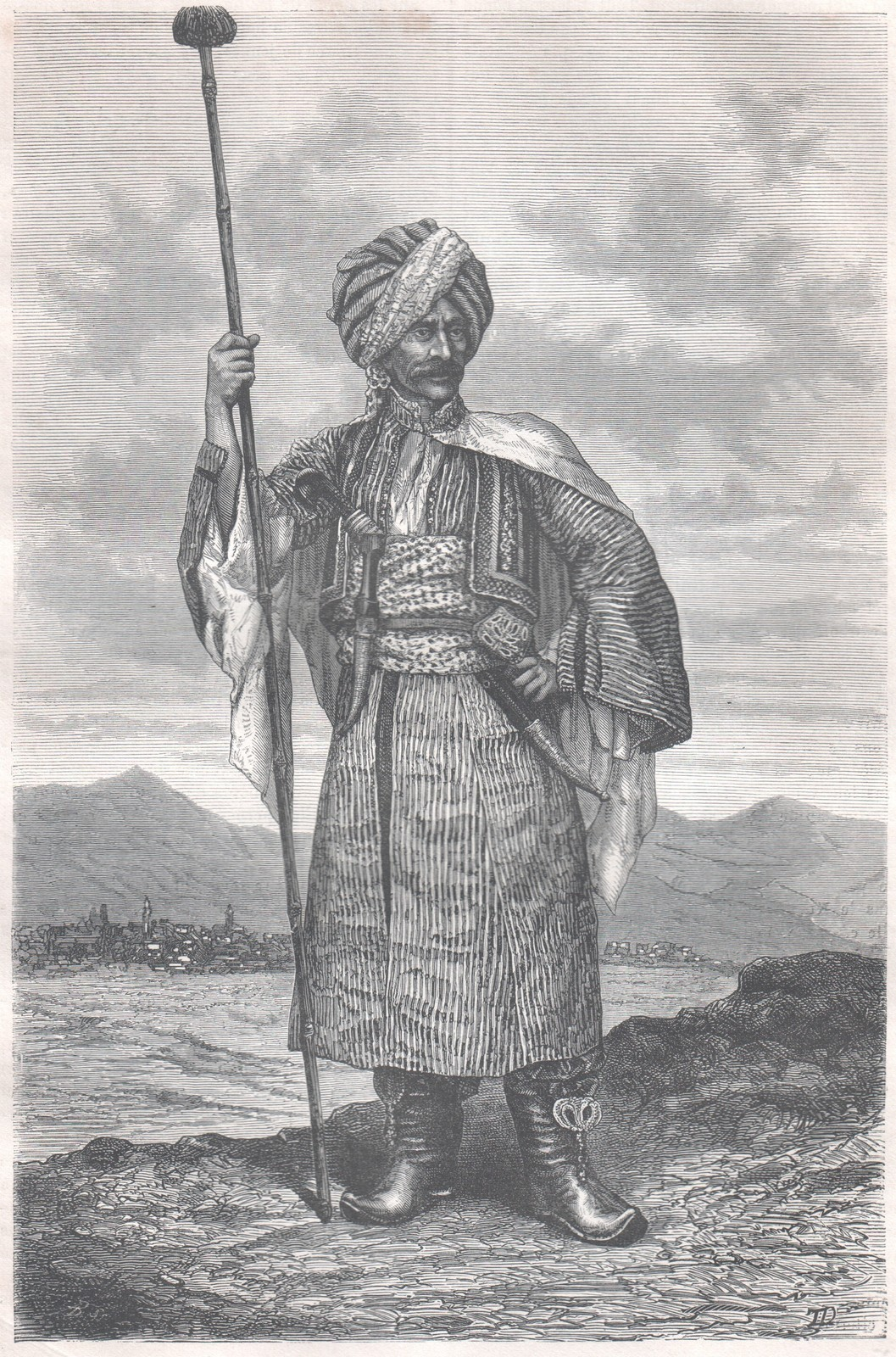
- A drawing of a Kurdish prince in the Ottoman Empire in an Italian book called Giro Mondo

Total population
- Over 500,000 families (1880)

Regions with significant populations
- Ottoman Kurdistan

Languages
- Kurdish

Religion
- Predominantly: Shafi'i school of Sunni Islam; Minority: Yazidism, Alevism, Twelver Shi'ism, Hanafism

Related ethnic groups
- Modern Kurds and other Iranian peoples

Ottoman Kurds were ethnic Kurds who lived in the Ottoman Empire. At its peak, the Ottoman Empire ruled North Kurdistan, South Kurdistan, West Kurdistan, and a small part of East Kurdistan. Parts of Greater Kurdistan under Ottoman control are collectively known as Ottoman Kurdistan.

== History ==
The Ottomans first made contact with Kurds during their conflict with the Safavids in 1514, under the rule of Selim I. Their first interactions were positive. The Kurds, led by Idris Bitlisi, sided with the Ottoman invaders against the Safavids during the Battle of Chaldiran. The Kurdish forces played a big role in taking Diyarbakır and other parts of Eastern Anatolia from the Safavids. In the Ottoman Empire, Kurds were known as the "Black Nation" while Turkomans were known as the "Grey Nation". After the Ottomans gained control of Eastern Anatolia, Sultan Selim I rewarded the Kurds with tax and military exemptions when needed, as well as semi-autonomous status, which was protected and recognized by the Ottomans. The autonomous system was ruled by Kurdish tribes, and passed down from father to son. The autonomous system lasted from 1514 until the mid-1800s. In the mid-1800s, Ottoman and Kurdish relations began to deteriorate. However, until the 1900s, the majority of Kurds remained loyal to the Ottoman Empire. Around 1829–1830, after the 1828–29 war with the Russians, the Ottoman Empire's relations with its Kurdish population turned tense. Mahmud II's reforms were so strong they paved way for the ideology of the Turkish National Movement. Mahmud II further centralised the Ottoman Empire, which weakened the autonomous Kurdish rule and interfered with the Kurdish tribal system. Kurdish tribes resisted the reforms, which would escalate to the point that Mahmud II ordered Reşid Mehmed Pasha, the governor of Sivas district, to defeat the resistance. Resid Mehmed Pasha's army was much more modern than the Kurdish tribes, who still used Janissary equipment and methods. The rebellions were crushed. Later in 1834, the Ottomans feared a cooperation between the Soran Emirate and Muhammad Ali Pasha, leading them to dispatch an army to Soran in 1834, which was repelled by Mir Kor. Kurdish notables from Bradost, Akre and Amedi later complained to Reşid Mehmed Pasha of the Ottoman government that they were being oppressed by Mir Kor. Two years later, the Ottomans ousted Mir Kor.

=== Post-Tanzimat ===
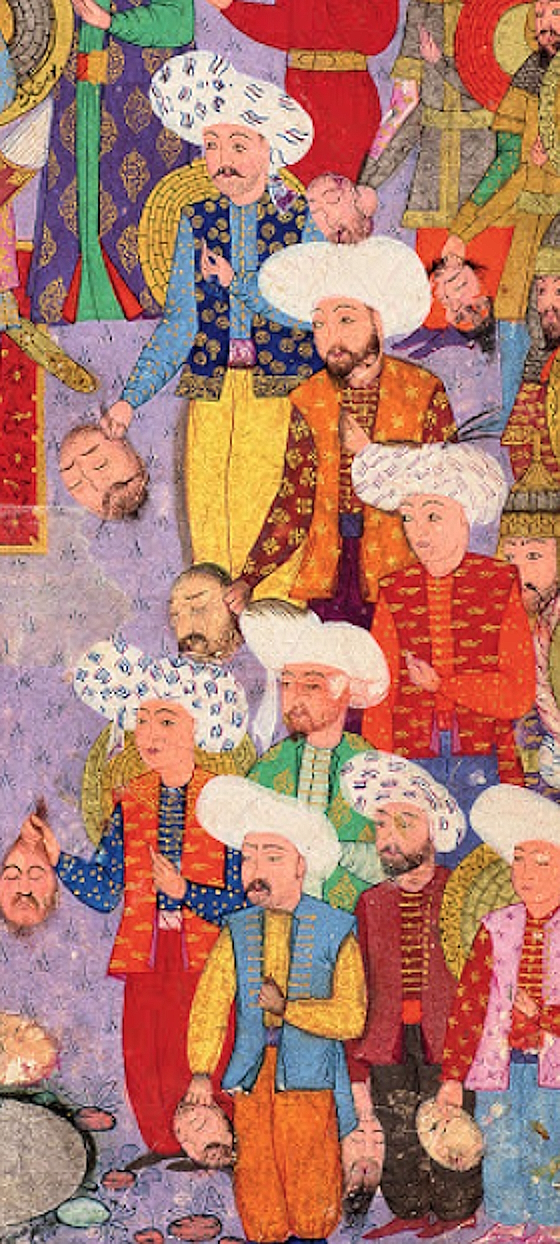
Ottoman Kurds visiting Lala Mustafa Pasha, in 1581, holding the heads of Safavid Qizilbash warriors. Nusretname

After the Tanzimat, which were the strongest Ottoman reforms, Bedir Khan Beg, a former Ottoman ally who had sided with the Ottomans during the Battle of Nezib, later rebelled to restore his autonomy and to fight against the increasing demand of centralization. He would declare independence in 1847. Bedir Khan Beg harshly Islamized and persecuted Yazidis and Assyrians. The increasing persecution of Christians led to European powers pressuring the Ottomans to stop Bedir Khan Beg. In 1847, the 12,000 Ottoman troops led by Omar Pasha invaded Bohtan. The Yazidis and the Assyrians, seeking revenge, allied with the Ottomans against Bedir Khan Beg, who was initially winning the conflict but lost after one of his top commanders deserted to the Ottoman Empire. Bedir Khan Beg surrendered on 4 July 1847 in Eruh.

The Kurdistan Eyalet was a province in the Ottoman Empire which lasted about 21 years, between 1846 and 1867.

After the defeat of Bedir Khan Beg, the majority of Ottoman Kurdish lands were under control of the central government. In 1876, Abdul Hamid II rose to power. Under Abdulhamid II, Ottoman and Kurdish relations improved for a time. Abdulhamid II took more of a Pan-Islamist thinking rather than an Ottomanist one. This would allow many Sheikhs to rise in Kurdistan, most notably Sheikh Ubeydullah, who was dealing with a conflict with Qajar Iran at the time. Sheikh Ubeydullah sent a small number of his soldiers to help the Ottoman Army in the 1877–1878 Ottoman-Russian War. In summer 1879, rumours spread that Sheikh Ubeydullah had promised some Kurdish tribal chiefs that he would "sweep all the Christians from the land". A year later, in 1880, it was reported that Sheikh Ubeydullah was told "that the Armenians are going to have an independent state in Van, and that the Nestorians (Assyrians) are going to hoist the British flag and declare themselves British subjects". Sheikh Ubeydullah replied by saying that he would never permit that even if he had to "arm the women". In a letter to Sultan Abdülhamid II, Sheikh Ubeydullah declared that the Muslims would not allow the formation of an "Armenian state" and said that the power of the Caliph had been severely worsened by the Tanizmat. According to Sheikh Ubeydullah, the Kurds in the Ottoman Empire numbered over 500,000 families. The aftermath of the war with Russians took a massive toll on the Ottoman Empire, specifically the Eastern regions, where the Kurds, as well as some Turkmens lived. As a result of the famine, many Kurds turned to Sheikh Ubeydullah, a wealthy Islamic alim, for help. He prepared to revolt against the Ottomans due to their bad response for fighting the famine. Sheikh Ubeydullah eventually revolted and fought against the Russian Empire, Ottomans, and Qajar Iran at the same time. He lost to the Ottomans and was taken to Istanbul, but he later fled back to his hometown of Şemdinli to organize another revolt; he was once again captured and was exiled to Hejaz, where he lived until his death.

Abdulhamid II tried to keep a pro-Kurdish policy. He was loved by Kurds to the point that he was nicknamed "Bavê Kurdan", meaning "father of the Kurds". Abdulhamid II formed the Hamidiye cavalry in 1890. Kurds would become the majority of the soldiers in the Hamidiye cavalry. The Hamidiye cavalry harassed Armenians living in the eastern Ottoman Empire and massacred them during the Hamidian massacres. The Hamidiye cavalry also massacred Assyrian people during the Diyarbakır massacres in 1895.

Around 1908, Turkish nationalism, which was secular, made its way to the Ottoman Empire and challenged the Pan-Islamist policies of Abdulhamid II. The July 1908 Young Turk Revolution by the nationalist Young Turks and the CUP forced Abdulhamid II to restore the Ottoman Parliament and Ottoman Constitution, which ended the absolute rule of Abdulhamid II over the fracturing Ottoman Empire. Abdulhamid II's pro-Kurdish policy was part of his Pan-Islamist agenda. Pan-Islamism aims to unite all Muslims, which includes Kurds, who are mostly Sunni Muslims. Abdulhamid II was the last Ottoman Sultan to rule with absolute power, and his reign ended on 27 April 1909.

In 1915, some Kurdish tribes helped the CUP during the Armenian genocide. It was around this time when Kurds became divided, with some opposing the CUP's actions and some supporting it.

In February 1915, Simko Shikak organized a massacre of Armenians and Assyrians in Haftevan, assisted by the Ottoman Army. Around 700–800 Armenians and Assyrians were killed.

In 1916, three years after the 1913 Ottoman coup d'état, the deportations of Kurds began. Talaat Pasha, referring to the deportations, stated: "to preclude that the Kurdish refugees continue their tribal life and their nationality wherever they have been deported, the chieftains need to be separated from the common people by all means, and all influential personalities and leaders need to be sent separately to the provinces of Konya and Kastamonu, and to the districts of Niğde and Kayseri. The sick, the elderly, lonely and poor women and children who are unable to travel will be settled and supported in Maden town and Ergani and Behremaz counties, to be dispersed in Turkish villages and among Turks."

Kurds, being a nomadic people, were forcefully sedentarized and made to settle after these deportations. Kurds from Diyarbakir were sent to other places while migrants from the Balkans were settled there the government. Kurds needed permission to return to Diyarbakir.

Also in 1916, the Russian Empire, with help from Assyrians and Armenians, massacred around 8,000 Kurds in Rawandiz.

In 1916, around 300,000 Kurds from Bitlis, Erzurum, Palu and Muş were sent to Konya and Gaziantep during the winter; most of them died in a famine.

Even after the dissolution of the Ottoman Empire and the creation of Turkey, the deportations continued under Mustafa Kemal Atatürk.

Also in 1916, the Arab Revolt took place, which was a big part in the fall of the Ottomans.

After the dissolution of the Ottoman Empire and the division of the former Ottoman Empire by European Powers, the Kurds became divided among the newly created Turkey, French Syria and British Iraq. The Kingdom of Kurdistan, a small kingdom led by Mahmud Barzanji was against the British-drawn borders. The Kingdom of Kurdistan lasted from 1921 to 1925, when it was absorbed into the rest of British Iraq.

== Some notable Ottoman Kurds ==
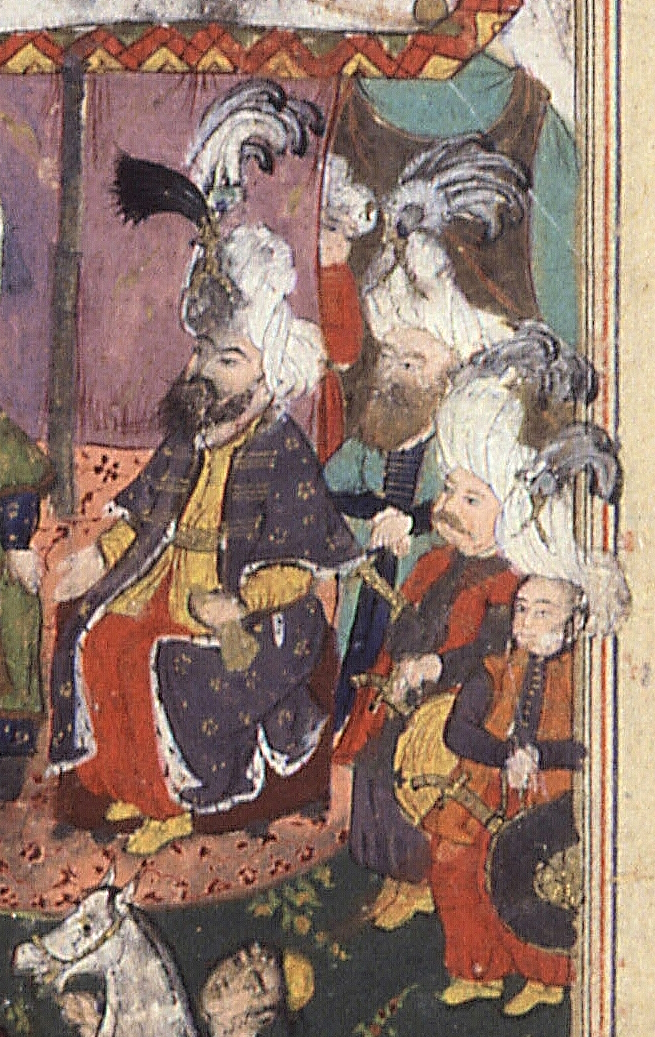
Eyewitness depiction of Kurdish prince Mir Sheref and his retinue in Jizra in 1602-03 (BNF, Turc 127).

- Idris Bitlisi (1457–1520), Ottoman-Kurdish religious scholar and administrator.
- Sharafkhan Bidlisi (1543–1604), Ottoman-Kurdish Emir of Bitlis
- Mir Sheref (c.1500-after 1602), ruler of Jizra region
- Fakî-yi Tayran (1590–1660), Poet
- Canbolatoğlu Ali Paşa (Died 1610), Ottoman Governor of Aleppo and Temeşvar
- Ahmed-i Hânî (1650–1707), Intellectual, scholar, mystic and poet
- Ibrahim Deli Pasha (unknown), was an Ottoman Kurd who served as the governor of Damascus in 1788.
- Mahmud Bayazidi (1797–1859), Ottoman-Kurdish philosopher and polymath
- Bedir Khan Beg (1803–1869), Mir and mütesellim of the Emirate of Botan under the Ottoman Empire
- Kunj Yusuf Pasha (unknown), Ottoman Governor of Damascus (1807–1810)
- Shamdin Agha (Died 1860), Ottoman-Kurdish commander of irregulars in the service
- Mustafa Zihni Pasha (1838–1911), Minister of Commerce and Public Works, Member of the Senate of the Ottoman Empire, Vali (governor) of the provinces of Hejaz, Ioannina, Adana and Aleppo
- Kurd Said Pasha (1834–1907), Ottoman Minister of Foreign Affairs
- Ibrahim Pasha Milli (1843–1908), Ottoman-Kurdish ofiicer in Hamidiye regiments.
- Bedri Pasha Bedir Khan (1848–1911), Ottoman-Kurdish politician
- Kurd Ahmet Izzet Pasha (1871–1920), Ottoman Governor of Van, Minister of Evkaf and Interim Minister of the Interior
- Abdürrezzak Bedir Khan (1864–1918), Ottoman diplomat, politician
- Şerif Pasha (1865–1951), Ottoman Ambassador to Stockholm
- Kurd Fuad Pasha, the head of the Ottoman Military College and the Ottoman court of military appeals.
- Emin Ali Bedir Khan (1851–1926), Founding member of the Kurdish Society for Cooperation and Progress
- Mustafa Yamulki (1866–1936), Ottoman-Kurdish chairman of the Ottoman military court
- İshak Sükuti (1868–1902), Ottoman-Kurdish writer and medical Doctor
- Abdullah Cevdet (1869–1932), Ottoman-Kurdish intellectual and physician
- Aziz Feyzi Pirinççizâde (1878–1933), A member of the Ottoman Parliament for Diyarbakir.
- Mevlanzade Rifat Bey (1869–1930), Journalist and poet
- Abdul Aziz Yamulki (1890–1981), Ottoman General
- Ekrem Cemilpaşa (1891–1973), Ottoman-Kurdish politician and officer
- Celadet Alî Bedirxan (1893–1951), Ottoman-Kurdish diplomat, writer, linguist, journalist and political activist
- Mustafa Pasha Bajalan (Died 1921), Ottoman-Kurdish hereditary governor of the Pashlik of Zohab.
- Halid Beg Cibran (1882–1925), was an Ottoman - Kurdish soldier in the Ottoman Army and chairman of the Azadî organization.
- Diyap Yıldırım (1852–1932), Politician for the Republican People's Party (CHP), and an Alevi religious and tribal leader of Kurdish-Zaza origin.
- Hasan Hayri (1881–1925), Ottoman Kurdish military officer and politician of the Meclis-i Mebusan. In 1920, Later in Turkish Grand National Assembly
- Nuri Dersimi (1852–1932), writer, revolutionary and intellectual.
- Hapsa Khan (1891–1953), An early Kurdish feminist and nationalist leader
- Leyla Bedir Khan (1903–1986), Ottoman-Kurdish ballet dancer

== Gallery ==
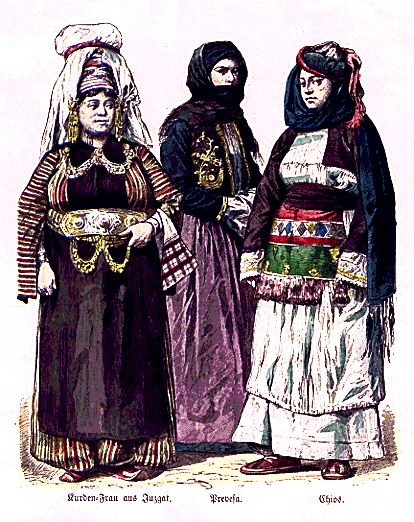
On the left is a Kurdish woman from Yozgat, 1880. (Kurden-Frau aus Juzgat)

Ottoman Turkish officer surrounded by Ottoman Kurdish infantry.

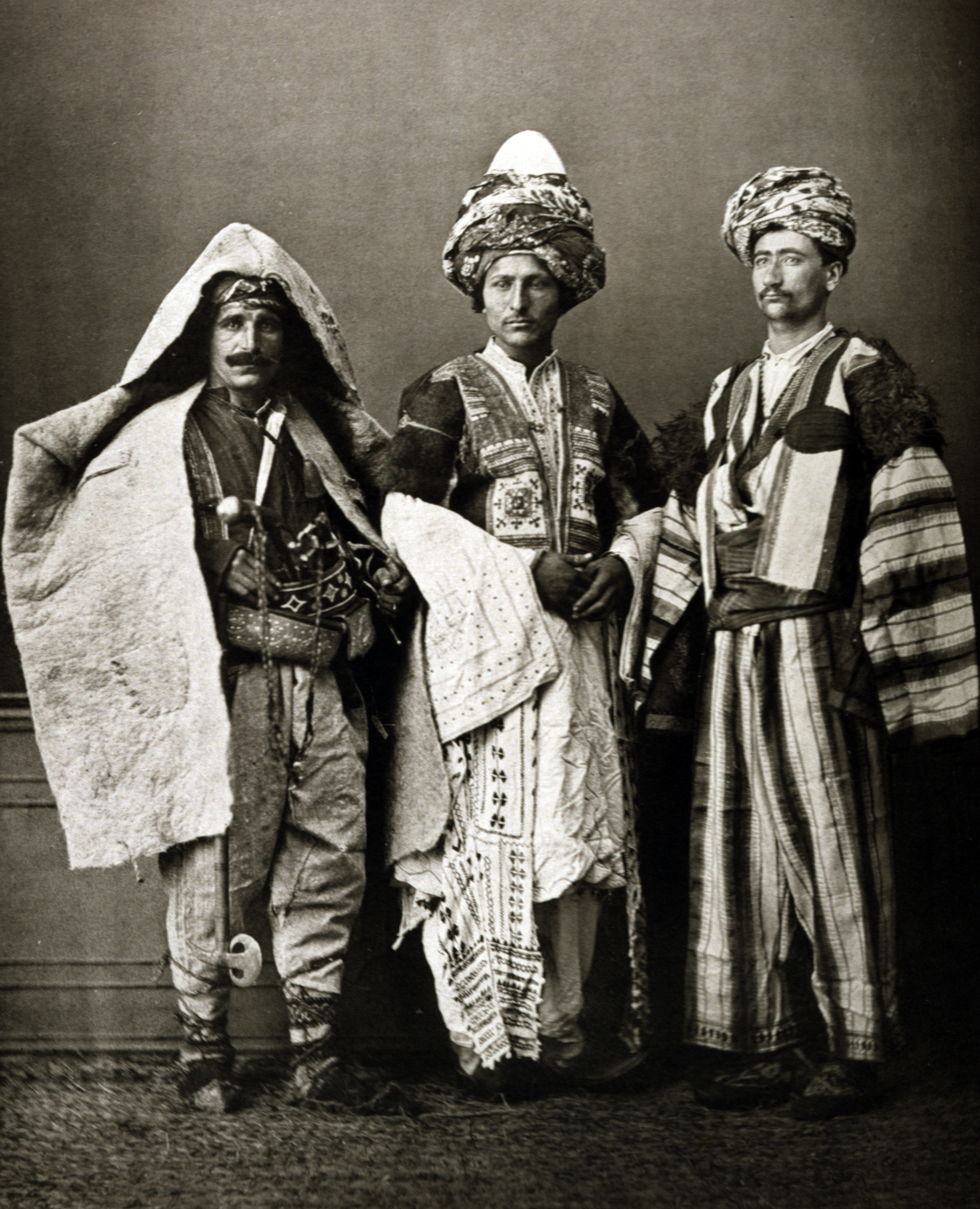
Left to right: Kurd from Diyarbakir, Kurd from Mardin, and a Kurd from Jazira in 1873, Ottoman Empire.

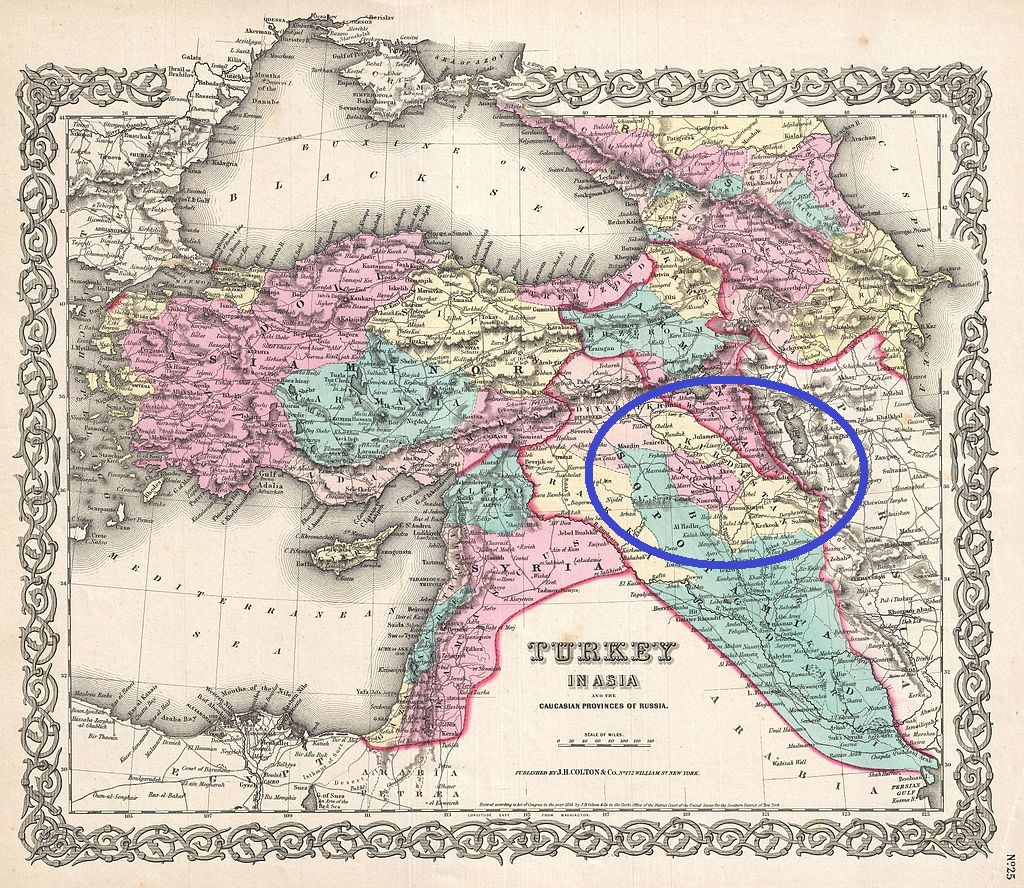
Ottoman Kurdistan in 1855.

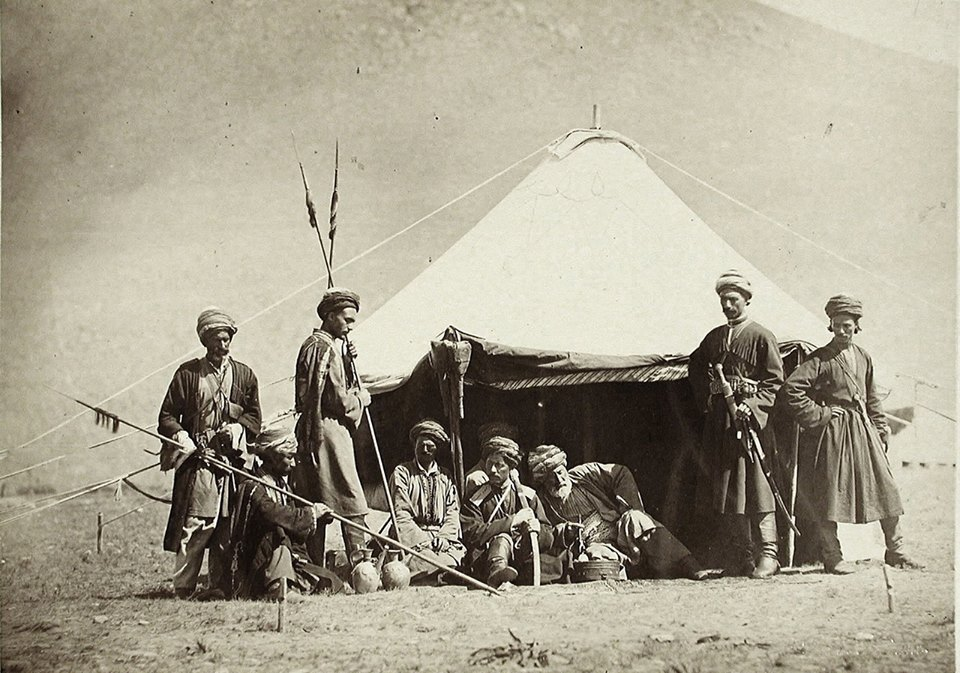
Kurdish soldiers of the Ottoman Empire in the Caucasus in 1877.

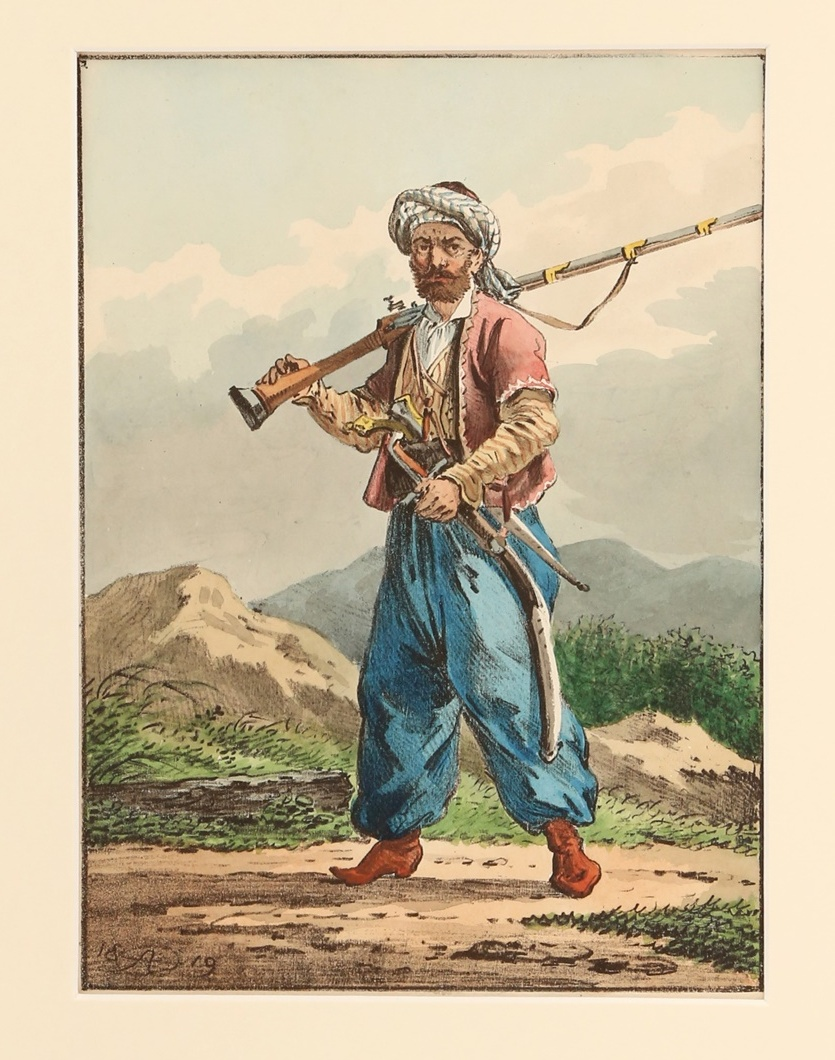
Kurdish fighter from Hakkari, 1819.

== See also ==
- Kurdish emirates
- Ottoman Greeks
- Ottoman Turks
- Ottoman Armenians
- History of the Jews in the Ottoman Empire
