= Bedir Khan =

Bedir Khan (Bedirxan) is a surname. Notable people with the surname include:

- Bedir Khan Beg
- Emin Ali Bedir Khan
- Bedri Pasha Bedir Khan, Kurdish Ottoman politician
- Abdürrezzak Bedir Khan
- Leyla Bedir Khan
- Celadet Alî Bedirxan
- Kamuran Alî Bedirxan
- Süreyya Bedir Khan
- Wiam Simav Bedirxan
