= Mustafa Pasha Bajalan =

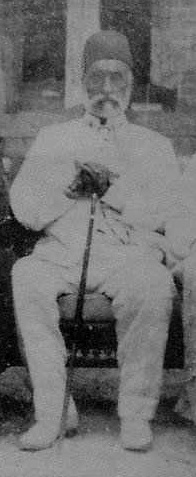
Mustafa Pasha Bajalan

Mustafa Pasha Bajalan (Turkish: Mustafa Paşa Bacalan; 1921–?), was an Ottoman Kurdish general and administrator, He was the final head of the Bajalan family and his father was the last hereditary governor of the Pashlik of Zohab.

== History ==
Mustafa was the son of Osman Pasha Bajalan. He never succeeded his father as hereditary governor of Zohab because the Persians conquered the Pashlik annexed it to Kermanshah.

Mustafa's father Osman Pasha Bajalan after being overthrown in Zohab moved to Constantinople and then Mosul where Mustafa was born where after his education he entered the Ottoman civil service and took up the post of kaymakam of Al 'Aziziyah then Badrah and finally Khanaqin where his tribe still enjoyed influence because of its proximity to his ancestors former Pashlik and the number of Bajalan tribesmen who had followed their chief and settled in the town from across the Persian frontier.

Mustafa was still head of the Bajalan tribe at turn of the 20th century but the family and tribe had been in decline with the loss of hereditary rule.

Mustafa was described by civil administration of Mesopotamia as one of the most important political factors in the region.

Ely Banister Soane a British political officer describes him a man with a harsh and determined character, he also notes that Mustafa was a Kurd to the backbone and was of pure descent, Soane also comments that 'Mustafa has a great reputation for dashing bravery in tribal fighting' and that he would be 'an energetic and enthusiastic instrument in any scheme for the autonomy of Kurdistan. It is also documented that Mustafa Pasha Bajlan was always anti-Turk and was at various times been in rebellion.

The Ottoman government and Mustafa had been in constant friction with each other and as a result he had spent many years in exile in Constantinople. In total he was kept practically a prisoner by Abdul Hamed for 13 years, first in Constantinople and then in Baghdad.

His contact and relationships with British officials alarmed the Turks and Arabs to the extent that he was called to Baghdad and placed under house arrest in 1912.

Gertrude Bell describes Mustafa as being a Kurdish chief of high repute and notes "Did I ever tell you that Mustapha Pasha Bajlan (to whom you gave a silver pencil) died while I was in Cairo a heart attack. It's a great loss; he was a staunch supporter at Khaniqin [Khanaqin] and a very old friend of mine. I had a great affection for him. His wife has written me several letters - she is a delightful woman. Some time I must get up to Khaniqin to see her."

His tribe the Bajlan note the British, are half on the Turkish side and half Persian side of the frontier, he must be taken into account, the Turkish sections being under the influence of Mustafa Pasha, of Khaniqin, who is the most important political factor in that district.

The autumn of 1917 allowed, finally, the installation of a British Political Officer at Khaniqin, after nine months of heart-rending petitions from Mustafa Pasha Bajlan and every class in the ruined countryside.

Mustafa had a harem in which his two wives lived, one of which was Asma Khanum, the daughter of the last Baban prince Ahmed Pasha.
