= Khan Mahmud =

Mir of Miks by 1843 until 1866

Khan Mahmud was a 19th-century Kurdish lord. He was born in Müküs (now Van), and after his father Abdi Beg's death, he became Mir of the Kurdish Emirate of Miks.

In 1843 and 1846 he fought within an alliance with Bedir Khan Beg from Cizre and Nurullah Beg from Hakkari against the Christian Nestorians. The massacres caused by the alliance raised concerns around the foreign Christian missionaries and later were harshly criticized by diplomats from Europe and the United States. The Ottomans then tried to compel the alliance to surrender but the Ottomans were not persuasive enough. The Ottomans then fought the Kurdish alliance and Khan Mahmoud lost his post in 1846 and was exiled to Rousse (now a Bulgarian city). Khan Mahmud died in Rousse in 1866.
