= Leyla Bedir Khan =

Kurdish dancer

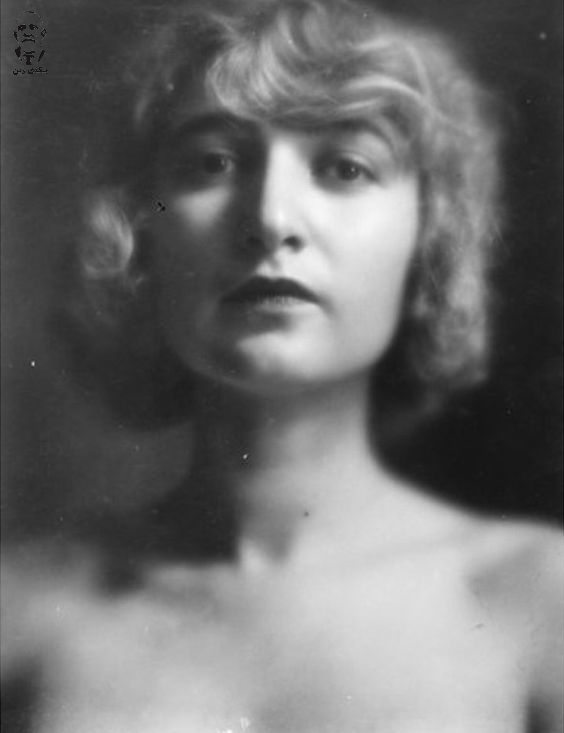
- Born: 1903; Constantinople, Ottoman Empire
- Died: 1986 (aged 82–83); Paris, France
- Known for: Ballet dancer
- Spouse: Henri Touache (m. 1930)
- Children: Nevin
- Parents: Abdürrezzak Bedir Khan (father); Henriette Ornik (mother)
- Family: Azizan dynasty

Leyla Bedir Khan (or Bedirxan) (1903, Constantinople – 1986, Paris) was a ballet dancer and a Kurdish princess of the Bedir Khan family.

== Biography ==
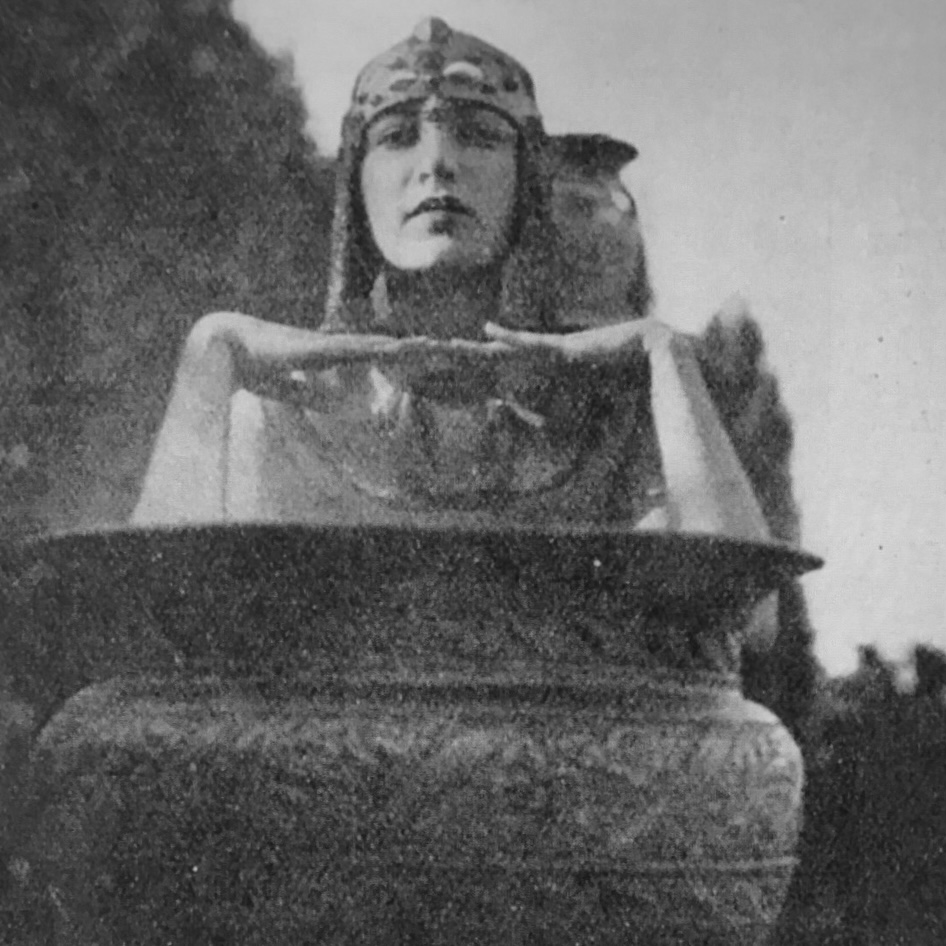
Leyla Bedir Khan in Sweden, 1928

Leyla Bedir Khan's birthdate is disputed, but it was likely 31 July 1903 as she was born in Constantinople. Leyla herself said, she was born in 1908, but her father was in prison in Libya between 1906 and 1910. She was born into a noble household to Abdürrezzak Bedir Khan, a descendant of Bedir Khan Beg and Henriette Ornik, a dentist of Austrian-Jewish origin. Her first years she passed in the Ottoman Empire, but her family soon settled in Kingdom of Egypt, where she grew up with the diplomatic society in Cairo and Alexandria. After her father's death, she and her mother went to live in Vienna, where Leyla took her first dancing lessons. To complete her secondary education, she attended a school in Montreux, Switzerland. She started a dancing career afterwards and by 1924 she starred at the Concert Hall in Vienna. Leyla left for France to pursue her career. While staying in Paris, she studied dances of the Indian and Persian cultures as well as of the Zoroastrian rites for a year. She performed at opera houses in Europe and the United States. She was the first Kurdish ballet dancer to appear at the opera house La Scala in Milan in 1932 and performed in the New York Worlds Fair of 1939. Regarding her choreography for oriental dance performances, it was reported that she said she didn't actually learn the dances she performed; she improvised, using mostly her arms and body rather than her legs. She was able to include dances from the different cultures through which she went through in life, such as Egyptian and Assyrian dances, into her repertoire. During her career, she was often announced as a Kurdish princess or a Kurdish star., after World War II, she decided to end her career as a performing dancer and opened a dancing school in Paris. The French painter Jean Target depicted her dancing and the Mesopotamia Dance Company staged the piece Leyla in her memory in 2015.

== Personal life ==
Leyla Bedir Khan and Henri Touache married in 1930. The couple became parents to a daughter, named Nevin. Leyla died in Paris in 1986 and was buried in the cemetery of Saint-Cloud.
