= Ottoman Kurdistan =

Areas of Kurdistan in the Ottoman Empire

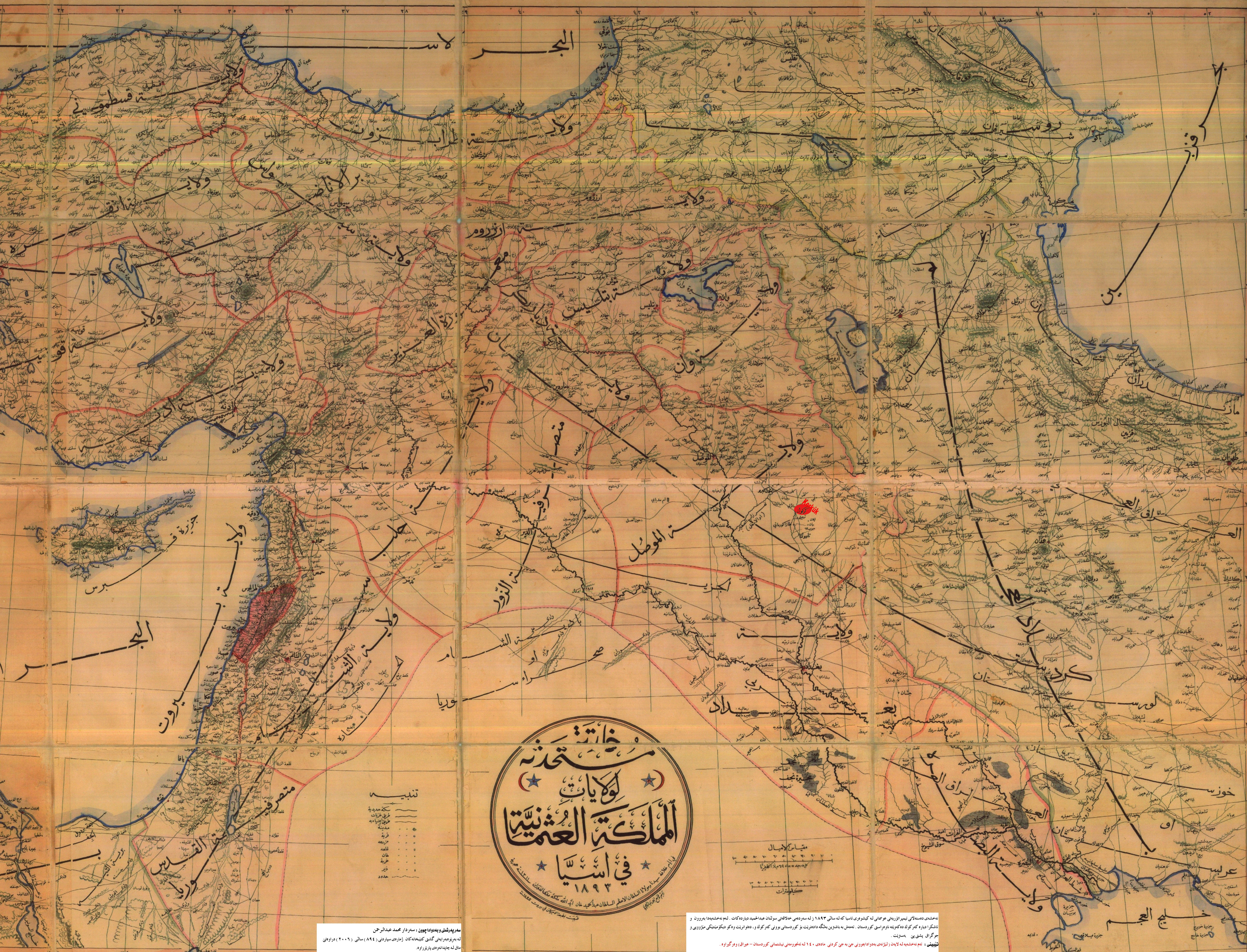
An Ottoman map printed in 1893, during the reign of Abdul Hamid II, showing the lands of the empire. On the map, "کردستان" (Kurdistan) correlates with the region inhabited by Kurds.

Ottoman Kurdistan were areas of Kurdistan controlled by the Ottoman Empire. At the peak of the Ottoman Empire, it controlled all of modern-day Turkish Kurdistan, Iraqi Kurdistan, and Syrian Kurdistan, as well as a small part of Iranian Kurdistan. The remainder of Iranian Kurdistan was known as Safavid Kurdistan and was ruled by the Safavid Empire. The Ottomans saw Kurdistan as an official region comprising settlements inhabited by Kurds, and included it many maps, although it was largely not an administrative division.

== History ==
=== Pre-Ottoman era ===
Most of Ottoman Kurdistan was previously controlled by the Safavids. The Kurds were an oppressed minority in the Safavid Empire and had a long conflict with them. Unlike Persians and Azerbaijanis, the Kurds viewed firearms as cowardly and often only used swords. Much of the Kurdish population in the Safavid Empire that lived near the Ottoman borders was forcefully deported to other parts of Iran or killed. As the Ottomans advanced deeper into the Safavid regions, the Kurdish regions were subjected to terrible plunder and deportation due to the fear of Kurdish cooperation with the Ottomans. They began under Tahmasp I. Between 1534 and 1535, Tahmasp began the systematic destruction of old Kurdish cities and their countryside, using it against his Ottoman rivals. Tahmasp ordered the destruction of crops and settlements of all sizes while withdrawing from the Ottoman army. The Safavid and Kurdish conflicts continued until the Kurds under Idris Bitlisi managed to help the Ottomans during the Battle of Chaldiran.

=== Ottoman era ===
In 1514, during the Battle of Chaldiran, the Kurds collaborated with the Ottoman invaders against the Safavids. The Ottomans won the battle and annexed the Kurdish-majority regions of Eastern Anatolia and Northern Iraq into their empire, and those regions were considered Ottoman Kurdistan.

Kurdistan was cherished as a barrier protecting the Ottoman Empire from the Safavids, with Murad IV saying "Allah created Kurdistan to protect my empire like a strong barrier and an iron castle against the mischief of evil Iran. Kurdish commanders are loyal and true friends of the Ottoman state, and they have given various services that are commendable to the throne from the supreme times of our great ancestors, and they have made incalculable efforts; therefore, the effort to protect the empire requires them to be treated with respect and care."

From the 16th to the 19th centuries, various small autonomous Kurdish emirates formed within Ottoman Kurdistan. Kurdish emirates were tribal and almost always had rivalries with emirates led by other tribes. Most Kurdish emirates were established and dissolved in the areas of the Diyarbekir Eyalet. However, there were other Kurdish emirates outside Diyarbakır. Among the emirates were Sheikhan, Mahmudi, Ezdikhan, Ardalan, Bahdinan, Baban, Bitlis, Bohtan, Bradost, Dumli, Hakkari, Hasankeyf, Kilis, Mukriyan, Pazuki, and Soran. The Ottomans tolerated the Kurdish emirates as they did not pose a separatist threat, and also as a reward for the loyalty of Kurds during the wars with the Safavids. In the 1820s, the Ottomans had put the Kurdish emirates, as well as other autonomous entities all across the empire, under direct control.

In the Ottoman Empire, Kurdistan was always used to refer to the geographical area where the Kurds made up a majority, whether in or out of Ottoman territory. In a letter sent by Suleiman the Magnificent to Henry II of France, Suleiman included the name of various lands under Ottoman control, and he listed Kurdistan as one of them.

The Kurdistan Eyalet, formed in 1846, was the first time the word Kurdistan was used administratively in the Ottoman Empire, and the third time in history, after the Seljuk and Iranian provinces respectively.

In the 1882 edition of "Lugât-ı Tarihiyye ve Coğrafiyye", it stated that "Ottoman Kurdistan" was the lands "between Armenia, Jazira, Iraq-i Arab, and Ajamistan. It is three hundred and eighty kilometers in length, four hundred kilometers in length, it includes high mountains and fertile valleys." According to the same source, Safavid Kurdistan was referred to as "located west of Azerbaijan, northwest of Iraq-i Ajam, north of Khuzistan, and east of Ottoman Kurdistan. Its length is three hundred and seventy kilometers wide, two hundred and twenty-five kilometers wide and four hundred thousand people, and its center is Kermanshah."

In "Kâmûsü'l-A'lâm", which is considered the first Turkish encyclopedic dictionary, written by Sami Frashëri and published in 1896, it was mentioned that "Kurdistan is a large land in western Asia. Most of it remains in the Ottoman Empire, but some of it belongs to Iran. It is called Kurdistan, for the majority of its inhabitants are Kurds. However, this name does not have political or administrative connotations at the present time. In the past the name Kurdistan was given to a territory where currently the Ottoman Empire and Iran have established 'the province of Kurdistan.' It is notoriously hard to define the exact boundaries of Kurdistan, but approximately we can say that it starts from the shores of the lakes Urmia and Van, stretching down towards the rivers Diyala and Tigris to where Karasu mounts the Euphrates and from there north towards the line that separates Aras from the basin of the Tigris and Euphrates. Hence, it includes in the Ottoman Empire a part of Mosul, which is the territory lying on the left side of Tigris and Van, Bitlis, and parts of Diyarbakir province, and Memaret ül Aziz and Dersim. In Iran, Kurdistan covers half of Azerbaijan and the province known as Kurdistan. In this way, Kurdistan remains in a territory neighboring Azerbaijan in the northeast, Irak-i Ajam in the east, Luristan and Irak-i Arab in the south, the Jazira in the southeast, and Anatolia in the northwest. It resembles an upside-down pear that is located within the latitudes of 34-39 degrees and the longitudes of 37-46 degrees."

In Evliya Çelebi's 17th century travelogue, he stated that "named Kurdistan and the land of rocks [sengistan], this is a great land, which includes seventy different settlements. One corner of it starts from the northern side of the land of Erzurum and Van to the land of Hakkari, Cizre, Imadiyye, Mosul, Sehrizur, Harir, Ardalan, Baghdad, Derne, Derteng, and Basra. Located in between Arab Iraq and Anatolia, six thousand Kurdish tribes and clans dwell on these highlands, where the Persians would easily capture the Ottoman lands if they had not become a stronghold." Evliya Çelebi divided Kurdistan into "eyalet-i Kürdistan" (the province of Kurdistan), which was Diyarbekir and its immediate surroundings, and "diyar-i Kürdistan" (the land of Kurdistan), which was the rest of Kurdistan divided across the two empires. He used "Kürdistan-i Acemistan" to refer to Safavid Kurdistan.

=== Post-Ottoman era ===
During the 1919-1924 Mahmud Barzanji revolts, Turkish government publications referred to Iraqi Kurdistan and the former Mosul vilayet as "South Kurdistan", and advocated for its annexation. In TBMM sessions, Mahmud Barzanji was regularly praised as a "mujahid" who fought for the "independence" of "southern Kurdistan" from British-Iraqi occupation. By the early 1930s, Turkish newspapers continued to use "South Kurdistan" to distinguish it from the rest of Iraq. During the Turkish War of Independence, Turkey initially wanted to keep all of Greater Kurdistan. However, the Sheikh Said revolt led to Turkey stopping its claim over the Mosul vilayet and signing a treaty with the British in 1926 agreeing to the borders. The Turkish government was convinced that an even larger Kurdish population would have been more problematic. Shortly after the revolt, Turkey again attempted and failed to win Kurdish support in the Mosul question, claiming that the Sheikh Said revolt was a British plot under the guise of Kurds and Islam. Although the word Kurdistan was used normally in the Ottoman period and the early days of the Republic of Turkey, the word "Kurdistan" was removed from official use shortly after and became a taboo. The Turkish nationalist policies led to the increase of Kurdish nationalism which led to various uprisings like the Sheikh Said rebellion, Dersim rebellion, Koçgiri rebellion, and later the Kurdish Hezbollah insurgency and the Kurdistan Workers' Party insurgency.

Before his hardcore nationalist turn, Recep Tayyip Erdoğan proposed a revival of the Kurdistan Eyalet in 2013, claiming that Southeastern Anatolia was always known as Kurdistan before the Republic of Turkey was established in 1923. His remarks about the administrative divisions of the Ottoman Empire was criticised by many who interpreted them as signs of Erdoğan’s desire to implement a federal system, or Neo-Ottomanism. As a challenge to the Turkish nationalists, Erdoğan recalled that during the Ottoman era there were eyalets called Kurdistan and Lazistan. He stated that autonomy within the state of Turkey should be possible, and that it was not harmful but rather a source of strength for Turkey.

== Maps ==
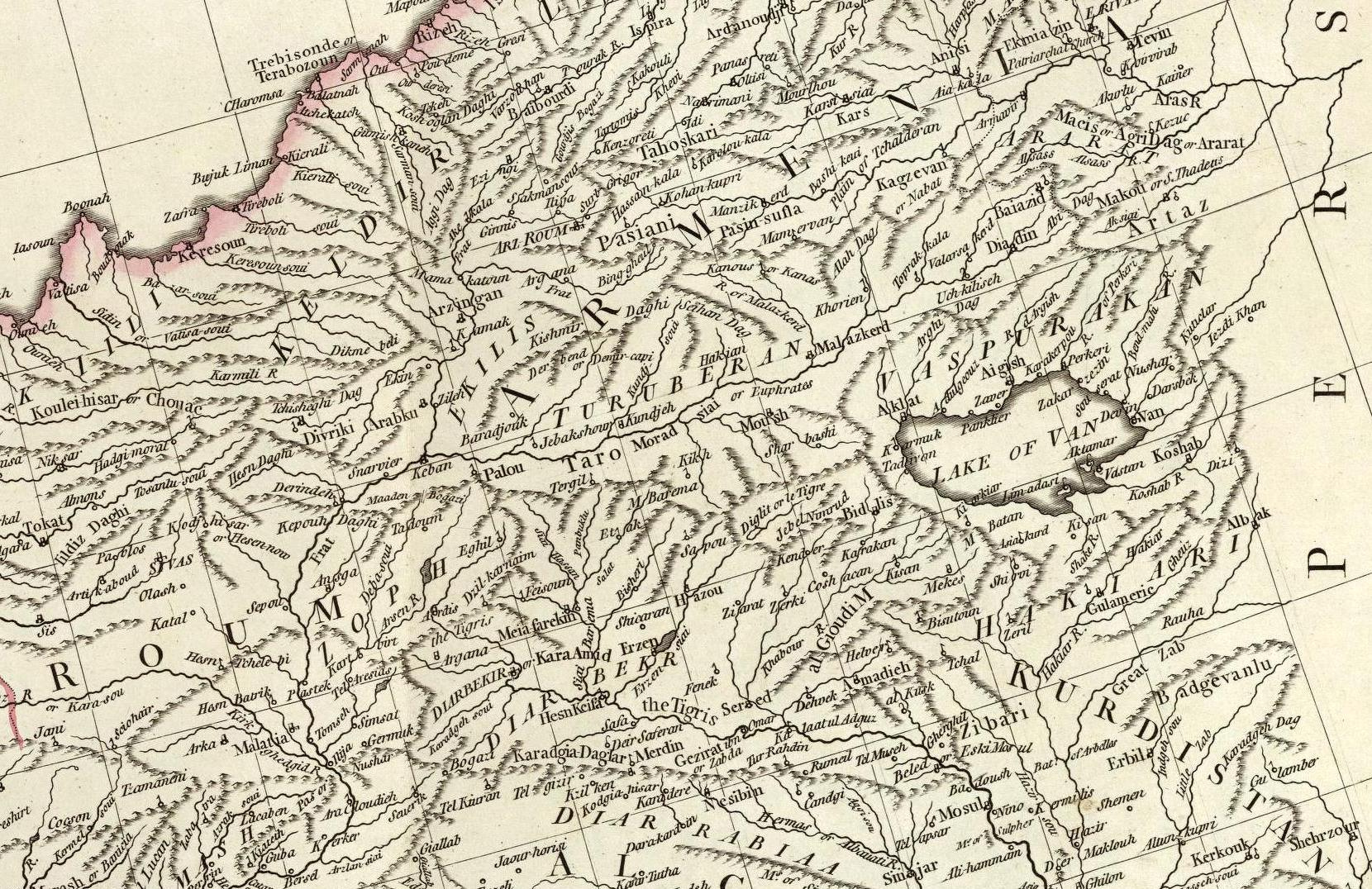
1785

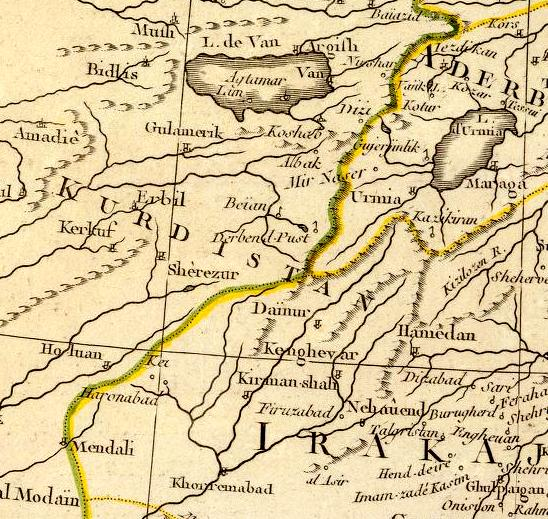
1787

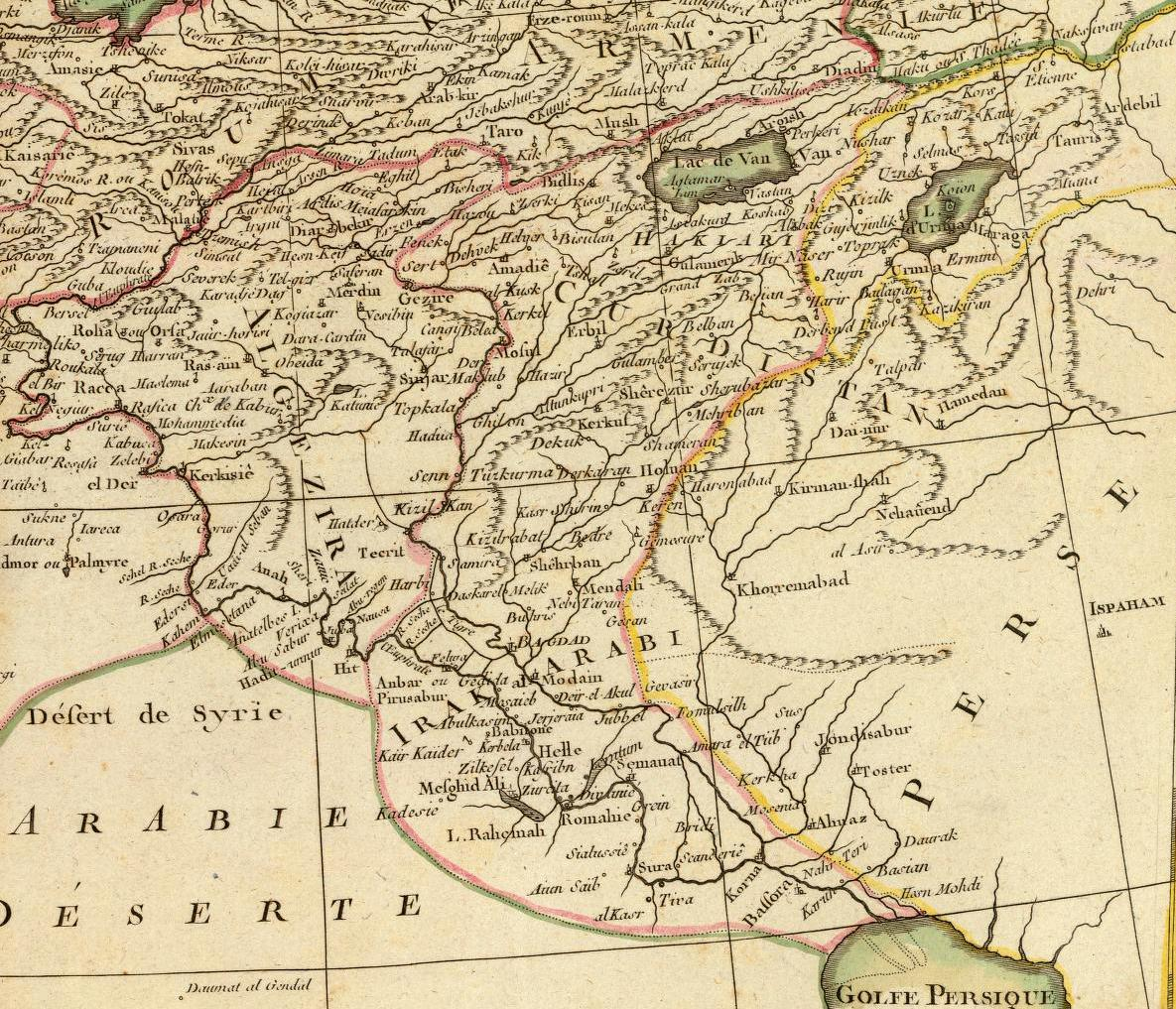
1791

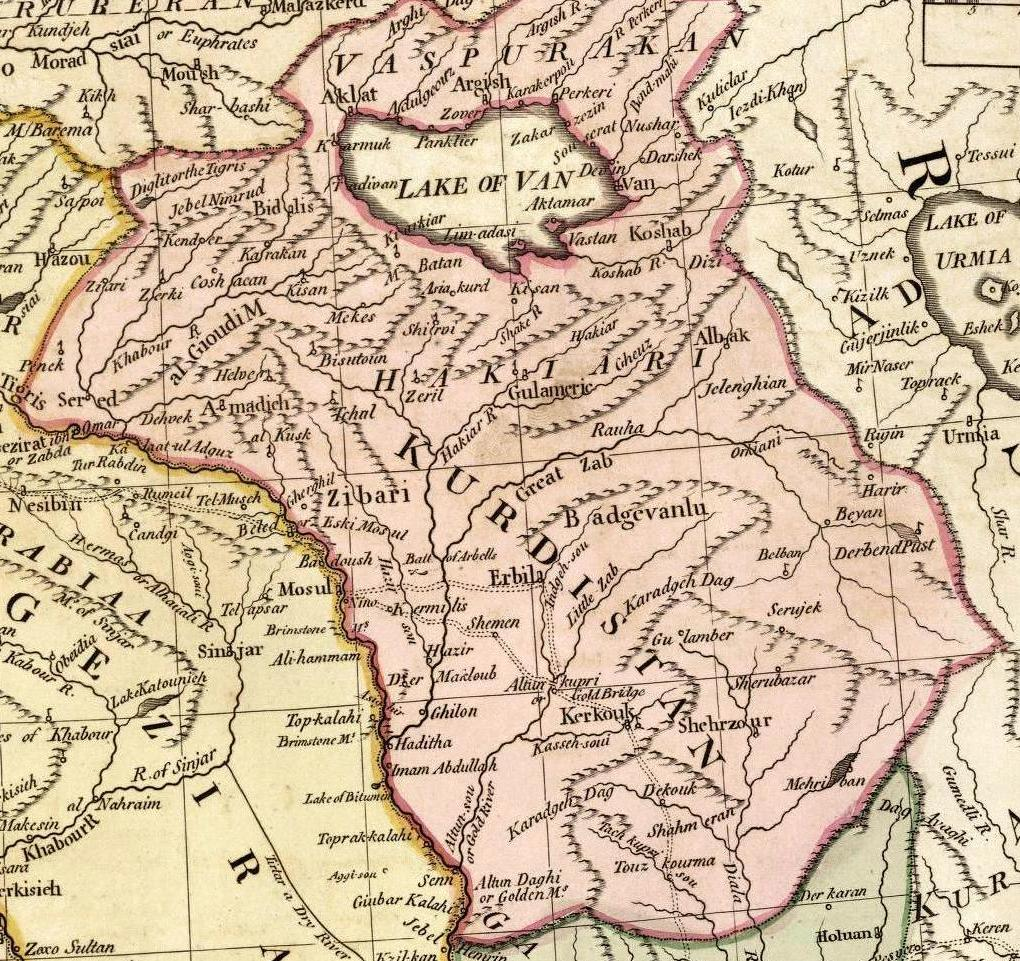
1794

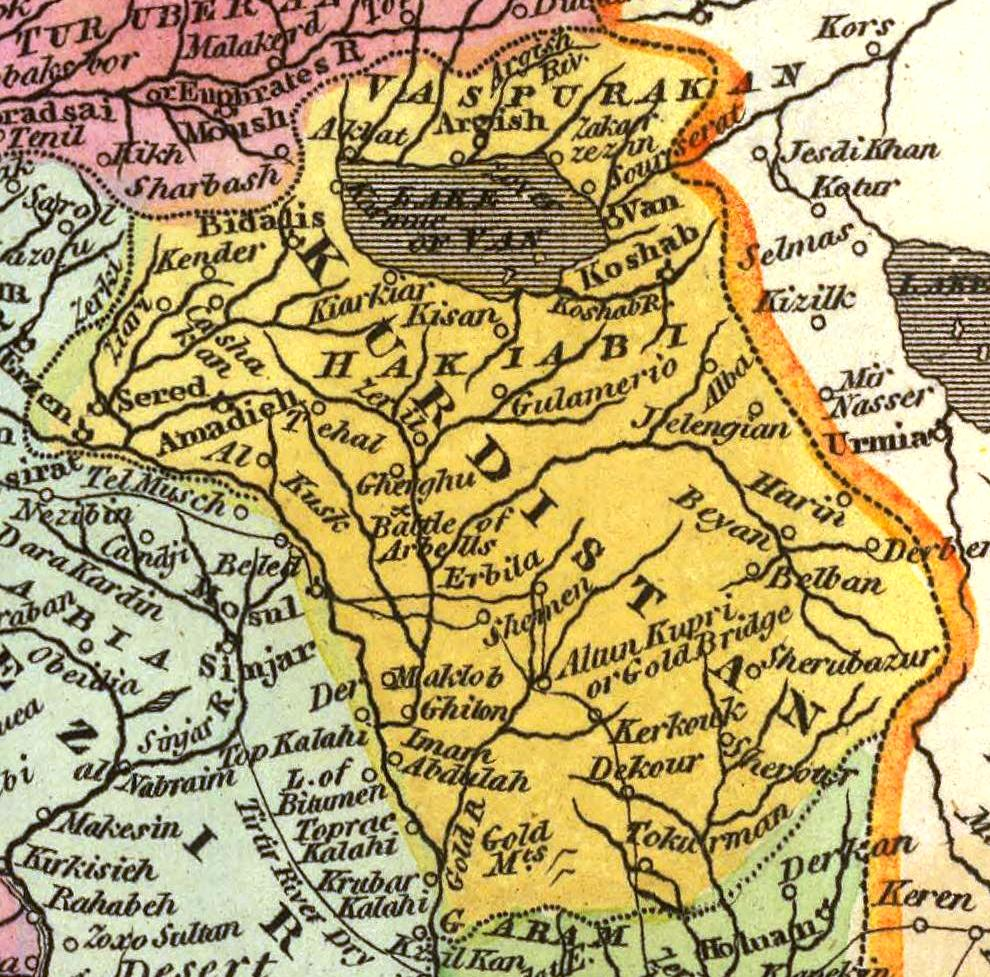
1811

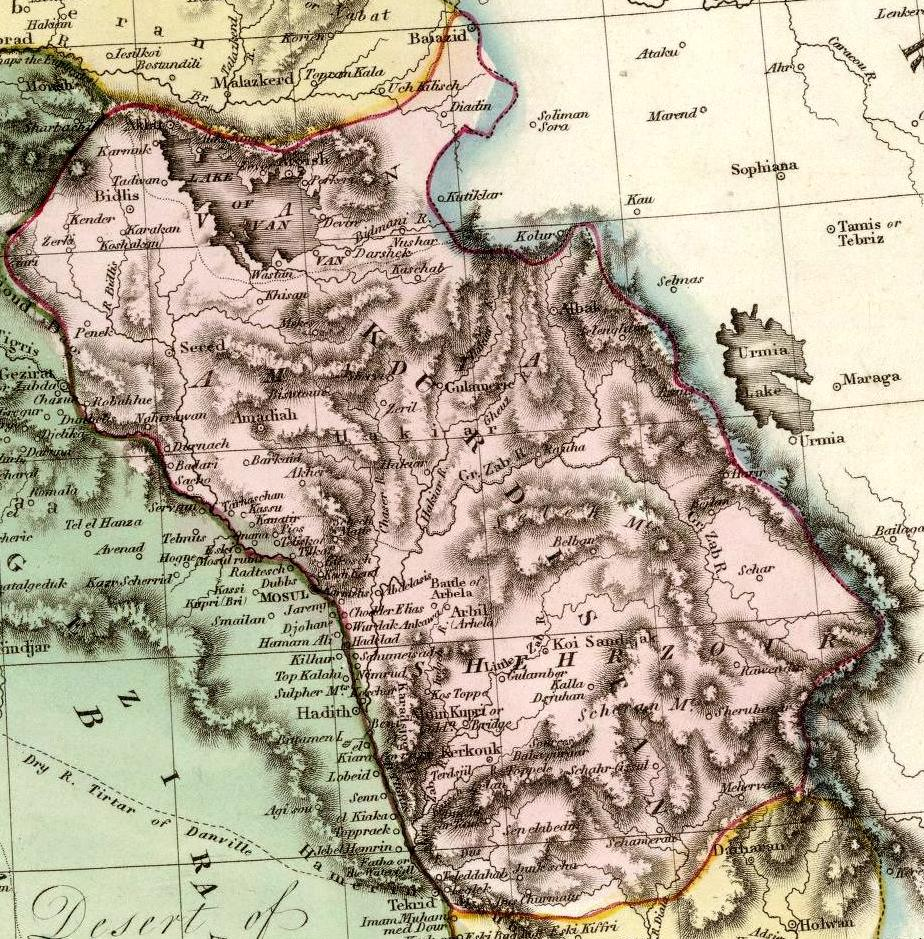
1813

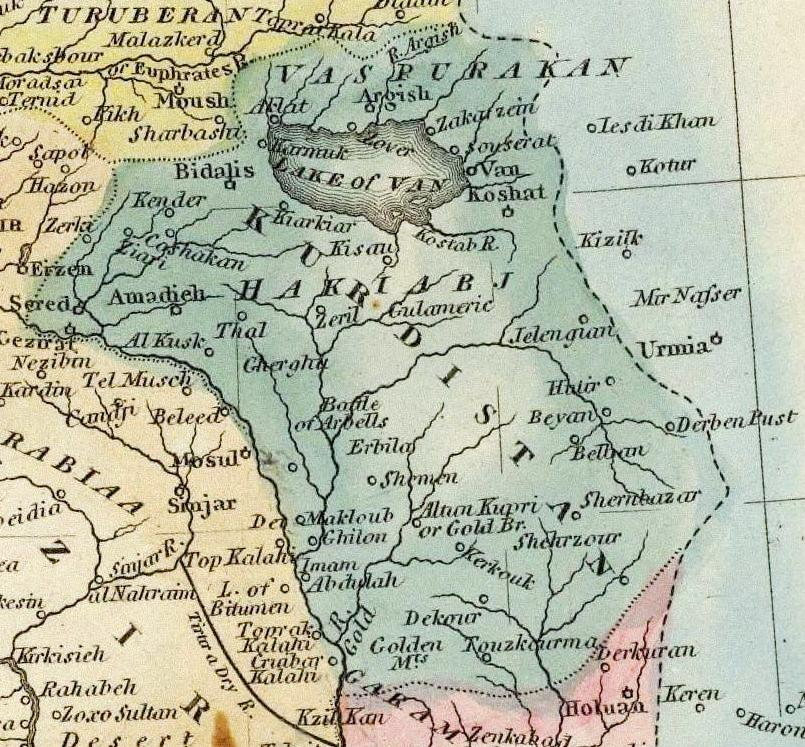
1823

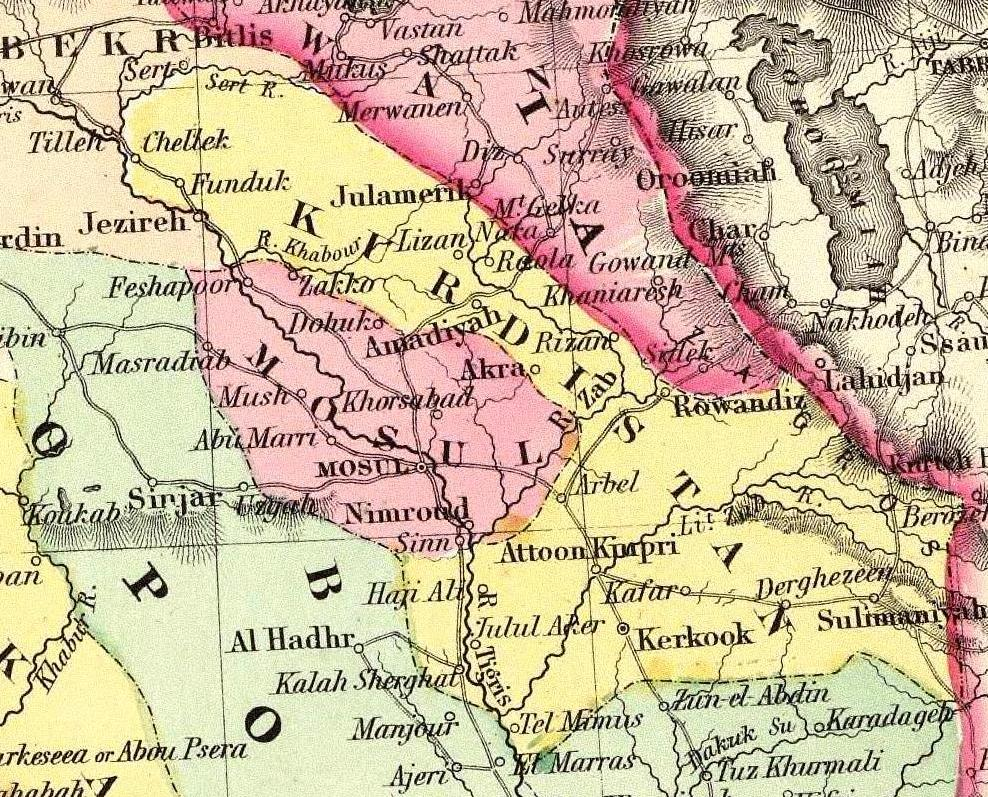
1856

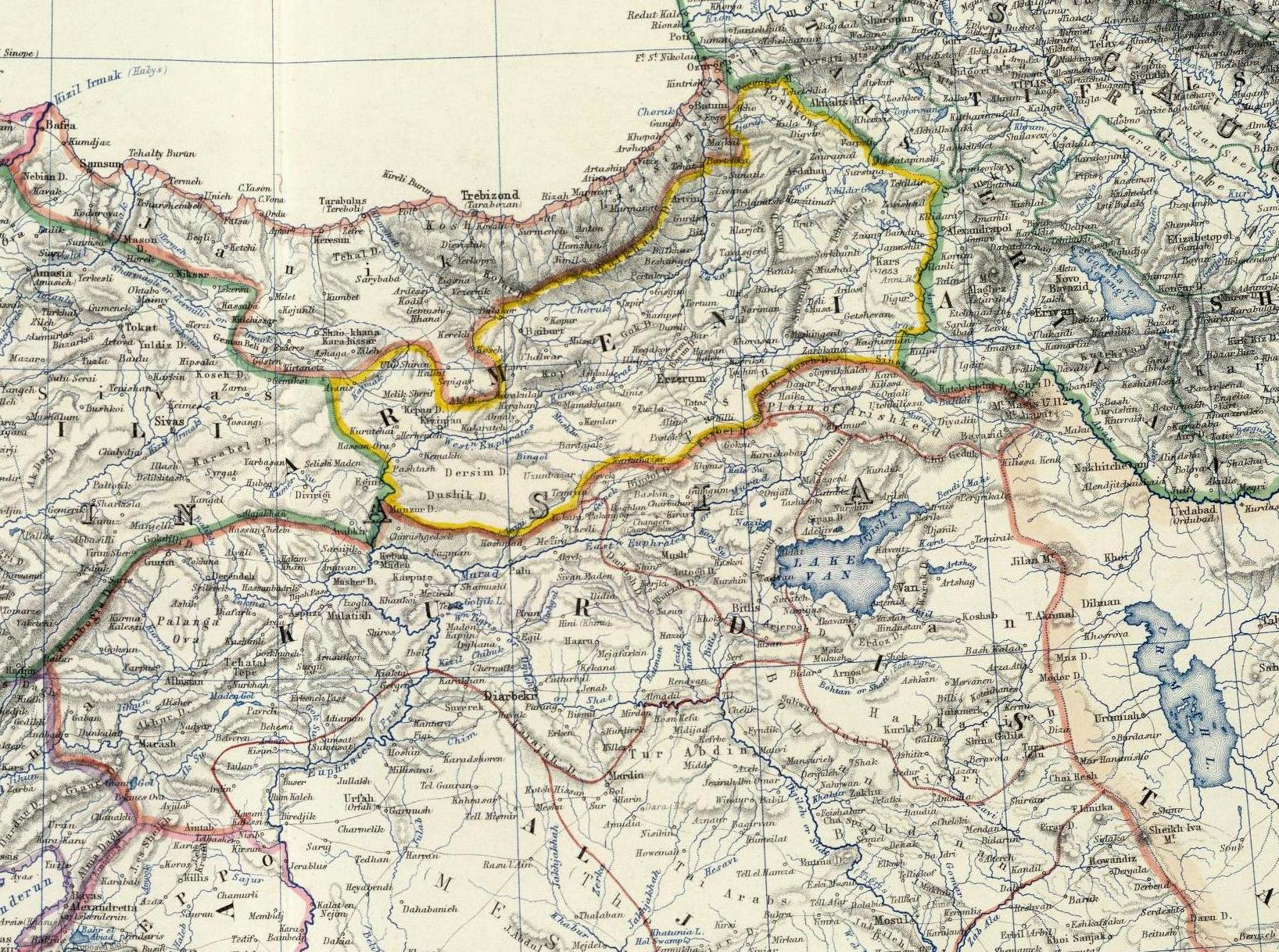
1861

== See also ==
- Ottoman Kurds
- Kurdish emirates
- Safavid Kurdistan
