= Hanne Safar =

Syriac mayor and leader (1859–1915)

Hanne Safar Pasha
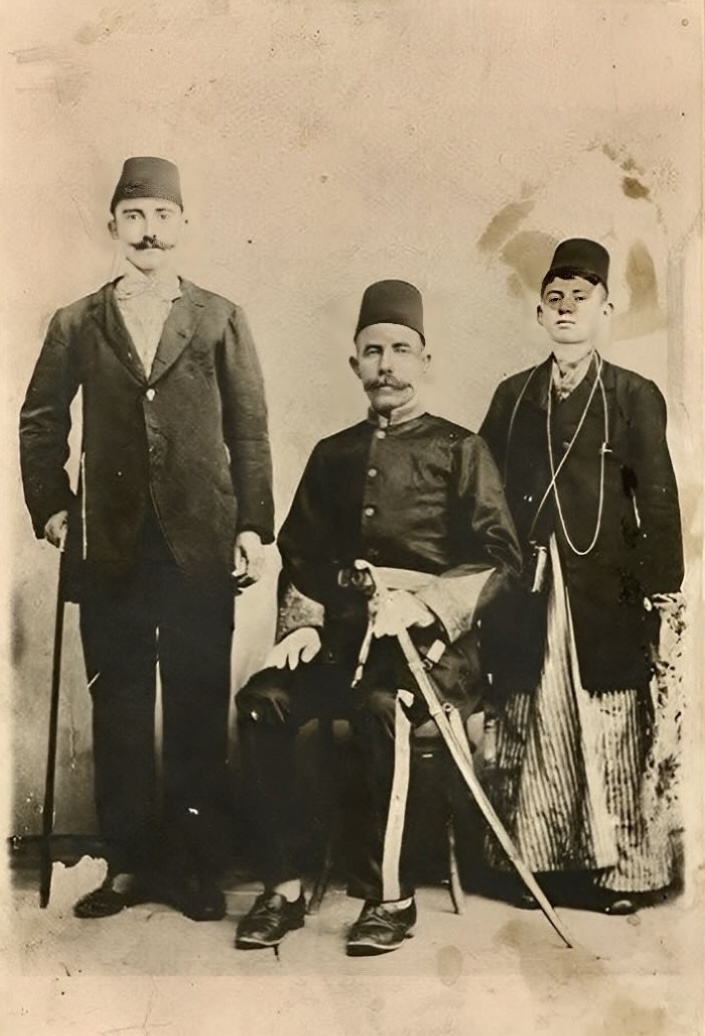
- Hanne Safar and his two sons Abdelkarim and Safar in Midyat
- Nickname: Hanne Pasha
- Born: 1859 Midyat, Ottoman Empire
- Died: 1915 (aged c.56) Midyat, Ottoman Empire
- Cause of death: Beheading
- Conflicts: Second Bedirkhanis Revolt
- Children: Abdelaziz, Abdelmasih

Hanne Safar (Syriac: ܚܢܐ ܣܦܪ) (1915–1859), also known as Hanne Safar Pasha, was a notable Syriac leader of the Syriac Orthodox community and mayor of Midyat during the late Ottoman Empire. He came from the noble Safar family, and worked in favor of the Ottoman state before his death in 1915 during the Sayfo.

It was because of his loyalty to the Sultan at the time, Abdülhamid II, that Safar was later granted the title of Pasha and a sword blessed by the Sultan.

== Background ==
Hanne Safar, a young Safar notable (also the clan head) and one of the few fluent in Ottoman Turkish, served as Şevket Bey’s advisor, coordinated local Syriac auxiliaries, and thereafter acted as the principal liaison between Midyat’s Christians and the Ottoman authorities, reportedly with an office in the district administration, and sat on the Dekşuri tribal confederation’s council until his death. He hailed from the notable Safar family, who came to Midyat from Ka‘biye, a village outside of Diyarbakir.

During the 1895 Hamidian massacres, Ottoman authorities formally aimed to strike Armenians while sparing the Syriac community of Midyat. Patriarch Mor Ignatius Aphrem I Barsoum records that on October 29, Syriac Orthodox notables Hanne Safar and his cousin Shakoro secured a pledge from the regional Turkish commander to protect the Syriacs per the vali’s directives. This protection held from November 29 until April 1896, which is why Tur Abdin largely escaped the worst atrocities then reported from Hasankeyf to Mor Augin and from Cizre to Mardin.

== Leadership ==
In January 1888, Hanne Safar sent a letter to the Syriac Orthodox patriarch concerning the Ottoman registration system. He reported that many Syriac households in Midyat and surrounding villages were registering with the state as Armenian, Catholic or Protestant for practical advantages, even though in daily life they continued to attend Syriac churches, receive baptism and communion from Syriac clergy, and marry according to Syriac rites. He described these official identities as "contrary to reality," criticized local priests for religious laxity, and remarked that religion had become "a game for small children." He warned that such practices threatened to dissolve the officially recognized Syriac millet, because rival millets could claim that "this many houses have joined us," thereby absorbing Syriac households on paper.

Safar pointed to contemporary reports that 1,400 households in Tur Abdin had "become Armenian" and feared that only a few Syriac households might remain in the official rolls. To prevent this, he urged the patriarch to impose a strict rule that priests, village headmen and other communal authorities should not administer or receive the sacraments from anyone who did not publicly identify as Syriac in state records. In his view, aligning public registration with the community’s actual religious life was necessary to preserve the Syriac millet’s demographic and legal standing.

In Tur Abdin, where Syriac Orthodox notables often aligned with the pro-Ottoman Dekşuri confederation, the Safar family were prominent, and around 1894 the council chose Hanne Safar to lead for four years. On his way to the investiture near Gercüş, agha Aliko ambushed him, arguing with backing from local sheikhs that a Christian could not take responsibility for their affairs.

Safar responded by asking why religion was being mixed into the confederation’s worldly business and what part of the job depends on the leader’s faith rather than competence; he added, "I personally do not see a good reason to withdraw my nomination because I am religiously different from you." He said leadership meant uniting the clans, defending their territory and resources, and ensuring mutual protection and support. Safar was then freed by a joint force of Muslims and Christians.

Sultan Abdul Hamid gave medals and decorations to important local people in areas where his control was weak, to turn them into personal allies. In Midyat, Hanne Safar, head of the Safar clan, received the Hamidi medal. He represented the Syriac community at official ceremonies, wearing his medals, decorations, and a special sword. As a state-certified ethnic leader, he had real authority and ran Syriac affairs in Midyat and nearby villages according to the sultan’s wishes. His main job was to stop any movements the government saw as subversive.

== Sayfo ==
Tur Abdin had two big confederations: Dekşuri (pro-government) and Haverkan (often against it). Dekşuri chiefs lived in Arnes; Haverkan was split between the Hajo house at M’are near Nusaybin and the Chelebi house at Mzizah near Midyat. Of 18 tribes around Midyat, 11 were Haverkan and 5 were Dekşuri. When war began, both Haverkan chiefs were in jail, so Sarokhano led the Chelebi side and Hasan led the Hajo side; both first promised to protect Syriacs, but in the summer of 1915, Hajo joined the killings while Chelebi tried, with limited success, to shield Christians.

Policy toward Syriacs was vague: the central government stayed silent, while provincial and local officials targeted them like Armenians. The main difference was method: Armenians faced deportations, but Syriacs were mostly killed at or near home, likely to avoid notifying the center and to carry out a fast, semi secret campaign.

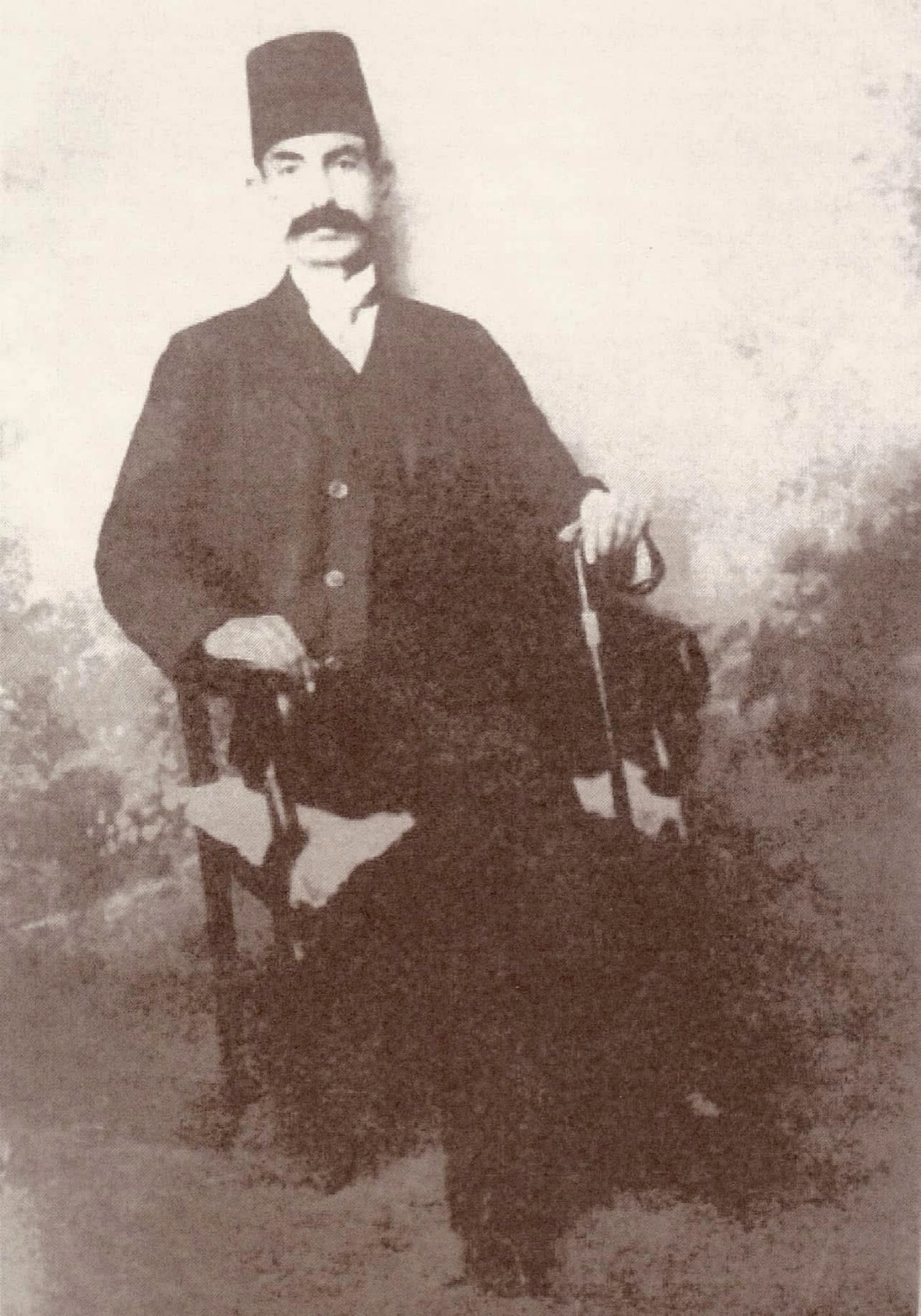
Photograph of Galle Hirmiz, the Aramean Mayor of Midyat.

Galle Hirmiz hails from the Hirmiz family, a wealthy merchant family also of Aramean origin that moved to Midyat in the 18th century, and he later served as mayor from 1894 to 1903. Early in 1915, Midyat's Christian leaders met in the church of Mort Shmuni to plan a joint defense, where Hanne Safar, representing the Syriac Orthodox community, and Galle Hirmiz, representing the Protestants, joined the priests and elders in placing their hands on the Bible and swore to stand together. Informers carried news of the pact to the authorities, and the kaymakam summoned Safar to the town hall, claiming without proof that Protestants and Catholics had dangerous foreign ties while Syriac Orthodox would be safe. With that claim circulating, and amid complaints among some Syriacs about risking themselves for the wealthy Hirmiz clan, Hanne withdrew from the pact and, saying he needed to protect the Syriac Orthodox community, helped the authorities arrest adult men from the Hirmiz family. Some relatives surrendered, officials said the detainees would go to a court martial in Mardin, but they were killed on the road and thrown into wells near Astal, west of Midyat.

Amid the first waves of killing, Hanne Safar was seized and beheaded with his own ceremonial sword. His head was fixed to a pole and paraded through Midyat while crowds shouted, "This is the head of the Syriac leader in Midyat, take care of him," after which boys were given the head to kick like a football. Looting spread as Christian homes were stripped of valuables and even doors and windows, and at the Shaqfo market boys were thrown from a high roof.
