= Abdürrezzak Bedir Khan =

Kurdish politician

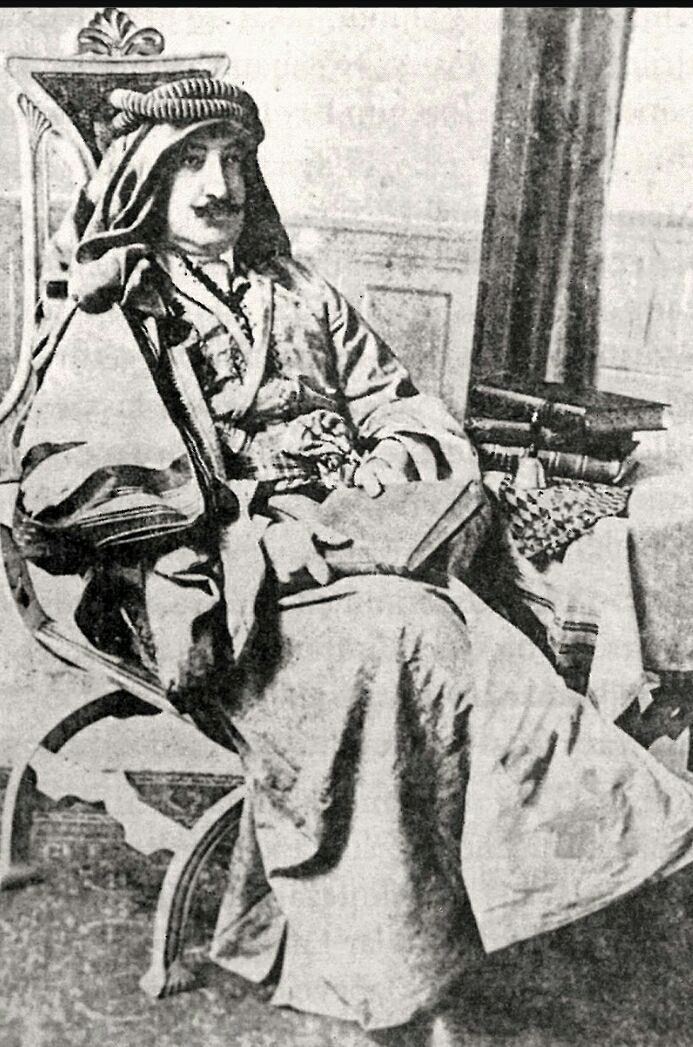
- Abdürrezzak Bedir Khan in 1915

Personal details
- Born: 1864 Constantinople, Ottoman Empire
- Died: 1918 (54~ years old) Ankara, Ottoman Empire
- Manner of death: Assassination
- Relatives: Bedir Khan family

Abdürrezzak Bedir Khan (1864 in Constantinople – 1918) was an Ottoman Kurdish diplomat, politician and a member of the Bedir Khan family.

== Education ==
After he graduated from school, he entered into the Ottoman administration, following his father to the sanjak Aydin, where his father has been appointed as the Governor. After it was not possible for him to pursue his studies in Europe, he accepted an offer to complete his formation as an Ottoman diplomat in the Foreign Ministry of the Ottoman Empire in 1885.

== Diplomatic career ==
In 1889, he was sent to Saint Petersburg in the Russian Empire to work for one year in the Ottoman Consulate as a secretary. As he returned to Constantinople, he asked for more work and was offered an office at the Consulate in Tehran. It was a post he eventually was not able to assume as he was called back to Constantinople. He didn't comply with the demand and left for the Russian Empire, in which he wanted to settle in Yerevan. Through his diplomatic relations he established during his time at the consulate in Saint Petersburg, he managed to arrive in Tiflis but his plans to live in Yerevan were dashed due to pressures from the Ottoman Empire. From Tiflis he began a wide journey over Batumi, Kiev and then also the United Kingdom, before his father Mustafa Bedir Khan compelled him to return to Constantinople in 1894. Back in the Ottoman capital, he was given a post in the office of the master of ceremonies in Constantinople. As such he got to know several European diplomats to which he retained long-lasting cordial relations. In January 1906 he had a dispute with members of the Ottoman bureaucracy opposed to the renovation of the street leading to Abdürrezzaks house in Şişli. Abdürrezzak then sequestrated Ahmed Ağa, who opposed the renovation which prompted Ridvan Pasha to send fifty followers of him to attack Abdürrezzak household. Ridvans men have killed a servant of Abdürrezzak, managed to liberate Ahmed Ağa. He then also achieved to defend himself from reprisals by Abdürrezzak who complained about their actions to Sultan Abdul Hamid II. This then lead Abdürrezzak to encourage the assassination of Rıdvan Pasha following which he was dismissed, sentenced and imprisoned in Tripoli, (in present-day Libya) in 1906. Other members of the Bedir Khan family were sent into exile for this accusation. Following the Young Turk Revolution in 1908, he was not pardoned and permitted to return from exile as other members of the Bedir Khans and remained in detention until he was released in 1910. The same year, he applied for asylum to the Russian Empire citing the German General Helmuth von Moltke, (who met with Abdürrezzak's father Bedir Khan in the 1830s) as a reference.

In 1911, several members of the Bedir Khan family toured the Bohtan area, also Abdürrezzak who at the time intended to be elected as a deputy for the Ottoman Parliament. In 1912, he was supporting a Kurdish uprising around Erzurum. By 1913 he demanded the inclusion of the Kurds in negotiations concerning an eventual land reform of the eastern provinces. He argued that a lot of the land which was discussed to come under Armenian rule was owned and populated by a Kurdish majority. In 1917, after the Russians captured the eastern provinces of Anatolia, he was given the post of a Governor in Bitlis, following which he attempted to gain the Russians assistance for the Kurdish aims of an independent Kurdistan. The Ottomans reportedly stated that he was seen as a leader of the Kurdish tribes by the Russians, and that he attended a meeting with them together with Simko Shikak in May 1914. He was killed in 1918, and it is unclear on the orders of whom he was killed.

== Personal life ==
He was born to Necib Pasha Bedir Khan and Hanife Bedir Khan into a household of the Bedir Khan family. He married Henriette Hornik of Austrian origin with whom he had a daughter in 1903 who was to be known as Leyla Bedir Khan.
