= Kurdistan Eyalet =

Former province of the Ottoman Empire

- 1846–1867
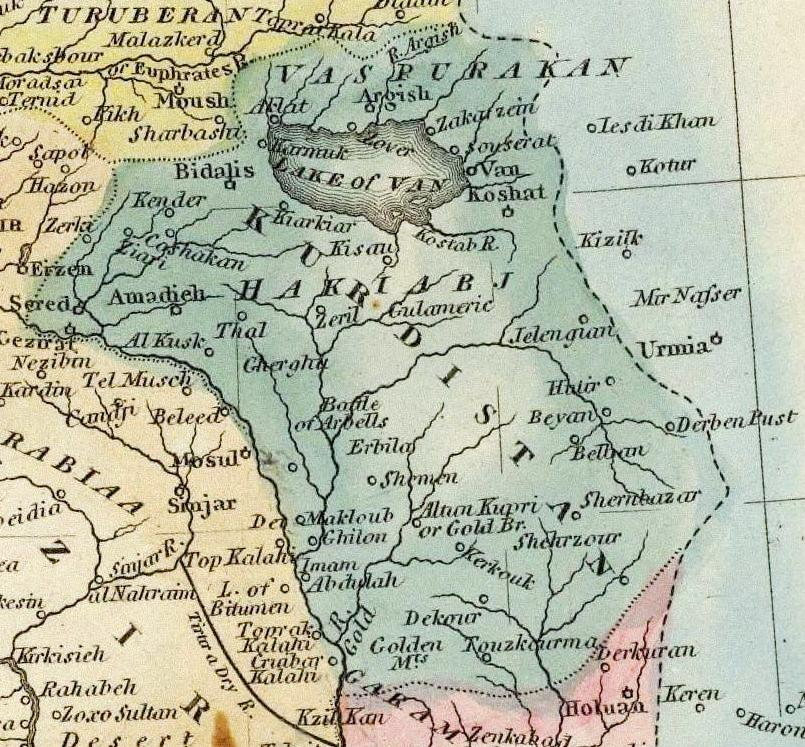
- Capital: Diyarbekir
- History
  - Established: 1846
  - Disestablished: 1867
| Preceded by | Succeeded by |
| Diyarbekir Eyalet | Diyarbekir Vilayet |
- Today part of: Turkey

Kurdistan Eyalet (Ottoman Turkish: ایالت کردستان, romanized: Eyâlet-ı Kurdistan) was an eyalet of the Ottoman Empire. It was the first time that the Ottoman Empire used the term "Kurdistan" to refer to an administrative unit rather than a geographical region. It was formed with the aim of establishing direct control over Ottoman Kurdistan, rather than politicizing it.

== History ==
It was a short-lived province as it only lasted about 21 years, between 1846 and 1867. One year after its establishment the Kurdish strongman Bedir Khan Beg and former ruler of large parts of the Kurdistan Eyalet, was defeated in his castle in Eruh. Following the region lacked a powerful Kurdish ruler which led to the rise of the religious sheikhs belonging to the Naqshbandi and Qadiriyya dervish orders, or tariqas. In 1867, it was abolished and succeeded by the Diyarbekir Vilayet. During its existence, it saw twelve different governors who had either the title of müsir or vizier.

== Extension ==
Initially the eyalet covered the region of the former Kurdish Emirate of Bohtan, but it was expanded gradually and at its widest extension included the former Diyarbekir Eyalet and the areas around Van, Hakkari and Muş, as well as the districts of Botan, Mardin, and Cizre. According to the salnames between 1847 and 1867, it was ruled by the central Ottoman government and received annual funding of 80,000 piastres, considerably more than the Mosul Eyalet. In 1853, the eyalet counted with four sancaks, namely the ones of Diyarbakir, Muş, Siirt, and Dersim. The tax register of 1852 also named the cities Cizre, Muş and Hakkari among others.

== Legacy ==
Recep Tayyip Erdoğan proposed a revival of the Kurdistan Eyalet in 2013, claiming that Southeastern Anatolia was always referred to as Kurdistan before the 1923 establishment of the Republic of Turkey. His remarks referring to the provincial administration of the Ottoman Empire was criticised by many who interpreted them as signs of Erdoğan’s desire to implement a federal system. To challenge the Turkish nationalists, Erdogan recalled that during the Ottoman era there were eyalets called Kurdistan and Lazistan. He stated that autonomous self-governance within the state of Turkey should be possible and would even be a source of strength for Turkey.
