= Bedri Pasha Bedir Khan =

Kurdish politician in the Ottoman Empire

Bedri Pasha Bedir Khan (1847/48 in Cizre – 1911) was an Ottoman Kurdish politician and a member of the Bedir Khan family.

== Early life and education ==
Bedri Pasha Bedir Khan was born in Cizre, at a time his father Bedir Khan Beg was involved in the defense of Bohtan, which he eventually wouldn't achieve and be exiled to Crete. It is reported that his mother was of Yazidi origin. Bedri Pasha was educated by teachers in Crete and following was able to communicate in Turkish, Arabic and Persian, besides Greek.

== Career ==
In 1871, began to work for the Ottoman government in the a Syrian village in the Hawran district. His appointment as a Kurd, was according to a policy of Mehmed Reshid Pasha the Vali of the Vilayat, with which he attempted to cause division within the Druze, and Bedouin communities in the sancaks of Hama, Hawran and Nablus. He has organized Kurdish troops from Syria for the Ottoman Empire in view of the Ottoman-Russian war in 1877–1878. After the war, he shortly fell in suspicion for holding aspirations for Kurdish autonomy but he was acquitted from the accusations and served the Ottoman administration as a Kaymakam in Quneitra and Safed. From the 1880s onwards, he was several times promoted in the Ottoman administration. First to Mütessarif of the sancak of Hawran, then in Hama, and later also to Tripolis.

After some resistance by his part, he was moved to Constantinople and welcomed by the network of Mehmed Khamil Pasha, the former Governor of Aleppo and the Grand Visier of the Ottoman Empire at the time. He became a member of the Ottoman bureaucracy until the murder of Ridvan Pasha in 1906 for which Ali Shamil and Abdürrezzak of the Bedir Khan family were blamed for. Most of the family members were sent away from Constantinople into exile. Bedri was exiled to the Rhodos in the Aegean Sea.. After the Young Turk Revolution in 1908, he was permitted to return to Constantinople and again given a salary, but not a post. He died in 1911.

== Bibliography ==
- Barbara Henning, Narratives of the History of the Ottoman-Kurdish Bedirhani Family in Imperial and Post-Imperial Contexts, pp. 186–189
