= Kürd =

Kürd or Kurd may refer to the following villages:

- Kürd Eldarbəyli, Azerbaijan
- Kürd Mahruzlu, Azerbaijan
- Kürd, Goychay, Azerbaijan
- Kürd, Jalilabad, Azerbaijan
- Kürd, Qabala, Azerbaijan

== See also ==
- Kurd (disambiguation)
- Kūrd, a tribe of Balochistan, Pakistan
