= Abdul Aziz Yamulki =

General in the Ottoman Empire

- Abdul Aziz Yamulki
- Born: 21 December 1890; Sulaimaniyah, Mosul Province, Ottoman Empire
- Died: 25 July 1981 (aged 90); Sulaimaniyah, Iraq
- Military career
- Allegiance: Ottoman Empire, Kingdom of Kurdistan, Iraq
- Rank: General
- Unit: Mechanical Transport

Abdul Aziz Yamulki (21 December 1890 – 25 July 1981) was the son of Mustafa Yamulki, nephew of Said Pasha Kurd and Kurd Ahmet Izzet Pasha and a cousin of Şerif Pasha and Kurd Fuad Pasha.

Yamulki was born into a prominent family from Sulaymaniah; Aziz was raised in a privileged environment and moved to Constantinople, where lived in his uncle's Said Pasha Kurd's palace and attended the Ottoman military academy. His father had returned to his native Sulaymaniah after the fall of the Ottoman Empire. Aziz would later join the Iraqi military.

== Golden Square of Colonels ==
Aziz and seven other officers mainly of Kurdish ethnicity started to plot the downfall of the Iraqi government of Bakr Sidqi. These officers included:

- Aziz Yamulki, officer commanding Mechanical Transport.
- Amin al-Umari, officer commanding the first Infantry Division.
- Salah ad-Din as-Sabbagh, as Director of Military Operations.
- Mahmud Salman, as officer commanding Mechanized Forces.
- Kamil Shabib, as Commandant of the Infantry.

== The Plot ==
The "plan of assassination was an elaborate and carefully considered one". Aziz had drawn up four plans to carry out Sidqi's assassination, the first was to kill him at the Mosul Rest House, the second, at his brother's house, the third, by an attack on Bakr's car on his way to Tel-Kutchuk and finally the master plan at the Military Club where it was planned to entertain Bakr in the evening on the day of his arrival. Aziz Yamulki, then president of the club, was to give a secret signal and the assassination was to take place when the lights were to be put out.

== Diplomatic corps ==
After his involvements in the coup d'état, Aziz was distanced by being sent to Afghanistan as Iraq's Charge d'Affaires at Kabul. He was appointed Consul of Iraq at Karachi on 17 August 1943.

Aziz Yamulki
