= Simko =

Simko, Šimko or Simkó is a surname. Notable people with the surname include:

- Simko Ahmed (born 1972), Kurdish artist
- Simko Shikak (1887–1930) Kurdish leader
- David Simko (born 1954), American racing driver
- Imre Simkó (1939–2021), Hungarian sport shooter
- Ivan Šimko (born 1955), Slovak politician
- Joe Simko, American illustrator
- Julián Šimko (1886–1956), Slovak politician
- Kate Simko, American electronic music producer
- Marek Šimko (born 1988), Slovak ice hockey player
- Otto Šimko (1924–2026), Slovak jurist and Holocaust survivor
- Patrik Šimko (born 1991), Slovak footballer
- Pavel Šimko (born 1982), Slovak triathlete
