= Kurdish =

Kurdish may refer to:

- Kurdish people (Kurds)
- Kurdish language
  - Northern Kurdish (Kurmanji)
  - Central Kurdish (Sorani)
  - Southern Kurdish
  - Laki Kurdish
- Kurdish alphabets
- Kurdistan, the land of the Kurdish people which includes:
  - Southern Kurdistan
  - Eastern Kurdistan
  - Northern Kurdistan
  - Western Kurdistan

== See also ==
- Kurd (disambiguation)
- Kurdish literature
- Kurdish music
- Kurdish rugs
- Kurdish cuisine
- Kurdish culture
- Kurdish nationalism
