= Kurdi =

Kurdish language, a Northwestern Iranian language spoken by the Kurds.

Kurdi may also refer to:

- Jaban al-Kurdi, Sahabi of Islam
- Kurdi (poet) pen name for the 19th century Kurdish poet Mustafa Bag Sahebqran
- Curdi, also transliterated as Kurdi, a now-submerged village in Goa, India
- Alan Kurdi, a three-year-old Kurdish Syrian boy whose image made global headlines after he drowned in the Mediterranean Sea

== See also ==
- Kurd (disambiguation)
- Kurdish (disambiguation)
