= Fuad Pasha =

Fuad Pasha often refers to Keçecizade Mehmed Fuad Pasha, but may also refer to:

- Deli Fuad Pasha (1835–1931), Ottoman soldier and statesman
- Kurd Fuad Pasha, Ottoman–Kurdish soldier and statesman
- Ali Fuat Pasha Cebesoy (1882–1968), Ottoman/Turkish soldier and statesman
