= Curds and whey =

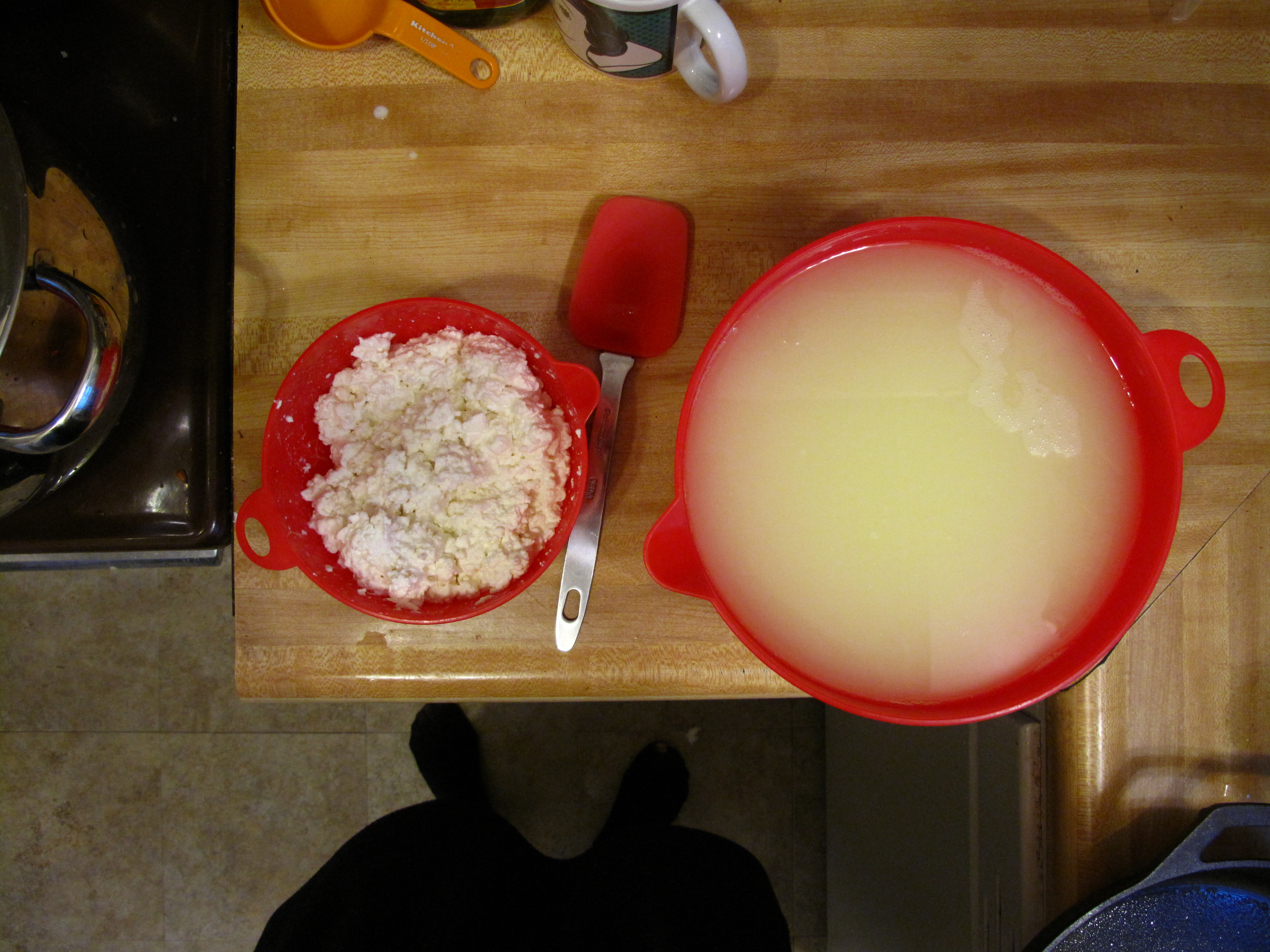
Curds (left) are milk solids; whey is the remaining liquid

Curds and whey may refer to:

- Collectively, curds and whey, the dairy products
- Little Miss Muffet, the nursery rhyme, wherein she consumes them
- Cottage cheese, also called "curds and whey"
- Junket (dessert), a dish historically known as "curds and whey"

== See also ==
- Curd (disambiguation)
