= Kurd (name) =

Kurd is a masculine German given name and a Kurdish and Baloch/Brahui surname.

== Notable people ==
=== Given name ===
- Kurd Lasswitz (1848–1910), a German author
- Kurd Kisshauer (1886–1958), German astronomer
- Kurd Maverick, German DJ
- Kurd Mehmed Pasha (died c. 1605), Ottoman statesman
- Kurd Peters (1914–1957), German officer
- Kurd von Mosengeil (1884–1906), German physicist
- Kurd von Schlözer (1822–1894), German historian and diplomat
- Kurd von Schöning (1789–1859), Prussian army officer and historian

=== Surname ===
- Abdul Aziz Kurd, an early 20th-century Baloch nationalist politician
- Abdulla Kurd (1977–2011), Kurdish militant fighting in Chechnya
- Ahmad Kurd (1949–2020), politician from the Gaza Strip
- Ali Ahmad Kurd (fl. 2007), Pakistani lawyer
- Keça Kurd (born 1948), Kurdish writer and translator
- Javed Kurd (born 1967), Pakistani-Norwegian music producer.
- Said Pasha Kurd (1834–1907), Ottoman statesman
