= Kurd Said Pasha =

Ottoman minister of foreign affairs (1834–1907)

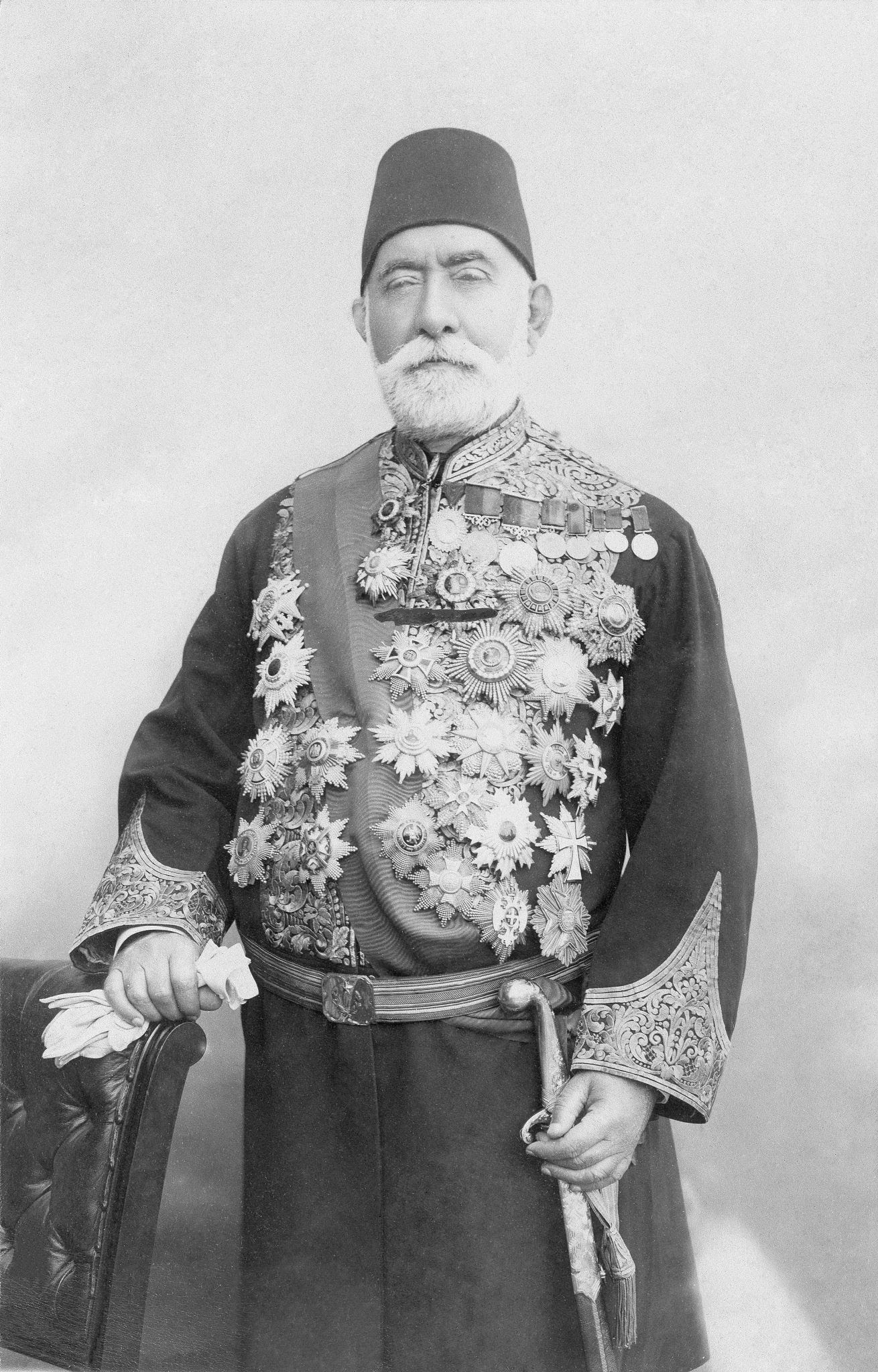

President of the Council of State
- In office 1895 – 20 October 1907

Ottoman Minister of Foreign Affairs
- In office 1885–1895
- In office 1881–1881

Ottoman Ambassador to Germany
- In office 1883–1885

Governor of the Vilayet of the Archipelago
- In office 1881–1881

Personal details
- Born: 1834 Sulaymaniyah, Ottoman Empire
- Died: 20 October 1907 (aged 72–73) Constantinople, Ottoman Empire
- Children: Şerif Pasha; Kurd Fuad Pasha
- Parent: Hussein Pasha (father)
- Relatives: Kurd Ahmet Izzet Pasha (brother); Mustafa Yamulki (brother-in-law)

Kurd Said Pasha (1834 – 20 October 1907) was an Ottoman Kurdish statesman. He served as the Minister of Foreign Affairs in 1881 and again from 1885 to 1895. He also served as the President of the Council of State (Şura-yı Devlet) from 1895 until his death.

== Early life and family ==
Said Pasha was born in Sulaymaniyah in 1834. He was the son of Hussein Pasha of Sulaymaniyah.

He was the brother of Kurd Ahmet Izzet Pasha and the brother-in-law of Mustafa Yamulki. He was the father of the diplomat and nationalist Şerif Pasha and the general Kurd Fuad Pasha. He was also the uncle of Abdul Aziz Yamulki.

== Career ==
After holding various administrative posts, Said Pasha became the Governor-General of the Vilayet of the Archipelago in 1881. Later that same year, he was appointed Minister of Foreign Affairs for the first time.

In 1883, he was appointed as the Ottoman Ambassador to Berlin. He returned to the position of Foreign Minister in 1885, serving in that capacity until 1895.

Following his tenure as Foreign Minister, he was appointed President of the Council of State, an office which he held until his death in 1907.
