= Sulaymaniyah =

City in the Kurdistan Region, Iraq

Sulaymaniyah سلێمانی (Sorani Kurdish) السليمانية (Arabic) Silêmanî (Kurmanji Kurdish)
- City
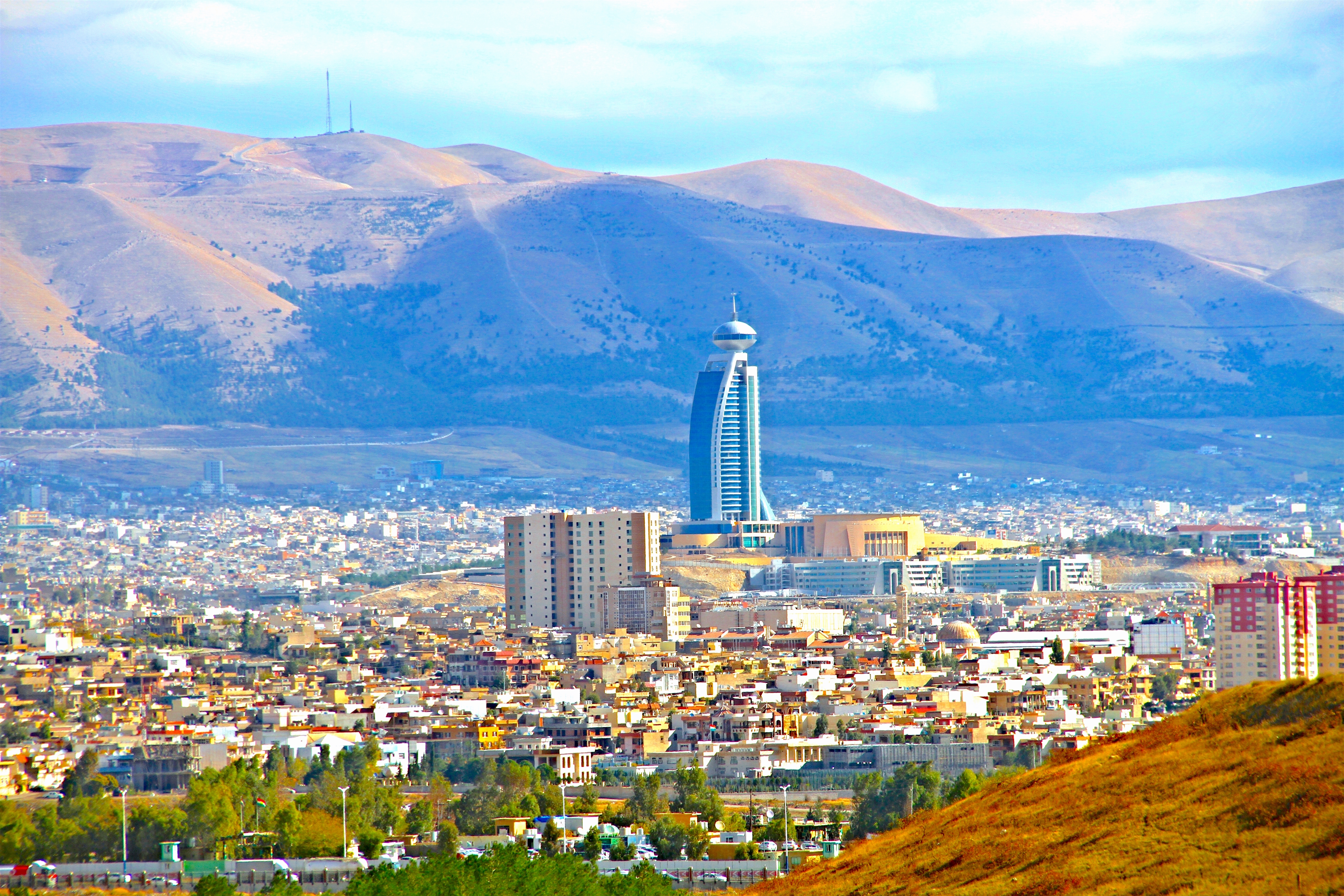
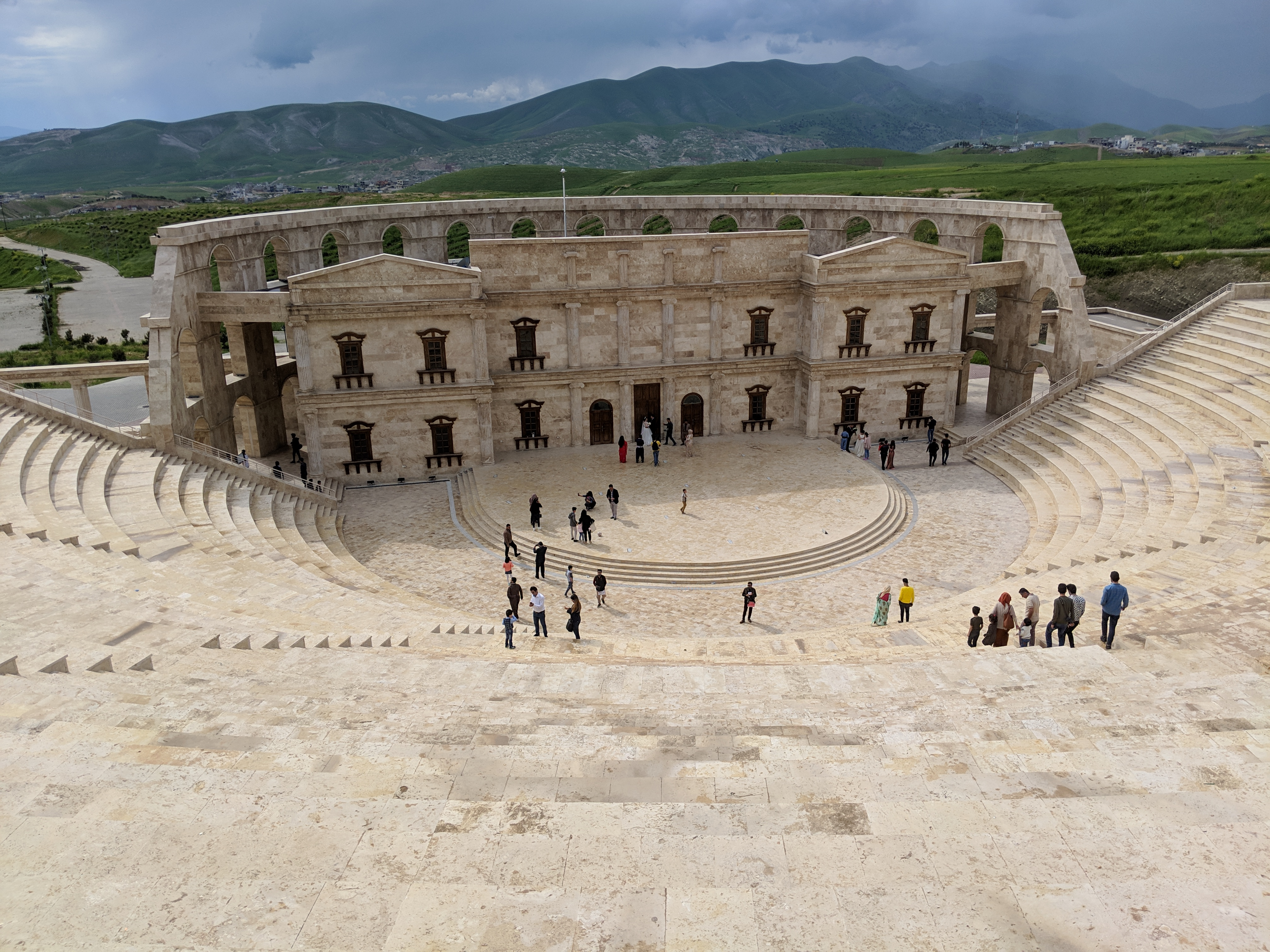
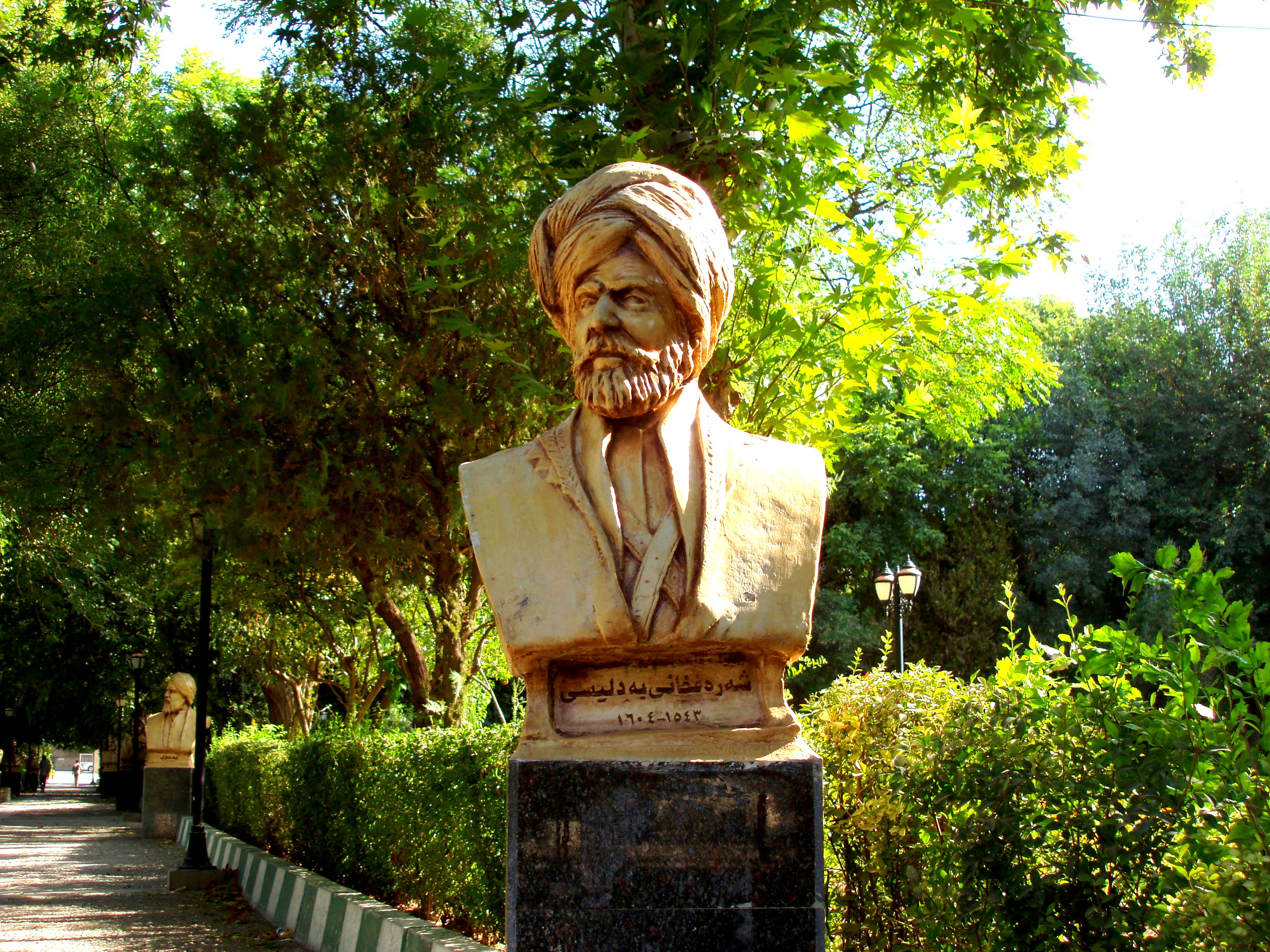
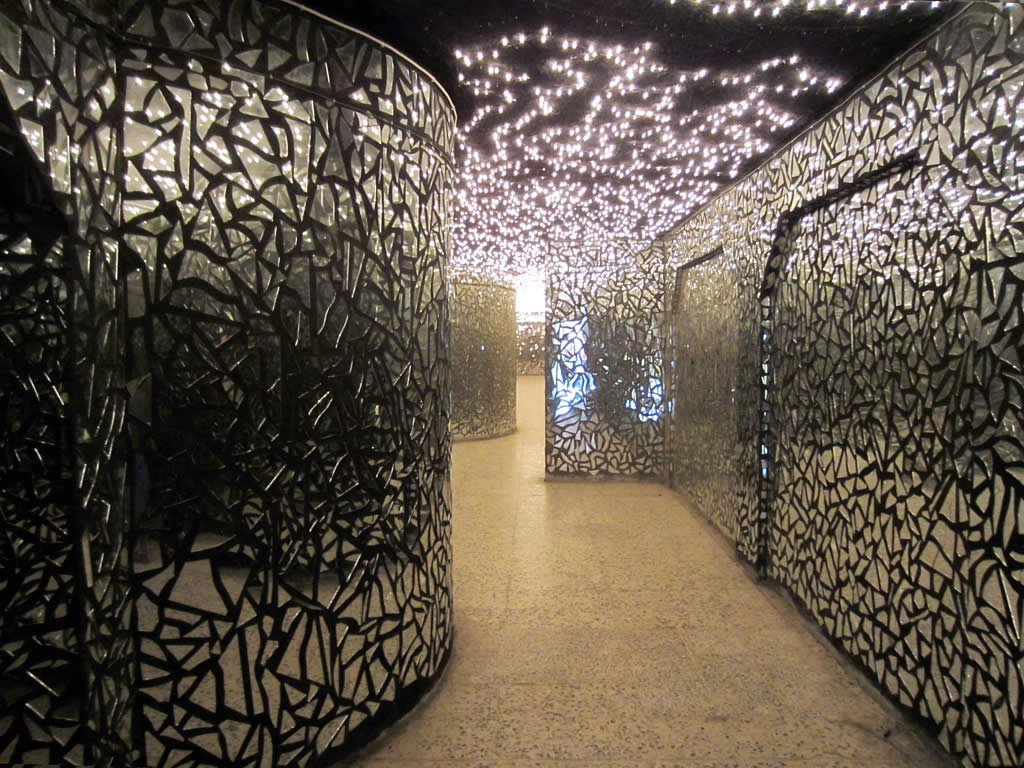
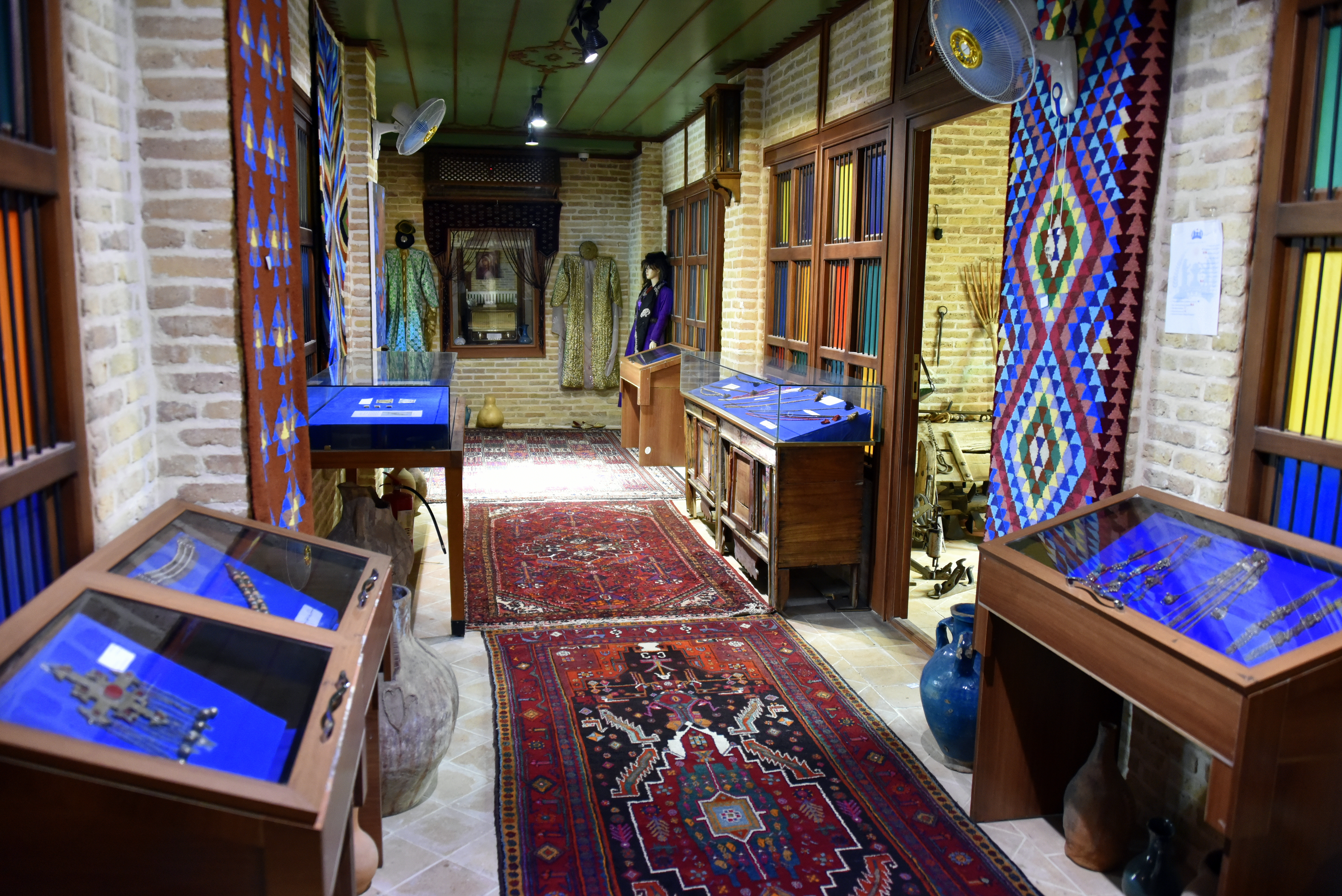
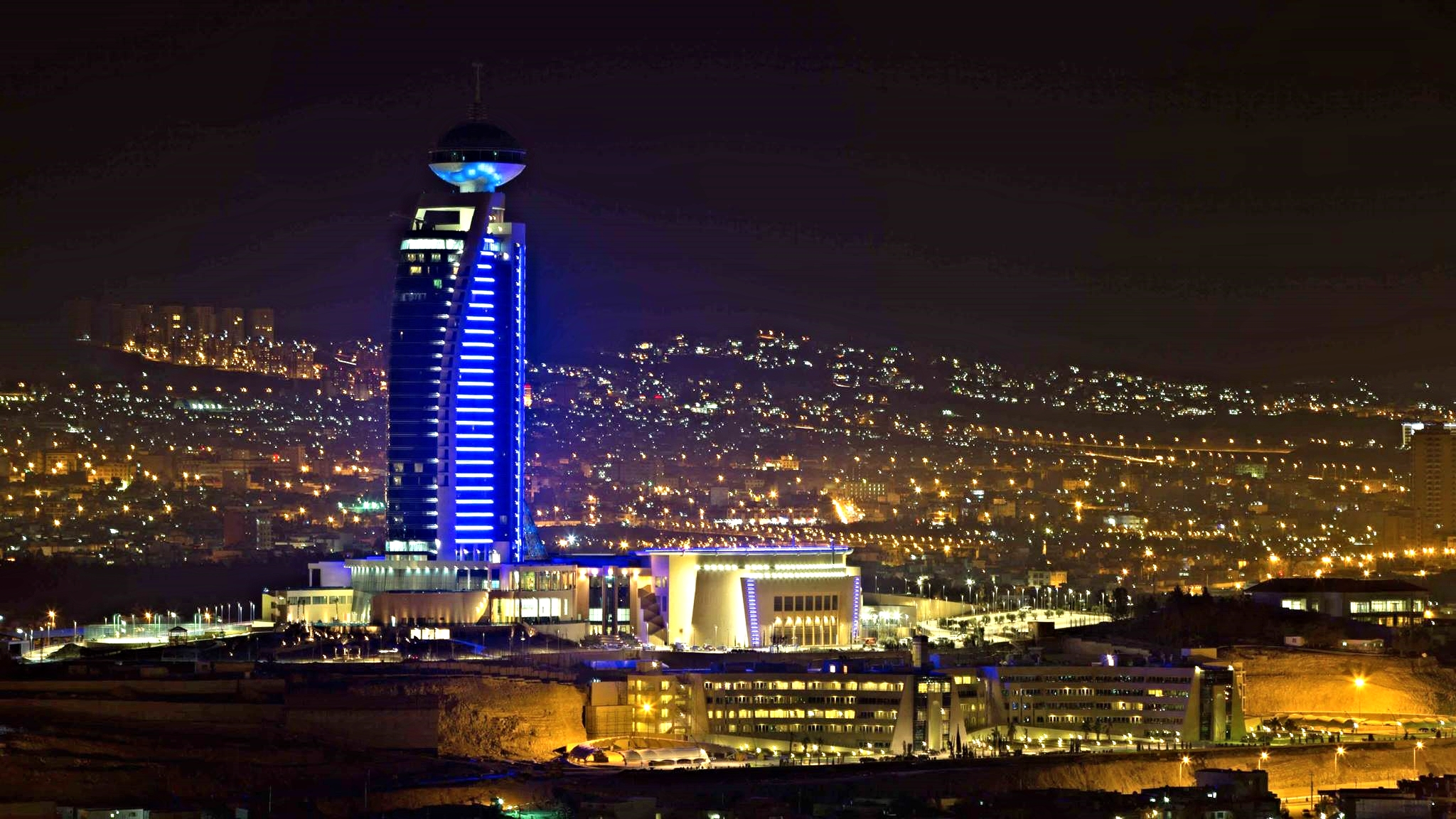
- Top-bottom, R-L: View over Suleymaniyah; Roman-styled theater • Sharafkhan Bidlisi statue Amna Suraka Museum • Sulaymaniyah Museum; Suleymaniyah at night

- Location in Iraq
- Coordinates: 35°33′26″N 45°26′08″E
- Country: Iraq
- Federal region: Kurdistan Region
- Governorate: Sulaymaniyah
- District: Sulaymaniyah

Government
  - Type: Municipality
  - Mayor: Leyla Omer

Area
  - Total: 266 km^{2} (103 sq mi)
- Elevation: 882 m (2,895 ft)

Population
  - Estimate (2025): 847,000
  - Rank: 8th in Iraq
  - Density: 3,200/km^{2} (8,300/sq mi)
- Time zone: UTC+3 (AST)
- Website: https://slemani.gov.krd/

Sulaymaniyah (Arabic: السليمانية, romanized: as-Sulaymāniyyah) or Slemani (Kurdish: سلێمانی, romanized: Silêmanî), is a city in the east of the Kurdistan Region of Iraq and is the capital of the Sulaymaniyah Governorate. It is surrounded by the Azmar, Goizha and Qaiwan Mountains in the northeast, Baranan Mountain in the south and the Tasluja Hills in the west.

The modern city of Slemani was founded in 1784 by the Ottoman-Kurdish prince Ibrahim Pasha Baban in Collaboration with Azim Beg and Haji Aziz Bey Aghal Dwanze Swarey Meriwane Jawamer Agha Rangena, who named it after his father Sulayman Pasha. Slemani was the capital of the historic Kurdish principality of Baban from 1784 to 1850.

== History ==
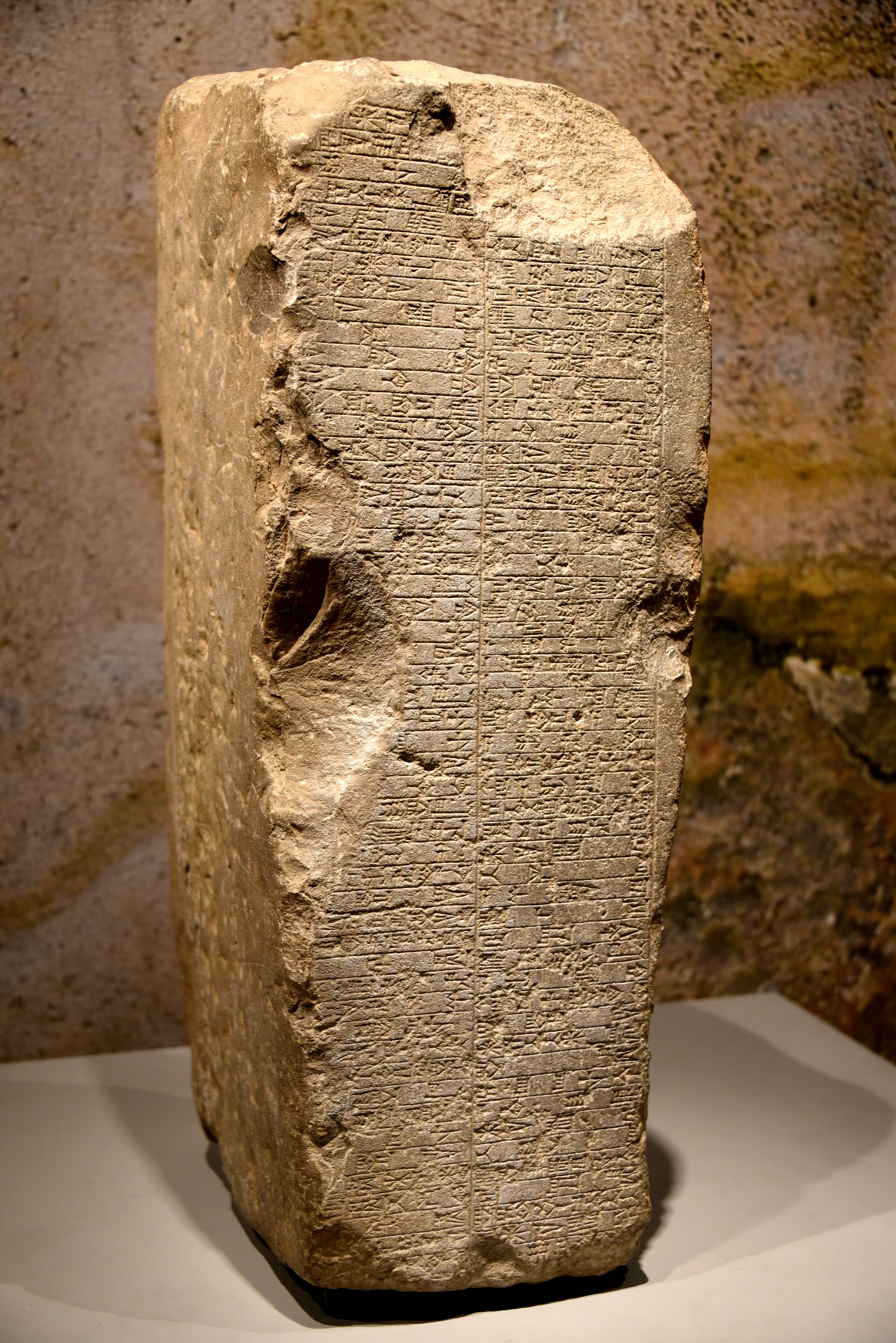
Stela of Iddi-Sin, King of Simurrum. It dates back to the Old Babylonian Period. From Qarachatan Village, Slemani Governorate, Iraqi Kurdistan. Located in the Slemani Museum, Iraq.

The region of Slemani was known as Zamwa prior to the foundation of the modern city in 1784. The capital of the Kurdish Baban principality (1649–1850), before Slemani, was a territory named "Qelaçiwalan". At the time of the Babani's rule there were major conflicts between the Safavid dynasty and the Ottoman Empire. Qelaçiwalan became a battleground for the two rivals.

In 1783, Ibrahim Baban became ruler of the emirate and began the reconstruction of a city which once constructed by Ottoman Sultan Sulayman (the name of Sulaymaniyah came from his name) new city which would become its capital. In 1784 he finished erecting a number of palaces for trade called Qeyserîs and bazaars, which were also used as baths, and began inviting people from the surrounding villages and emirates to move to the newly established city. Soon Melkendî, which was originally intended to be the city itself, instead became one of its quarters. The new city of Slemani was named after Sulayman Baba, who was the first Baban prince to gain control of the province of Şarezûr. Sulayman Baban invaded the neighboring Kurdish vassaldom of Ardalan, defeating their forces in 1694. Ottoman Sultan Mustafa II assigned him the district of Baban.

Haji Aziz Bey Aghal Dwanze Swarey Meriwane Jawamer Agha Rangena is not to be confused with the royal and aristocratic Jwamer Agha, although they share family ties through marriage. He was the billionaire Bey of the noble and aristocratic Kurdish Noori-Aghal family, who founded the city of Slemani in collaboration with Ibrahim Pasha Baban and Azim Beg. Ibrahim Pasha Baban invited Haji to help build Slemani, and together, they founded the city of Sarkarez.

Haji Aziz Bey Aghal was the first individual to establish a cemetery in Slemani, using his land, which had originally been designated for sumac cultivation. Aghal asserted that he had no intention of generating profit, stating that his personal wealth was sufficient to support the impoverished. He further demonstrated his altruistic nature by opening the doors of his palace, allowing the poor to take whatever they needed. He provided them with nuts, chicken, rice, and other food items that were typically consumed by the aristocracy of his era.

Additionally, he constructed the first bridge in Slemani, testing its stability by riding his horse across it. He expressed indifference to his own safety, stating that if he were to perish due to the bridge's collapse, it would serve as a testament to its inadequacy and raise awareness among the citizens. He also built the first mosque in Slemani, which is currently in poor condition, but has "Aghal" written on its walls.

The house was later sold and converted into a car park by the buyer, a decision that drew criticism from many older Kurds who had known him and disapproved of the change. Despite his death, Haji Aziz Bey Aghal is still highly respected as a nobleman. Many peasants offered to convert to his religion for his actions, but he refused, stating that he did not need any recognition and was content with everything he had. He was also offered royal titles, but he turned them down.

His wife, the noblewoman Princess Fatima Khanum, sold all her gold including her belongings to support her husband in saving hundreds of thousands of peasants with his wealth during the First World War. For their acts of charity, they are buried together in a sacred private grave on the sumac farm.

According to Jewish tradition, Sulaiman Baban emphasized the importance of a town having Jewish residents for its completeness. A mission was then sent to Qaradagh, a town with a thriving Jewish community, and surrounding villages. The Jews of Qaradagh responded by sending the first group of Jewish inhabitants to Sulaymaniyah.

In the early 1800s refugees from Ardalan moved to Slemani, including Mastura Ardalan, the widow of Xosraw Xanî Erdalan, the ruler of the kingdom. Erdalan wrote an account of Kurdish history in Persian and was buried in Slemani when he died in 1848.

From 1922 to 1924, Slemani was the capital of the Kingdom of Kurdistan, a short-lived unrecognized state declared by Iraqi Kurds following the collapse of the Ottoman Empire.

== Demographics ==
The early 1920s Iraqi Revolt against the British rule of the Mandate for Mesopotamia led by Shaikh Mahmud triggered a wave of Jewish emigration from Sulaymaniyah.

According to Iraqi government documents, by 1947 the number of residents had increased to 23,475. In the same year, records documented the existence of three hundred Jewish families, comprising a total of 1,517 individuals. Notably, nearly the entire Jewish community, except for one family, immigrated to the newly established State of Israel between 1951 and 1952.

By 1998, the local population was estimated at 548,747, which grew in 2015 to an estimated 656,100.

The American University of Iraq, Sulaimani estimated the number of inhabitants in 2016 at 800,000.

== Geography and climate ==
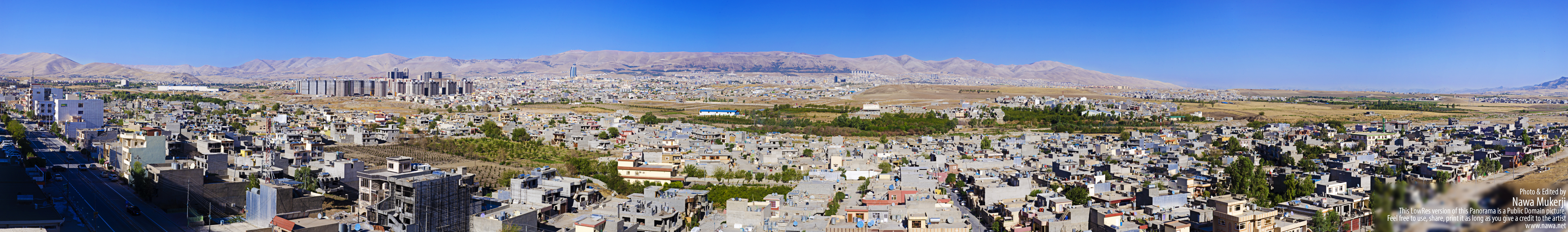
Panorama of Sulaymaniyah, September 2015

The city is located in Northern Iraq. Of the main population centres in the country, it is characterized by its cooler summer temperatures and its rainier winters. Average temperatures range from 0 to 39 °C (32–102 °F). In the winters, there can be a significant amount of snow. Snow falls every year or two.

The Köppen-Geiger climate classification system classifies its climate as a hot-summer Mediterranean climate (Csa).

Climate data for Sulaymaniyah (2012–2023 normals)
| Month | Jan | Feb | Mar | Apr | May | Jun | Jul | Aug | Sep | Oct | Nov | Dec | Year |
|---|---|---|---|---|---|---|---|---|---|---|---|---|---|
| Mean daily maximum °C (°F) | 11.2 (52.2) | 13.6 (56.5) | 17.6 (63.7) | 23.6 (74.5) | 30.4 (86.7) | 37.6 (99.7) | 41.3 (106.3) | 39.2 (102.6) | 35.4 (95.7) | 28.6 (83.5) | 19.1 (66.4) | 13.3 (55.9) | 25.9 (78.6) |
| Daily mean °C (°F) | 5.3 (41.5) | 7.1 (44.8) | 10.8 (51.4) | 15.6 (60.1) | 21.6 (70.9) | 27.8 (82.0) | 31.7 (89.1) | 30.2 (86.4) | 25.7 (78.3) | 19.8 (67.6) | 12.4 (54.3) | 7.6 (45.7) | 18.0 (64.3) |
| Mean daily minimum °C (°F) | −0.6 (30.9) | 0.6 (33.1) | 4.1 (39.4) | 7.6 (45.7) | 12.7 (54.9) | 18.1 (64.6) | 22.1 (71.8) | 21.3 (70.3) | 16.1 (61.0) | 11.0 (51.8) | 5.8 (42.4) | 1.8 (35.2) | 10.0 (50.1) |
| Average precipitation mm (inches) | 107.2 (4.22) | 118.5 (4.67) | 129.4 (5.09) | 65.1 (2.56) | 22.5 (0.89) | 0.5 (0.02) | 0.0 (0.0) | 0.2 (0.01) | 1.5 (0.06) | 41.0 (1.61) | 109.3 (4.30) | 126.9 (5.00) | 722.0 (28.43) |
| Average precipitation days (≥ 1.0 mm) | 11.6 | 9.6 | 14.1 | 11.1 | 11.1 | 5.9 | 0.9 | 0.1 | 1.0 | 0.5 | 5.3 | 9.0 | 80.2 |
| Average snowy days | 1.9 | 1.1 | 0.1 | 0 | 0 | 0 | 0 | 0 | 0 | 0 | 0 | 0.9 | 4 |
| Average relative humidity (%) | 75.7 | 70.5 | 70.5 | 64.3 | 47.2 | 23.2 | 19.0 | 19.2 | 23.8 | 39.4 | 64.8 | 76.3 | 49.5 |
| Average dew point °C (°F) | −1 (30) | 0 (32) | 2 (36) | 4 (39) | 5 (41) | 3 (37) | 4 (39) | 4 (39) | 2 (36) | 2 (36) | 1 (34) | 2 (36) | 2 (36) |
| Mean monthly sunshine hours | 164.3 | 175.2 | 213.9 | 237.0 | 316.2 | 408.0 | 418.5 | 396.8 | 351.0 | 272.8 | 207.0 | 167.4 | 3,328.1 |
| Mean daily sunshine hours | 5.3 | 6.2 | 6.9 | 7.9 | 10.2 | 13.6 | 13.5 | 12.8 | 11.7 | 8.8 | 6.9 | 5.4 | 9.1 |
| Mean daily daylight hours | 10.5 | 11.4 | 12.4 | 13.6 | 14.5 | 15.0 | 14.8 | 13.9 | 12.8 | 11.7 | 10.7 | 10.3 | 12.6 |
Source 1: IEM KRSO (precipitation 2012–2021, precipitation days 2014–2021 and snow 2013–2021)
Source 2: Weatherbase (daylight-dew point), Weather2visit(sun)

== Education ==
The University of Sulaimani was opened in 1968 with instruction in Kurdish, Arabic, and English. It has faculties in engineering, agriculture, the arts, science, and medicine. It is the largest university in the Kurdistan Region. A second university, Sulaimani Polytechnic University was established in 2012, also teaching in Kurdish, English and Arabic.

In 2007 American University of Iraq, Sulaimani, (AUI-S) was a new addition to the American universities in the Middle East, graduating its fifth class in 2016. Instruction at this private, not-for-profit liberal arts university is in English only, featuring a US-accredited program in English as a Second Language (ESL). There are a number of other private universities.

== Culture ==
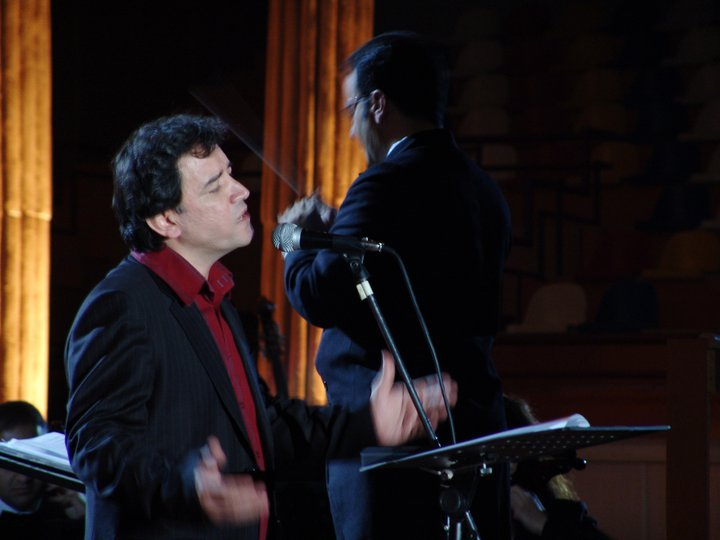
Adnan Karim in a joint concert with the Iraqi National Symphony Orchestra conducted by the renowned Kurdish composer A.J. Sagerma performing classical Kurdish music

Two independent newspapers Hawlati and Awena and two independent political magazines Lvin and Shock, are published and distributed in Slemani city. Since 2016, there exists an International Film Festival in the city which is organized by the College of Fine Arts of the University of Sulaymanya.

Slemani is the only city in South Kurdistan that regularly celebrates World Music Day or Fête de la Musique. In one trip to the city, a journalist working for the BBC wrote about Slemani's distinct culture:"Culture is hugely important to the Kurdish people, especially in Slemani, but there is a strong pull to the west—modernisation and consumerism—driven perhaps by the satellite televisions they have had access to since they started running their own affairs...And at the university, students mill around the campus, chattering with each other and doing some last-minute cramming for their exams. The war only stopped lectures for a few weeks. There are probably more women than men and they are happy to air their views to anyone who asks."

Slemani was the home of poets such as Nalî, Mahwi, and Piramerd.

== Economy ==
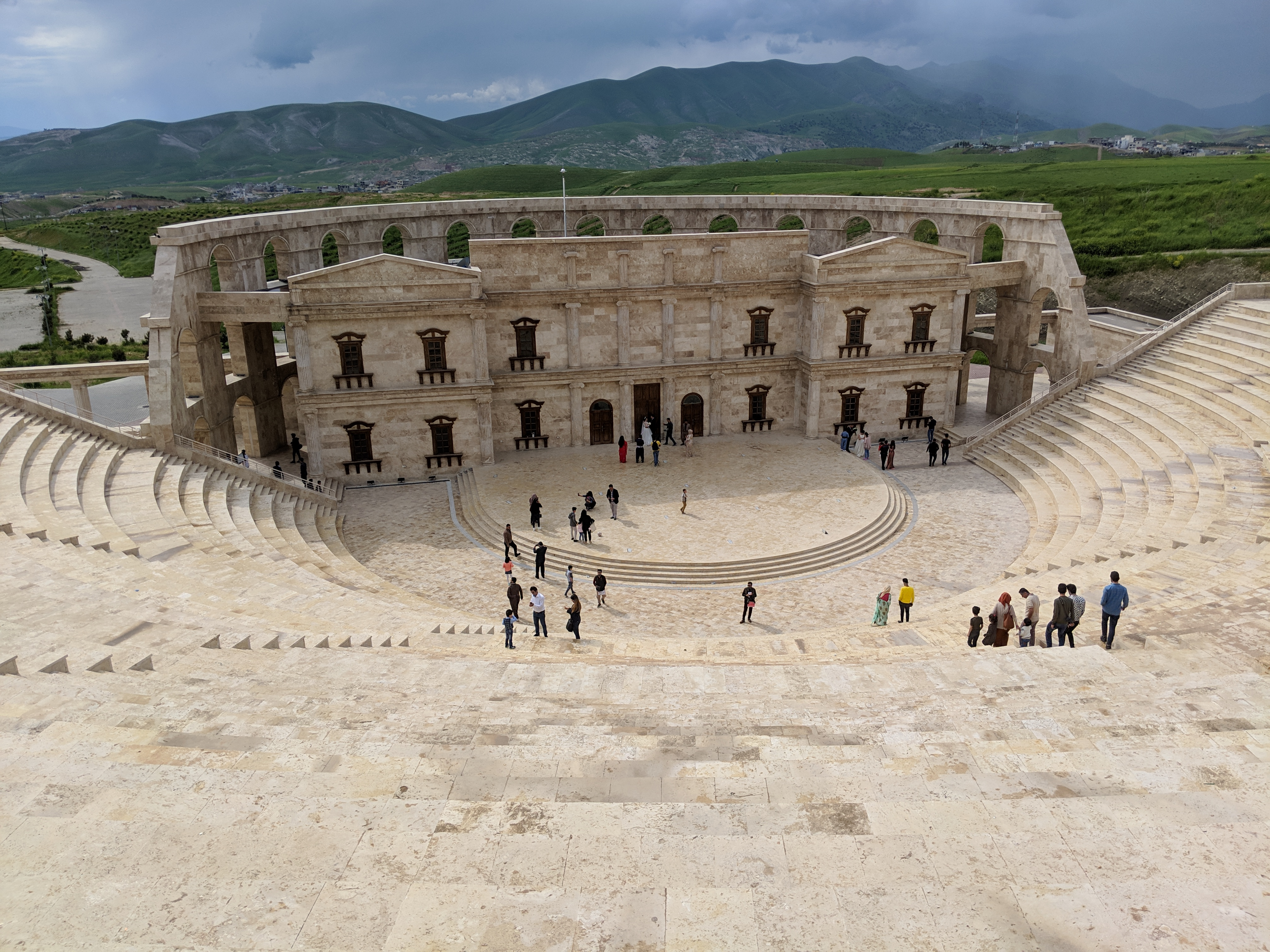
Roman amphitheater in Slemani, important tourist attraction in the city

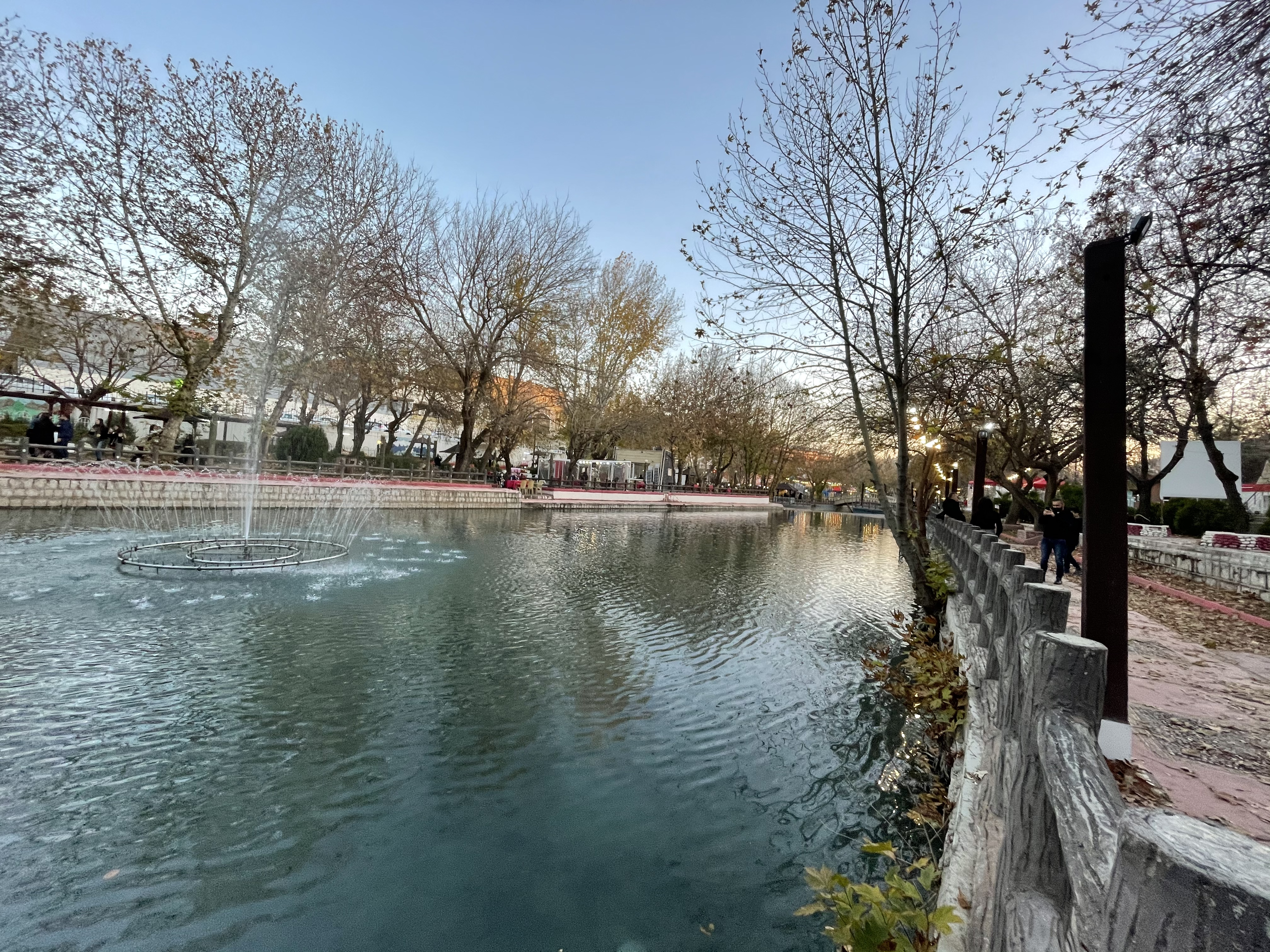
Sarchnar Park

Since 2003, Slemani has experienced a growing local economy. Its economy today relies on tourism, agriculture and a number of small factories, most of which are involved in the building trade.

In 2004 the Comprehensive Food Security and Vulnerability Analysis in Iraq released an in-depth survey of the Slemani Governorate in which they surveyed each city. In this survey, one can see the economic boom of 2003 mentioned earlier.

=== Tourism ===
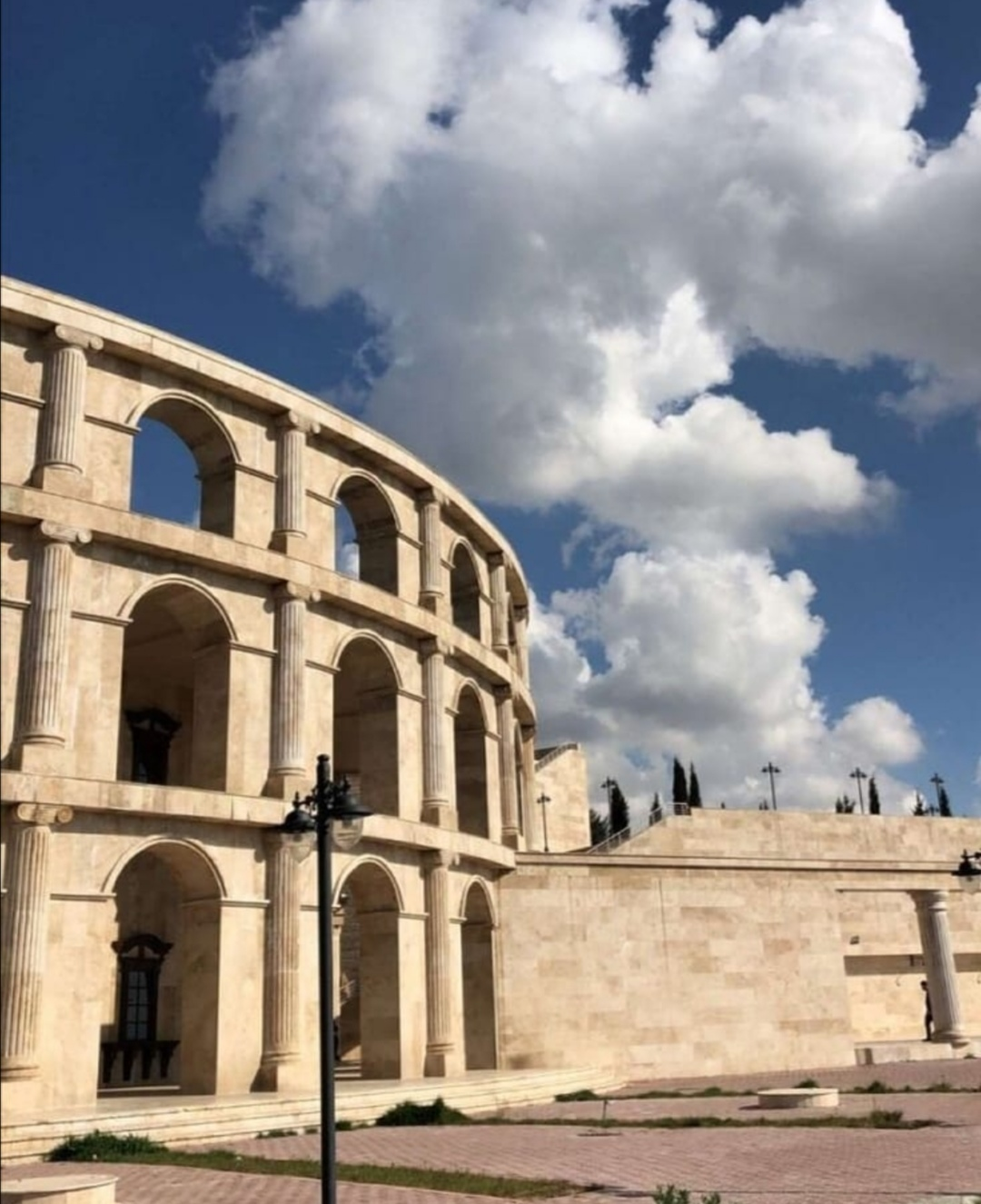
Hewari Shar Park

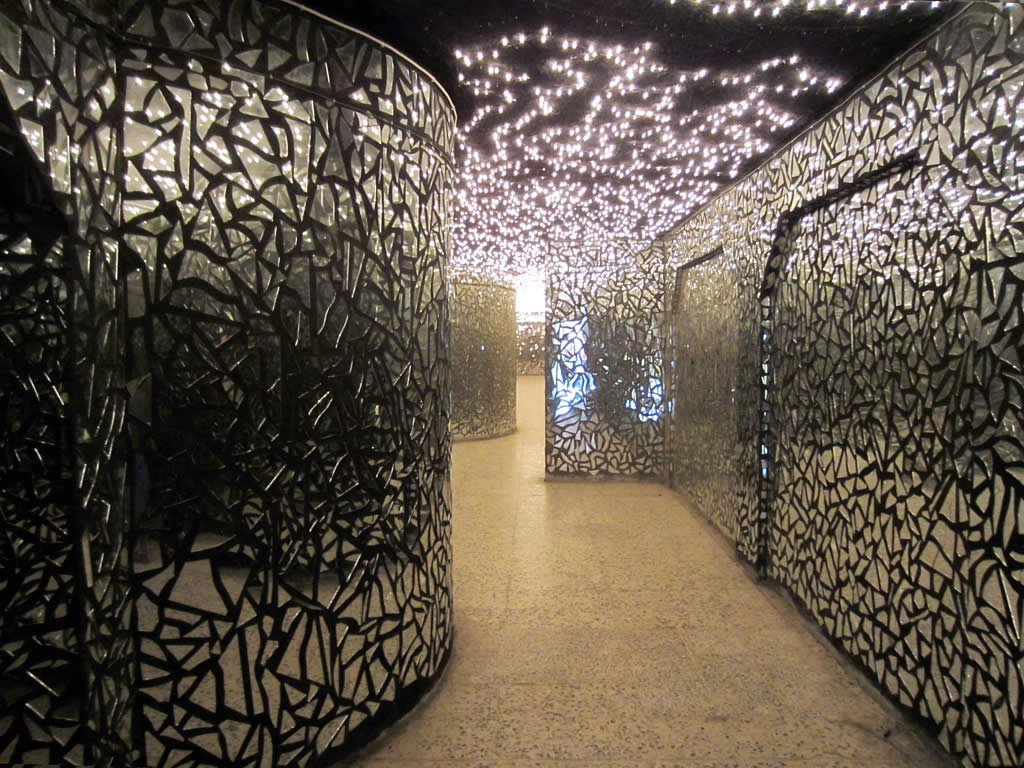
Victims of the Anfal campaign are represented by broken glass and tiny lights at the Amna Suraka museum in Slemani

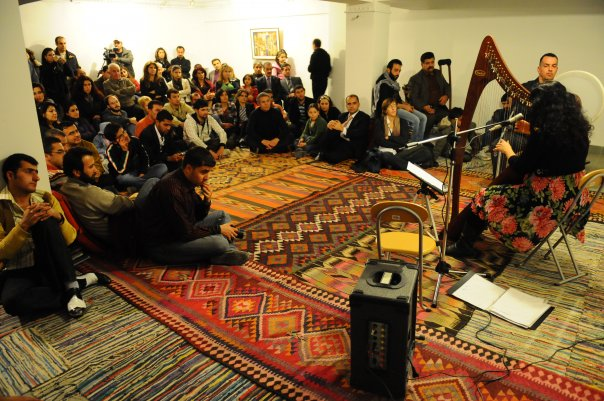
Kurdish artist Tara Jaff playing the Harp during a cultural gathering at Aram Gallery

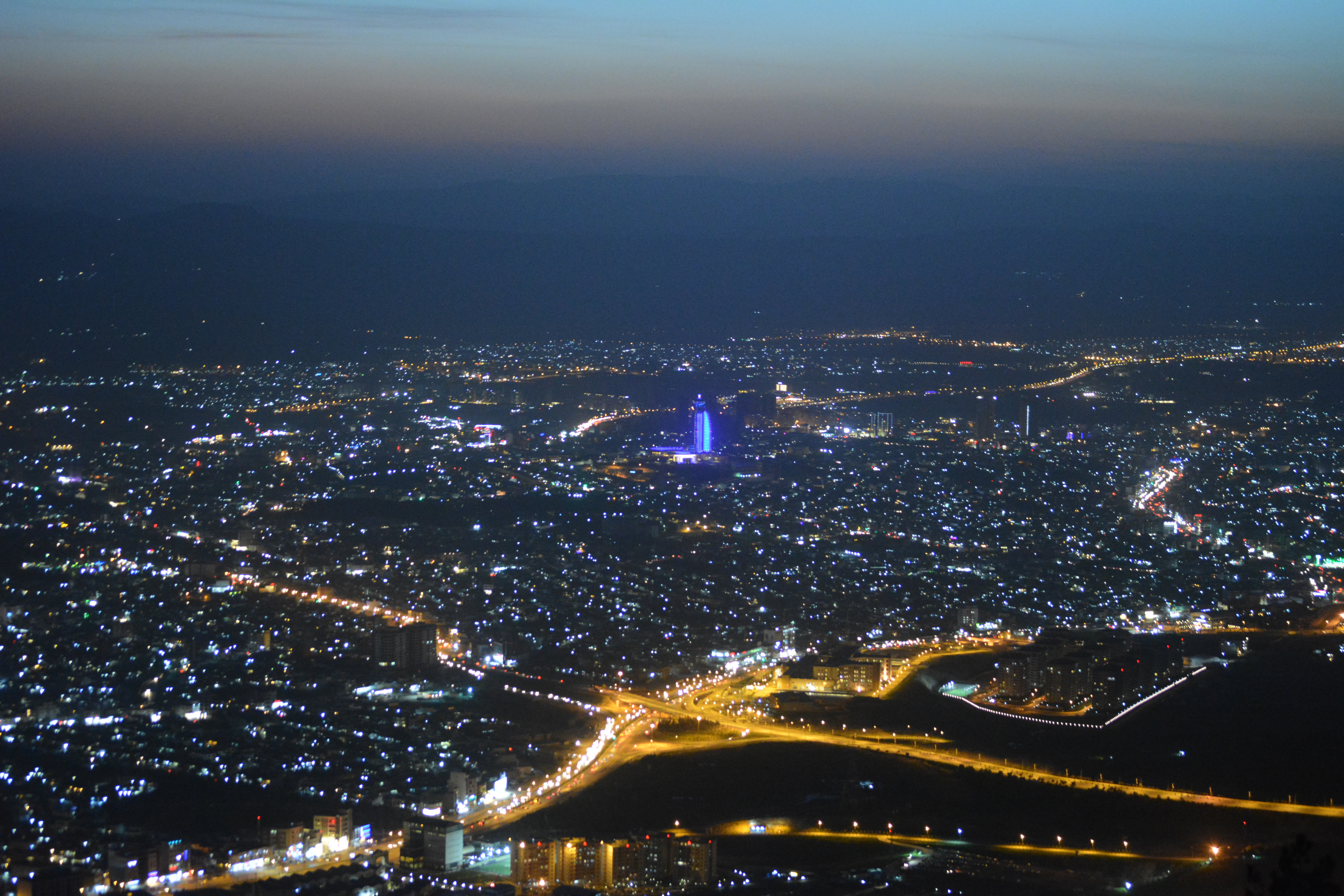
Slemani at Night at the Top of Azmar Mountain

The city was visited by more than 60,000 tourists in 2009. Slemani attracted more than 15,000 Iranian tourists in the first quarter of 2010, many drawn by the fact it is not subject to strict laws faced at home. Newroz 2010 drew an exodus of Iranian tourists choosing to celebrate the event in the region.

=== Museums ===
- Sulaimani Museum: It is the second biggest museum after the national museum in Baghdad. It is home to many Mesopotamian, Kurdish and ancient Persian artifacts dating back to 1792–1750 BC.
- Amna Suraka museum
- Museum of Modern Art (Mozehanai Hunari Howchah)
- Sulaimani Archeological Museum

== Notable people ==
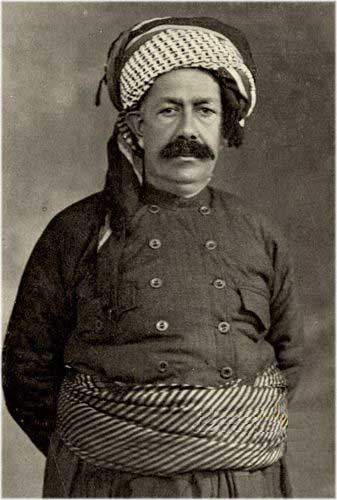
Mahmud Barzanji

- Khâlid-i Baghdâdî (1779–1827), sufist and Islamic thinker
- Salim (1800–1866), poet
- Nalî (1800–1873), poet
- Saeb (1854–1910), poet
- Mahwi (1830–1906), poet
- Said Pasha Kurd, (1834–1907), Ottoman statesman
- Şerif Pasha, (1865–1951), Ottoman diplomat, ambassador and statesman
- Mustafa Yamulki (1866–1936), Minister of Education in the Kingdom of Kurdistan
- Haji Mala Saeed Kirkukli Zada (1866–1937), Minister of Justice in the Kingdom of Kurdistan
- Piramerd Tawfeq Mahmoud Hamza, (1867–1950), poet and journalist
- Mevlanzade Rifat Bey, (1869–1930), journalist and politician
- Muhamed Amin Zaki (1880–1948), historian, statesman and politician
- Taufiq Wahby (1891–1984), linguist, politician and poet
- Sheikh Nuri Sheikh Salih Sheikh Ghani Barzinji (1896–1958), journalist and poet
- Ahmad Mukhtar Baban (1900–1976), prime Minister of Iraq 1958
- Abdulla Goran (1904–1962), founder of modern Kurdish poetry
- Ibrahim Ahmad (1914–2000), novelist, poet and translator
- Jamal Nebez (1933–2018), Kurdish linguist, mathematician, politician, author, translator and writer.
- Nawshirwan Mustafa (1944–2017), politician, historian and media proprietor
- Barham Salih, 8th president of Iraq
- Ahmad Hardi (1922–2006), poet
- Sherko Bekas (1940–2013), contemporary poet
- Bachtyar Ali (born 1960), novelist
- Muhamad Salih Dilan (1927–1990), musician and poet
- Shahab Sheikh Nuri (1932–1976), politician
- Dilshad Meriwani (1947–1989), actor, poet, writer and journalist
- Karzan Kardozi, (born 1983) Filmmaker and writer
- Rizgar Mohammed Amin (born 1958), judge
- Mahmoud Othman (born 1938), politician
- Nozad Saleh Rifaat (born 1941), physician and politician
- Jalal Talabani (1933–2017), 6th president of Iraq
- Mahir Hassan (born 1963), actor and playwright
- Shwan Kamal (born 1967), artist
- Sara Omar (born 1986), novelist
- Simko Ahmed (born 1972), artist

== Sites ==
- Tomb of king Cyaxares of Media, Qyzqapan

== Politics ==
In recent years, many people in Sulaymaniyah have distanced themselves from Kurdish nationalism as the Kurdistan Workers Party is experiencing a surge.

== Twin towns – sister cities ==
- (United States) Tucson, Arizona

== Transportation ==
The city is served by Sulaimaniyah International Airport, with service on many commercial airlines, including Iraqi, Qatar Airways, Royal Jordanian and Turkish Airlines.

== See also ==
- List of largest cities of Iraq
- 2011 Kurdish protests in Iraq
- Chaldean Catholic Archeparchy of Kirkuk-Sulaimaniya (former Eastern Catholic diocese)
- Duhok
- Dohuk Governorate
- Erbil
- Erbil Governorate
- Kurdistan
- Kurds
- Ranya
- Saray Azadi
- Slemani Governorate
- Sulaymaniyah Museum
