= Kurd (disambiguation) =

The Kurds are an ethnic group in Western Asia.

Kurd may also refer to:

== Places ==
- Kord-e Olya, Iran, a village also known as Kurd
- Kord-e Sofla, Iran, a village also known as Kurd
- Kurd, Hungary, a village
- Kurd Mountains, a highland region in Syria and Turkey
- Kürd (disambiguation), several places in Azerbaijan

== Other uses ==
- Kūrd, a Brahui tribe of Pakistan
- Kurd (name), a given name and surname, including a list of people with this name
- Uppsala Kurd FK, a defunct Swedish football club based in Uppsala

== See also ==
- Curd (disambiguation)
- Kurdi (disambiguation)
- Kord, Iran
