= Curd (disambiguation) =

Curd is a dairy product obtained by curdling milk.

Curd may also refer to:

== Food ==
- Bean curd, a product derived from soyabeans
- Cheese curd, a type of particulate cheese
- Curd snack, a type of sweet snack made from curd cheese
- Curd (India), homemade yogurt of the Indian subcontinent
  - Curd rice, a dish from India using unsweetened homemade yogurt
- Fruit curd, a type of dessert spread made of fruit
- Pig blood curd, a coagulated pig's blood food product
- Quark (dairy product), a dairy product also known as "curd cheese"
- The head of a cauliflower

== People ==
- Blake Curd (born 1967), American politician in South Dakota
- Freed Curd (1933–2007), American politician in Kentucky
- Martin Curd, American philosopher and associate professor
- Ted Curd (born 2006), English footballer
- Curd Duca (born 1955), Austrian musician
- Curd Jürgens (1915–1982), German-Austrian stage and film actor

== Other uses ==
- Curd fruit, a fruit

== See also ==
- Curdled (film)
- Curdling
- Curds and whey (disambiguation)
- Kurd (disambiguation)
