= Güdəyli =

Güdəyli is a village in the municipality of Kurd Eldarbeyli in the Ismailli District of Azerbaijan.
