= Leyla Omer =

Kurdish politician (born 1975)

- لەیلا عومەر

Mayor of Sulaymaniyah
- Incumbent
- Assumed office February 10, 2022
- Appointed by: Sulaymaniyah Provincial Council
- Preceded by: Twana Kamal Jalal

Deputy Governor of Sulaymaniyah
- In office January 31, 2021 – February 10, 2022
- Appointed by: Sulaymaniyah Provincial Council
- Governor: Haval Abubakir
- Preceded by: Omar Qaladzaiye
- Succeeded by: Shaho Osman

Personal details
- Born: 1975 Sulaymaniyah, Ba'athist Iraq
- Party: Patriotic Union of Kurdistan
- Education: Law Degree at the Salahaddin University - Erbil (BA)
- Occupation: Politician
- Profession: Lawyer

Leyla Omer Ali (Sorani Kurdish: لەیلا عومەر عەلی) (born 1975) is a Kurdish politician who has served as the Mayor of Sulaymaniyah since February 10, 2022. Prior to her appointment as mayor, she served as the Deputy Governor of Sulaymaniyah.

== Early Life and Education ==
Omer was born in 1975 in Sulaymaniyah, Ba'athist Iraq. She received a Law Degree from Salahaddin University-Erbil - College of Law in 1996.

== Career ==
Prior to senior political positions, Omer was employed in the Eastern Sulaymaniyah Real Estate Registration Directorate in 1997. 3 years later in 2000, she was elected as the Deputy Director of the directorate. 5 years later in 2005, she was elected as Director of the Eastern Sulaymaniyah Real Estate Registration Directorate.

Omer is an active member of the Patriotic Union of Kurdistan (PUK) and in 2019 she was elected in the PUK Leadership Council.

=== Deputy Governor of Sulaymaniyah ===
On July 28, 2020, the Sulaymaniyah Provincial Council in a meeting voted on the change of multiple positions. One being the Deputy Governor due to the retirement of the incumbent Deputy Governor at the time, Omar Qaladzaiye. in the election, 27 members of the council voted to elect Leyla Omer as the successor. She was designated for Deputy Governor and in January 31 2021 She assumed office as the Deputy Governor of Sulaymaniyah being the first women in history to hold the position.

=== Mayor of Sulaymaniyah ===
On January 18, 2022, the Ministry of Interior of the Kurdistan Regional Government (KRG) decided to change the position of Leyla Omer from the Deputy Governor of Sulaymaniyah Governorate to the Mayor of Sulaymaniyah City. On February 10, 2022, she assumed office as the Mayor of Sulaymaniyah. Sulaymaniyah has had over 50 mayors since 1890 and Leyla Omer was the first woman to be elected as the mayor of Sulaymaniyah.
