= Şerif Pasha =

Kurdish Ottoman diplomat

Mehmed Şerif Pasha
- President of the Kurd Delegation to the Paris Peace Conference
- Born: 15 October 1865; Constantinople, Ottoman Empire
- Died: 22 December 1951 (aged 86); Catanzaro, Italy
- Burial: Catanzaro Cemetery
- Spouse: Princess Emine Halim of Egypt
- Father: Kurd Said Pasha
- Mother: Saded Hanim
- Religion: Sunni Muslim
- Occupation: Diplomat, soldier, journalist, politician

Mehmed Şerif Pasha (1865 – 22 December 1951) was a founding member of Kurd Society for Cooperation and Progress and representative of the Society for the Elevation of Kurdistan to the Paris Peace Conference (1919–1920). He was a leading Kurdish nationalist.

== Family ==
He was the son of Said Pasha Kurd, nephew of Kurd Ahmet Izzet Pasha and Mustafa Yamulki, brother of Kurd Fuad Pasha and brother in law of Said Halim Pasha, and cousin of Abdul Aziz Yamulki. He was descended from a noble Kurdish family of the Emirate of Baban.

== Early life and career ==
Sherif Pasha was the Ottoman Ambassador to Stockholm between 1898 and 1908 and the second documented Kurd in Sweden, Sherif Pasha lived in Sweden for ten years.

== Young Turk Revolution ==
Before 1908 Sherif Pasha was a supporter of the Young Turk movement and provided economic support to Ahmed Riza, a young Turk leader in Paris. After the 1908 Revolution he returned to the Ottoman Empire and headed up the Committee of Union and Progress (CUP) branch in the Istanbul district of Pangaltı.

However, he soon fell out with the CUP. The reasons for this are debated. According to Sherif Pasha and his supporters, he was concerned with the role of the military in politics. However, his detractors claim that he had been angered by the fact that he had not been appointed the Porte's Representative London. He exposed and opposed the CUP's Turkist programme and its desire to mobilise all available means to assimilate or Turkify the empire's non Turkish nations. Günter Behrendt states that he was a follower of Sultan Abdul Hamid II. After the Young Turk Revolution in 1908, the CUP actually wanted to sentence to death for his opposition to their views, but Şerif Pasha was aware that the situation was difficult for him and he fled into exile abroad before he could be apprehended.

== Early Kurd activities ==
In 1908, he co-founded the Kurd Society for Cooperation and Progress in Constantinople together with Emin Ali Bedir Khan and Abdulkadir Ubeydullah.

== Leader of the Ottoman opposition in exile (1909–1914) ==
He again left the Empire and helped to found a number of reformist liberal opposition parties. He articulated strong opposition through a newspaper in Paris entitled Meşrutiyet (Constitutionalism). Due to his oppositional stances, the CUP accused him of being involved into the murder of the former Ottoman Grand Vizier Mahmud Shevket Pasha. He was sentenced to death in absentia in June 1913. failed assassination attempt on him in 1914.

== World War I (1914–1918) ==
In an article in The New York Times dated 10 October 1915, Şerif Pasha condemned the massacres on Armenians and declared that the Young Turk government had the intentions of "exterminating" the Armenians for a long time. Sherif Pasha remained in Monte Carlo throughout the Great War. In 1918, death sentence he was issued in June 1913, was overturned by the Government of Tevfik Pasha.

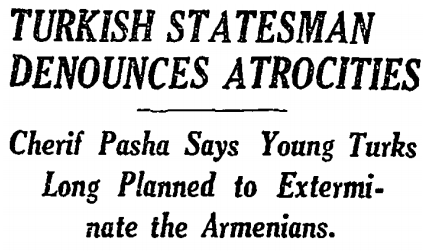
New York Times headline about Şerif Pasha denouncing the Armenian genocide carried out by the Young Turks during World War I

== Post World War I (1919–1920) ==
Sherif officially defected from the Ottoman side, and was elected president of the Kurdish delegation at the Paris Peace Conference by the Society for the Elevation of Kurdistan (Kürdistan Teali Cemiyeti) and as well at the Treaty of Sèvres.

He reached an agreement with the Armenian delegation headed by Boghos Nubar in Paris which involved the division of eastern Anatolia between a Kurdish and Armenian state. In this agreement Van and Bitlis both fell within Armenia, and so there was a hostile response from many Kurdish leaders in those region who had no wish to be a part of Armenia. Paris was subsequently bombarded with telegrams from the region condemning the accords.

Emin Ali Bedir Khan demanded his resignation from his post as a representative of the Kurds to which he then also agreed to.

== Leader of the Kurdish nation in exile (1920–1951) ==
After the failure of the Kurdish movement to achieve autonomy or independence for Kurdistan, Sherif Pasha remained in exile until his death. He moved to Cairo, where he had a property, which he received through the marriage with a member of the Khedivian family, Emine Halim, an aunt to King Faruk. In 1927 his daughter Melek Hanim was born in Monticiano, Siena. In the mid-1930s he lived in Monte Carlo, from where he attempted to gain support for the Kurdish cause from Benito Mussolini. He continued to lobby for an independent Kurdistan, during World War II he was in contact with British, Italian and German governments.

== Death ==
Sherif died of a heart attack on 22 December 1951 in his last place of exile Catanzaro, Calabria, Italy.

== See also ==
- Witnesses and testimonies of the Armenian genocide
