= Kürd, Jalilabad =

Kurd
- Azerbaijani: Kürd
- Location within Azerbaijan
- Coordinates: 40°00′37″N 48°50′05″E
- Country: Azerbaijan
- District: Jalilabad
- Time zone: UTC+4 (AZT)
  - Summer (DST): UTC+5 (AZT)

Kürd (also, Kurd) is a village in the Jalilabad District of Azerbaijan.
