= Kürd, Qabala =

Kurd
- Municipality
- Azerbaijani: Kürd
- Location within Azerbaijan
- Coordinates: 40°48′19″N 47°41′11″E
- Country: Azerbaijan
- District: Qabala

Population
  - Total: 1,335
- Time zone: UTC+4 (AZT)

Kürd (also, Kurd) is a village and municipality in the Qabala District of Azerbaijan. It has a population of 1,335.
