= Simko Ahmed =

Kurdish artist

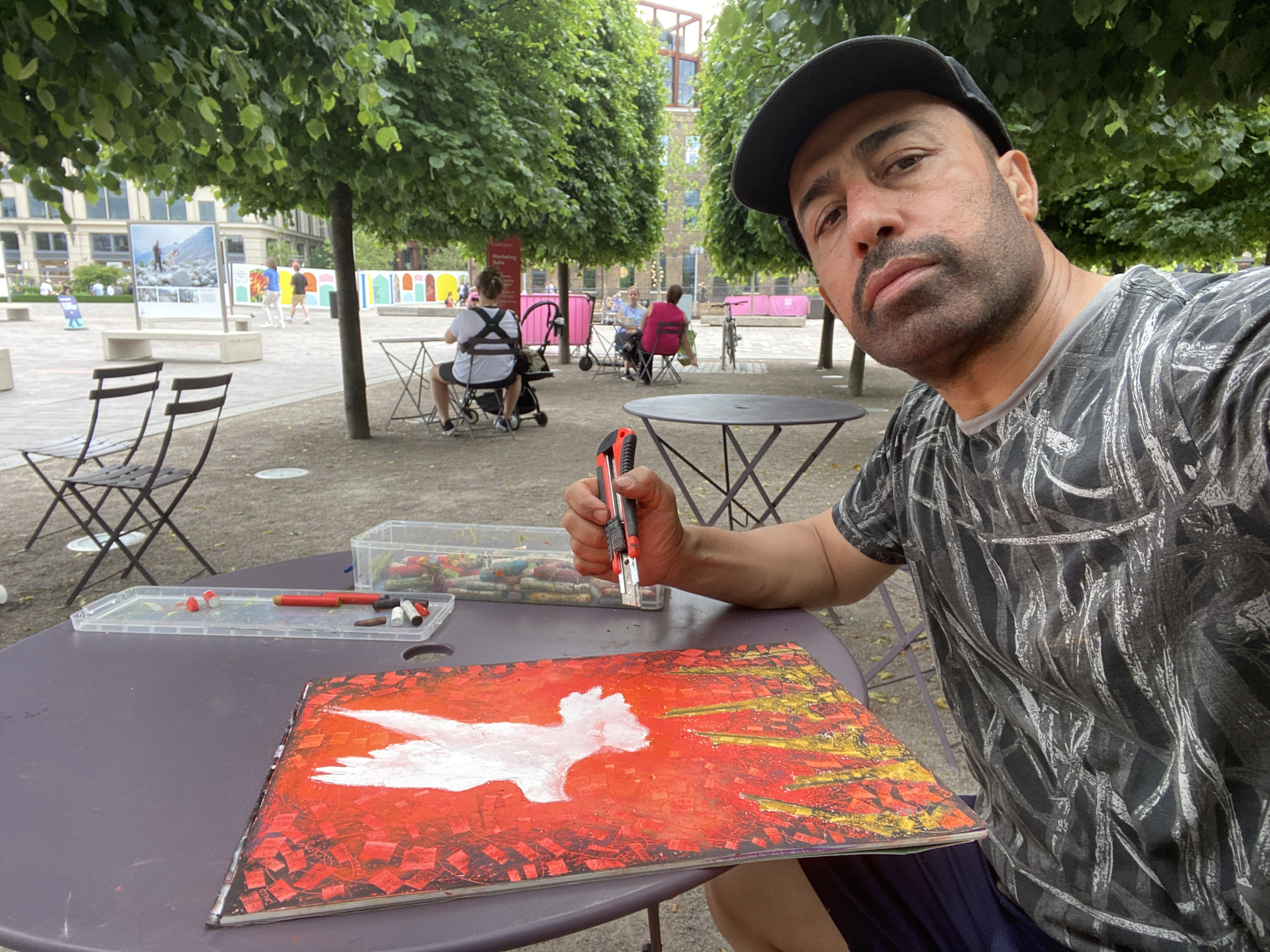
- Born: 1972 (age 53–54); Sulaymaniyah, Kurdistan Region, Iraq
- Education: BSc in fine arts MSc in civil engineering.
- Occupations: Artist, painter, poet
- Style: War, Surrialist
- Website: https://www.simko-art.co.uk/

Simko Ahmed (in Japanese: 澄湖 アフマド (born 1972) is a Kurdish artist.

He moved to Japan in 1996, where he became the first Kurd to become a Japanese citizen. His work as a representation of his life experiences, ranging from contemporary surrealism to abstract forms. Furthermore, Ahmad stressed his dedication to using his work to advocate for human rights, freedom, and equality, reflecting people's struggles across the globe.

== Early life and education ==
Simko Ahmed was born in Sulaymaniyah in 1972. After graduating from high school in Erbil, he planned to study at the college of fine arts, but his teachers advised him to study engineering since it has better outcome and more stable economy. He enrolled in Salahaddin University and graduated from the college of civil engineering in 1990. He later travelled to Japan to attend the college of fine arts at the University of Tokyo.

== Bibliography ==
- Colors Of Paradise, 2010
- Spring never dies, 2011
- Baran Art 1, 2012
- Sparrows of Paradise Painting, 2018

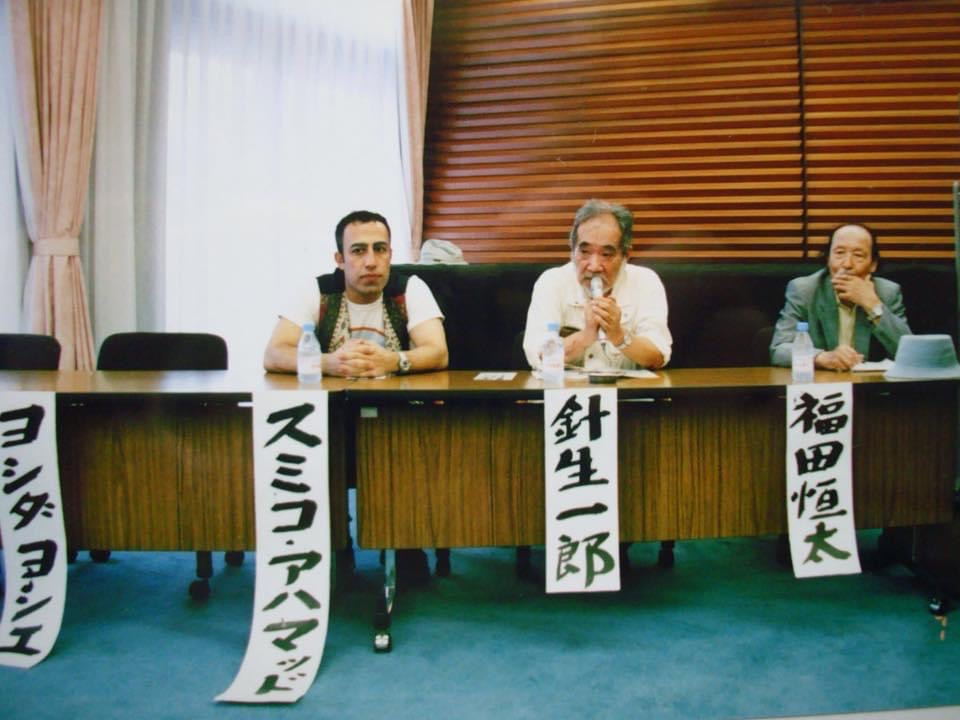
Jaala Beinale Tokyo Metropolitan art museum 2004(Left side: Simko Ahmed)
