= Kürd Mahruzlu =

Kurd Mahruzlu
- Azerbaijani: Kürd Mahruzlu
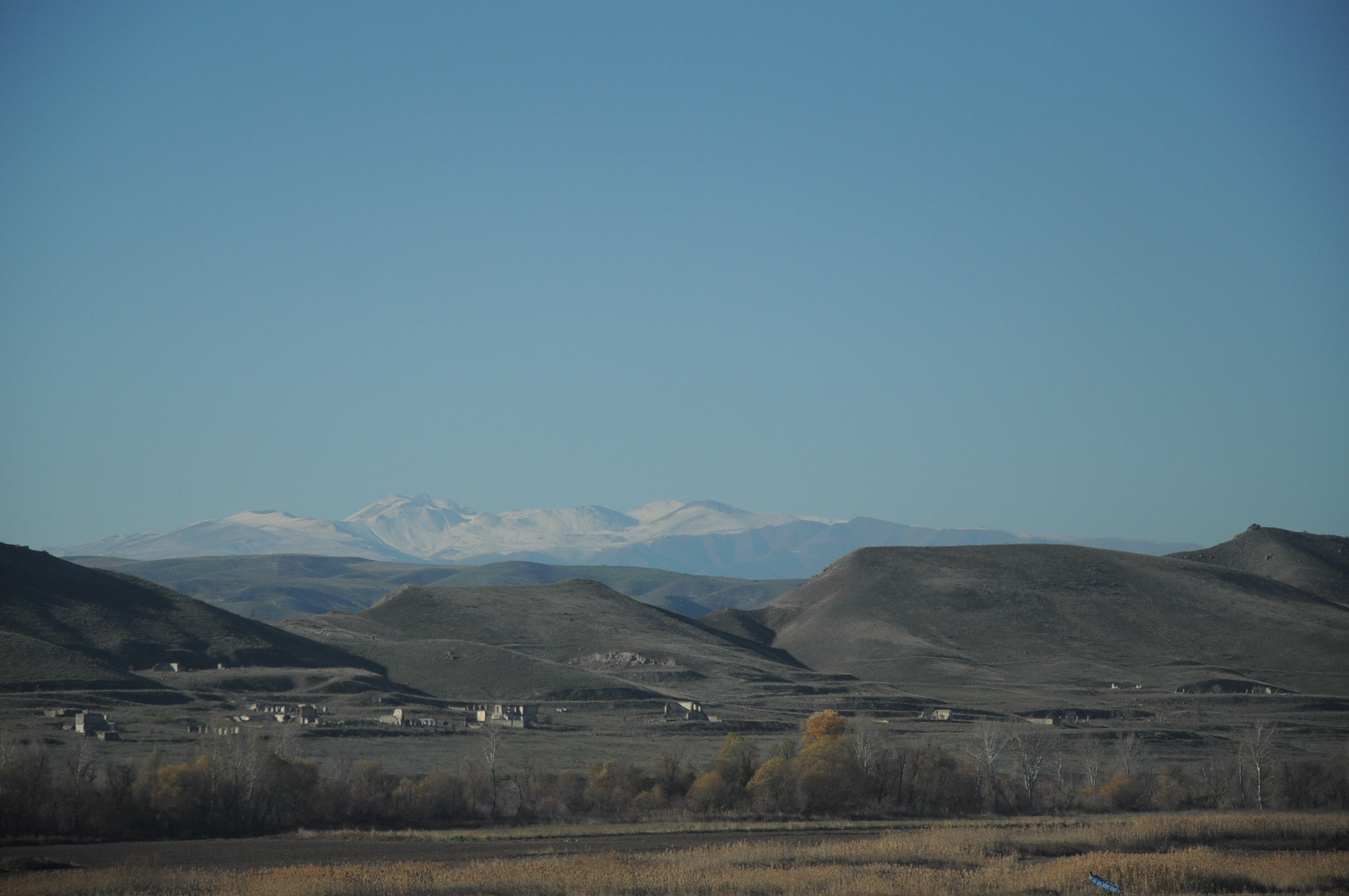

- Location within Azerbaijan
- Coordinates: 39°12′32″N 46°44′07″E
- Country: Azerbaijan
- District: Qubadli

Population (2015)
  - Total: 109
- Time zone: UTC+4 (AZT)

Kürd Mahruzlu (also Kürd Mahrızlı and Kurd Mahruzlu) is a village in the Qubadli District of Azerbaijan. The population of the village is 184, with 114 men and 70 women residing in 39 families.

== History ==
The village was located in the Armenian-occupied territories surrounding Nagorno-Karabakh, coming under the control of ethnic Armenian forces in 1993 following the First Nagorno-Karabakh War. The village subsequently became part of the breakaway Republic of Artsakh as part of its Kashatagh Province, referred to as Artsvashen (Armenian: Արծվաշեն). It was recaptured by Azerbaijan on 23 October 2020 during the 2020 Nagorno-Karabakh war.

== Etymology ==
The "Kürd" part of the town's name originates from the name of the chief of the Mahrizli tribe, Kurd Mafruzlu. The "Mahruzlu" part of the name originates from the name of the tribe.

== Gallery ==
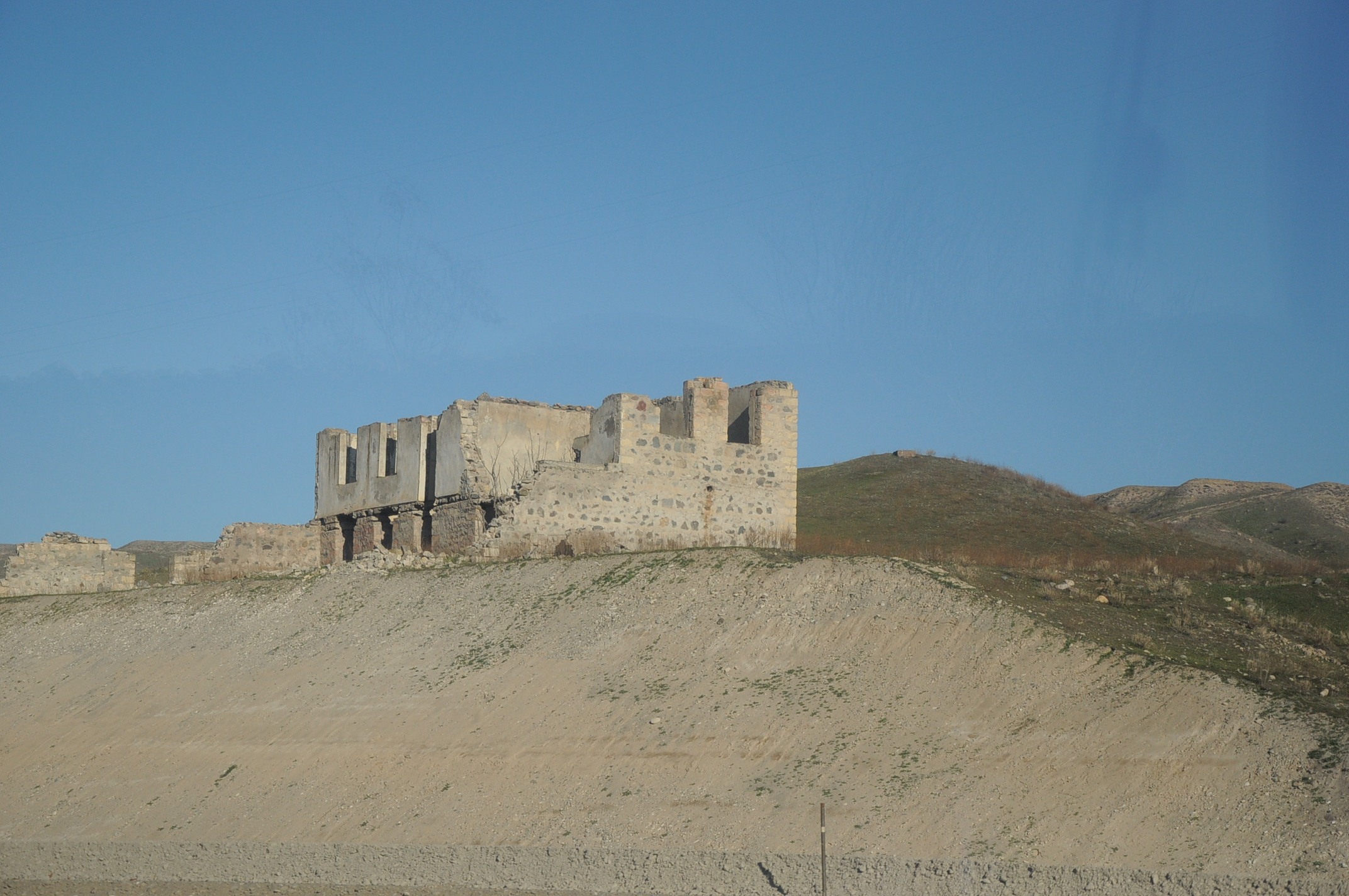

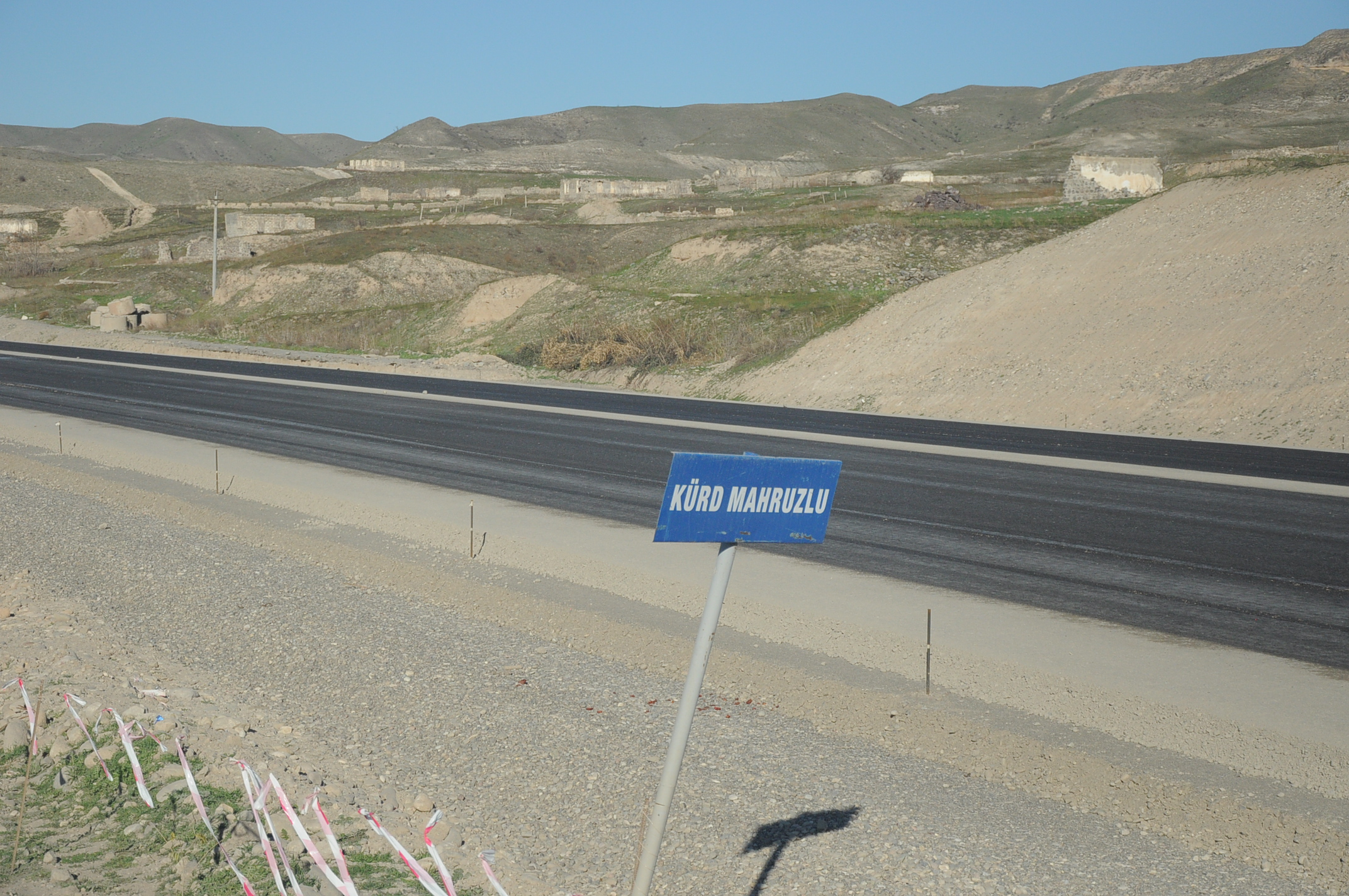

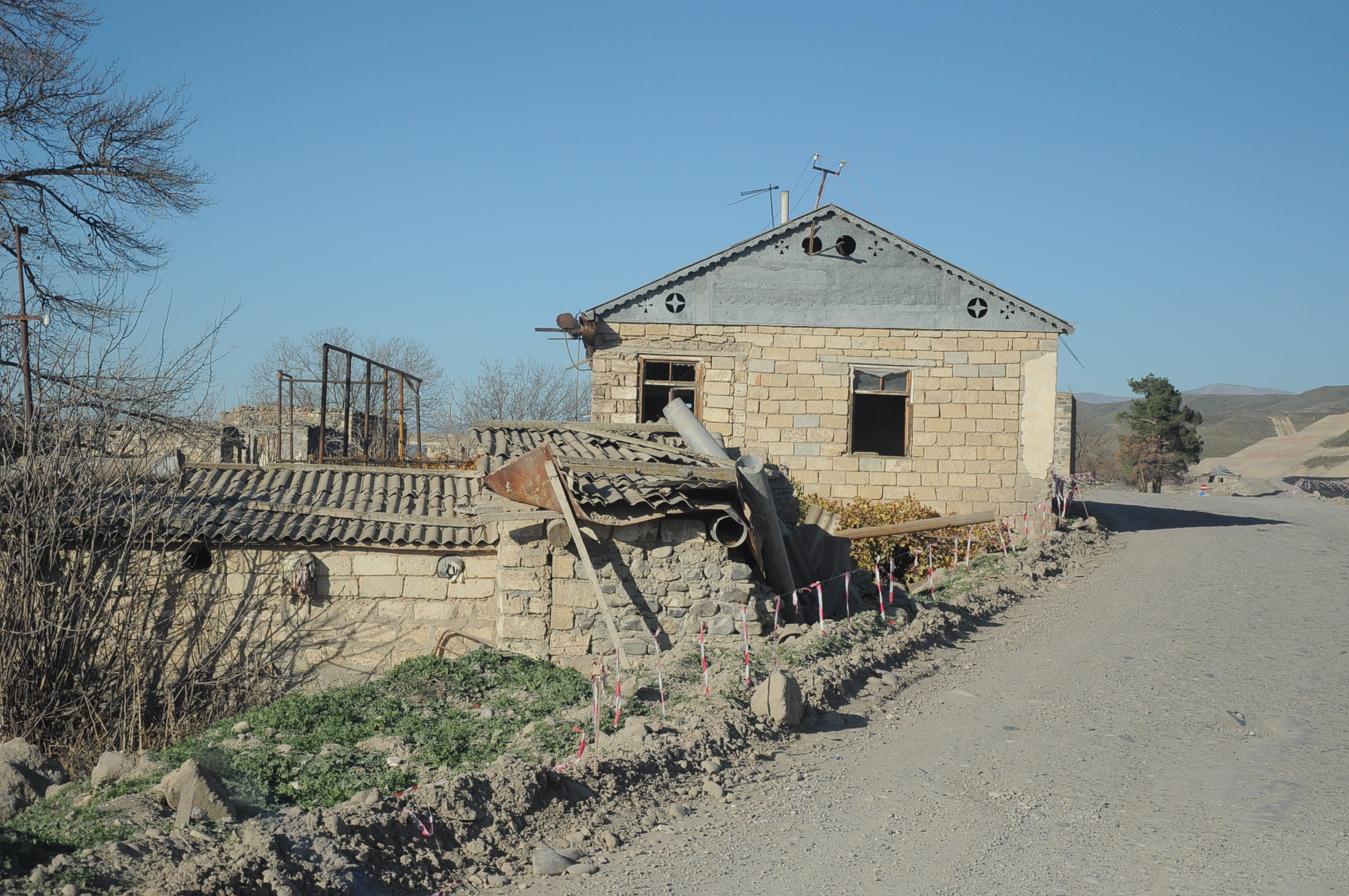

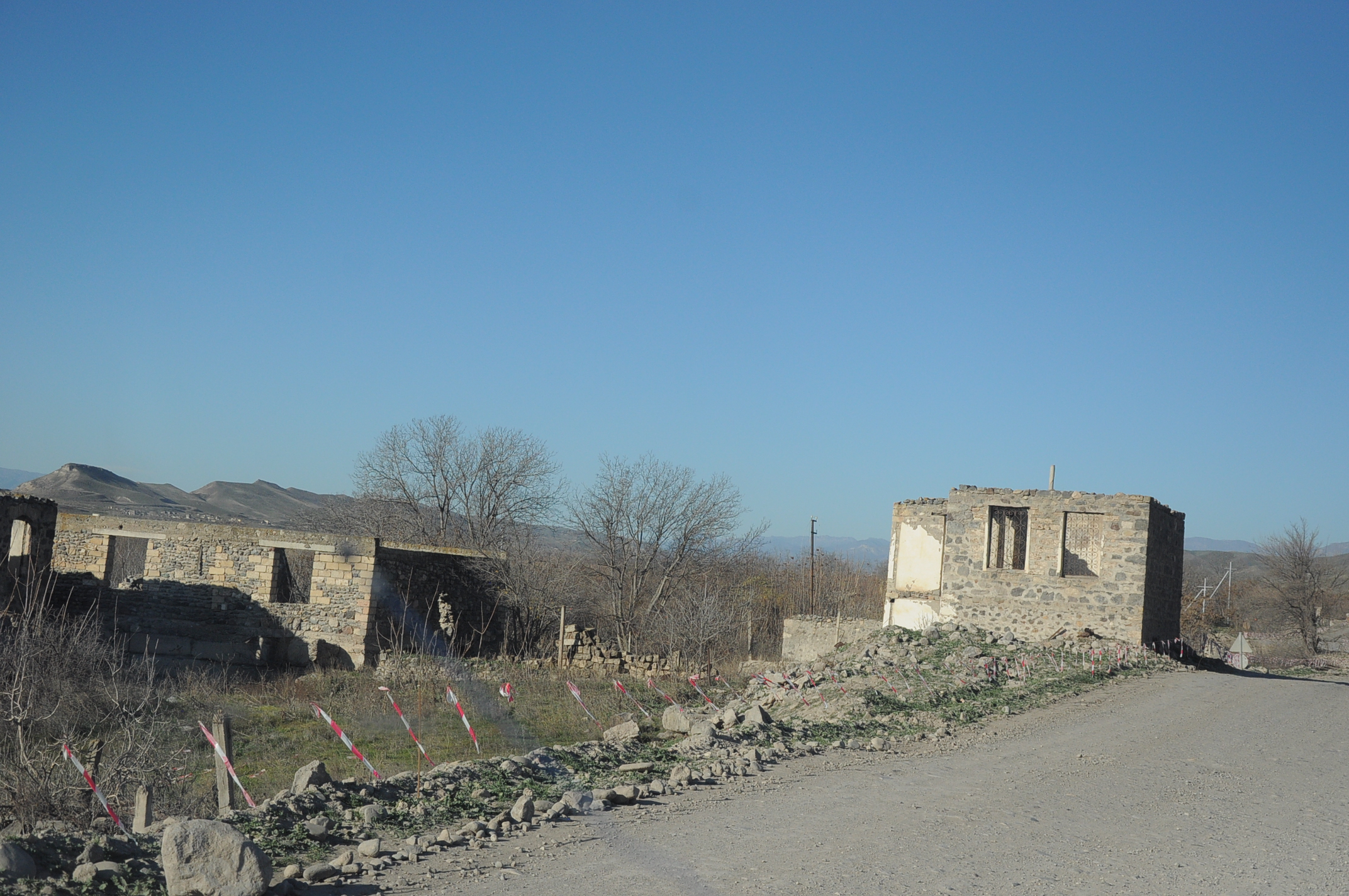

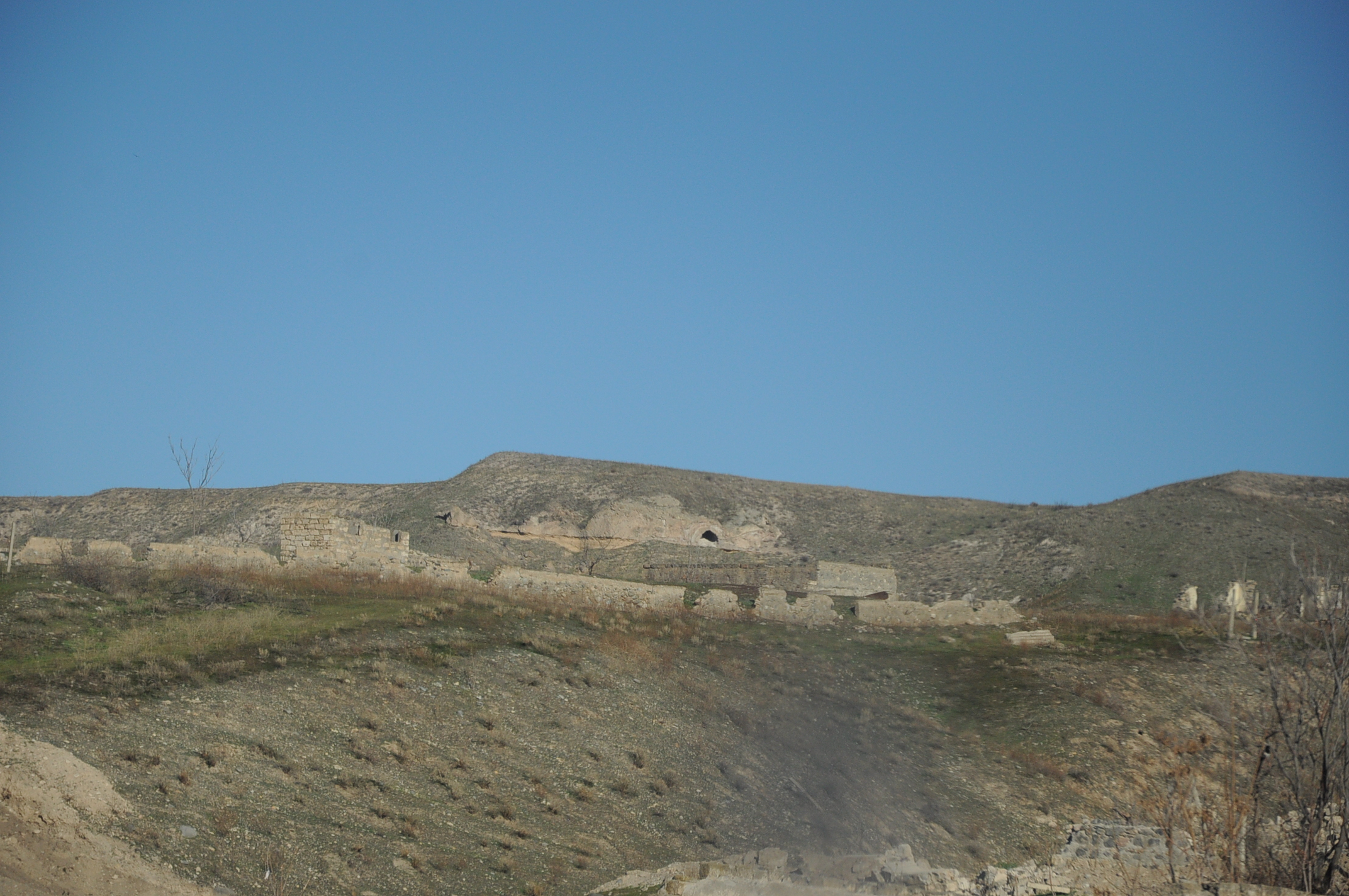
