= Kurd Ahmet Izzet Pasha =

Kurdish politician

Kurd Ahmet Izzet Pasha

Kurd Ahmed Izzet Pasha and Chrysostomos of Smyrna under the Greek flag

Kurd Ahmet Izzet Pasha, also known as Kambur Ahmed İzzet Bey, (1871,Constaninople –1920), an Ottoman Kurd, governor and minister, was the son of Husein Pasha, half brother of Said Pasha Kurd and uncle of Şerif Pasha and Kurd Fuad Pasha.

He attended the Üsküdar Rüştiye Mektebi and later the Lisan Mektebi (Foreign Language School).

An outspoken opponent of Turkish nationalism, and a supporter of his nephew's Şerif Pasha's Ottoman Entente Liberale party. He wielded some influence over the Kurdish population of Constantinople, served as Vali of Van from 1912 to 1913, became Vali of Aidin Vilayet on 14 March 1919, and was appointed Minister of Evkaf (Pious Foundations) and interim minister of the Interior on 29 January 1919.

He had to take refuge in the British embassy after supporting the Greek community of Izmir. He ordered his Ottoman troops to not resist allied and Greek troops under the instruction of his nephew Şerif Pasha. He also ordered them to welcome Greek troops with a special ceremony and respect. In addition, he shouted 'Zito Venizelos! long live'. But he had warned the British government that the involvement of Greek troops in the allied landing would backfire and cause more trouble than good. He was called a British collaborator by the Turkish nationalists led by Mustafa Kemal and given the nickname Kambur (Hunchback) by them. The report of the Inter-Allied Commission of Inquiry of 1919 found that he treated all inhabitants impartially regardless of race and had resorted peace to the region.

Somerset Gough-Calthorpe hosted Kurd Ahmet Izzet Pasha on board HMS Iron Duke (1912) in preparation for the allied operation in Izmir.

He died of a heart attack on January 5, 1920, and was buried on the 6th in the Emir Sultan cemetery in Izmir. His funeral was attended by members of the local community, senior military figures and civil servants.

Posts held

- Translation Bureau (Tercüme Odası) at Bab-ı Ali (Bāb-i ʿAlī, the Sublime Porte)
- Chief of the Foreign Minister's Cabinet (Hariciye Nezareti Kalemi Müdürü)
- Governor of Van
- Minister of Pious Foundations
- Minister of interior (interim)
- Twice deputy Minister of the interior in two different cabinets of Ahmet Tevfik Pasha
- Governor of Izmir
