= Kürd Eldarbəyli =

Kurd Eldarbeyli
- Municipality
- Azerbaijani: Kürd Eldarbəyli
- Location within Azerbaijan
- Coordinates: 40°45′53″N 47°50′49″E
- Country: Azerbaijan
- District: Ismailli

Population
  - Total: 762
- Time zone: UTC+4 (AZT)
  - Summer (DST): UTC+5 (AZT)

Kürd Eldarbəyli (also, Kurd Eldarbeyli) is a village and municipality in the Ismailli District of Azerbaijan. It has a population of 762. The municipality consists of the villages of Kurd Eldarbeyli and Güdəyli.
