= Kurdish rugs =

Rugs woven by Kurds

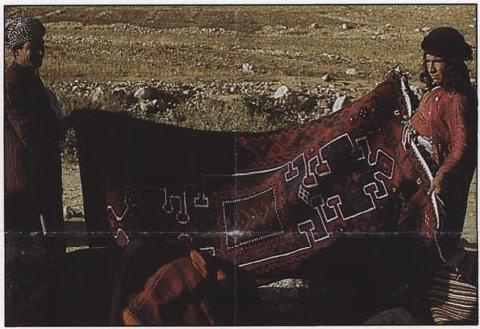
- Kurdish couple displaying a traditional handmade Kurdish rug
- Type: Handwoven rug
- Material: Wool, Cotton, Silk (rarely)
- Production method: Knotted-pile, Flat-woven
- Production process: Hand-spun, vegetable-dyed, hand-knotted
- Place of origin: Kurdistan (primarily Iranian Kurdistan)
- Introduced: Ancient times
- Manufacturer: Various Kurdish weavers and workshops

Kurdish rugs (Kurdish: فەرشی کوردی) are rugs woven by Kurds in Kurdistan. When referring to Kurdish rugs within the rug industry, one is referring to those made within Iranian Kurdistan.

== Gallery ==
Kurdish Wagireh

Antique Kurdish Rug, date: 1207 AH (1792 AD)

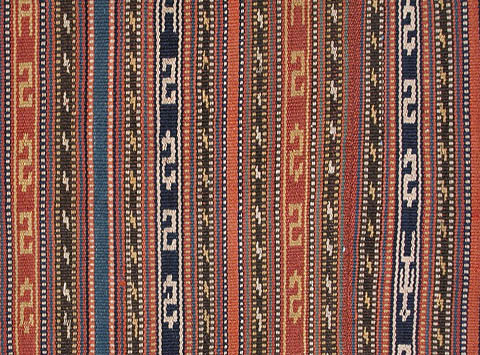
Kurdish Jajim carpet from Bojnurd

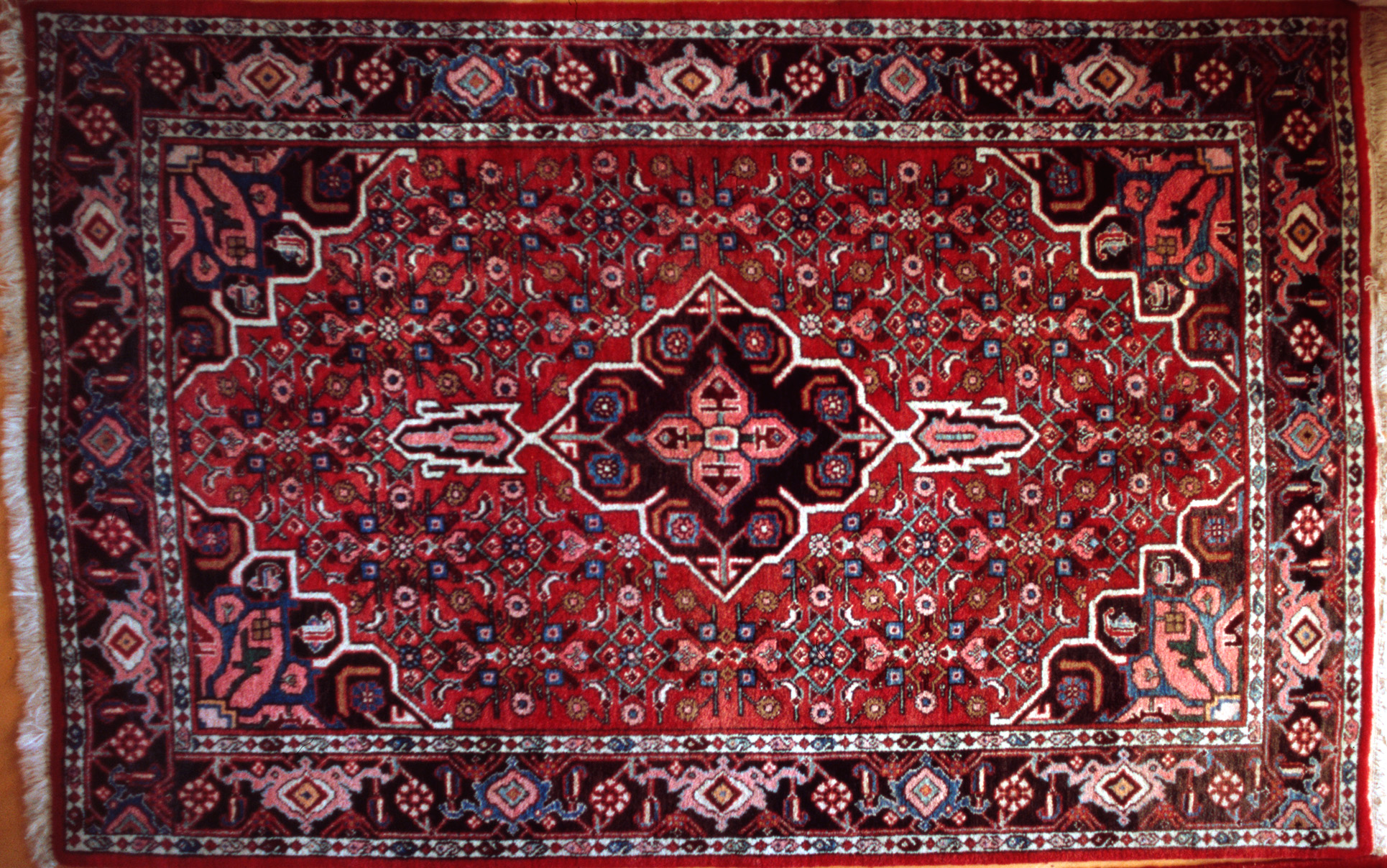
A Kurdish Bidjar rug

== See also ==
- Yürük rug
- Persian rug
