= Mustafa Yamulki =

Kurdish soldier and official (1866–1936)

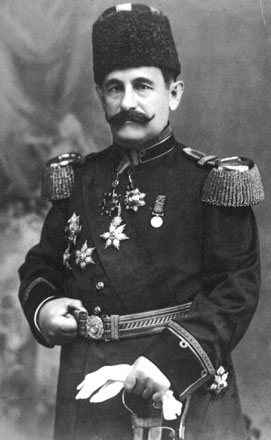
- Mustafa Yamulki
- Born: January 25, 1866; Sulaimaniyah, Mosul Vilayet, Ottoman Empire
- Died: May 25, 1936 (aged 70); Sulaimaniyah, Iraq
- Military career
- Allegiance: Ottoman Empire, Kingdom of Kurdistan
- Rank: Major general
- Nickname: Nimrod Mustafa Pasha
- Unit: Third Army
- Conflicts: Italo-Turkish War; Balkan Wars

Mustafa Yamulki (25 January 1866 – 25 May 1936), also known as "Nemrud" Mustafa Pasha, was an Ottoman-Kurdish military officer, chairman of the Ottoman military court, minister for education in the Kingdom of Kurdistan and a journalist. Mustafa was born in the city of Sulaimaniyah which was then in the Mosul Vilayet of the Ottoman Empire.

== Early life ==
Mustafa was born into an old landowning Kurdish family from Sulaymaniyah. Mustafa attended the Ottoman Military Academy at Constantinople (present-day Istanbul). He was from the powerful Bilbaz Kurdish tribe.

== Political career ==
After the defeat of the Ottoman Empire in World War I, he was appointed the head of the Turkish courts-martial on 18 April 1920. As chairman of the Court, which was also called the "war tribunal of Nemrut Mustafa", he condemned Mustafa Kemal to death in absentia along with other of his associates. The warrant was also signed by Ali Kemal, Damad Ferid and the Sultan Vahdettin. Mustafa also sentenced Ebubekir Hazim (Tepeyran), the Minister of the Interior for aiding the Turkish nationalists. He was dismissed from this office in June.

Mustafa stated,

Our compatriots have committed untold crimes by resorting to every conceivable form of despotism, organized deportation and massacre, burned feeding mothers doused with petrol alive, raped women and girls…. They have subjected the Armenians to intolerable conditions, such as no other people had ever experienced throughout history.

Later, Mustafa was arrested and sentenced to 7 months in prison. However, he was pardoned by Sultan Mehmed VI in February 1921. In June 1921 he left Turkey for Mandatory Iraq and went on to live in his hometown of Sulaymaniyah, Iraq.

His brother-in-law Izzet Bey was the former governor of the Van Vilayet and Minister of the Pious foundations under the cabinet of Ahmet Tevfik Pasha.

Mustafa's son was Abdul Aziz Yamulki, the chief plotter of coup d'état against the Bakr Sidqi government.

== Posts Held ==
- vice-governor of Bursa
- Education minister of the Kingdom of Kurdistan
