= Kurd Fuad Pasha =

Kurdish politician and military officer

- Portrait of Kurd Fuad Pasha
- Born: Constantinople, Ottoman Empire
- Relatives: Said Pasha Kurd (father); Şerif Pasha (brother); Ahmet İzzet Pasha (uncle)
- Military career
- Allegiance: Ottoman Empire
- Branch: Ottoman Army
- Rank: General
- Commands: Ottoman Military Academy (Commandant); President of the Military Court of Appeal
- Other work: Vice President of the Society for the Rise of Kurdistan

Kurd Fuad Pasha, born in Constantinople, was a Vice President of the Society for the Elevation of Kurdistan.

Fuad was the son of Said Pasha Kurd, nephew to Kurd Ahmet Izzet Pasha and brother of Şerif Pasha.

He was a cavalry officer and graduated from the Prussian Staff College. He was the head of the Ottoman Military College and the Ottoman court of military appeals. He was made to retire from the military and his posts by the Committee of Union and Progress because of his brother's opposition activities. Fuad was one of the leading figures of the Kurdish movement.

His wife was Suat Hanım, the sister of Eqrem Vlora and the eldest of the three daughters of Syrja Vlora.
