= Kurdish literature =

Written and orally transmitted literature in Kurdish languages

Kurdish literature (ئەدەبی کوردی) is literature written in the Kurdish languages. Literary Kurdish works have been written in several Kurdish varieties, including languages: Zaza, Gorani, Kurmanji, Sorani, Laki and Southern Kurdish. Balül, a 9th-century poet and religious scholar of the Yarsani faith, is the first well-known poet who wrote in Gorani Kurdish. Ehmedê Xanî (1650–1707) is probably the most renowned of the old Kurdish poets. He wrote the romantic epic Mem û Zîn in Kurmanji, sometimes considered the Kurdish national epic. Sorani poetry developed mainly after the late 18th century.

In many regions, most written Kurdish literature, when prose genres began to be developed.

== Zaza–Gorani literature ==
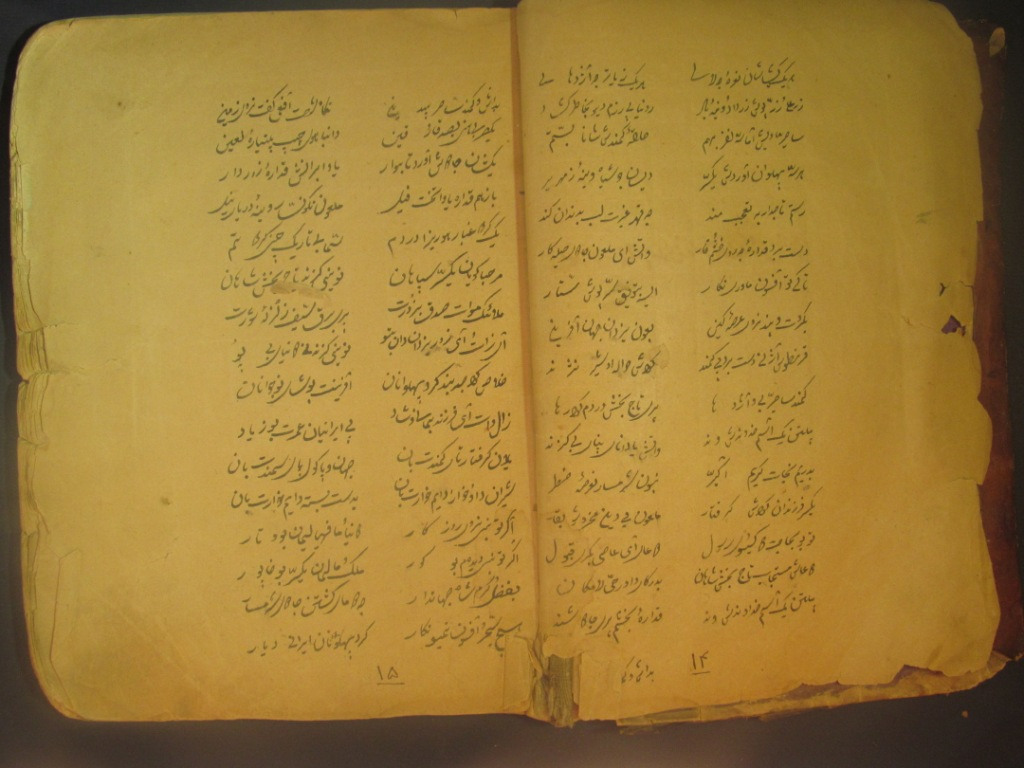
A manuscript of Kurdish Shahnameh from the archive of legacy committee of Vejin in Mariwan

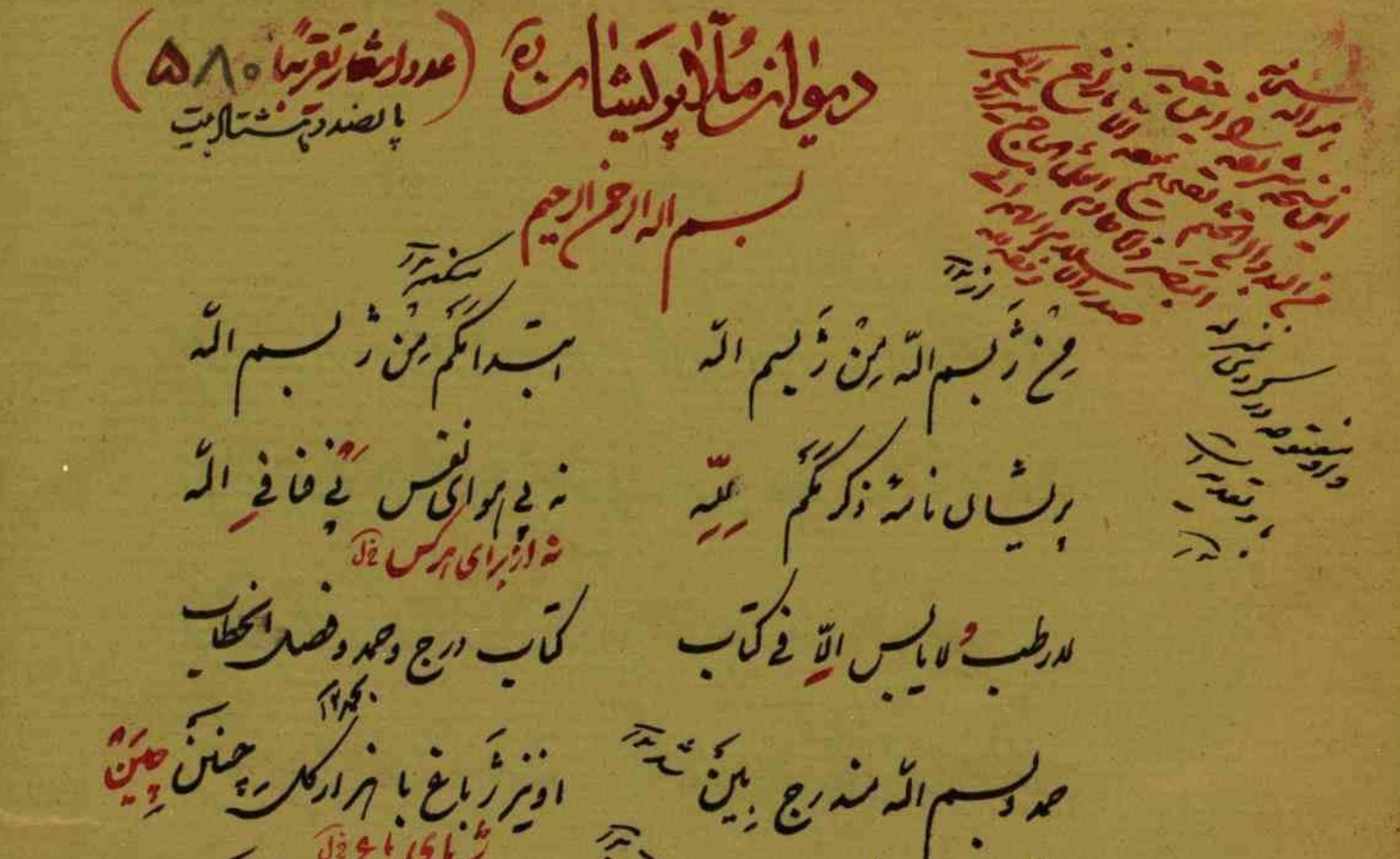
The first lines of Pareshan Nama, a poem by Mele Perîşan the 14th Century Kurdish poet in Gorani. The manuscript is kept in Tehran.

Zaza and Gorani (also known as Hewrami) are which are classified by many linguists as Northwestern Iranian languages and are often considered distinct from the Kurdish languages, although self-identification varies among speakers. Gorani served as a literary language in certain historical contexts, although its literary variety differs in many ways from the local language called Hewrami. It was particularly in use at the court of the Ardalan emirate based in Sanandaj. The religious texts of the Yarsanis are written in Gorani. Some of the well-known Gorani-language poets and writers are Mele Perîşan (1356–1431), Shaykh Mustafa Takhtayi, Mistefa Bêsaranî (1642–1701), Muhammad Kandulayi (late 17th century), Khana Qubadi (1700–1759), Shayda Awrami (1784–1852) and Mastoureh Ardalan (1805–1848).

A small amount of literature in the Zaza language has been published. Some writers, mainly Sweden-based authors like Mehemed Malmîsanij and Ebubekir Pamukçu, write in Zaza.

== Kurmanji literature ==
=== Classical ===
The earliest surviving text written in Kurdish is a Kurmanji translation of a Christian prayer in Armenian letters, copied between 1430 and 1446 and preserved in an Armenian manuscript. Besides this, the earliest written works in Kurdish are from the 16th and 17th centuries. Information about the earliest Kurdish poets is incomplete. The dates for authors given by Mahmud Bayazidi, who was long an important early source for Kurdish literary history, are not considered reliable. Little information survives about Ali Hariri, whom Bayazidi dated to the 15th century but who, according to Thomas Blois, should be placed later. Melayê Cizîrî (1570–1640) is said to have been the founder of a school of Kurmanji poets who wrote in the sub-dialect of Jazira/Bohtan. Cizîrî left behind a large number of poems, including qasidas (odes) and ghazals (lyrics), some of which are still popular. Feqiyê Teyran (1590–1660) was supposedly Cizîrî's student. He also wrote qasidas and ghazals, and he was the first known Kurdish poet to write narrative poems using the mathnawi (couplet) form. His Hikayeta Şêxê Sen'an (The story of Sheikh Sen'an) is a well-known epic poem.

Ehmedê Xanî (1650–1707) is probably the most renowned of the old Kurdish poets. His long romantic epic, Mem û Zîn (Mem and Zin), tells the story of two lovers from rival noble houses whose families prevent them from marrying. It is sometimes viewed as the Kurdish national epic. It may have drawn from the Kurdish popular epic Memî Alan and perhaps also from Nizami Ganjavi's Layla and Majnun. Khani followed classical literary conventions when composing the work. He also wrote a versified Arabic-Kurdish vocabulary for students titled Nûbihara Biçûkan (New spring for children) and a religious poem called Eqîda Îmanê (Faith in the religion). His student was Ismaîlê Bayazidî (1654–1709), author of many Kurdish poems and a Kurmanci-Arabic-Persian glossary titled Gulzar (Rose garden).

Mela Huseynê Bateyî, who was born sometime in the 17th and died in the mid-18th century, wrote a mawlud (i.e., a poem about the Prophet Muhammad's birth) and a poem about morality and manners, which was apparently so popular that It was reportedly incorporated into Yazidi oral tradition. In the 18th century, Şerif Xan (1682–1748), a member of the ruling family of Hakkari, wrote many poems in Kurmanji and Persian, and Mûrad Xan from Bayazid (1736–1778) authored many lyrical poems.

=== Yazidi literature ===
The Yazidis are a Kurmanji-speaking ethno-religious group whose religious texts have been passed down mostly orally. In 1911 and 1913, two Kurmanji texts called the Meshefa Reş and the Kitêba Cilvê, were published. These were purported to be the sacred books of the Yazidis, but they were really written in modern times by non-Yazidis. The oldest versions of the books were found in the 1880s and were written in Arabic, not Kurdish. Nevertheless, at least some part of the books corresponds to actual Yazidi religious tradition.

== Sorani literature ==
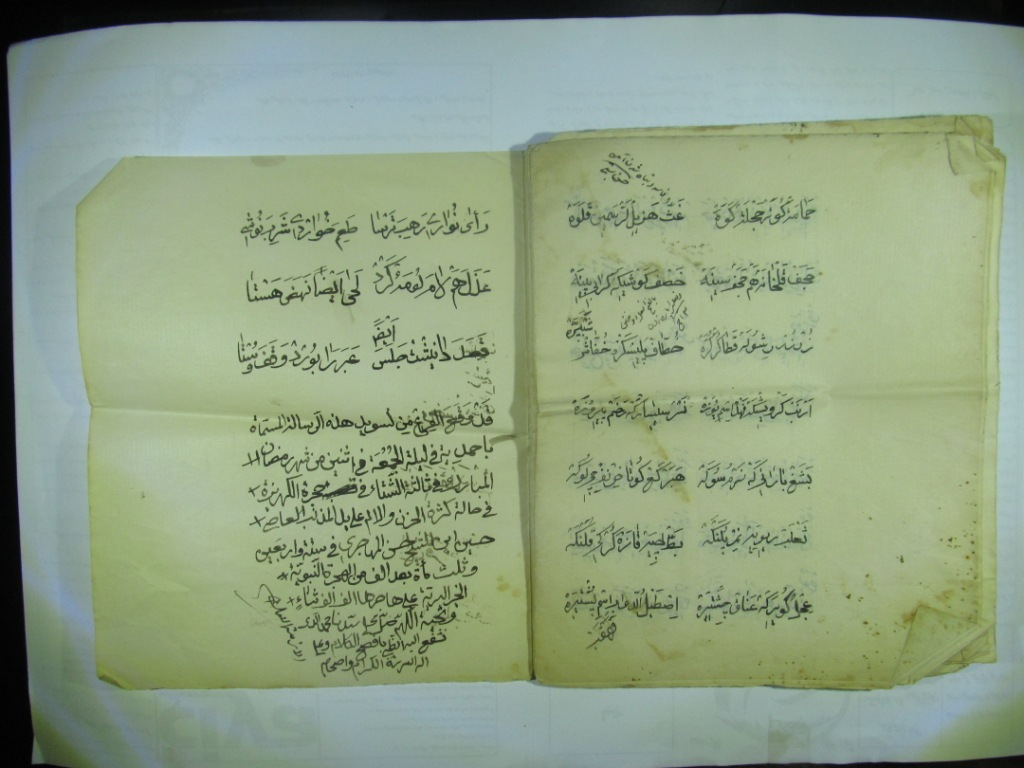
A manuscript of Ahmadi dictionary by Shex Marof Nodê (1753–1838) from the archive of legacy committee of Vejin. This manuscript is written in 1928.

In contrast to Kurmanji, literary works in Sorani were not abundant before the late 18th and early 19th century. Although some poets wrote in Sorani before Nalî, Sorani gained prominence as a literary dialect following Nalî. Nalî was the first poet to write a diwan (collection of poems) in this dialect. Others, such as Salim and Kurdi, wrote in Sorani in the early 19th century as well. Haji Qadir Koyi of Koy Sanjaq in central Kurdistan (1817–1897), and Sheikh Reza Talabani (1835–1909) also wrote in Sorani dialect after Nalî. Some scholars cite the closeness for the late start in Sorani literature, as well as the fact that during 15th to 19th century, there was a rich literary tradition in the Kurmanji dialect. Furthermore, the presence of the Gorani dialect as a literary language and its connection to Yarsanism and Ardalan dynasty was another reason that people did not produce texts in Sorani.

== A historical list of Kurdish literature and poets ==
=== Religious ===
- Mishefa Reş (Black Book), a text associated with the religious tradition of the Yazidis. It is traditionally attributed to Shaykh Hasan (born c. 1195), a nephew of Shaykh Adi ibn Musafir. However, scholars have argued that the surviving versions were compiled in the late 19th or early 20th century by non-Yazidi authors.
- Serencam, the sacred text collection of the Yarsan tradition.

=== Goranî dialect ===
- Balül (9th century)
- Mele Perîşan (14th century)
- Khana Qubadi (Xana Qubadî) (1700–1759),
- Almas Khan-e Kanoule'ei (17th and 18th century)
- Mastoureh Ardalan (Mestûrey Erdelan) (1805–1848)
- Mawlawi Tawagozi (Mewlewî Tawegozî) (1806–1882)

=== Famous poets in Kurmancî dialect ===
- Mela Hesenê Bateyî (Melayê Bateyî) (1417–1491) of Hekkarî, the author of Mewlûda Kurmancî (Birthday in Kurmanji), a collection of poems.
- Melayê Cizîrî (Mela Ehmedê Cizîrî) (1570–1640) of Bohtan region, poet and Sufi.
- Faqi Tayran (Feqiyê Teyran) (1590–1660) Student of Melayê Cezîrî. He is credited for contributing the earliest literary account of the Battle of Dimdim in 1609–1610 between Kurds and Safavid Empire.
- Ahmad Khani (Ehmedê Xanî) (1651–1707) (The epic drama of Mem û Zîn) (Born in Hakkari, Turkey)
- Mahmud Bayazidi (Mahmud Bayazidi), (1797–1859) Kurdish writer.

=== Soranî dialect ===
- Nalî (1798–1855)
- Haji Qadir Koyi (Hacî Qadir Koyî) (1817–1897)
- Sheikh Rezza Talabani (Şêx Reza Talebanî) (1835–1910)
- Mahwi (1830–1906)
- Wafaei (1844–1902)

=== Kurdish poets and writers of the 20th century ===
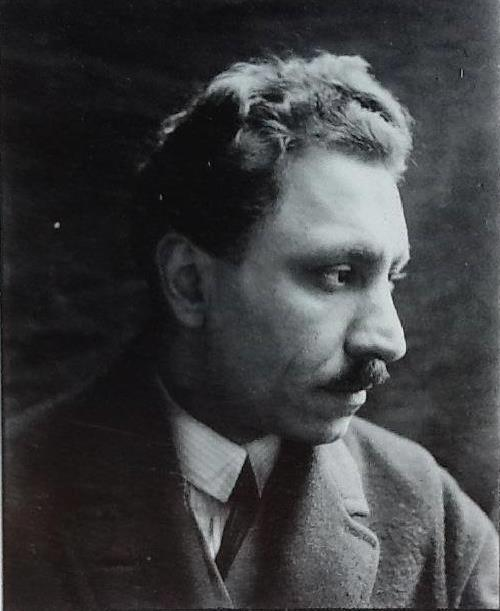
Celadet Bedir Khan

Nado Makhmudov

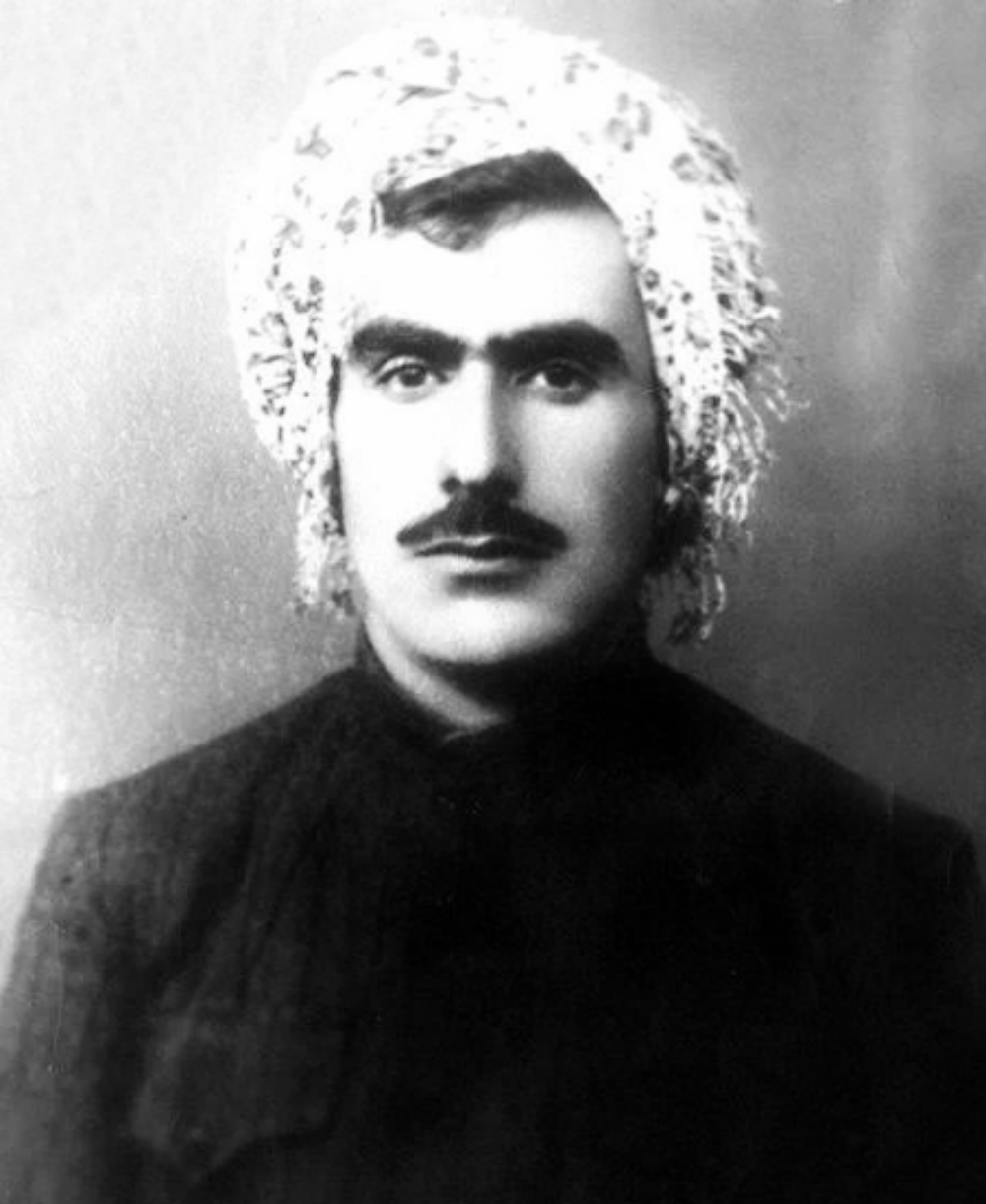
Hejar

- Alişer (1862–1937), poet and rebel leader, Ottoman Empire/Turkey.
- Nari Mela Kake Heme (1874–1944), poet, born and died in Marivan, Iran.
- Piramerd (Tewfîq Beg Mehmûd Axa, 1867–1950), poet, writer, playwright and journalist, Ottoman Empire/Iraq.
- Celadet Alî Bedirxan (1893–1951), writer, journalist and linguist. Author of the modern Kurmanji Latin alphabet.
- Arab Shamilov (Erebê Şemo, 1897–1978), Kurdish novelist in Armenia. Author of the first Kurdish novel.
- Cigerxwîn (Jigarkhwin, real name Sheikhmous Hasan, 1903–1984), poet, born in Mardin, Ottoman Empire. Died in Sweden.
- Abdulla Goran (1904–1962), the founder of modern Kurdish poetry, Iraq.
- Osman Sabri (1905–1993), Kurdish poet, writer and journalist, Turkey/Syria.
- Nado Makhmudov (1907–1990), Kurdish writer and public figure, Armenia.
- Hemin Mukriyani (1920–1986) poet and journalist, Iran.
- Hejar (real name Abdurrahman Sharafkandi, 1920–1990), poet, writer, translator and linguist, Iran.
- Jamal Nebez (1933–2018), writer, linguist, translator and academic, Germany.
- Sherko Bekas (1940–2013), poet, Iraqi Kurdistan. His poems have been translated into over 10 languages.
- Latif Halmat (born 1947), poet, Iraqi Kurdistan.
- Abdulla Pashew (born 1947), poet, Iraqi Kurdistan.
- Salim Barakat (born 1951), poet, writer, and novelist, Syria.
- Rafiq Sabir (born 1950), poet, Sweden.
- Mehmed Uzun (1953–2007), contemporary writer and novelist, Turkey/Sweden
- Firat Cewerî (born 1959), contemporary writer and novelist, Turkey/Sweden.
- Jan Dost (born 1965), writer and novelist, Syria.
- İbrahim Halil Baran (born 1981), poet, writer and designer.
- Azad Zal (born 1972), writer, journalist, translator, poet, linguist and lexicographer
- Suwara Ilkhanizada (1937–1976), among the first poets that composed modern poems in Kurdistan.

=== Kurdish poets and writers of the 21st century ===
- Bachtyar Ali (born 1960), novelist from Slemani, Iraqi Kurdistan
- Bayan Salman (born 1961), novelist from Kirkuk, Iraqi Kurdistan
- Behrouz Boochani (born 1983), novelist from Ilam, Iran
- Sara Omar (born 1986), novelist, poet. The first internationally recognised female novelist from Slemani, Iraqi Kurdistan.

== See also ==
- Comma Press books
- Kurdistan +100: Stories from a Future State
