= Abdul Karim Mudarris =

Iraqi Islamic scholar and poet (1901–2005)

Al-Mudarris Abdul Karim bin Mohammad bin Fattah bin Sulaiman bin Mustafa bin Mohammad al-Shahrizori
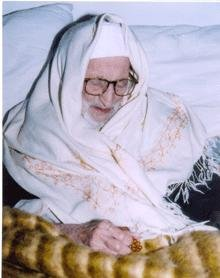
- Al-Mudarris in his later life

Personal life
- Born: Between 1900-1905 (most probably 1902) Gweza Kwera village, Marivan, Qajar Iran
- Died: 30 August 2005 (aged 102–103) Baghdad, Republic of Iraq
- Resting place: Mausoleum of Abdul-Qadir Gilani
- Occupation: Faqih and Mufti of Iraq

Religious life
- Religion: Islam
- Denomination: Sunni (Shafi'i school)

Mala Abdul Karim Mudarris or Maulana Sheikh Abdul Karim Mudarris (1902 — 2005) (Kurdish: Mele Ebdulkerîmê Muderîs, Arabic: عبد الكريم المدرس), also known as Nami, was a Kurdish Faqih, Mufti of Iraq, and Quran interpreter in addition to being a poet, writer, as well as a translator. He was known by the epithet Mudarris (English: the teacher) because he taught Islamic sciences for more than 80 years. Al-Mudarris left a legacy of approximately 150 publications (in Arabic, Kurdish, and Persian languages) on a multitude of subjects (Islamic fiqh, shariah, Quran interpretation, hadith studies, history, poetry, rhetoric, etc.) The majority of this work got published. His book, "Two Sentences" (Kurdish: دوو رسته), which was published in 1982, is a dictionary which defines Arabic words in poems in Kurdish. He was the first person to translate the Quran into Kurdish. The Kurdistan governmental region has decided to open a place for his works.

== Early life ==
He was born in a small village called Takiya (تکية). His father died when he was a small child. He started studying in Marivan and studying in Arabic grammar and studied other sciences under the guidance of haji Mulla Aziz who was the imam of a mosque in Sulaimaniyah. When the First World War began in 1914 he moved to another village until he eventually, with some students, settled in a mosque in Sulaimaniyah. Thereafter he moved to the mosque of Shaikh Husam al-Din, where he studied various books on Arabic grammar, logic, the art of debate, argumentation and Fiqh. He then continued his studies in Halabje, Suleimanieh and Baghdad. In 1924, he was appointed as a teacher in Halabja district, then he moved to Biyara to teach the Islamic Sciences where he remained for about 24 years and served as a Khatib for approximately 18 years. In 1951, he moved back to Sulaimani where he taught at the Mosque of Haji Han for about three years. In 1954 he moved to Kirkuk where he taught at the Haji Jamil al-Ialibani Centre. In 1960 Sheikh Mudarris moved to Baghdad where he became Imam and khatib and a teacher at the Sheikh ‘Abdul Qadiri Gaylani Mosque. Sheikh Mudarris retired from official duties in 1973, but continued teaching. After the death of Sheikh Najm al-Din al-Wa’iz, he was appointed as the head of the ‘Ulama’ League of Iraq. Many also regarded him as the Mufti of Baghdad. Sheikh Mudarris died on 30 August 2005 and was buried in the Gaylani tomb in Baghdad.

== Some of his Kurdish Works ==
- Editing and expounding of Mahwi's poems
- Editing and expounding of Nalî's poems
- Editing and expounding of Mawlawi Tawagozi's poems
- Editing and expounding of Faqe Qader Hamawand's poems
- Editing and expounding of Aqidey Marzie from Mawlawi Tawagozi
- The Sharia of Islam in Kurdish
- Nami Tafsir, his Tafsir of Qur'an in Kurdish

== Some of his Arabic Works ==
- Nurol'iman
- Nurol'Islam
- Our Scientists working for science and religion
- The articles of Erfan
- Jawaher Alfatawa

== Persian works ==
- Translation of Kak Ahmad Suleimany's Articles from Persian to Kurdish
- The Shamshirkari article in refusing who is not believe in Taqlid

== See also ==
- List of Kurdish philosophers
