= Literature in Iran =

Literature in Iran encompasses a variety of literary traditions in the various languages used in Iran. Modern literatures of Iran include Persian literature (in Persian, the country's primary language), Azerbaijani literature (in Azerbaijani, the country's second largely spoken language), and Kurdish literature (in Kurdish, the country's third largely spoken language), among others.

== History ==
Iran's earliest surviving literary traditions are that of Avestan, the Iranian languages sacred language of the Avesta whose earliest literature is attested from the 6th century BC and is still preserved by the country's Zoroastrian communities in the observation of their religious rituals, and that of Persian, the Iranic language that originates from the Old Iranian dialect of the region of Persis (better known as Persia) in southwestern Iran and has an earlier attested literature from between the 3rd to the 10th century AD, apart from its oldest attested form that is carved on ancient inscriptions from between the 6th to the 4th century BC.

Persian is Iran's official language and the language of the country's ethnic majority (i.e., the Persians), and Persian literature has been the country's most influential literary tradition. Apart from Iran, Persian literature was used and developed further through several medieval Persianate societies in Asia Minor, Central Asia, and South Asia, and the language is still used widely in Central Asia (Tajikistan and Uzbekistan) and Afghanistan.

Arabic literature began to develop in Iran following the Muslim conquest. The Semitic Arabic language, from which many words were borrowed into the languages of Iran and whose script replaced Iran's earlier writing systems, was used largely by Iranian authors in the medieval era, as it functioned as an international language throughout the Muslim dominance. Medieval Iranian authors used Arabic especially for scholarly literature in various fields, flourishing first through Khorasan. They wrote some of the most remarkable Arabic-language history accounts on both Iranian and universal history, notably that of the well-known scholar Tabari.

The Turkic Azerbaijani language, which developed as a branch of the Oghuz Turkic languages through the 5th to the 11th and the 6th to the 12th century in and around Azerbaijan and is today the native language of Iran's second-largest ethnic group (i.e., the Azerbaijanis), has a literary tradition originating from the time of the 13th-century Mongol conquest of Iran, incorporating both Turkic and Iranian influences. Azerbaijani literature was developed highly after Iran's reunification under the Safavid Empire, whose rulers themselves wrote poetry, as well as under the reign of the Qajar dynasty. Chagatai, the prestigious and influential Turkic language that was itself influenced remarkably by Iranian languages (Sogdian and Persian), was also used, apart from its predominant location in Central Asia's Transoxiana, by writers in Shiraz, Isfahan, and Qazvin. Many poets from Azerbaijan wrote both in Azerbaijani and in Persian, although printing in Azerbaijani and other native languages of Iran except Persian was banned for a period under the reign of the Pahlavi ruler Reza Shah. Of Old Azeri, the Iranic language that was used in Azerbaijan prior to the development of Turkic, a few literary works also remain.

Kurdish, the Iraniian language that is spoken by the country's 3rd largest ethnic group (i.e., the Kurds), has a literary tradition incorporating the various Kurdish dialects that are spoken throughout Kurdistan. Kurdish literature, whose earliest works are those of the 16th-century poet Malaye Jaziri of western Kurdistan and at least one writer before him, was produced also throughout eastern Kurdistan in western Iran, notably with works from the time of the short-lived Soviet-backed autonomous Republic of Mahabad. Gurani, the Iranic language of the Guran Kurds in Hawraman that was once used as a court language by the Qajar-era Kurdish vassaldom of Ardalan, also produced a literary tradition originating from the 16th century that includes works notably of 19th-century poet and historian Mastura Ardalan of Senna and those of the religious texts of Yarsanism.

Iran's first printing press was founded in 1633 or 1636 by Khachatur Kesaratsi, a Safavid-era Armenian archbishop from Isfahan's Armenian neighborhood of New Julfa. Iranian Armenians, notably the 19th-century novelist Raffi, were among the contributors to Armenian literature, which originates from the earliest literary works in Armenian developed in Sasanian Armenia by the 5th century. Schools dedicated especially to the Armenian communities were established since the 19th century in Azerbaijan, Isfahan, and Tehran, encouraging Armenian writing throughout modern Iran, although they were closed for a period under the reign of Reza Shah.

The Kartvelian Georgian language, still spoken by the Iranian Georgians in Fereydan and other regions, also has an old literary history in Iran. Georgian writers of the Safavid era produced epics and laments on their life under the Safavid Empire, making considerable contributions to Georgian literature. Documents in both Georgian and Persian were produced by the Bagrationi dynasty, who were subject to the Iranian rulership. The earliest Georgian manuscript discovered in Iran is Samecniero ("Scientific"), a poem that describes biblical stories in an Islamic perspective and contains one of the first Georgian–Persian dictionaries, written by Iase Tushi, who settled in Isfahan in the early 17th century. Among other Georgian writers of the time was Teimuraz I, who ruled the Kingdom of Kakheti between 1605 and 1648 under Iranian hegemony and wrote a number of stories and historical narrations with significant Persian literary influences. Parsadan Gorgijanidze, a politician and historian in the Safavid Empire, was the author of a number of remarkable Georgian literary works in Iran, including a Georgian version of the Iranian epic poem Šāhnāme ("Book of the Kings") by the name of Rostomiani ("Stories of Rostom") and an account of the history of Georgia that was produced in Isfahan in the 1690s.

Among other languages used in Iran, Lurish, Balochi, Turkmen, Gilaki, and Tabari have also developed literature to some extent.

== See also ==
- Category:Iranian literature
- List of Iranian writers
