= Yusuf Yaska =

Kurdish poet (1592–1636)

- Born: 1592
- Died: 1636 (aged 43–44)

Yusuf Yaska (Kurdish: یۆسف یاسکە, 1592-1636) was a Kurdish poet, considered, along with Mistefa Bêsaranî, to be one of the early members of Gorani poetry after Mele Perîşan. The content of his ghazals were about love and nature. Little is known about his personal life, yet Minorsky wrote that Yaska was executed by immurement after his master Khan Ahmad Khan Ardalan of Ardalan suspected him of dallying with his wife, daughter of Shah Abbas.

== Poetry ==
Yaska is the founder of a literary school that focuses more on local poetic traditions, using a decasyllabic meter and a caesura between two rhyming hemistiches. This composition was common in folk poetry in Ardalan. Khana Qubadi would become a major poet in this school.

=== Poem, Yaska asks ===
A poem by Yaska, translated to English in 2005:

O, my Lord! Let him be free!

Let my beloved one be freed by force
From this prison,
I will leave it to ancient wisdom to rescue him.
O, Lord, let him find refuge with Imam Reza
Let there be an answer to his prayers
Let the hand of power be his protector!
O, my Prophet, what inhumanity is this
That my beloved one has to suffer so long in prison?
O my Lord, by your power he will be free,
Your mercy is great!
Let it be no less
Should you free him from prison!
He shall return to his past happiness
And be with the fairest of girls
Tattooed with the Autumn crocus.
Then shall we sit together and tell him

Our tales of all that has passed!

— 327, F.41a
