= List of Kurdish philosophers =

The following is a list of Kurdish philosophers.

== 11th Century ==
- Ali Hariri
- Al-Mawardi
- Sheikh Adi ibn Musafir

== 12th Century ==
- Ali Hariri
- Al-Mawardi
- Fexredîn
- Shihab al-Din Suhrawardi

== 13th Century ==
- Ibn al-Salah
- Ibn al-Mustawfi
- Ibn Khallikan
- Abu'l-Fida
- Al-Shahrazuri

== 14th Century ==
- Ibn al-Jazari
- Zain al-Din al-'Iraqi

== 15th Century ==
- Mela Hesenê Bateyî
- Mala Pareshan

== 16th Century ==
- Malaye Jaziri
- Sharaf Khan Bidlisi
- Ali Taramakhi

== 17th Century ==
- Ahmad Khani
- Faqi Tayran
- Mustafa Besarani

== 18th Century ==
- Khâlid-i Baghdâdî
- Khana Qubadi

== 19th Century ==
- Abdullah Cevdet
- Mahmud Bayazidi
- Mawlawi Tawagozi
- Nalî
- Mastoureh Ardalan
- Abdullah Cevdet
- Riza Talabani
- Mulla Effendi
- Wafayi
- Mahwi

== 20th Century ==
- Said Nursî
- Baba Mardoukh Rohanee
- Qanate Kurdo
- Muhammad Amin Zaki
- Abdul Karim Mudarris
- Muhammad Kurd Ali
- Abdurrahman Sharafkandi
- Celadet Bedir Khan

== 21st Century ==
- Saladdin Ahmed Bahozde
