= Abdurrahman Sharafkandi =

Iranian Kurdish writer, lexicographer, and linguist

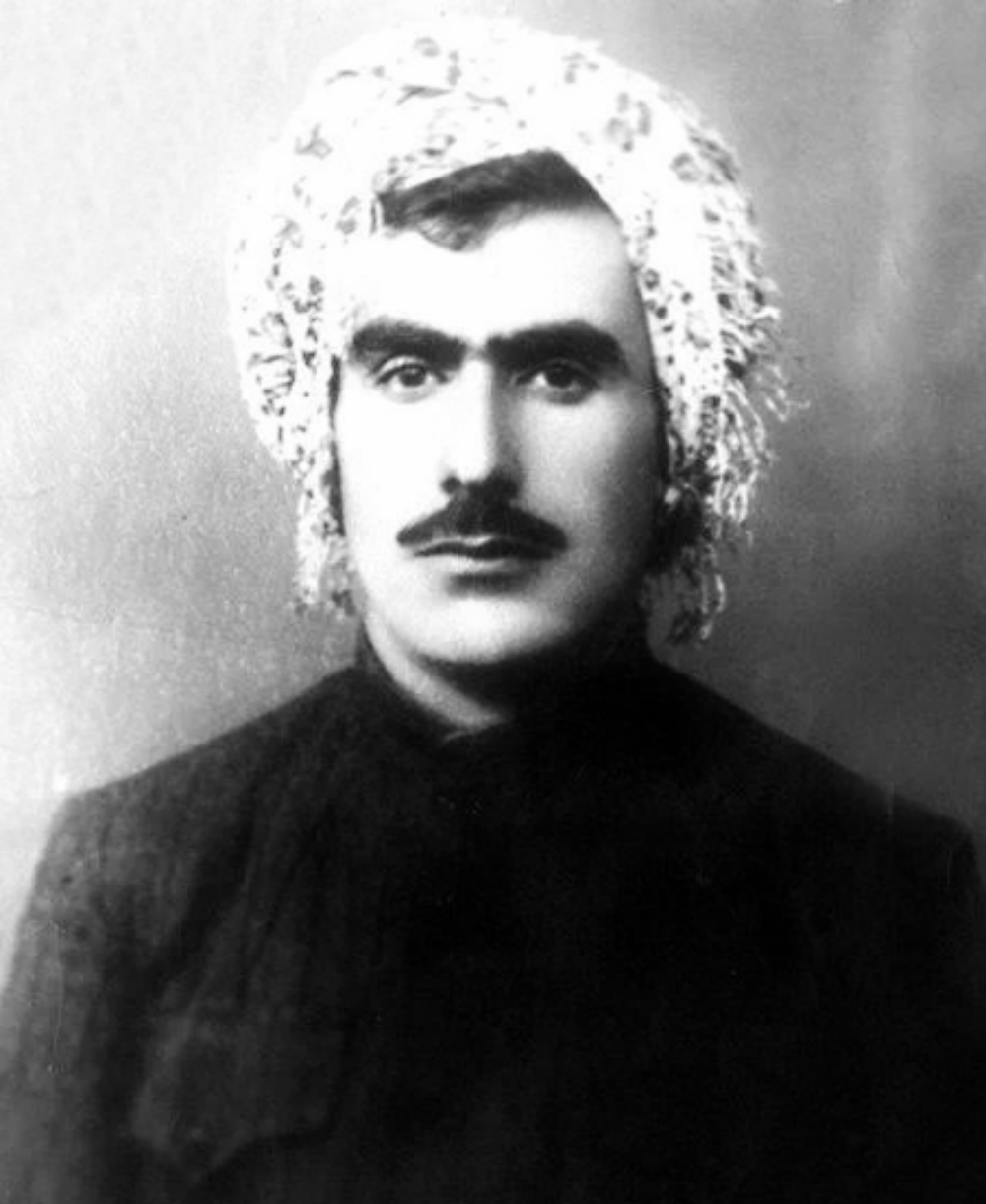
- Sharafkandi during the early years of the Republic of Mahabad
- Born: April 14, 1921; Mahabad, Iran
- Died: February 21, 1991 (aged 69); Karaj, Iran
- Occupations: Writer, poet, lexicographer, linguist, translator
- Writing career
- Notable awards: Order of Barzani

Abdurrahman Sharafkandi (Kurdish: ھەژار, romanized: Hejar; Persian: هژار; 14 April 1921 – 21 February 1991), better known by his pen name Hejar or Hazhar, was an Iranian Kurdish writer, poet, lexicographer, linguist, and translator. He was born in Mahabad, Iran.

He was the elder brother of the Kurdish politician Sadegh Sharafkandi (1938–1992), who served as the second Secretary-General of the Kurdistan Democratic Party of Iran (KDPI).

== Biography ==
Hejar was born in Mahabad in northwestern Iran. He began religious studies during his childhood, but was forced to abandon them after the death of his father when he was 17 years old. Taking custody of his siblings, he then moved to Bukan, where his youngest brother, Sadegh Sharafkandi, was born in 1938. Around,1940, he began writing poetry in the Kurdish language. Through his reading, he came under the influence of prominent Kurdish poets such as Melayê Cizîrî, Ahmad Khani, Wafaei, and Haji Qadir Koyi.

He became involved in the Kurdish movement led by Qazi Muhammad and was appointed one of the official poets of the Republic of Mahabad in 1946. Following the fall of the republic, he went into exile. For nearly 30 years, he lived in several countries, including Iraq, Syria, Lebanon, and Egypt. In Iraq, he joined the Kurdish nationalist movement led by Mustafa Barzani, with whom he developed a close friendship.

After the collapse of the movement in 1975, Hejar returned to Iran and settled in Karaj, where he lived until his death on 21 February 1991. He was buried in Mahabad.

== Works ==
Hejar was one of the most prolific Kurdish writers of the 20th century. He authored 24 books and produced numerous literary and scholarly works. Among his major contributions were an edited and annotated edition of the poetry of Melayê Cizîrî in Sorani, translations of works by Ehmedê Xanî into Sorani Kurdish, a translation of the Quran into Kurdish, and the compilation of one of the first Kurdish–Persian dictionaries published in Iran. He also translated the poetry of Omar Khayyam into Kurdish while attempting to preserve the original poetic rhythm and style.

One of Hejar's best-known poems, Forever a Kurd, was translated into English by Tyler Fisher and Haidar Khezri and included in Essential Voices: Poetry of Iran and Its Diaspora (Green Linden Press, 2021), p. 133.

== Books ==
- Alekok
- Vergêra Mem û Zîn bi Soranî – a translation of Mem û Zîn from Kurmanji into Sorani
- A translation of the Sharafnama from Persian into Sorani Kurdish
- Dîwana Helbesta Bo Kurdistan – a collection of poems
- Çarînekânî Xeyam – a translation of the quatrains of Omar Khayyam from Persian into Kurdish
- Henbane Borîne – a Kurdish–Persian dictionary
- Vergêra Quranê bi Kurdî – a translation of the Quran into Kurdish
- A translation of The Canon of Medicine by Avicenna from Arabic into Persian
- Şerha Dîwana Melayê Cizîrî – an edited and annotated edition of the poetry of Melayê Cizîrî
- Sifirê Bêbiranewe – a Kurdish translation of a work by Ali Shariati
- Çêştî Micêvir – an autobiography

== Articles ==
- Hitchins, Keith (2003). "HAŽĀR". Encyclopædia Iranica (Online ed.).
- Hazhar, Abdul Rahman. Le Mer Jiyan û Beserhatî Hejar, Bêjî Kurd ("On the Life and Biography of Hejar, the Kurdish Poet"), in Eiiubi & Smirnova, pp. 142–185, 1968.
- Hazhar, Abdul Rahman. Kurd û Serbexoyî Ziman, Govarî Korî Zaniyarî Kurd ("The Journal of the Kurdish Scientific Council"), vol. 2, part 1, pp. 280–320, 1974.

== See also ==
- List of Kurdish philosophers
