= Feqiyê Teyran =

Kurdish poet (1590–1660)

Feqiyê Teyran (born Mir Mihemed, Kurdish: فەقیێ تەیران, romanized: Feqiyê Teyran "Novice of Fowls", 1590–1660) was a Kurdish poet who wrote in Kurmanji. He is best known for his work Zembîlfiroş, and is also credited for writing the first literary account of the Battle of Dimdim which took place in 1609 and 1610. He is considered a pioneer in Kurdish Sufi literature and one of the founders of the Kurdish literary tradition with Ali Hariri, Melayê Cizîrî, Mela Huseynê Bateyî and Ehmedê Xanî.

== Biography ==
The first written information about Teyran stems from Mahmud Bayazidi in the mid-19th century. He was born in the village of Verezuz/Verezor, in Miks, Hakkâri of the Ottoman Empire and graduated from a madrasa. During his studies, he travelled to Hizan, Finik, Heşete and also to Cizre of Bohtan where he might have studied under Melayê Cizîrî. Instead of becoming a mullah, he continued to work on poetry as a profession and would wander around like a dervish and read his poems to the assemblies and madrasas he visited. His father was named Abdullah and Teyran plausibly came from a family of beys since he used the title mir. He died in Miks, but his tombstone was only found in 2013 in the village of Şandis in Hizan.

== Style and legacy ==
Poems of Teyran which have been described as 'colorful' have subsequently been used in Kurdish folk music. He wrote in plain language, used folklore elements and drew attention to mysticism. Subjects included divine love, knowledge, wisdom, female beauty, nature and the waḥdat al-wujūd. His poems were written in prosody and he preferred quatrains over couplets.

== Works ==
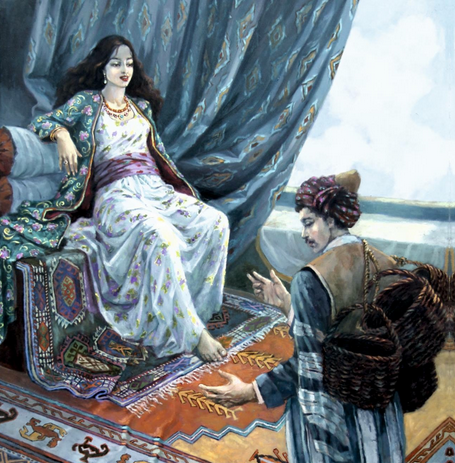
Zembîlfiroş, which would become his most important work and based on a true love story.

- Çîrroka Şêxê Sen’an (1621)
- Qiseya Bersîs
- Qewlê Hespê Reş
- Dilo Rabe (1631)
- Cizîrî (1640, written to Melayê Cizîrî)
- Zembîlfiroş
- Bersîsê Abid
- Beyta Dimdim

== See also ==
- List of Kurdish philosophers
