= Siyahposh =

Kurdish poet

Siyahposh or Siyahpush (سیاھپۆش Siyahpoş) is an 18th and 19th century Kurdish poet, who mostly wrote in Kurmanji. He has written Kurdish poetry in different forms including couplet and ghazal. His most well known work is the romance of Seyfulmiluk and Bediulcemal, which is a long Kurdish epic with Ghazals in the middle of the text. This style of combining Mathnawi with Ghazal makes his form of poetry unique in Kurdish literature.
