= Sharafkandi =

Sharafkandi is a surname. Notable people with the surname include:

- Abdurrahman Sharafkandi or Hajar, (Kurdish: Hejar, Persian: Hazhar) (1921–1991), Kurdish writer, poet, lexicographer, linguist, and translator
- Sadegh Sharafkandi (Kurdish: Sadiq Şerefkendî) (1938–1992), Kurdish political activist
