= Wafayi =

- وفایی
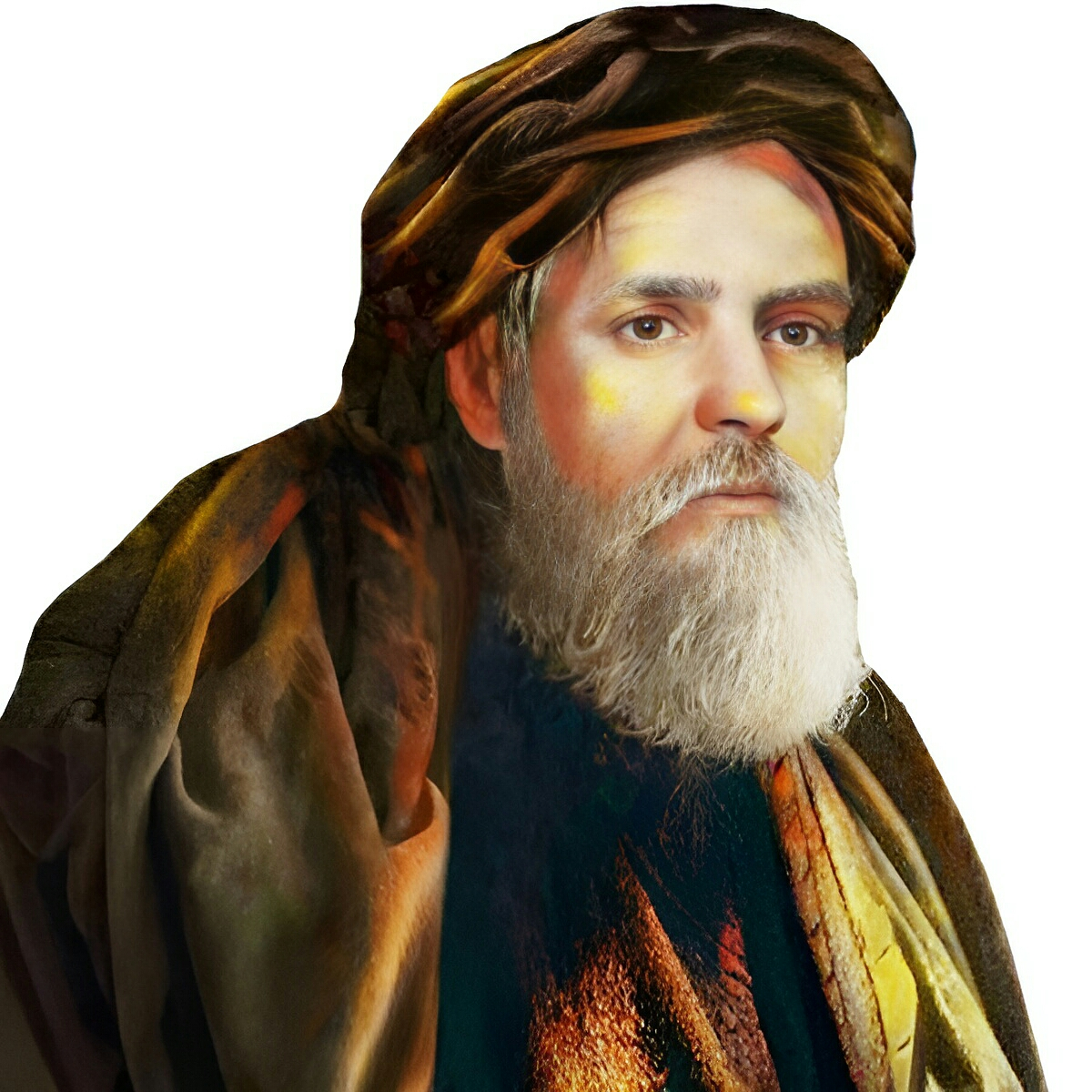
- Born: 1844; Mahabad, Qajar Iran
- Died: 1902 (aged 57–58); Mount Uhud, Ottoman Empire
- Occupation: Poet
- Writing career
- Language: Sorani Kurdish
- Genres: Classical poetry, Ghazal, Sufi poetry
- Subjects: Love, spirituality, mysticism, nature
- Notable works: Ghazals and lyrical poetry
- Literary movement: Kurdish classical literature

Wafaei or Wefayî, (Kurdish: وەفایی; 1844–1902), was a Kurdish poet. His real name was Abdurrehîm. He was born in Mahabad in present-day north-western Iran. He finished religious studies in Mahabad and became a cleric, and a teacher in the local school. He moved to Sulaimaniya in 1900 and stayed there for a while. He travelled to Mecca three times, the last one in 1902. He was accompanied by the Kurdish poet Piramerd. During his last pilgrimage, he became ill and died in Medina.

== Life ==
Limited historical information is available about Wafayi’s life. He lived during the late Ottoman period and belonged to the intellectual and literary environment of Kurdish-speaking regions where classical poetry and Sufi traditions were influential. His education is believed to have included religious and literary studies common among scholars and poets of the period. Wafayi became known for composing poetry in Sorani Kurdish using forms influenced by classical Persian and Kurdish literary traditions. His works circulated among Kurdish readers and later became part of Kurdish oral and musical culture.

== Works ==
He followed the classical rules of poetry in terms of rhyme and rhythm. He wrote most of his poems in the forms of Ghazal and Qasidah. The content of his poems are about Love and Nature. In some of his poems, he also mentions sufism. He was instrumental in introducing the Sulaimaniya sorani school of poetry (in particular Nalî's poetry) to the Kurds of Mukriyan region and western Iran. Wafayi was a disciple of Sheikh Ubeydullah and has written multiple poems for him.

== Literary style ==
Wafayi’s poetry was strongly influenced by Sufi thought and classical ghazal traditions. His poems frequently employed imagery involving gardens, roses, spring, nightingales, and the natural landscape of Kurdistan. Scholars have noted similarities between his poetic style and broader Persianate literary traditions that shaped Kurdish classical literature. His verse combined emotional lyricism with mystical symbolism and often addressed themes such as divine love, separation, beauty, and spiritual longing.

== Legacy ==
Wafayi is considered an important figure in the history of Kurdish literature, particularly within the Sorani poetic tradition. His poems continued to be recited and adapted in Kurdish literary and musical circles after his death. Some of his verses remain known among readers of classical Kurdish poetry and are occasionally performed in musical settings. Modern studies of Kurdish literature have identified Wafayi among the poets who contributed to preserving and developing Kurdish literary language during the nineteenth century.

== See also ==
- Nalî
- Mahwi
- Salim
- Kurdish literature
- List of Kurdish philosophers
- List of Kurdish scholars
