= Koyi =

Koyi may be,

- Haji Qadir Koyi, a Kurdish poet
- Koyi language
