= Zembîlfiroş =

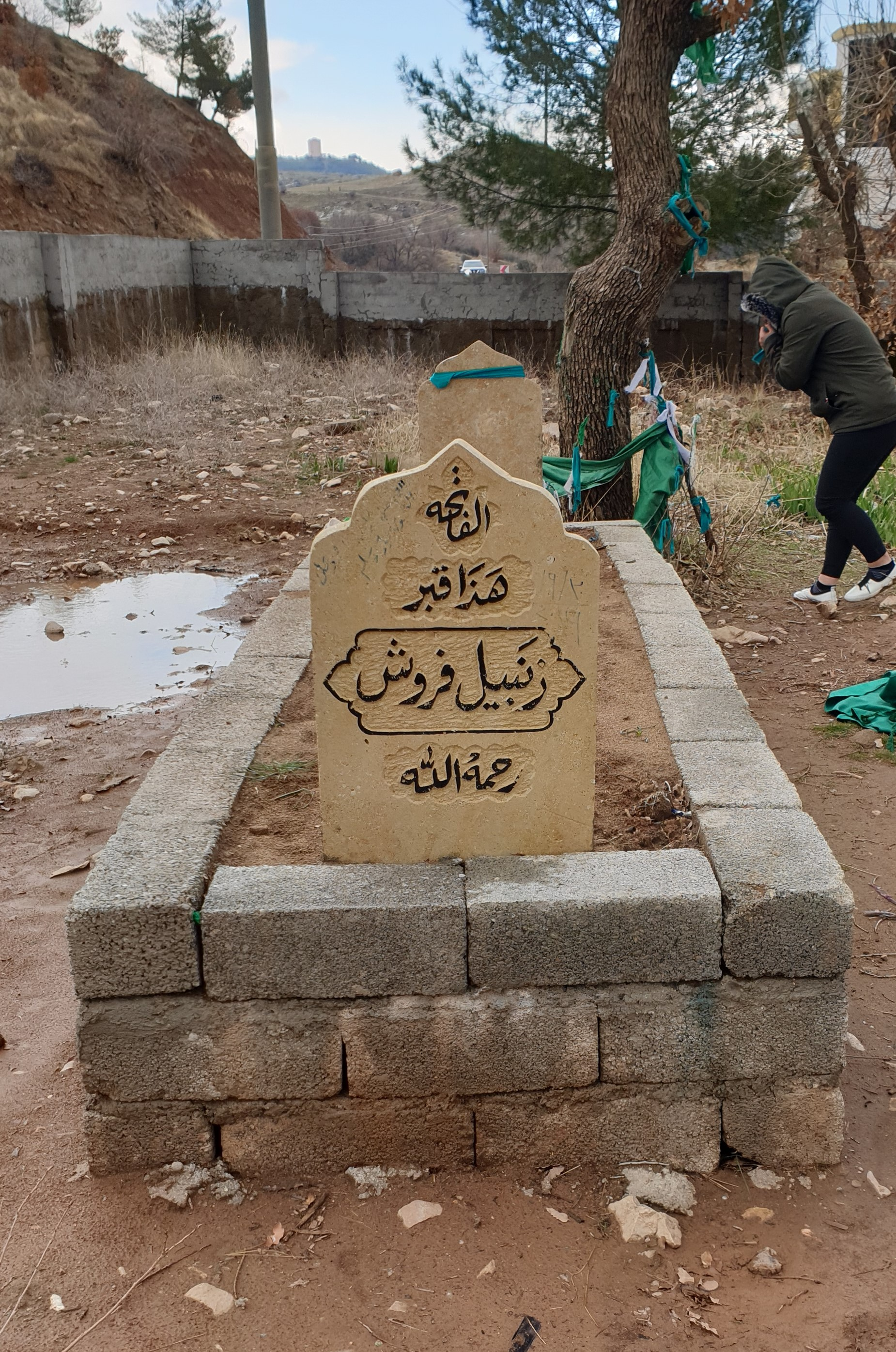
- Grave of Zambil Frosh in Batifa

- Location in Iraq
- Coordinates: 37.178378°N 42.982967°E
- Country: Iraq
- Region: Kurdistan Region
- Governorate: Dohuk Governorate
- District: Zakho District
- Sub-district: Batifa

Zembîlfiroş (Kurdish: زەمبیلفرۆش, Zembîlfiroş, lit. 'Basket seller') is a work by Kurdish writer and poet Feqiyê Teyran. It is believed to be based on a true story, transmitted from generation to generation through oral tradition, and is part of Kurdish mythology.

== Summary ==
The plot revolves around Prince Saed, son of Prince Hassan who ruled Farqîn near Amed. Prince Hassan was an evil governor and disliked by Prince Saed who migrated from Diyarbakır southward to Zakho. There he remained and began selling baskets.

== Gallery ==
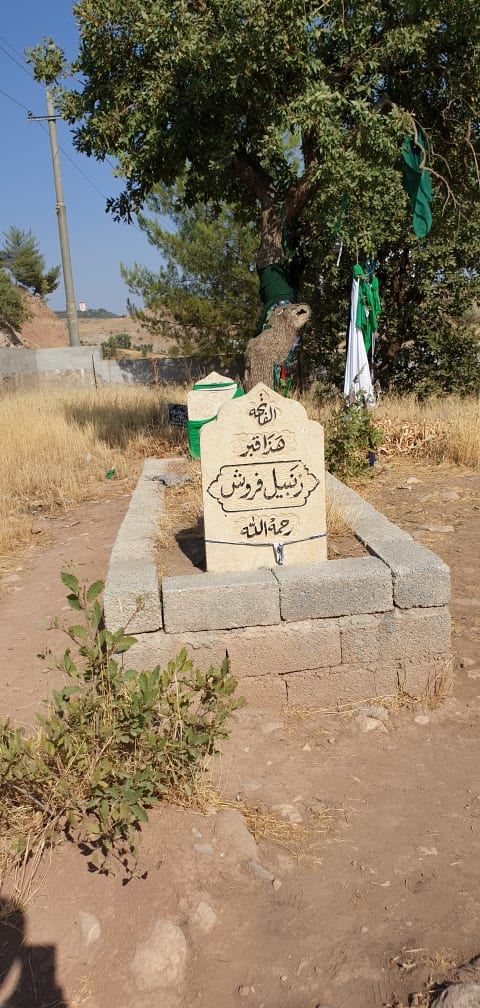
Grave of Prince Saed in Batifa

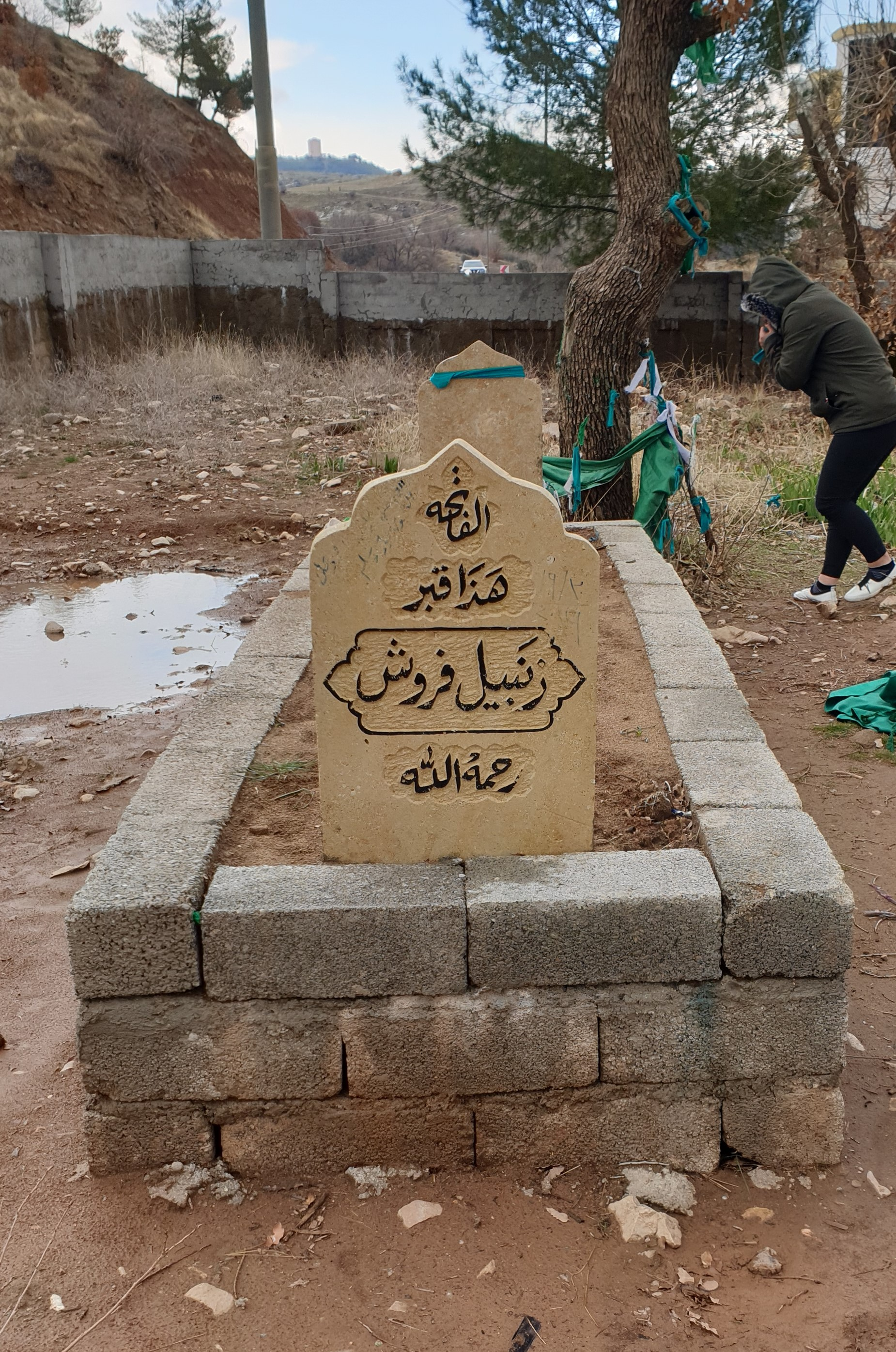
Grave of Prince Saed in Batifa
