= Hemin Mukriyani =

Kurdish poet and scholar (1921–1986)

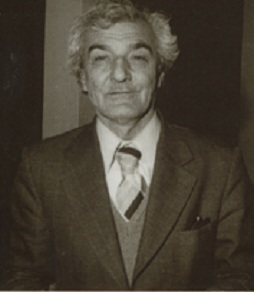
Hemin Mukriyani

Seyed Mohammad-Amin Shaikholislami Mukri (Sorani Kurdish: هێمن موکریانی), better known by his pen name Hemin Mukriyani or Hêmin Mukriyanî (1921–1986), was a Kurdish poet, journalist, translator, and literary critic.

He was born in the village of Lachin, northwest of Mahabad, in 1921. After attending Saadat Elementary School in Mahabad, he completed his religious education at the khanaqah of Shaikh Borhan in the village of Sharafkand. In 1942, Hemin joined the Komeley Jiyanewey Kurd (Society for the Revival of Kurdistan), one of the earliest modern Kurdish political organizations advocating Kurdish self-rule.

During the Second World War, following the Soviet occupation of parts of northwestern Iran, including much of Azerbaijan and Kurdish regions, the organization evolved into the Kurdistan Democratic Party of Iran. In 1946, the party proclaimed the Republic of Mahabad with Mahabad as its capital. Mukriyani, together with his close friend Abdurrahman Sharafkandi (Hejar), was recognized as one of the national poets of the republic. He also served as secretary to Haji Baba Sheikh, the prime minister of the republic.

Following the collapse of the Republic of Mahabad in December 1946, Hemin fled to Sulaymaniyah, in Iraqi Kurdistan, where he was briefly imprisoned before later being released. After the 11 March 1970 agreement, which temporarily ended the Iraqi–Kurdish conflict, he settled in Baghdad and became an active member of the Kurdish Scientific Academy.

== Works ==
Mukriyani contributed regularly to several Kurdish newspapers and magazines, including Kurdistan, Hawarî Kurd ("The Call of the Kurds"), Hawarî Niştiman ("The Call of the Homeland"), Girugalî Mindalan ("The Children's Babble"), Agir ("Fire"), and Halala ("Tulip"), the publication of the Kurdish Women's Association.

Following the Iranian Revolution in 1979, he established the Salahaddin Ayyubi Kurdish Publishing House in Urmia. Beginning in the spring of 1985, the publishing house issued the Kurdish-language literary journal Sirwe ("Breeze"). Mukriyani served as the journal's editor until his death in 1986.

== Books ==
1. Tarîk û Rûn ("Darkness and Light") – a collection of poems, 1974
2. Naley Judaî – a collection of poems, 1979
3. Paşerokî Mamosta Hêmin – a collection of articles, Mahabad, 1983

== See also ==
- List of Kurdish scholars
