= Balül =

Kurdish poet

Balül, Balool, or Bahlool (Kurdish: بەهلول) (who known as Balül y Madi, means Balül of Medes), (Kurdish: Baĺüĺ, Balûl, also Baĺüĺi Madî or Balûli Mahî) was a 9th-century Kurdish poet and religious scholar of the Yarsani faith, who wrote poems in the Gorani of the Kurdish language. His poems are considered to be one of the earliest examples of Kurdish literature and poetry. Balül and his fellow poet companions, including Baba Najoom, Baba Lura and Baba Rajab, all took a vital role in the revival and "renaissance" of the Yarsani faith.
