= Ferhad Shakely =

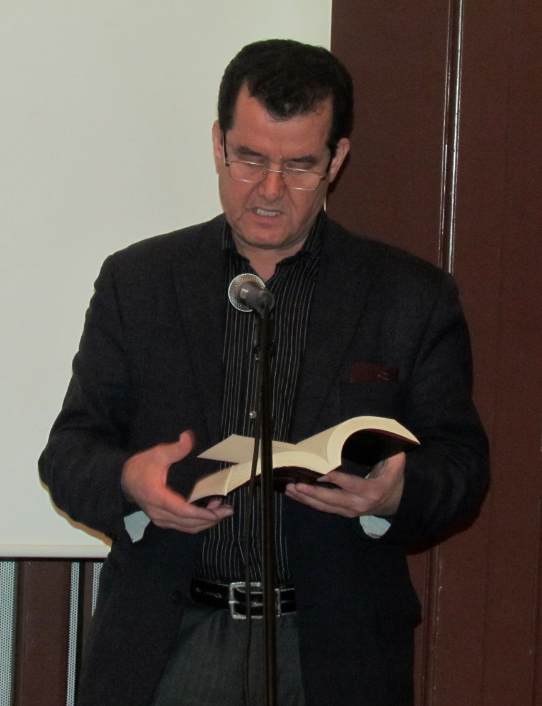
Farhad Shakely

Ferhad Shakely (born 1951) is a Kurdish writer, poet and researcher.

== Early life ==
Shakely was born in 1951 in the province of Kirkuk in Iraq. He began publishing poetry in 1968. In the early 1970s he studied in the Kurdish department of the Baghdad University. He joined the Kurdish national movement under the leadership of Mustafa Barzany in 1974 and went to Syria in 1975. He lived in Germany from Autumn 1977 to Summer 1978, efter which he settled in Sweden in the same year.

In 1981, after studying for one year at the Stockholm University, he went to Uppsala University where he studied Iranian languages. He published a Swedish-Kurdish Journal between 1985 and 1989 called Svensk-Kurdisk Journal.

Moreover, he published a literary Kurdish magazine, Mamosta-y Kurd (31 issues) between 1985 and 1996. In 1992, he published Kurdish nationalism in Mam and Zin of Ahmad Khani, a literary history that was translated into Swedish, Turkish and Arabic. Many of his poems have been translated into Persian, Arabic, Norwegian, Swedish, English, French, Italian, Icelandic and Danish.

== Dissertation ==
in 2024, he defended his dissertation at Uppsala University. The subject was Kurdish Sufi poet Malā-yē Jazīrī.

== Books ==
He has written 20 books, including:

1. Project of a secret coup, in Kurdish, 1973.
2. A river of light flowing from the red sun, in Kurdish, Beirut, 1977.
3. The smell of darkness (short stories), in Kurdish, Stockholm 1997.
4. Acclivity, in Kurdish, 1981.
5. Kurdish nationalism in Mam and Zin of Ahmad Khani, in English, Sweden, 1983. (Translated to several languages)
6. String, Sweden, 1985.
7. Kurdish artistic prose, in Swedish, Sweden, 1989.
8. I engrave your picture on the walls of my jail, in Kurdish 1994.
9. All my secrets are revealed, all your revelation is concealed, in Kurdish 2001, 2nd edition 2002, Sulaimani, Kurdistan, 3rd edition, Hawler Kurdistan 2006.
10. This Lamp Illuminates My Heart and Burns My Age, in Kurdish, Hawler, Kurdistan 2006.

=== Translations ===
1. Tuwan, Translation of the novel by Eva Boholm-Olsson, Pham Van Dôn, 28 pp., Kurdiska kulturförl, Stockholm, 1986. ISBN 91-86146-26-2
2. Alfons û cinawireke, Translation of the work by Gunilla Bergström, 29 pp., Kurdiska kulturförl., Stockholm, 1989. ISBN 91-86146-29-7. (Original title: Alfons och odjuret)
3. Ay filbaz, Alfuns Obiri!, Translation of the work by Gunilla Bergström, 25 pp., Kurdiska kulturförl, Stockholm, 1990. ISBN 91-86146-33-5. (Original title: Listigt, Alfons Åberg!)
4. Bahar-i Tazade, Translation of the work by Astrid Lindgren, 32 pp., Kurdiska kulturförl, Stockholm, 1990. (Original title: Vår i Bullerbyn)
5. Pipi, Kiçey Gorawîdirêj, Translation of the work by Astrid Lindgren, 24 pp., Kurdiska kulturförl, Stockholm, 1991. ISBN 91-86146-36-X (Original title: Känner du Pippi Långstrump?)
6. Evgeni Pasternak, Translation of the work by Boris Pasternak, 55 pp., Kulturfören. Sverige-Kurdistan, 1995. ISBN 91-972384-6-5
7. Tûte paqijiyê dike(Tûte gisik dedat), Translation of the work by Gunilla Wolde ( with Ali Çîftçî), 25 pp., Spånga : Apec, 1996. ISBN 91-89014-01-4 (Original title: Totte städar)
8. Tûte xanî çêdike. Translation of the work by Gunilla Wolde, (with Ahmed Cantekin), 25 pp., Spånga : Apec, 1996. ISBN 91-89014-02-2 (Original title: Totte bygger)
9. Pariya., Translation of the work by August Strindberg, 60 pp., Malmö : Rosengård, 2000. ISBN 91-89489-11-X (Original title: Paria)
10. String, Translation of the poem by Abdurrahman Ahmad Wahab & Jessica Johnston, excerpt, Zoland Poetry Volume 2, 2008. ISBN 978-1-58195-224-7.

== See also ==
- List of Kurdish scholars
