= Arezu Jahani-Asl =

Iranian-born Canadian neurobiologist

- Born: c. 1970s Mahabad, East Kurdistan, Iran
- Education: University of Toronto (BSc); University of Ottawa (MSc, PhD); Harvard Medical School (Post-doc)
- Employers: University of Ottawa; McGill University; Jewish General Hospital
- Known for: Discovery of the OSMR gene's role in glioblastoma
- Spouse: Vahab D. Soleimani
- Children: 1

Arezu Jahani-Asl (born c. 1970s) is an Iranian-born Kurdish physician, neurobiologist and research scientist based in Montreal, Canada. She is the Canada research chair in neurobiology of disease at the University of Ottawa, a professor of medicine at McGill University, and a principal investigator at the Lady Davis Institute for Medical Research at the Jewish General Hospital in Quebec. She is best known for her research into glioblastoma, a highly aggressive and fatal form of brain cancer.

== Early life and education ==
Jahani-Asl was born in Mahabad, East Kurdistan, Iran. Her youth was marked by political turmoil; during her childhood, several of her family members, including her cousins and uncles, were executed, and her father was imprisoned for political activism. At the age of 17, following her father's release, her family fled Iran and spent two years as asylum seekers in Turkey before immigrating to Canada.

After settling in Toronto, she attended the University of Toronto while adapting to a new language and culture. She later pursued higher education in Ottawa and Montreal before completing a postdoctoral fellowship at Harvard Medical School under the mentorship of fellow Kurdish professor Azad Bonni.

== Career and research ==
Jahani-Asl's research focuses on the molecular mechanisms of brain tumor progression. She is best known for her research into glioblastoma, a highly aggressive and fatal form of brain cancer. She served as the lead author of a significant study published in Nature Neuroscience which identified the OSMR gene as a primary driver of glioblastoma tumor growth. Her laboratory at McGill University works on developing compounds to suppress this gene, aiming to find treatments for tumors that are resistant to standard chemotherapy and radiation.

In 2024, she and her team demonstrated that edaravone, a drug usually used to treat ALS, could be used to treat glioblastomas.

She is the Canada research chair in neurobiology of disease at the University of Ottawa, a professor of medicine at McGill University, and a principal investigator at the Lady Davis Institute for Medical Research at the Jewish General Hospital in Quebec.

== Personal life ==
Jahani-Asl resides in Montreal with her husband, professor Vahab D. Soleimani, and their son. She has cited her Kurdish heritage and the hardships she faced as an immigrant as the source of her persistence in academia. She has also expressed public admiration for the resistance of the people of Kobani.

== Publications ==
- Irrcher, I.; Aleyasin, H.; Seifert, E.L.; Hewitt, S.J.; Chhabra, S.; Phillips, M.; Lutz, A.K.; Rousseaux, M.W.C.; Bevilacqua, L.; Jahani-Asl, A.; Callaghan, S.; MacLaurin, J.G.; Winklhofer, K.F.; Rizzu, P.; Rippstein, P. (October 1, 2010). "Loss of the Parkinson's disease-linked gene DJ-1 perturbs mitochondrial dynamics". Human Molecular Genetics. 19 (19): 3734–3746. doi:10.1093/hmg/ddq288. ISSN 1460-2083.
- Sharanek, Ahmad; Burban, Audrey; Laaper, Matthew; Heckel, Emilie; Joyal, Jean-Sebastien; Soleimani, Vahab D.; Jahani-Asl, Arezu (August 17, 2020). "OSMR controls glioma stem cell respiration and confers resistance of glioblastoma to ionizing radiation". Nature Communications. 11 (1). Springer Science and Business Media. doi:10.1038/s41467-020-17885-z. ISSN 2041-1723. PMC 7431428.
