= Mistefa Bêsaranî =

Kurdish Sufi and poet (1642–1701)

Mistefa Bêsaranî (Kurdish: مستەفا بێسارانی, romanized: Mistefa Bêsaranî, 1642–1701), was a Kurdish Sufi and poet who wrote in Gorani. He was from the village of Bêseran of Ardalan.

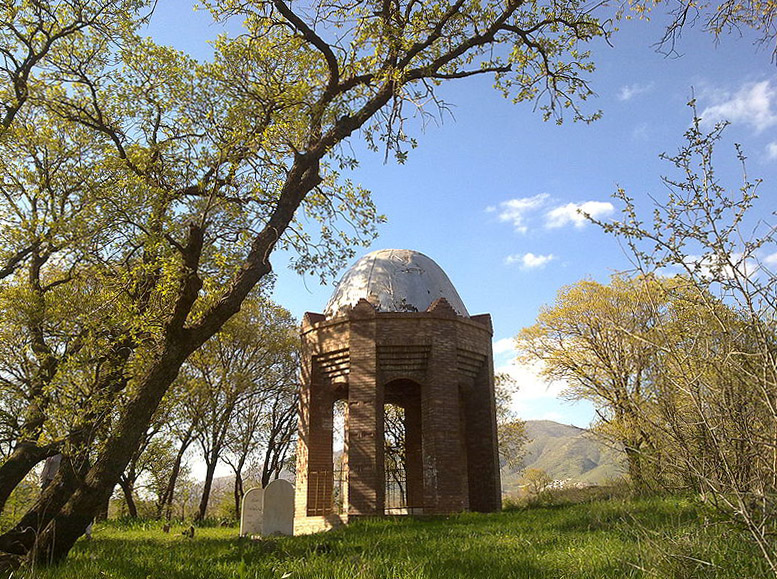
Shrine of Mistefa Bêsaranî

== Biography ==
Besarani was born in 1642 in Bêseran, Sarvabad and studied jurisprudence, the Quran, and later on Ijtihad and Fatwa. No information exist on his childhood and he did not write about it either, but developed a unique talent for science and travelled around the region including to Sanandaj and Kermanshah to study jurisprudence. After his studies, he returned to his home village spending the rest of his life working on agriculture, animal husbandry, teaching, preaching and guiding people. In his diwans, he wrote about God, nature, love and advice. Bêsaranî would influence Mawlawi Tawagozi and his poetry.

== See also ==
- List of Kurdish philosophers
- List of Kurdish scholars
