= Ehmedê Xanî =

Kurdish intellectual and nationalist (1650–1707)

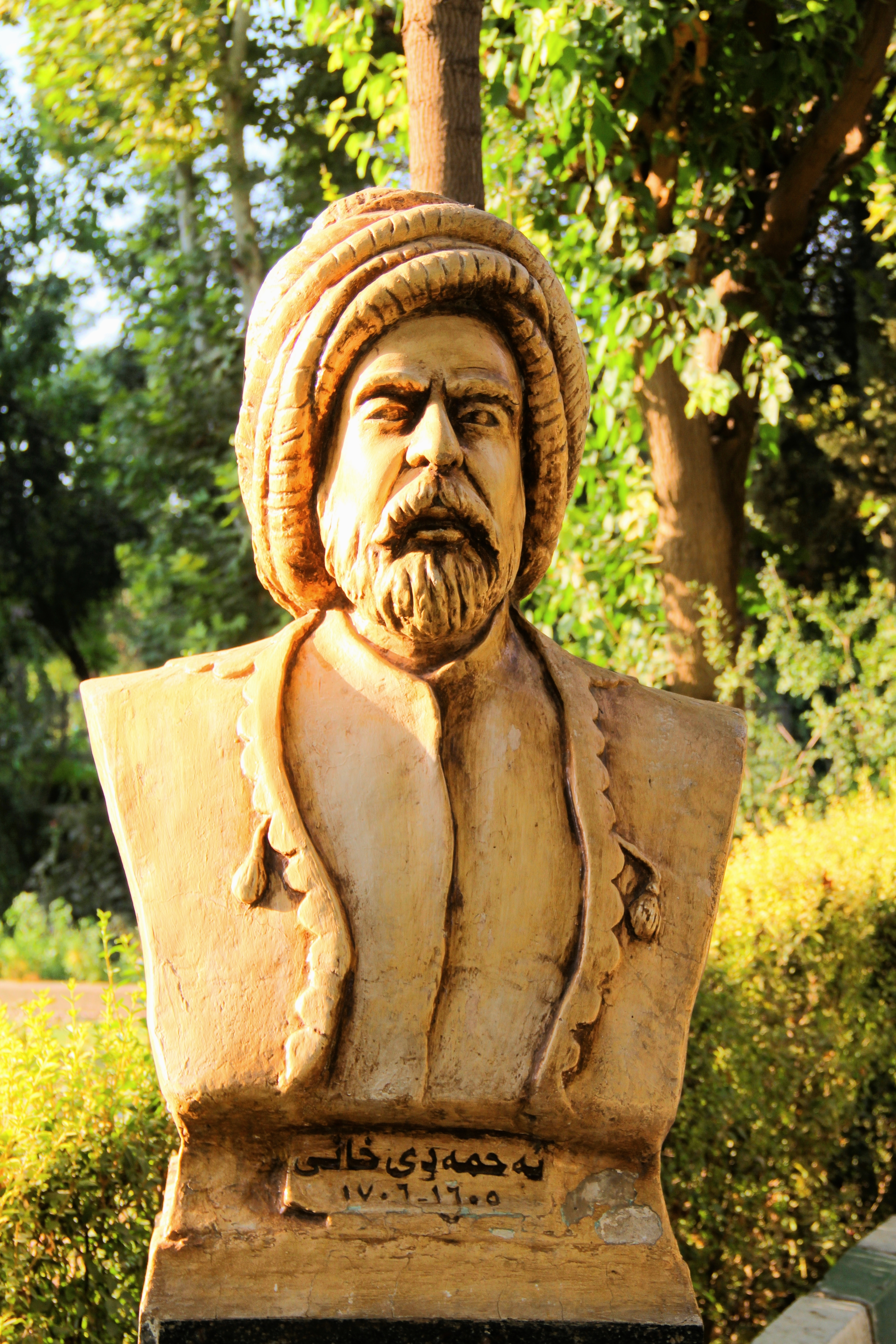
- A bust of Ehmedê Xanî in Kurdistan Region
- Born: 1650; Khani, Hakkari
- Died: 1707 (aged 56–57); Bayazid
- Occupations: Intellectual, scholar, poet, writer
- Writing career
- Period: 17th century
- Notable work: Mem and Zin

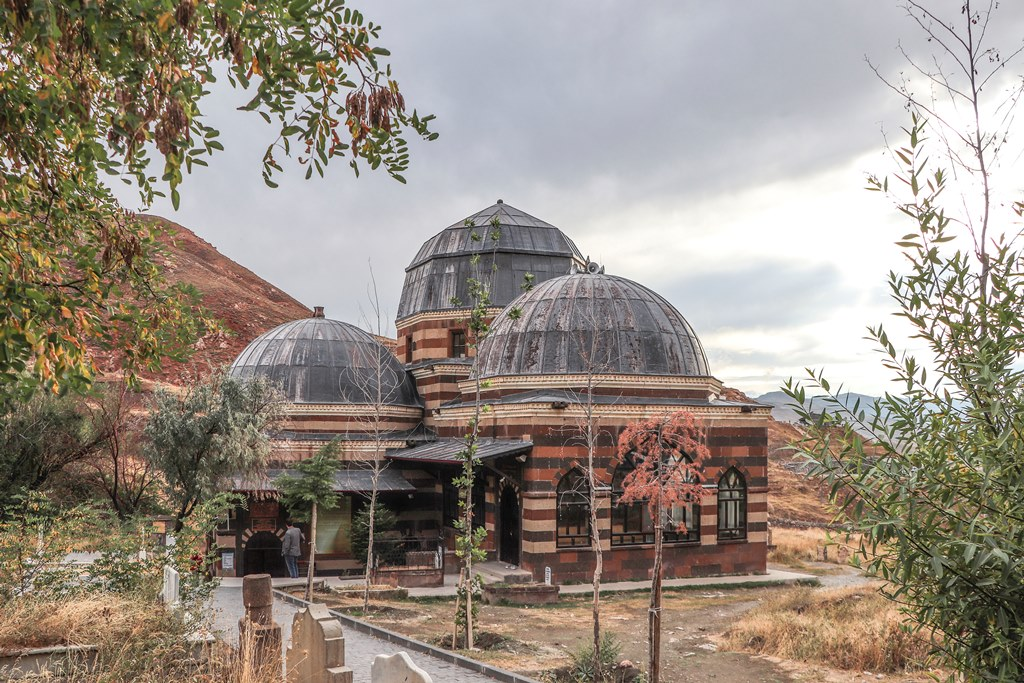
Ehmedê Xanî's türbe (mausoleum) in Bayazid

Ehmedê Xanî (ئەحمەدێ خانی, also Ahmad-e Khani) was a Kurdish intellectual, scholar, mystic and poet who is viewed by some as the founder of Kurdish nationalism. He was born in the Hakkâri region in 1650 and died in Bayazid in 1707.

Xanî's most important work is Mem and Zin, a long romantic epic which is sometimes viewed as the Kurdish national epic. It is the most famous work of Kurdish literature among both Kurds and non-Kurds. His other important works include Nûbihara Biçûkan, a versified Arabic-Kurdish vocabulary, and Eqîdeya Îmanê, a religious poem. These works were studied in Kurdish schools from the time of Khani towards the 1930s.

Xanî admired the Kurmanji poets Melayê Cizîrî and Feqiyê Teyran. Joyce Blau called him the spiritual son of Cizîrî, Teyran and Ali Hariri.

== Biography ==
Xanî was born in the village of Khan in the region of Hakkari (in modern-day southeastern Turkey) in 1650. He received his education in religious schools and went to study in different parts of Kurdistan. He wrote his first poem at the age of fourteen and became a clerical secretary at the princely court of Bayazid at the age of twenty. It is possible that he also visited Syria and Egypt. There are indications in his poetry that he lived for a long time in the city of Jazira (Cizre), which was the capital of the Kurdish principality of Bohtan. He completed the romantic epic Mem and Zin, his most famous work, at the age of 44. He worked as a teacher in Bayazid in the last years of his life. Most scholars concur that he died in Bayazid in 1707.

== Nationalism ==
Xanî is sometimes considered the founder of Kurdish nationalism or viewed as a proto-nationalist. He expressed his negative opinion of Arabs, Persians, and Armenians in his poetry. In the introductory chapters of his epic poem Mem and Zin, he did not devote parts of the introduction to praising the rulers of his time, which was typical in classical Oriental literature. Instead, he wrote of the subjugation of the Kurds and the occupation of Kurdistan by the Ottomans and the Safavids, as a result of which the Kurds lacked their own independent state with a Kurdish monarch. Such a ruler could liberate Kurds from the 'vile'. He also believed that an independent Kurdistan could safeguard the Kurdish language for scientific and intellectual purposes. He wrote:

Ger dê hebûya me ittifaqek
Vêk ra bikira me inqiyadek
Rum û ʻEreb û ʻEcem temamî
Hemiyan ji me ra dikir xulamî
Tekmîl dikir me dîn û dewlet
Tehsîl dikir me ʻilm û hikmet
Temyîz dibûn ji hev meqalat
Mumtaz dibûn xwedankemalat

Translation:

If we could form a union by agreement
And to that union we all submitted
It would force the Turks, Arabs and Persians all together
To show deference to us [alt. would become our servants]
Then we would perfect religion and State
We would be able to cultivate knowledge and wisdom
Then the hodgepodge would be sorted
Those with excellence would become distinguished

— Translation by Mücahit Bilici

According to Ferhad Shakely, many later Kurdish poets, such as Haji Qadir Koyi (1824–1897), followed Xanî's example and lauded the struggle of the Kurds for liberty. In the 20th century, Mem and Zin was hailed as the earliest expression of Kurdish nationalism. This interpretation has been criticized by Hakan Özoğlu, who argues that "it is highly unlikely that Ahmed-i Hani sought a nation-state for the Kurds." According to Özoğlu, Xanî may have only had Kurmanji speakers in mind when writing. Martin van Bruinessen states that it is incorrect to call Xanî a nationalist, although his works "have played an important part in crucial phases of the Kurdish national movement." He writes, "Kurd in [Xanî's] period appears to refer only to the Kurdish tribes and a part of the urban aristocratic elite, but not to the non-tribal peasantry." In van Bruinessen's view, if Xanî conceived of a state when wishing for a Kurdish king, it was not of a Kurdish nation-state but a multi-ethnic state where Kurds would conquer their neighbors. Leonard Michael Koff argues that Xanî wrote of Kurdish moral and cultural independence but understood the impossibility of political independence.

== Works ==
- Mem û Zîn (Mem and Zin)
- Eqîdeya Îmanê (The Path of Faith)
- Eqîdeya Îslamê (Basics of Islam)
- Nûbihara Biçûkan (The Spring of Children)
- Erdê Xweda (Astronomy and Geography book)
- Dîwana Helbestan

== See also ==
- List of Kurdish philosophers
