= Mahabad =

City in West Azerbaijan province, Iran

Mahabad Persian: مهاباد Sorani Kurdish: مەهاباد
- City
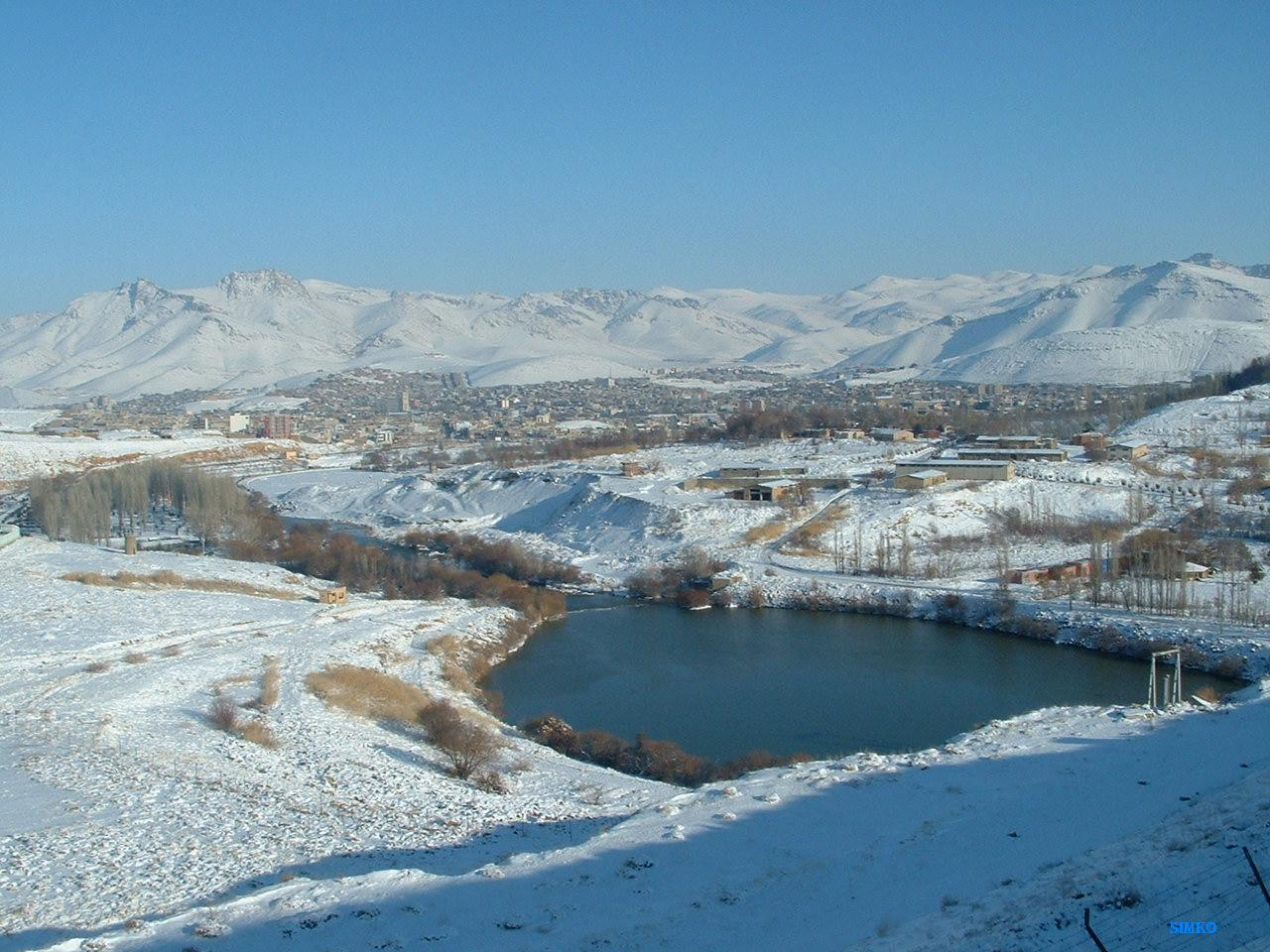
- The Mahabad River
- Interactive map of Mahabad
- Location within Iran
- Coordinates: 36°46′04″N 45°44′02″E
- Country: Iran
- Province: West Azerbaijan
- County: Mahabad
- District: Central

Population (2016)
  - Total: 168,393
- Time zone: UTC+3:30 (IRST)
- Area code: 044
- Website: www.mohabad-ag.ir

Mahabad (Persian: مهاباد) (Note: Sorani Kurdish: مەهاباد; romanized in Kurdish as Mehabad; also known as Mihābād and Muhābād; and formerly Savojbolagh (Persian: ساوجبلاغ)) is a city in the Central District of Mahabad County, West Azerbaijan province, Iran, serving as capital of both the county and the district. Due to its historic significance to Kurdish nationalism, Mahabad is seen as the capital of Iranian Kurdistan by the Unrepresented Nations and Peoples Organization.

== Etymology ==
Mahabad first became the name of the city after World War I, during the reign of Reza Shah (r. 1925–1941). Before that, it was known as Savojbolagh, a Persian corruption of the Turkic word soghuk bulak (meaning "cold spring"). The Kurdish version was Sablagh.

== History ==
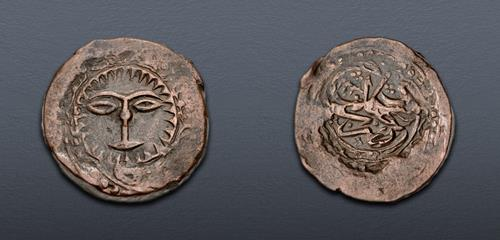
Coin of Fath-Ali Shah Qajar (r. 1797-1834), minted in Savojbolagh (Mahabad), dated 1814/5. Civic copper issue

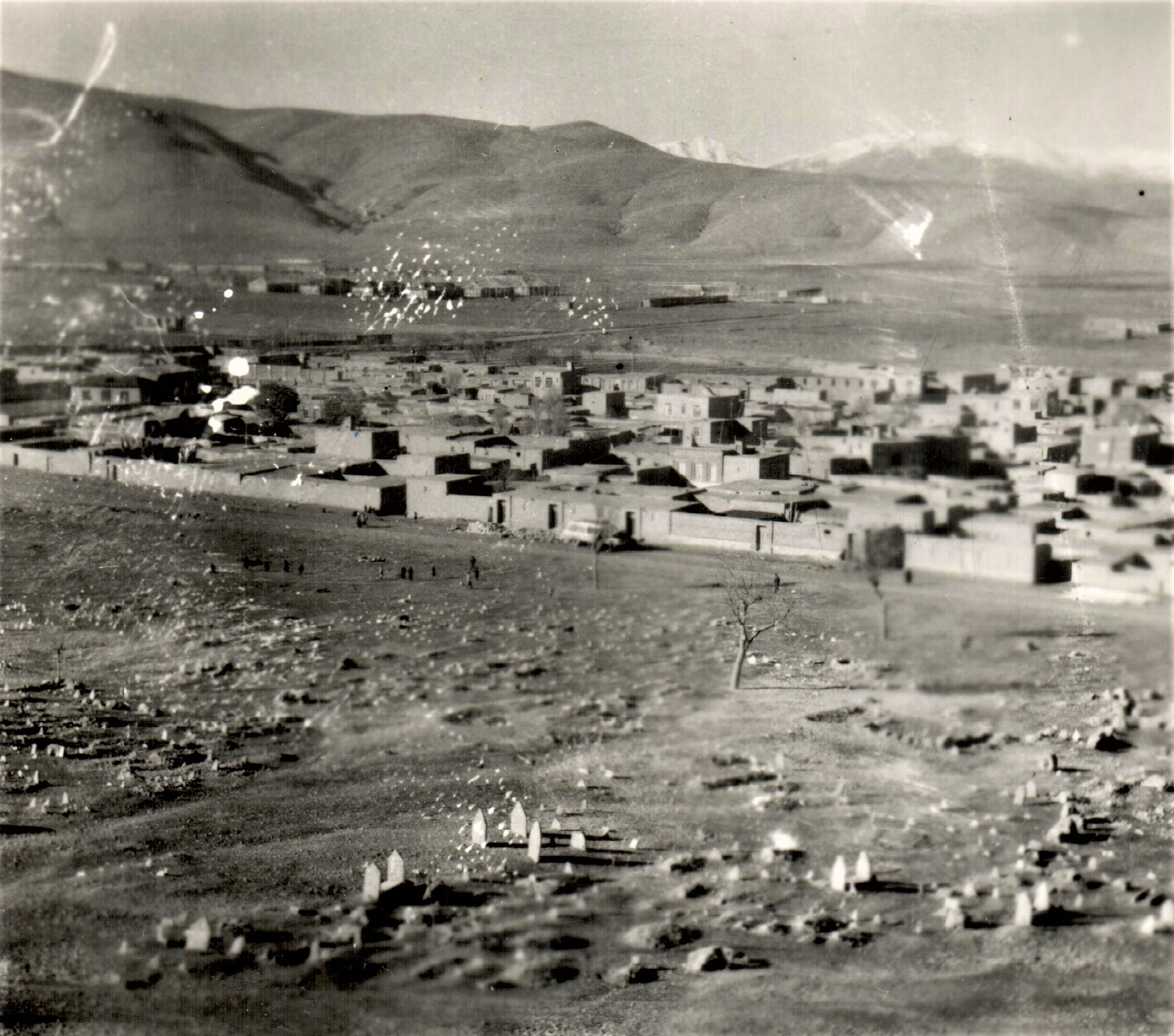
Panoramic view of Mahabad, January 1959

Savojbolagh is first attested in the 16th century, during the Safavid era. Mukri Kurds participated in several wars between the Safavid dynasty and Ottoman Empire, and gained more predominance. In the 17th century, Savojbolagh became the seat of Mukri principality (known as Mukriyān in Sorani Kurdish and Mokriyān in Persian). Many believe Budaq Sultan Mukri who built Savojbolagh's congregational mosque is the founder of the current town.

=== Republic of Mahabad ===
Mahabad was the capital of the short-lived Republic of Mahabad, which was declared independent on 1 January 1946, under the leadership of Kurdish nationalist Qazi Muhammad.

The republic received strong support from the Soviet Union, which had occupied northern Iran following the Anglo-Soviet invasion of Iran during World War II. It included the majority Kurdish-speaking towns of Bukan, Piranshahr, Sardasht and Oshnavieh.

After an agreement brokered by the United States, the Soviets agreed to leave Iran, and sovereignty was restored to Mohammad Reza Shah in 1947. The Shah ordered an invasion of the Republic of Mahabad shortly afterwards, the leaders of the republic including Qazi Muhammad were arrested and executed. Qazi Muhammad was hanged on 31 March 1947. At the behest of Archibald Roosevelt Jr., who argued that Qazi had been forced to work with the Soviets out of expediency, U.S. ambassador to Iran George V. Allen urged the Shah not to execute Qazi or his brother, only to be reassured: "Are you afraid I'm going to have them shot? If so, you can rest your mind. I am not." Roosevelt later recounted that the order to have the Qazis killed was likely issued "as soon as our ambassador had closed the door behind him," adding with regard to the Shah: "I never was one of his admirers".

=== Islamic Republic of Iran ===
On 7 May 2015, the people of the city rioted following the unexplained death on 4 May 2015 of Farinaz Khosravani, a hotel chambermaid. Khosravani fell to her death from a fourth-floor window of the Tara hotel, the hotel where she worked. Anger mounted following reports that Khosravani died attempting to escape an official who was threatening to rape her. The rioters reportedly set fire to the hotel where Khosravani worked.

== Demographics ==
=== Language and religion ===
Most of Mahabad is populated by Kurds who follow the Sunni branch of Islam. Besides Kurdish, many speak Persian and Azeri Turkic as well. Neo-Aramaic-speaking Jews originally used to inhabit the city as well.

=== Population ===
At the time of the 2006 National Census, the city's population was 133,324 in 31,000 households. The following census in 2011 counted 147,268 people in 38,393 households. The 2016 census measured the population of the city as 168,393 people in 47,974 households.

=== Employment ===
In 1977, the employment rate of the city was 95.8%, much higher than the provincial average of 86%. However, after the Iranian revolution of 1979 the employment rate fell and reached 88.8% in 1997.

== Geography ==
=== Location ===
The city lies south of Lake Urmia in a narrow valley 1,300 metres above sea level.

Mahabad County is bordered by the counties of Urmia and Miandoab to the north; by the counties of Piranshahr and Naqadeh to the west and the northwest respectively; by the county of Sardasht to the southwest; and by the county of Bukan to the east.

=== Climate ===
Climate data for Mahabad (1991–2020, extremes since 1985)
Month	Jan	Feb	Mar	Apr	May	Jun	Jul	Aug	Sep	Oct	Nov	Dec	Year
Record high °C (°F)	15.3 (59.5)	20.0 (68.0)	26.4 (79.5)	30.8 (87.4)	35.0 (95.0)	40.6 (105.1)	42.6 (108.7)	41.6 (106.9)	38.8 (101.8)	32.4 (90.3)	25.4 (77.7)	21.8 (71.2)	42.6 (108.7)
Mean daily maximum °C (°F)	4.4 (39.9)	7.2 (45.0)	12.7 (54.9)	18.5 (65.3)	24.1 (75.4)	30.3 (86.5)	33.5 (92.3)	33.7 (92.7)	29.5 (85.1)	22.2 (72.0)	13.0 (55.4)	6.8 (44.2)	19.7 (67.5)
Daily mean °C (°F)	0.1 (32.2)	2.2 (36.0)	7.1 (44.8)	12.4 (54.3)	17.4 (63.3)	23.0 (73.4)	26.2 (79.2)	25.9 (78.6)	21.5 (70.7)	15.0 (59.0)	7.4 (45.3)	2.3 (36.1)	13.4 (56.1)
Mean daily minimum °C (°F)	−3.8 (25.2)	−2.1 (28.2)	2.1 (35.8)	6.5 (43.7)	10.2 (50.4)	14.3 (57.7)	17.9 (64.2)	17.4 (63.3)	13.2 (55.8)	8.4 (47.1)	2.8 (37.0)	−1.5 (29.3)	7.1 (44.8)
Record low °C (°F)	−19.4 (−2.9)	−19.4 (−2.9)	−14.8 (5.4)	−4.6 (23.7)	1.6 (34.9)	7.8 (46.0)	5.4 (41.7)	9.2 (48.6)	4.4 (39.9)	−0.6 (30.9)	−11.4 (11.5)	−18.8 (−1.8)	−19.4 (−2.9)
Average precipitation mm (inches)	45.1 (1.78)	43.2 (1.70)	57.0 (2.24)	57.7 (2.27)	32.3 (1.27)	4.4 (0.17)	2.3 (0.09)	0.9 (0.04)	2.4 (0.09)	27.5 (1.08)	49.9 (1.96)	41.0 (1.61)	363.7 (14.32)
Average precipitation days (≥ 1.0 mm)	6.4	6.3	7.6	7.3	5.3	0.9	0.5	0.3	0.5	3.8	5.5	5.5	49.9
Average snowy days	6.6	4.3	1.6	0.3	0	0	0	0	0	0.1	1.0	3.3	17.2
Average relative humidity (%)	71.0	65.0	58.0	53.0	49.0	36.0	34.0	32.0	34.0	48.0	63.0	69.0	51.0
Average dew point °C (°F)	−5.7 (21.7)	−4.9 (23.2)	−2.7 (27.1)	0.5 (32.9)	2.9 (37.2)	3.2 (37.8)	4.9 (40.8)	4.1 (39.4)	1.6 (34.9)	0.8 (33.4)	−1.4 (29.5)	−4.2 (24.4)	−0.1 (31.8)
Mean monthly sunshine hours	140.0	163.0	202.0	227.0	288.0	355.0	367.0	346.0	299.0	237.0	173.0	140.0	2,937
Source 1: NOAA
Source 2: IRIMO(extremes 1985-1990), meteomanz(snow days 2000-2023, extremes since 2021)

== Culture ==
The prolific translator into Persian, Mohammad Ghazi, came from Mahabad. He translated more than 70 important literary works into Persian. Some poets and writers have hailed from this city in the 19th and 20th century. Wafaei (1844–1902), Hejar (Abdurrahman Sharfkandi) (1920–1990), Hêmin (Sayyed Moháammad Amini Shaykho-al-Eslam Mokri) (1920–1986), Abdorrahamn Zabihi (1920–1980) and Giw Mukriyani, all from Mahabad, are considered as the main writers and poets. The first Kurdish-Kurdish-Persian Dictionary in Iran was written by Hejar. Kurdistan's national poet was the title given to Hejar(along with Hêmin) during the short lived reign of the Republic of Mahabad in recognition of his poetry's service to the cause. After the fall of the Pahlavi dynasty in 1979, "Hêmin" set up the Salaha-al-Din Ayyubi Kurdish publishing house in Urmia, which publishes Sirwe (from spring 1985), a quarterly cultural magazine that Hêmin ran until his death in 1986 . The dialect of Mahabad, is adopted as the literary standard of Kurdish language in western Iran (which is very close to the standard "sorani" used in Iraqi Kurdistan).

== Transportation ==
By road, Mahabad is 122 kilometres away from the provincial capital Urmia, and 679 kilometres away from Tehran.

=== Railway ===
In 2013, Mahabad was connected to the national railway and a 40 kilometre route between the city and Miandoab was established. The project was inaugurated in the presence of then president Mahmoud Ahmadinejad.

=== Bus system ===
In 2000, the Mahabad bus service was inaugurated with five buses which operated three routes within the city. By 2007, the number of buses had reached 39 which operated nine routes.

== Sports ==
The biggest sports complex in Mahabad is the Azadi Sports Complex. The complex has a football ground which was built in 1973, a 2,000 seat covered arena, a wrestling hall, table tennis complex, weightlifting hall and a gymnastics hall.

=== Volleyball ===
Volleyball is the most popular sport in Mahabad and the city has several teams playing in the different levels of the Iranian league system. Mahabad's rise in volleyball dates back to the 1990s, when Farmandarie Mahabad became champions of the Iranian first division (second tier). In 1995, the team then went on to finish a record fourth in the Iranian Super League, however the team was dissolved only shortly after. Farhad Piroutpour is the most successful player to have come from Mahabad, he has been a member of the Iran national volleyball team since 2011.

In 2012, after two decades, Farmandarie Mahabad was re-established and began competing in the Iranian first division. In 2013, another team by the name of Shahrdari Mahabad was formed and started competing in the West Azerbaijan Super League.

== Notable people ==
- Pakhshan Azizi (born 1984), human rights activist
- Amir Hassanpour (1943-2017), scholar and researcher
- Arezu Jahani-Asl (born 1970s), physician, neurobiologist, and researcher
- Abdurrahman Sharafkandi (1921–1991), writer and poet

== See also ==
- Battle of Savujbulagh

== Sources ==
- Eagleton, W. & Neumann, R. (1986). "Mahābād". In Bosworth, C. E.; van Donzel, E.; Lewis, B. & Pellat, Ch. (eds.). The Encyclopaedia of Islam, Second Edition. Volume V: Khe–Mahi. Leiden: E. J. Brill. pp. 213–214. ISBN 978-90-04-07819-2.
- Hassanpour, Amir (1989). "Būkān". In Yarshater, Ehsan (ed.). Encyclopædia Iranica. Vol. IV/5: Brick–Burial II. London and New York: Routledge & Kegan Paul. p. 511. ISBN 978-0-71009-128-4.
- Minorsky, Vladmir & Bosworth, C.E. (1997). "Sāwd̲j̲-Bulāḳ". In Bosworth, C. E.; van Donzel, E.; Heinrichs, W. P. & Lecomte, G. (eds.). The Encyclopaedia of Islam, Second Edition. Volume IX: San–Sze. Leiden: E. J. Brill. p. 92. ISBN 978-90-04-10422-8.
