= Gweza Kwera =

Gweza Kwera گويزه كوره
- Village
- Location within Iran
- Coordinates: 35°30′19″N 46°15′24″E
- Country: Iran
- Province: Kurdistan
- County: Marivan
- Bakhsh: Central
- Rural District: Sarkal

Population (2006)
  - Total: 647
- Time zone: UTC+3:30 (IRST)
  - Summer (DST): UTC+4:30 (IRDT)

Gweza Kwera (Persian: گويزه كوره, also Romanized as Gowize Koure; is a village in Sarkal Rural District, in the Central District of Marivan County, Kurdistan Province, Iran. At the 2006 census, its population was 647, in 136 families. The village is populated by Kurds.
