= Mahwi =

Kurdish poet (1830–1906)

- مەحوی

Personal life
- Born: 1830 Sulaymaniyah
- Died: 1906 (aged 75–76) Sulaymaniyah
- Buried: In one of the rooms of Mahwi Khanqah Mosque.
- Spouse: Habiba Khatun
- Era: 19th century
- Main interest(s): Sufism, Kurdish literature, Irfan
- Notable work: Diwan of Mahwi

Religious life
- Religion: Islam
- Denomination: Sunni
- Jurisprudence: Shafi'i
- Creed: Ash'ari

Mahwi (Kurdish: مەحوی Mehwî; full name: مەلا موحەممەد کوڕی عوسمان باڵخی Mela Muhemmed 'Usman Ballxî) (1830-1906) was one of the most prominent classical Kurdish poets and sufis from Kurdistan of Iraq. He studied in Sablakh and Sanandaj in Iranian Kurdistan. He became a judge in the court of Slemani, in today's Iraq, in 1862, which was then part of the Ottoman Empire. He travelled to Istanbul and met Abdul-Hamid II in 1883. He established a khaneqah, an Islamic religious school and mosque, in Slemani and named it after an Ottoman emperor. In his poems, he mainly promotes sufism, but also deals with the human condition and existential problems, such as questions about the meaning of life.

== Works ==
A collection of his poems has been published several times.

1. Dîwanî Mehwî, Slemani, 1922.
2. Dîwanî Mehwî, Edited by Jamal Muhammad Muhammad Amin, Serkewtin Publishers, Sulaimaniya, 1984.
3. Dîwanî Mehwî, Edited and Analyised by Mala Abdolkarimi Modarres and Mohammed Mala Karim, Hissam Publishers, Baghdad, 1977 and 1984.

== See also ==
- List of Kurdish philosophers
