= Suwara Ilkhanizada =

Kurdish scholar

Suwara Ilkhanizada (Persian: سواره ایلخانی‌زاده, Sorani Kurdish: سواره ئیلخانیزاده; 1937 – January 14, 1976) was a Kurdish poet and writer.

He was born in the village of Turjan near Saqqez in the north-west of Iran. He went to local school and continued his studies in Tabriz. In 1962, he enrolled in the judicial law department of faculty of law at the University of Tehran. In 1964, he was imprisoned for six months in Qezelqaleh prison in Tehran for his alleged ties to the Kurdistan Democratic Party of Iran.

He graduated in 1968 and began working at the Kurdish service of Radio Tehran, where he presented a popular literary program called Tapo û Bomelêl. He died on January 14, 1976, after a car accident and a failed surgery operation at the Misaghiyye hospital in Tehran. He is buried at Hamamian cemetery a village near Bukan.

== Books ==
1. Xewe Berdîne (Collection of Poems), Ashti Publishers, 1992.
2. Tapo û Bomelêl, Ashti Publishers, 2000.

== Poems ==
1. Xewe Berdîne (Stone Dream), poem
2. Dûyi Rêbendan (February 13), Rûnakî Journal, No. 290, p. 19, Oct. 1969.
3. To Deryamî (You are my sea), poem
4. Korpey Lêwbebar (The sick child), poem
5. Şar (City)
6. Xêllî Diro (Tribe of Liars)
7. Kiçî Beyan (Daughter of Morning)
8. Sirwey Beyanî (Breeze of Morning)
9. Bo Kiçe Kurdê (For a Kurdish girl)
10. Halow (Eagle)
