= Khana Qubadi =

Kurdish Poet

Khana Qubadi (Kurdish: خانای قوبادی, lit. 'Xanay Qubadî', 1700–1759) was a Kurdish poet from the Jaff tribe who wrote in Gorani. He belonged to the Hawrami school of poetry in the Ardalan principality and lived in Derne which was the capital of Derteng, Hulwan and Bajelan dynasties which is located in modern-day Salas-e Babajani County. He first lived in Ardalan, but had to flee to neighboring Baban because of his translations of the Quran to Gorani.

== Works ==
His main published work is Şîrîn û Xesrew (Shirin and Khasraw), written in 1740. Despite being a master in Persian and Persian literature, he was in favor of using Kurdish as indicated in one of his poems:

Herçen mewaçan: Farsî şekeren
Kurdî ce şeker bell şîrînteren
Yeqînen ce dewr dunyay pirr endêş
Herkes dillşaden we ziwan wêş

—Xana Qubadî: from Şîrîn û Xesrew
Translation:

Although it's said that Persian is sweet as sugar,
But, for me Kurdish is sweeter than sugar
Clearly, in this perfidious world,
Everyone is happy with his own beautiful mother tongue.

== See also ==
- List of Kurdish philosophers
