= Nalî =

19th-century Kurdish poet and scholar

- Mulla Khidr (مەلا خدر)
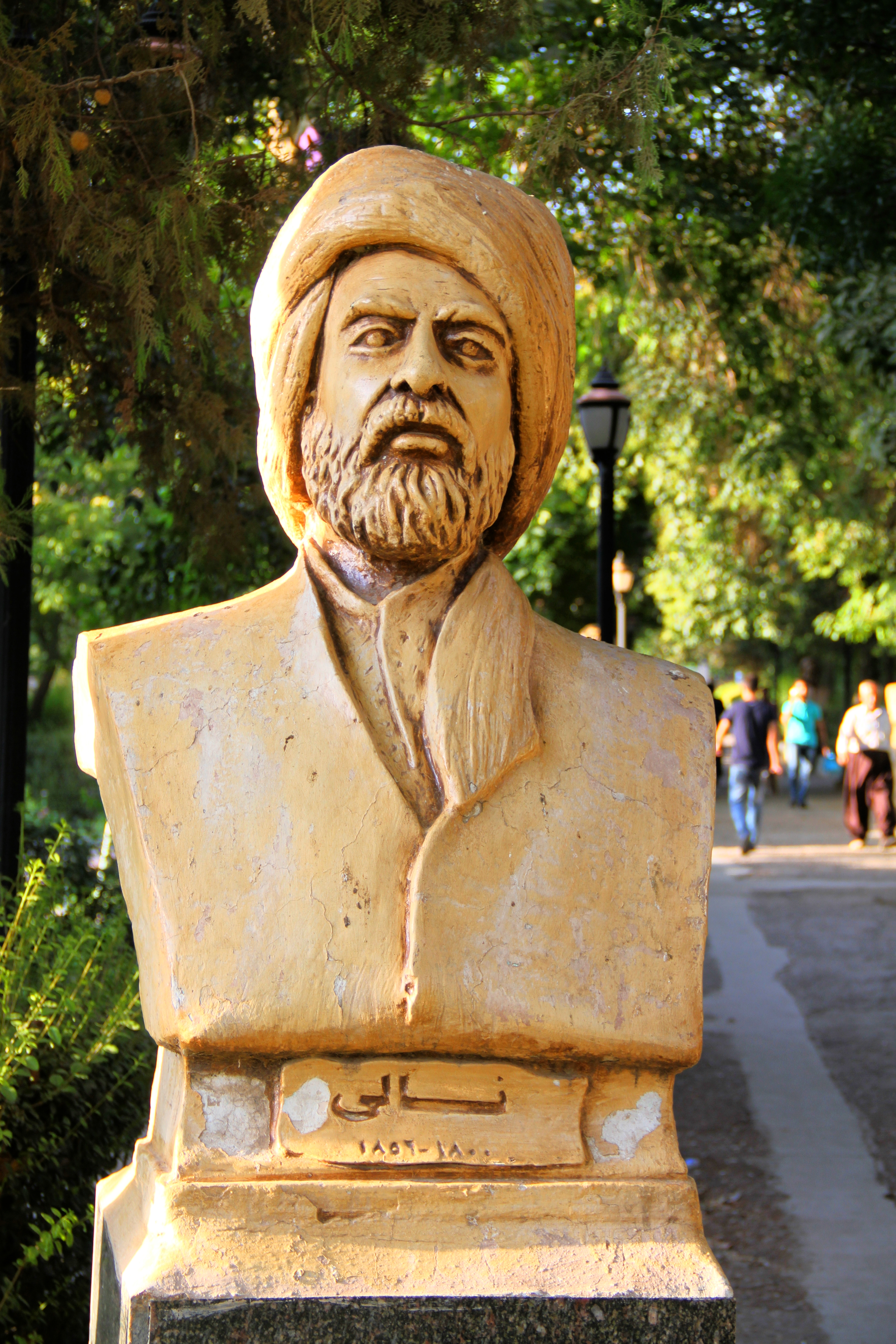
- Statue of Nalî in Sulaymaniyah, Kurdistan Region, Iraq

Personal life
- Born: 1797/1800 Khak u khol village, Sharazur, Baban Principality
- Died: 1855/1856 Eyüp Cemetery, Istanbul, Ottoman Empire
- Era: 19th century
- Region: Kurdistan
- Main interest(s): Kurdish literature, Islamic theology, Poetry
- Notable work: Diwani Nali

Religious life
- Religion: Islam
- Order: Naqshbandi
- Sect: Sunni
- Jurisprudence: Shafi'i
- Creed: Ash'ari

Nalî (Kurdish: نالی, romanized: Nalî, 1797/1800–1855/56), also known as Mela Khidrî Ehmedî Šaweysî Mikâʾîlî, was a prominent Kurdish poet, scholar, and linguist from the Sulaymaniyah region in present-day Kurdistan Region, Iraq. He is regarded as one of the most influential figures in classical Kurdish literature and a pioneer in the development of Central Kurdish as a literary language. He was known for his eloquent use of poetic forms and incorporation of themes such as love, mysticism, and Kurdish identity. Beside his literary contributions, he was also active in fields such as translation, jurisprudence, and mathematics, making him a key intellectual figure of 19th-century Kurdish society.

== See also ==
- Kurdish literature
- List of Kurdish philosophers
