= Mastoureh Ardalan =

Kurdish poet, historian, and writer

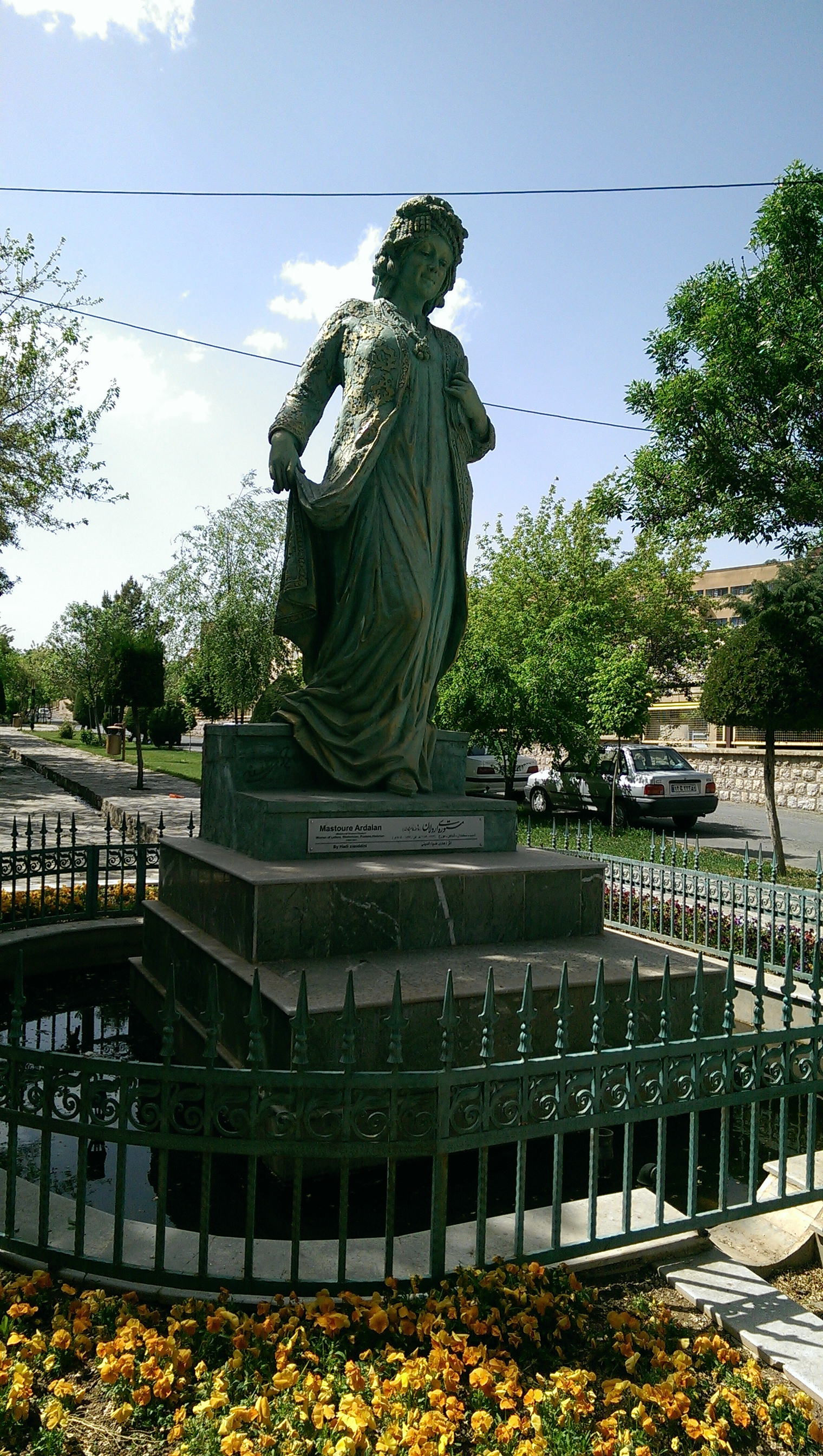
- A statue of Ardalan in Sanandaj, Iran
- Born: Mah Sharaf Khanom Mastoureh Ardalan; 1805; Sanandaj, Qajar Iran
- Died: 1848 (aged 42–43); Sulaymaniyah, Ottoman Iraq
- Occupations: Writer, poet, philosopher, historian
- Spouse: Khosro Ardalan
- Children: 1
- Parent: Abulhassan Beig (father)

Mah Sharaf Khanom Mastoureh Ardalan or Mastura Ardalan (1805−1848) was a kurdish poet, historian, and writer. She wrote mainly in Persian and Gorani.

== Biography ==
Ardalan was born in Sanandaj in Qajar Iran and died in Sulaymaniyah in the Ottoman Empire. She was a member of the feudal aristocracy in the court of the Principality of Ardalan. She studied Kurdish, Arabic and Persian under the supervision of her father, Abolhasan Beig Qadiri. Her husband, Khasraw Khani Ardalan was the ruler of the principality. Her husband's death left the principality vulnerable to outside interference. When the Qajar state conquered the Ardalan territory in the 19th century, she and her family left for the Baban principality centered in Sulaymaniyah. Her son, Reza Qulikhan, the successor to Khasraw Khan, was imprisoned by the Qajars.

== Works ==
She wrote several books of poetry, history and literature. She mainly wrote in Hawrami or Gorani, a Kurdish dialect, and in Persian, but she has a few poems in Central Kurdish as well. Most her Kurdish poetry was forgotten during the 20th century and was rediscovered and published by the end of 20th and the beginning of 21st century. She was a poet and renowned historiographer of the Middle East. She wrote a book about the history of the Kurdish Ardalan dynasty. She also wrote a collection of poems, which has been republished in recent years.

== Legacy ==
Her 200th birthday was celebrated recently in a festival in Erbil, in the Iraqi Kurdistan region, where her statue was unveiled in a ceremony. A conference was held on the works of Mastoureh in Erbil from 11 to 15 December 2005. Over one hundred scientific and cultural figures from across the world attended the congress in Iraqi Kurdistan, in which thirty articles in Kurdish, Persian, English, and Arabic were presented about the life and works of Mastoureh Ardalan. In addition, several of her works were published by the organizers in Persian and Kurdish during the congress.

A statue of Ardalan by Iranian sculptor Hadi Zia-dini now stands in Sanandaj, Iran.

== Books ==
- Khronika Doma Ardalan: Ta'rikh-I Ardalan by Mah Sharaf Khanum Kurdistani and E. I. Vasileva, ISBN 5-02-016559-X / 502016559X
- Divan-i Masturah Kurdistani, Collection of poems, 238 pp., 1998, ISBN 964-6528-02-3.

== See also ==
- List of Kurdish philosophers
- List of Kurdish scholars

== Sources ==
- Some of the Kurdish Poems of Mastura Ardalan
- Mastura Mâh-Sharaf Khâtun in Kurdish Literature
- Mastura Kurdistani, by Shahla Dabbaghi, in Kurdish
- About the Mastura Commemoration Congress in Irbil
- Woman poet statue set up in Irbil, Hewler Globe
