= Ali Hariri =

16th-century Kurdish poet

Ali Hariri or Sheikh Ahmed Bohtani (Kurdish: Elî Herîrî; died c. 16th century) was a Kurdish poet who wrote in Kurmanji and considered a pioneer in classical Kurdish Sufi literature and a founder of the Kurdish literary tradition.

== Biography ==
Little information survives about Ali Hariri, whom Bayazidi dated to the 15th century but who, according to Thomas Blois, should be placed later. Ergin Öpengin places his death at the turn of 16th century. He was first mentioned by Ehmedê Xanî in the 17th century, and limited information is known about him. His poetry focused on love, love for Kurdistan, its beautiful nature and the beauty of its people. The poems were popular and spread all over Kurdistan. According to historian Muhibbî, Hariri moved to Damascus to study and had a son named Şex Ehmed who possibly was a mullah and a faqih.

He died in Cizre and his grave is considered a sacred place and visited by numerous people every year.

== See also ==
- Melayê Cizîrî
