= Mele Perîşan =

Kurdish poet (1356–1431)

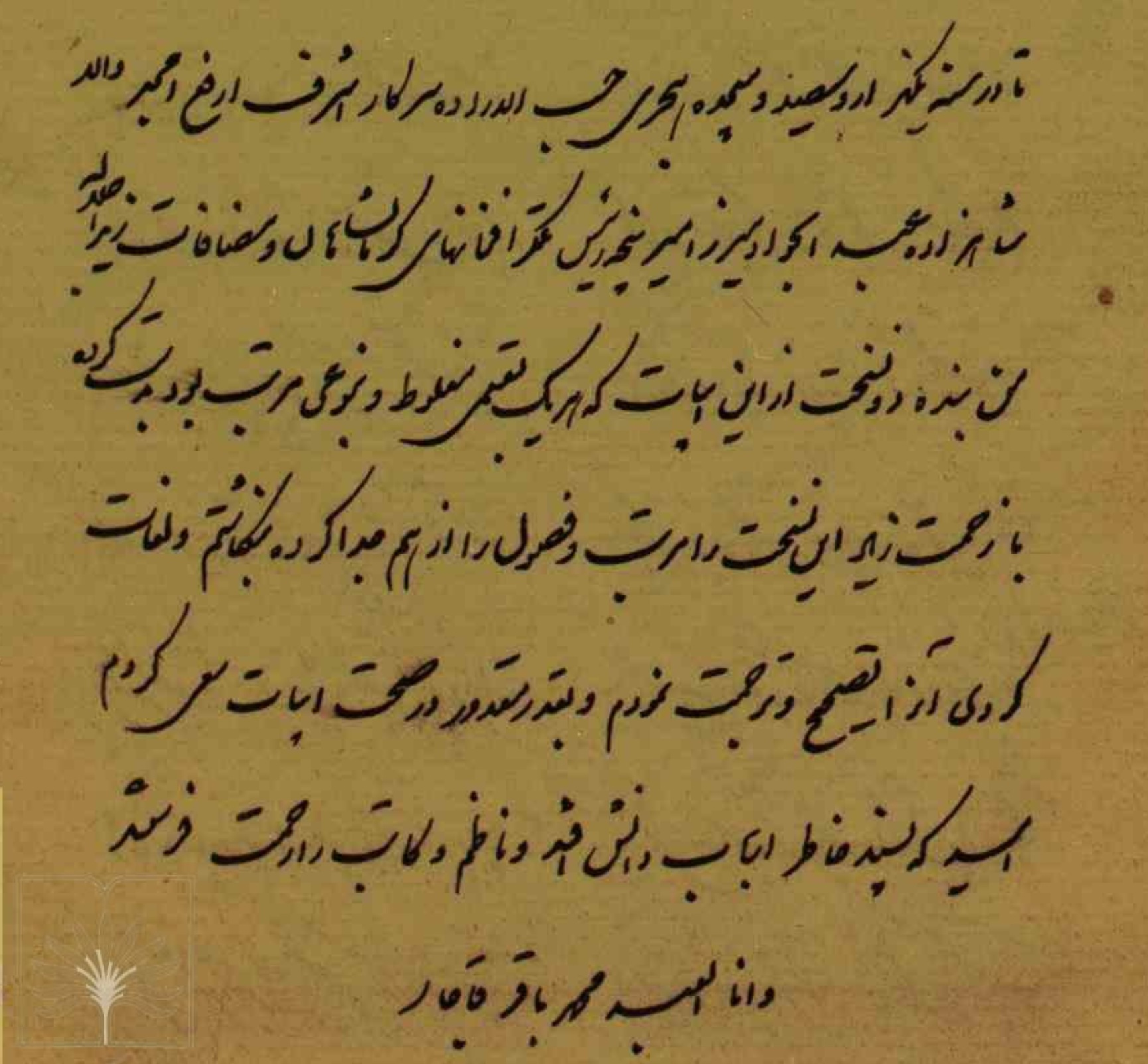
Scribe's introduction to Parishan Name of Mala Parishan that reads: "with lots of efforts I tidied up this manuscript and separated the chapters and translated and corrected the Kurdish words."

Mele Perîşan (Note: Various names exist in English literature including Molla Parishan, Mala Parishan, Mala Pareshan, Mulla Parishan and Malā Parēšān.) (born Mohammad Abulqasim, 1356–1431, Kurdish: مەلا پەرێشان, romanized: Mele Perîşan) was a Kurdish poet who wrote in Kurdish. His main work Parishan-nama is considered to be the oldest work in Gorani, and manuscripts of his poetry are kept in different libraries around the world including in libraries of Iran and Germany.

== Biography ==
Very little is known about the life of Mele Perîşan, but it is plausible that he was born in Dinavar and of the Ghiasvand tribe. He was Shia, Hurufist, spoke Arabic, Persian and Turkish beside Kurdish, and spent most of his life in the Dinavar area.

He was passionate about his religion in his poetry and was moreover an admirer of Rabia of Basra and her position on halal. While Parishan-nama is his main work, he also wrote popular drinking songs in Kurdish which have become popular among Kurds and Iranians.

== Parishan-nama ==
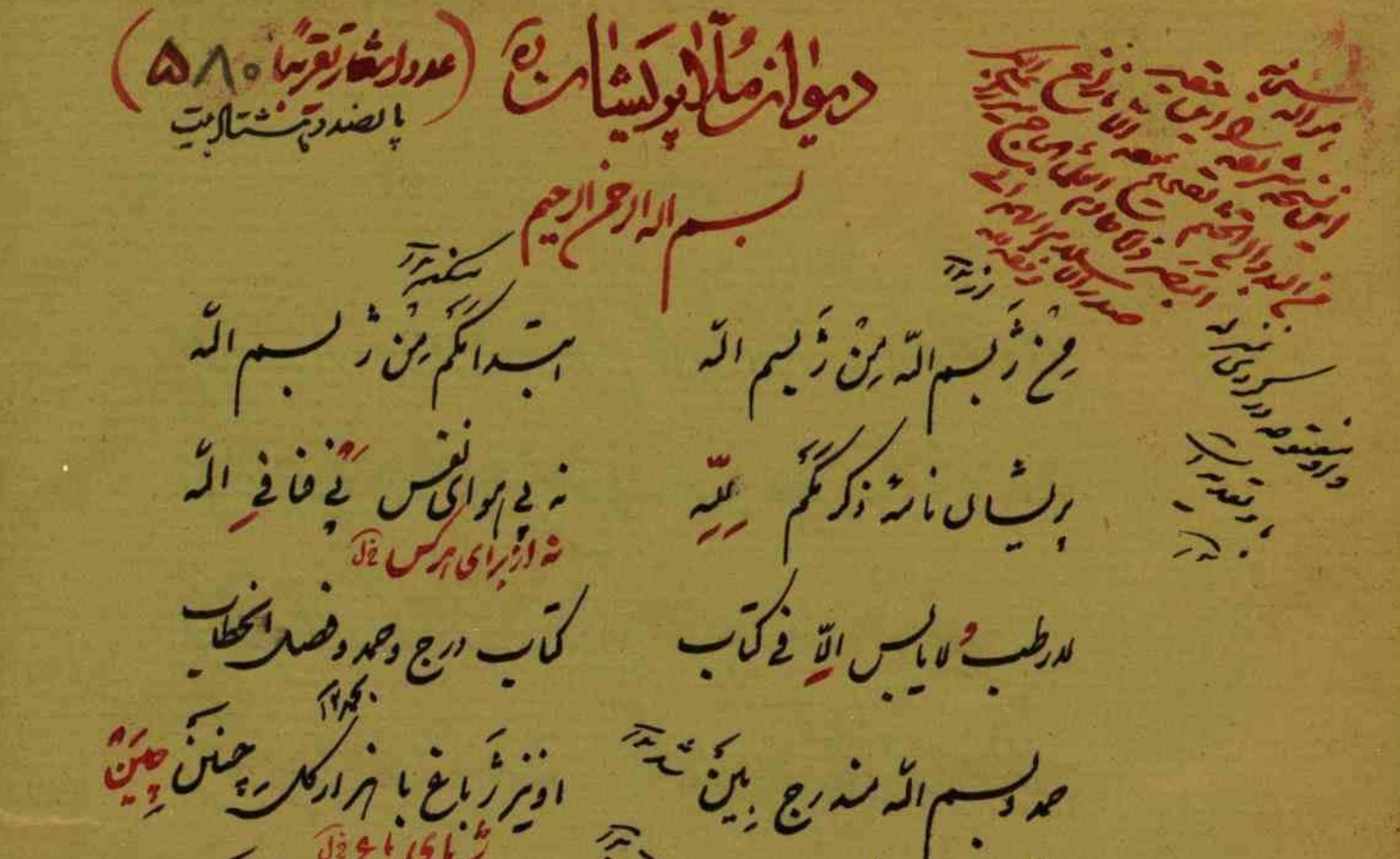
Scribe's annotation about the grammar of Kurdish language in the first page of Parishan Nama: "Letter Waw with Fatha in Kurdish is like preposition Ba for making (verbs) transitive"

The diwan Parishan-nama was written in Gorani with many Laki words, and contained Hurufist propaganda. It is the only known Hurifist text in Kurdish. It was first printed in Kermanshah in 1916 and subsequently printed several times in different places. It had a syllabic meter, which was a common characteristic of Gorani poetry.

== Literature ==
- Malā Parīšān: Parīšān-nāma, 1313 [1896] (in Kurdish), Staatsbibliothek zu Berlin - Preußischer Kulturbesitz, 1896, p. 125

== See also ==
- List of Kurdish philosophers
