= Mawlawi Tawagozi =

Kurdish poet (1806–1882)

- مەولەوی تاوەگۆزی
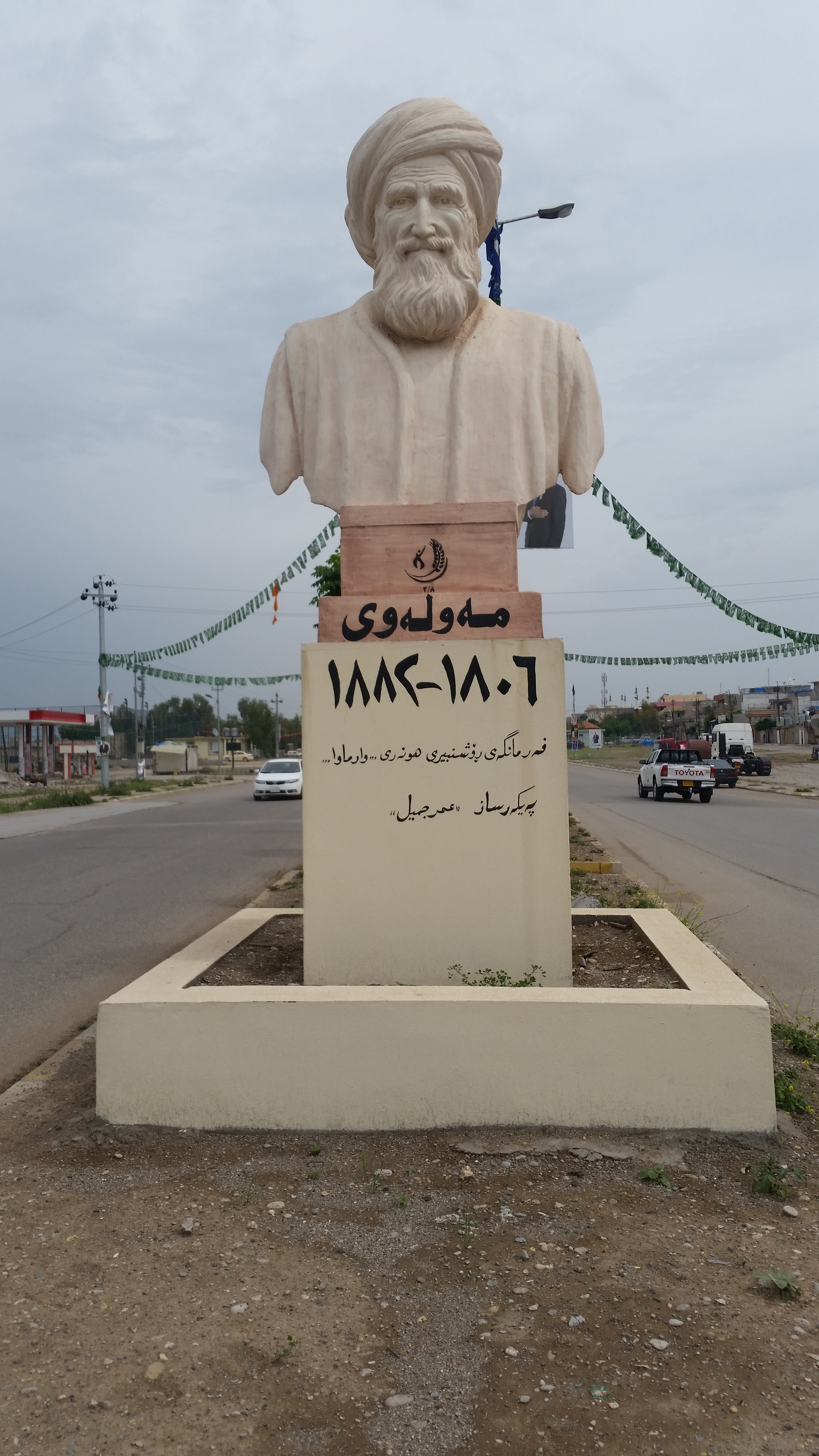
- Statue of Mawlawi

Personal life
- Born: 1806
- Died: 1882 (aged 75–76)
- Era: 19th century
- Region: Kurdistan
- Main interest(s): Sufism, Kurdish literature, Islamic theology
- Notable work: Diwan of Mawlawi - Aqeedah Al-Murdiyyah

Religious life
- Religion: Islam
- Denomination: Sunni
- Jurisprudence: Shafi'i
- Creed: Ash'ari

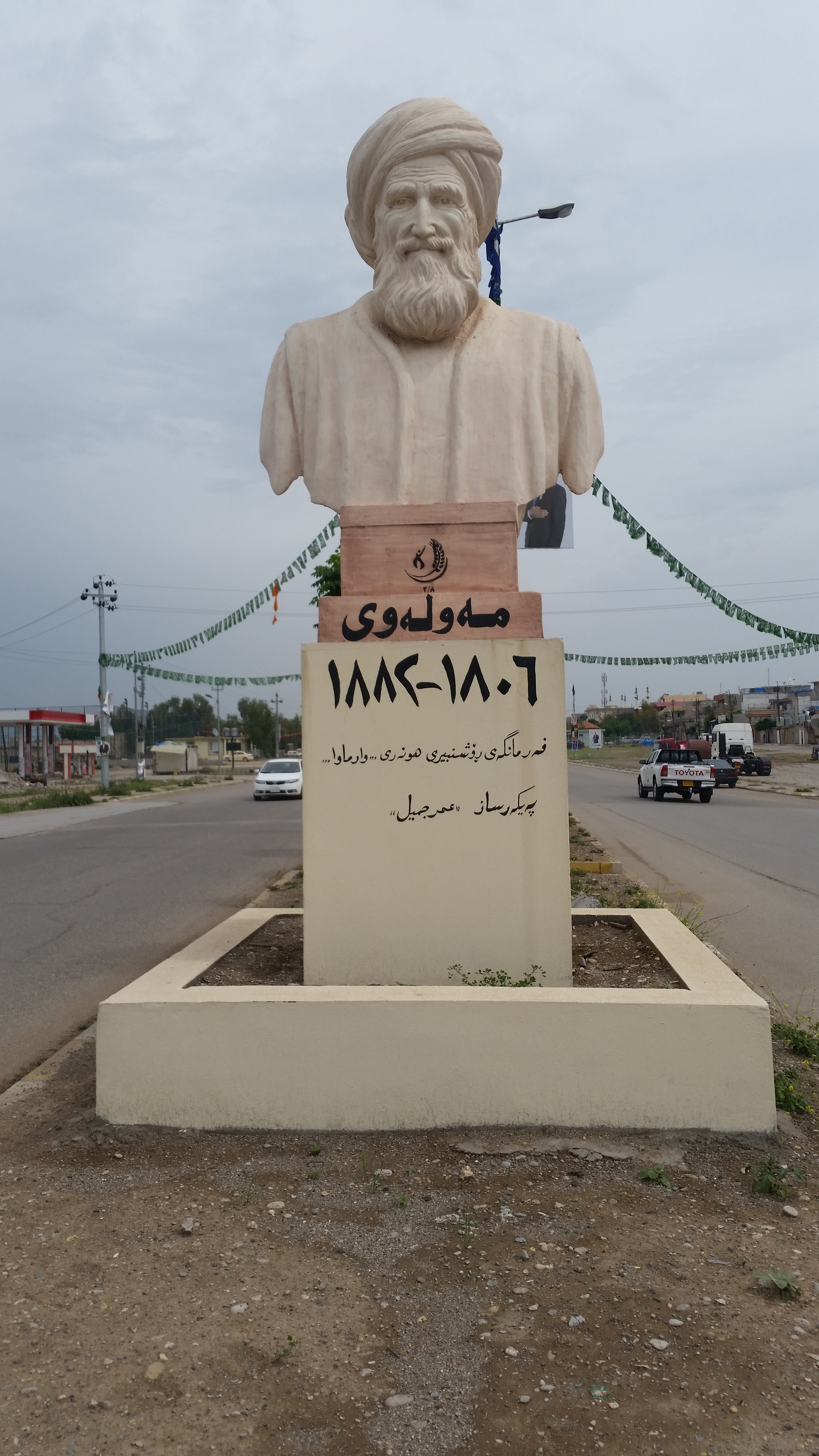
Statue of Mawlawi in Sulaymaniyah

Mawlawi Tawagozi, pen name Maʿdumi, better known as Mawlawi (1806-1882/3, Kurdish: مەولەوی تاوەگۆزی) was a Kurdish poet and leading Kurdish literary figure in the 19th century. He wrote in Gorani, Arabic and Persian.

== Biography ==
Mawlawi was born in a village in Paveh County in Iran into a family of notable theologians and the mystic and scholar Abu Bakr b. Hedāyat-Allāh Ḥosayni Kordi from the 16th century. His dad Mollā Saʿid was headmaster of a madrasa in Kurdistan and Mawlawi himself also attended various madrasas where he completed his studies. After his studies, he became a Mullah near Halabja where he quickly integrated himself into the social life of the region. He had been interested in Sufism for a while and joined the Naqshbandi order led by Oṯmān Serāj-al-Din who was a Naqshbandi leader of Kurds. He moreover received support from local Sufi Sheikhs who acted as patrons and also fostered close relations with the Jaff tribe and the Ardalan state. His wife Ḵātun ʿAnbar, died before him and he wrote many poems about the pain of losing her. In the final years of his life, his library burnt down and he was blind for the last seven years of his life. He died falling of a horse near Halabja.

== Poetry ==
Mawlawi was a prolific writer and his favorite genre was the ghazal. He was influenced by especially Hafez but also Rumi whom he knew since childhood, but remained loyal to the Gorani literary traditions.

== See also ==
- List of Kurdish philosophers
