= Haji Qadiri Koyi =

Kurdish poet

- Native name: حاجی قادری کۆیی, Hacî Qadirî Koyî
- Born: 1817 Koi Sanjaq, Kurdistan, Ottoman Empire
- Died: 1897 (aged 79–80) Istanbul, Ottoman Empire
- Language: Kurdish

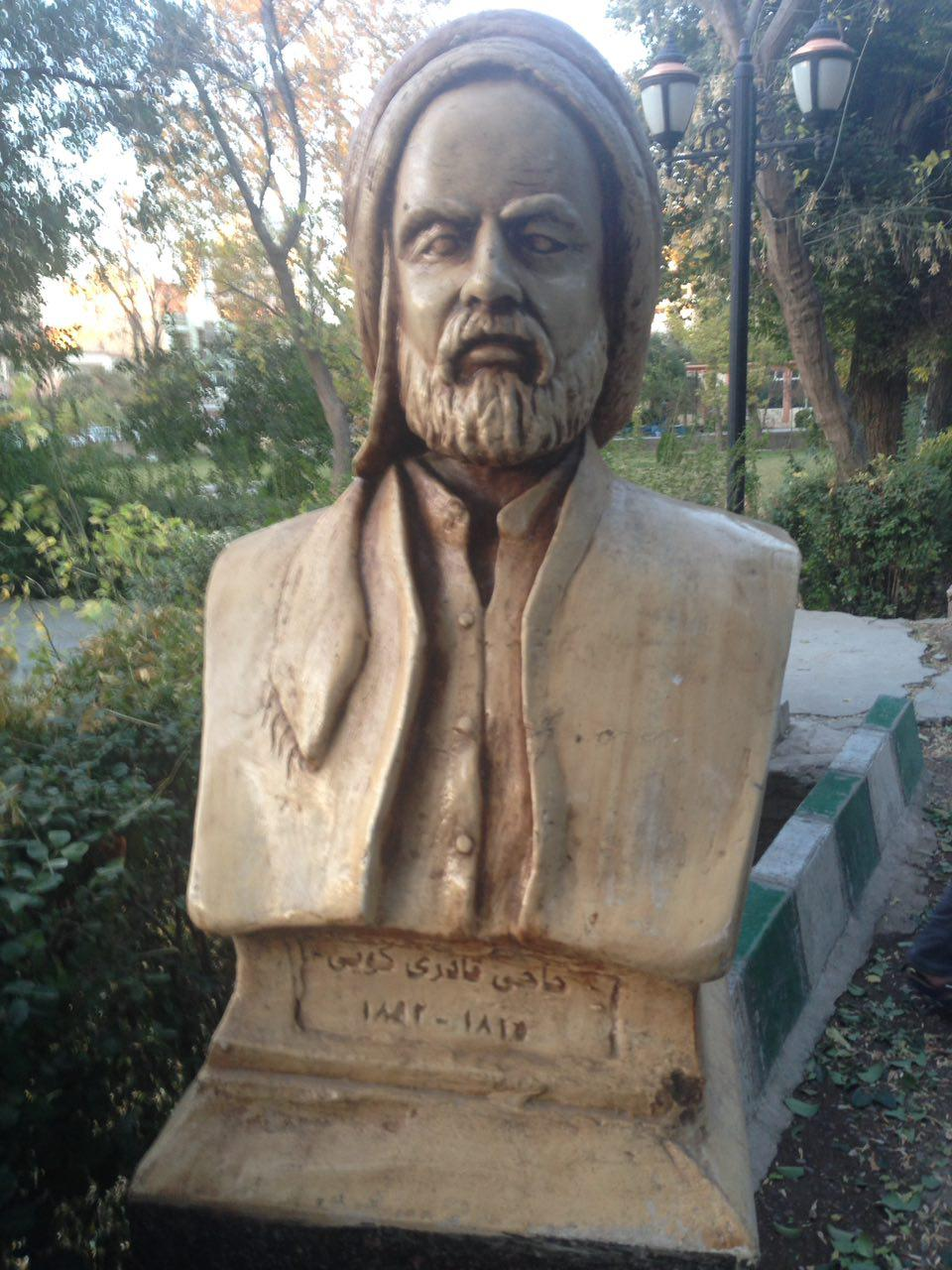
Haji Qadir Koyî

Haji Qadiri Koyi (Kurdish: حاجی قادری کۆیی, romanized: Hacî Qadirî Koyî; c. 1817 – 1897) was a Kurdish poet. He carried on the nationalistic message of Ahmad Khani in his writings. He wanted to enlighten the people and help them to remedy the problems of illiteracy and backwardness and ideas which result from lack of knowledge and religious fanaticism. He encouraged people instead to turn to science and to the realities of modern society in the struggle to liberate and build an independent Kurdistan. According to him, a Kurd is one who speaks Kurdish. In his time, in the late 19th century, the remaining Kurdish principalities had been overthrown by the Ottoman and Persian states. Koyi attacked the shaikhs and mullahs who did not care for the Kurdish language and the notables who ignored the destinies of their people. Living his last years in cosmopolitan Istanbul, he was familiar with the nationalist struggles and the material advancement of modern nations. He constantly advocated use of the Kurdish language. Although his own medium was poetry, he urged the Kurds to publish magazines and newspapers. Calling on the Kurds, in the 1880s, to unite and form their own independent state, he also urged them to use the modern tools such as newspapers and magazines for mass communication. The first Kurdish newspaper, Kurdistan, was published in Cairo in 1898, a year after Haji Qadir's death. Farangis Ghaderi who has studied his poetry in her PhD dissertation argues that modern Kurdish poetry emerged in the late nineteenth century and with Koyî's poetry. She also argues that Hacî Qadirî Koyî should be considered the originator of Kurdish nationalism.

Jalal Dabagh wrote a book discussing Haji Qadir Koyi with the same name.

== Books ==
1. Dîwanî Hacî Qadirî Koyî (Collected Poetry of Haji Qadir Koyi). Collected and edited by Sardar Hamid Miran and Karim Mistafa Sharaza. Emîndarêtî Giştî Roşinbîrî w Lawanî Nawçey Kurdistan, 1986, Baghdad.

== See also ==
- List of Kurdish scholars
