= Melayê Cizîrî =

Kurdish poet and mystic (c. 1570–1640)

- Native name: [مەلای جزیری]
- Born: Ahmad Nîşanî c. 1570 Cizre, Bohtan (present-day Turkey)
- Died: c. 1640 Diyarbakır, Ottoman Empire
- Occupation: Poet; Theologian; Sufi mystic
- Language: Kurmanji
- Literary movement: Sufism; Kurdish literature
- Notable works: Diwan

Ahmad Nîşanî, better known as Melayê Cizîrî, was a Kurdish poet, theologian, and Sufi mystic. He was born c. 1570 in Cizre (Bohtan, in present-day Turkey) and died c. 1640 in Diyarbakır (Ottoman Empire).

== Biography ==
Born in Cizre of Bohtan around year 1570, Cizîrî was a Sufi who spoke Kurdish, Arabic and Persian. He only expressed himself literarily in Kurdish. He began his studies in his hometown before traveling to Baghdad, Syria, Egypt and Persia to study philosophy, astrology and divination. During this period, he became familiar with Hafez who would become an influence in his poetry. Other influences included Rumi, Saadi Shirazi and Jami.

When he returned to Kurdistan, he established himself in Diyarbakır and began teaching until his death. He was buried in the city near Sur but his burial place has since then been destroyed by the Turkish military. Cizîrî was a friend of Sharafkhan Bidlisi of Principality of Bitlis and celebrated him in two poems.

His love for Kurdistan was also explicitly expressed in his literature.

== Style ==
The poetry of Cizîrî had a well-established technique based on the forms of Arab-Persian poetry, using the bayt and the meter frequently used by Hafez in his ghazals. Inspired by the dominating Naqshbandi order during the period, Cizîrî wrote about "pure love, the wine of ecstasy, metaphysical rapture, and the joys and sufferings of mystical love." He was the first Kurd to use the qasida genre and the first to write a complete diwan of roughly 120 poems.

== Legacy ==
During his lifetime, Cizîrî's poetry was popular. Cizîrî would also become the father of a Kurdish literary school and was admired by later poets like Ahmad Khani and Cigerxwîn. As he was one of the earliest users of Kurmanji in literary work, he also served as model for other poets including Ahmad Khani who wrote Mem and Zin in the same dialect. He would also lay the foundations for the Kurdish qasida which emerged in the subsequent centuries.

Among Kurdish nationalists, Cizîrî is a symbol of national pride.

== See also ==
- List of Kurdish philosophers
