= List of Kurdish poets and authors =

The following is a list of Kurdish poets and authors:

== 9th century ==
- Balool

== 10th-15th century ==
- Evdilsemedê Babek (972–1019)
- Ali Hariri (1009–1079/80)
- Mele Perîşan (1356–1431)
- Mela Huseynê Bateyî (1417–1495)

== 16th century ==
- Sherefxan Bidlisi (1543–1599)
- Şêx Şemsedînê Exlatî (1558–1674)
- Melayê Cizîrî (1570–1640)
- Asenath Barzani (1590–1670)
- Feqiyê Teyran (1590–1660)
- Yusuf Yaska (1592–1636)
- Elî Teremaxî

== 17th century ==
- Mistefa Bêsaranî (1642–1701)
- Ahmad Khani (1651–1707)
- Shaykh Mustafa Takhtayi

== 18th century ==
- Khana Qubadi (1700–1759), classic poet from southeastern Kurdistan, Iran.
- Almas Khan-e Kanoule'ei (1706-1777), classic poet and author of Kurdish Shahnameh.
- Marif Nodeyi (1753–1838/9)
- Xelîlê Sêrtî (1754–1843)
- Khulam Rada Khan Arkawazi (1765-1834), classic poet and ascetic from southeastern Kurdistan, Iran.
- Khâlid-i Shahrazuri (1779–1827)
- Şeyda Hewramî (1784–1852)
- Mahmud Bayazidi (1797–1859)
- Nalî (1797/1800–1855/6)
- Yaqub Maydashti (1799–1871), classic poet from southeastern Kurdistan, Iran.

== 19th century ==
- Mastoura Ardalan (1805–1848), poet and historiographer.
- Mawlawi Tawagozi (1806–1882), poet and Sufi.
- Haji Qadir Koyi (1817–1897), poet.
- Tirkamir Azadbakht (1747-1820), poet.
- Mahwi (1830–1906), poet and Sufi.
- Sheikh Rezza Talabani (1835–1910), Iraq.
- Wafaei (1844–1902) poet, Iran.
- Edeb (1860–1918), poet, Iran

== 20th century ==
- Piramerd (1867–1950), poet, writer, novelist and journalist, Iraqi Kurdistan.
- Muhamed Amin Zaki (1880–1948), writer, historian and politician, Iraqi Kurdistan.
- Taufiq Wahby (1891–1984), writer and linguist, Iraq.
- Celadet Bedir Khan (Celadet Alî Bedirxan), (1893–1951), linguist, journalist and politician, founder of the Latin-based Kurdish alphabet.
- Nuri Barzinji (1896–1958), poet, Iraqi Kurdistan.
- Arab Shamilov (Erebê Şemo) (1897–1978), writer and novelist, Armenia.
- Rafiq Hilmi (1898–1960), writer, literary analyst and politician, Iraq.
- Muhammad Wali Kermashani (1901-?), poet, Iran
- Cigerxwîn (Cegerxwîn), (1903–1984), poet and writer, Turkey/Syria.
- Abdulla Goran (1904–1962), poet and father of modern Kurdish poetry, Iraqi Kurdistan.
- Osman Sabri (1905–1993), poet, writer and journalist, Turkey/Syria.
- Emînê Evdal (1906–1964), writer and linguist, Armenia.
- Alaaddin Sajadi (1907–1984), writer, poet and academic, Iraqi Kurdistan.
- Hecîyê Cindî (1908–1990), writer, linguist and researcher, Armenia.
- Qanate Kurdo (1909–1985), writer, linguist and academic, Russia.
- Qedrîcan (1911–1972), poet and writer, Turkey/Syria.
- Ibrahim Ahmad (1914–2000), writer, novelist and translator, Iraqi Kurdistan/England.
- Dildar, (Yonis Reuf), (1917–1948), poet, Iraq
- Nûredin Zaza (1919-1988), writer, publisher, Turkey and Syria, Switzerland.
- Hejar (Abdurrahman Sharafkandi), (1920–1990), poet, writer, translator and linguist, Iran.
- Hemin Mukriyani (Hêmin Mukriyanî), (1921–1986), journalist and poet, Iran.
- Ahmad Hardi (1922–2006), poet, Iraqi Kurdistan/UK.
- Karim Hisami (1926–2001), writer, Iran/Iraq/Sweden.
- Muhamad Salih Dilan (1927–1990), One of the founders of modern Kurdish poetry.
- Shamil Asgarov (1928–2005), poet, researcher on the history and culture of the Kurds in Azerbaijan, translator.
- Emerîkê Serdar (1935-2018), journalist, writer and translator, Armenia.
- Mahmud Baksi (1944–2001), writer and journalist, Sweden.
- Abdulla Pashew (1946- ), contemporary poet, Iraqi Kurdistan/Sweden
- Shami Kermashani (1927-1984), poet from southeastern Kurdistan, Iran.
- Faryad Shiri (1971- ), poet from southeastern Kurdistan, Iran.
- Malak Jân Nemati (1906-1993), mystical writer and poet from southeastern Kurdistan, Iran.
- Khider Kosari (1969–1993) Islamist poet from Ranya, Kurdistan.
- Jila Hosseini (1964–1996) poet, writer and radio announcer from Eastern Kurdistan.

== 21st century ==
- Bachtyar Ali, (1960), Kurdish writer and poet
- Hiwa Qadir, (1964), Kurdish writer and poet
- Sara Omar, (1986-), Contemporary author, novelist, poet human rights fighter, first internationally recognized Kurdish female novelist from Kurdistan
- Abdullah Öcalan
- Selahattin Demirtaş
- Arjen Arî, (1956-2012), Kurdish writer and poet
- Müslüm Aslan, (1974), Kurdish writer and poet
- Necat Baysal, (1988), Kurdish writer and poet

== See also ==
- List of Kurdish scholars
