= Adab =

Adab or ADAB may refer to:

Places

- Adab (city), a city of ancient Sumer
- Adab, Yemen, a village
- Al Dhafra Air Base, a military installation of the United Arab Emirates Air Force near Abu Dhabi, UAE

Literary and cultural use

- Adab (Islam), the category of Islamic law dealing with etiquette
- Adab (literature), the classical Islamic literature
- Adab (gesture), a greeting gesture traditionally used by Muslims of South Asia

Media

- Al Adab, Arabic online literary magazine in Beirut, Lebanon

Organizations

- Australian Development Assistance Bureau, predecessor of Australian Aid, Australia's foreign aid program

Surname

- Misbaholdiwan Adab, a Kurdish poet
