= Yekta Uzunoğlu =

Turkish doctor and writer (born 1953)

Yekta Uzunoglu
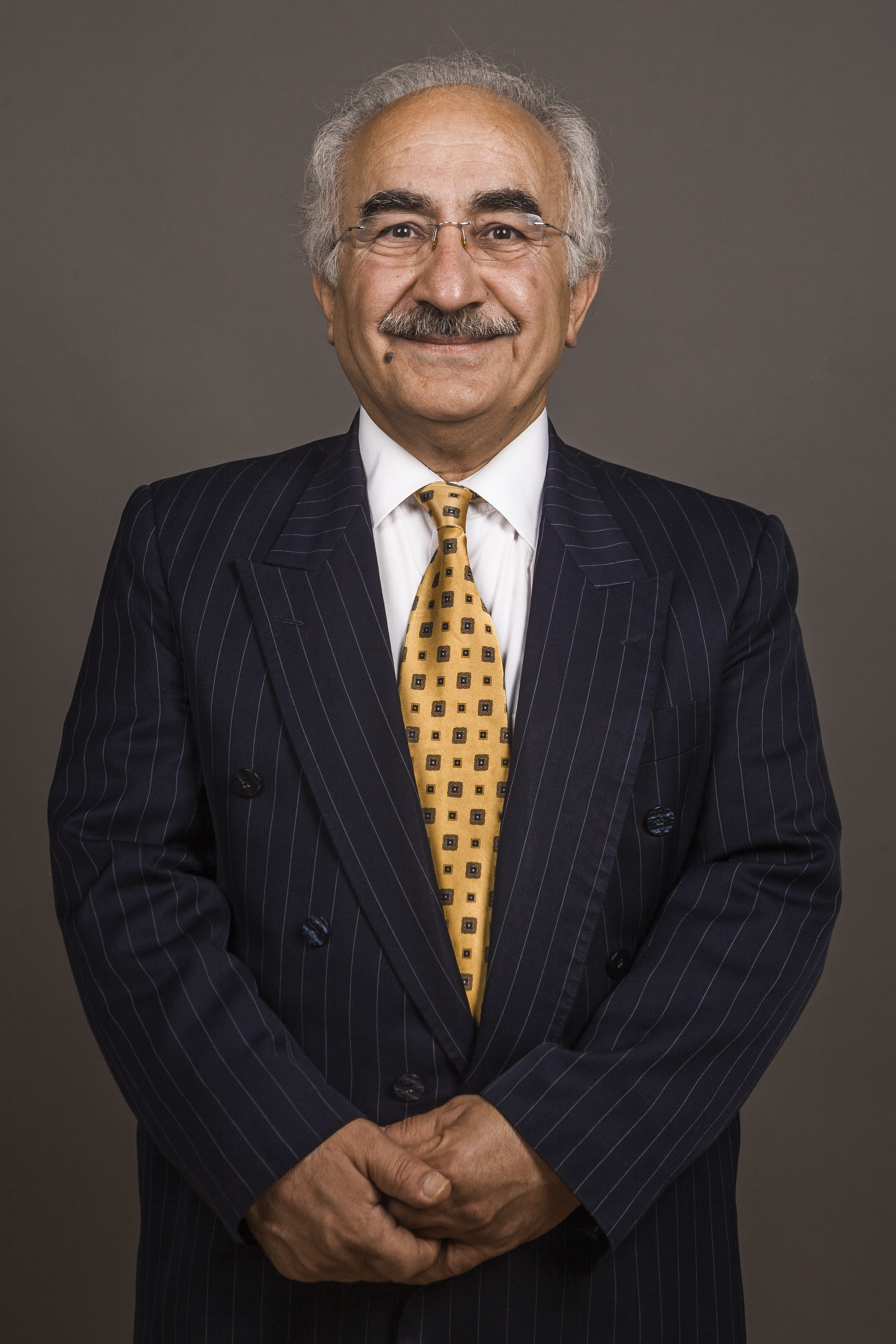
- Born: 10 May 1953 (age 73); Silvan, Diyarbakır, Turkey
- Occupations: Writer, translator, physician, entrepreneur

Yekta Uzunoğlu (born 10 May 1953 in Silvan, Diyarbakır) is a Kurdish physician, writer, translator and publisher. Born in Silvan, Turkey, he studied medicine at Charles University in Prague and became involved in Kurdish-language publishing and translation. His work has included Kurdish cultural publications, translations from Czech and other languages, and cooperation with Kurdish and literary organizations in Europe. In 2006, he received the František Kriegel Award from the Charter 77 Foundation.

== Biography ==
He was born in 1953 in Silvan, Diyarbakır. In 1971 he went to France for higher education. After his family's financial assistance was refused by the junta of 1971 in Turkey (see: 1971 Turkish military memorandum), he went to Prague to study medicine. Between 1972 and 1979, he obtained a scholarship from Kurdish Prince Kamuran Ali Bedirhan to complete his medical education at Charles University in Prague. In 1979 he graduated from Charles University and became a medical doctor.

In 1976, he co-founded an illegal publishing house during the communist Czechoslovakia era with Prof. Dr. Pavel Martasek and Vladimir Korensky. Until 1979 they published many books on Kurds, a map of Kurdistan and Joyce Blau's works, who was a professor at the Sorbonne University in Paris.

== Works ==
He has participated in editing of a Kurdish grammar book, translated parts of Bible and works of Karel Čapek into Kurdish and Kurdish poetry into Czech. He has also cooperated with the Kurdish Institute of Paris, the Kurdish Institut of Bonn and the Czech Center of the International PEN Club.

== Award ==
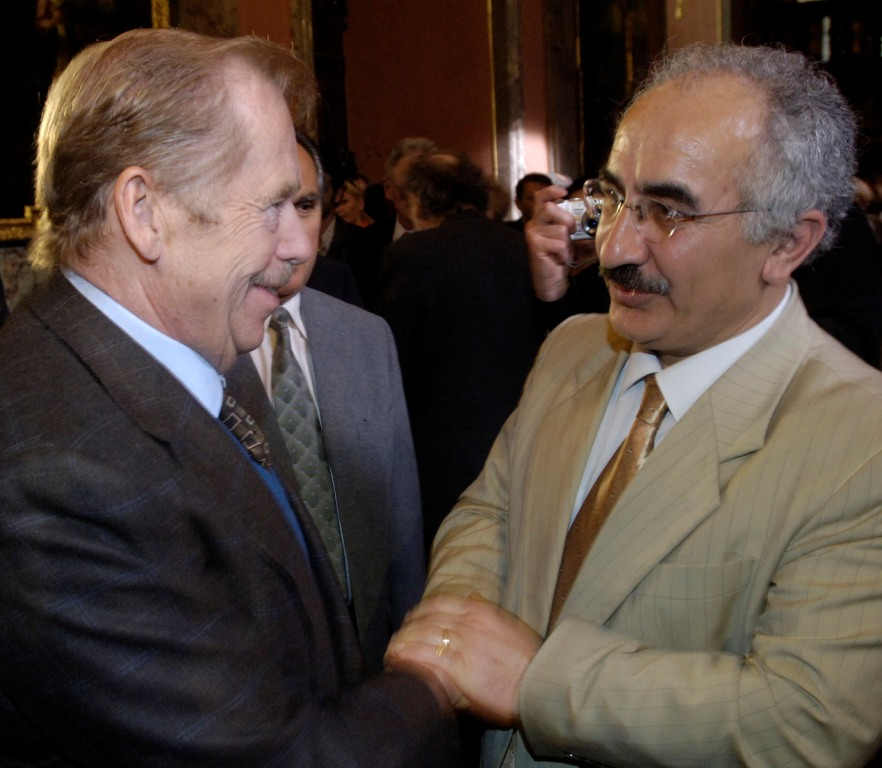
Yekta Uzunoglu with Václav Have l- 2006

He was presented František Kriegel award which is granted once a year by the Charter 77 Foundation in the Czech Republic - because of his civic courage. President of the Czech Republic, Václav Havel, presented the award to Yekta Uzunoglu at a ceremony attended by hundreds of Europe's most illustrious figures. In the Czech Republic, he was the first foreigner to receive this honour.

== Quest for Justice ==
On 13 September 1994, Czech police detained Yekta Uzunoglu (subsequently the officer in charge, Josef Opava, received a fourteen-year sentence as a member of the infamous "Berdych's gang"); his unlawful detention (Czech law allowed maximum 24 hours of detention) lasted nearly 72 hours without charges being laid. Afterwards, according to press statement from police officer Jiří Gregor, accusations were made of "illegal arms and drugs trading" and Uzunoglu was remanded into custody.

One month later, the previous charges were dropped, but more charges were brought of "preparing of murders, unlawful possession of guns, multiple frauds and torture"; these accusations had been laid by "Göksel Otan", supposed Turkish citizen living in the Czech Republic.

The case was litigated until 10 April 1995, when all accusations were proven to be false, except a count of torture. Purportedly Uzunoglu, with the help of other detainees, had tortured Göksel Otan on 9 September and then two other people (one of them his cousin), on the date he was detained. At this time, according to court files, one of the accused persons (Uzunoglu's nephew) had been already in custody for several hours. However, even this version of the lawsuit was not accepted by the responsible court.

Meanwhile, Uzunoglu's remand was prolonged and Uzunoglu endured unlawful mistreatment, as then minister of justice Jan Ruml later confessed.

Later in 1996, Uzunoglu received the German citizenship, although still in custody. During the ensuing trial, it was shown that "Göksel Otan" was a false identity and that a false passport in that name had been used for at least 25 years. "Göksel" admitted in court that his true name is "Gurkan Gönen". According to Ministry of interior inquiry, Gönen has been a long-term informer of communist STB and after Velvet revolution worked as an informer for cpt. Horák, policeman leading the prosecution of Uzunoglu.

A final version of the lawsuit, literally same as the one rejected in 1995, was filed on 18 January 2000. In January 2003, the charge moved to Turkey's jurisdiction, which subsequently returned it to the Czech court 9 months later. On 25 September 2003, the Czech court stopped prosecution of Uzunoglu for humanitarian reasons, but both the prosecutor and Uzunoglu would not accept this decision; the latter demanded to be cleared of all accusations.

On 3 March 2006, important figures of the Czech public life published an open letter called "Žalujeme" ("We accuse", similar to Émile Zola's "J'accuse ...!", which helped end the infamous Dreyfus affair in France 100 years before), namely Pavel Dostál, Táňa Fischerová, František Janouch, Karel Jech, Květa Jechová, Svatopluk Karásek, Jaroslav Kořán, Dana Němcová, Karel Schwarzenberg, Jiřina Šiklová, Věněk Šilhán, Libuše Šilhánová, Jaromír Štětina, Petruška Šustrová.

In April 2006, Yekta Uzunoglu was presented the František Kriegel prize for civic courage.

In March 2007, Uzunoglu started an 11 days long hunger strike against his prolonged process, and many important public figures, including former president Václav Havel, joined him symbolically for one day. On 29 March 2007, Uzunoglu was sentenced to two years in prison, which he immediately appealed against, describing it as "fashizoid" justice. Amnesty International declared their support of Uzunoglu. On 31 July 2007, Prague's Court of appeals heard the appeal and finally dropped all charges.

On 28 April 2017, Yekta Uzunoglu was arrested in Prague, but the next day he was released. According to Uzunoglu himself, the Turkish Embassy in Prague is behind the initiative of the police. The Constitutional Court of the Czech Republic with its finding of 13 February 2018 issue: III. ÚS 1920/17 Judge-Rapporteur prof. JUDr. Jan Filip CSc. stated that Yekta Uzunoglu's arrest on 28 April 2017 was unconstitutional. For more informations see press agency of Kurdistan Bakur

== Allegations of the involvement of the Turkish government ==
Yekta alleges that the police charges against him were part of a conspiracy orchestrated by the Turkish government under Tansu Çiller and former communists including former Czechoslovak foreign minister Jaromir Johanes who now lives in Turkey.

== Turkey's arrest warrant in 2019 ==
In 2015 upon the request of MEP Jaromir Štětina, Vice-chair of European Parliament Security and Defence Committee, Yekta Uzunoğlu traveled with MEP Stetina to North Syria in order to investigate the situation of the war against the ISIS. After their return from the travel Uzunoglu shared some photographs from their visit on his Twitter page which were the same photographs that MEP Stetina posted on his personal Twitter account and these photos can also be found on official EU Parliament's web page. In January 2019 Turkey has issued an arrest warrant for Uzunoglu due to these photographs on his Twitter page. In order to prevent delivery of Uzunoglu, who is also a German citizen, to Turkey; Amnesty International, Members of European Parliament, Kurdish PEN club and many Czech famous personalities warned the German and the Czech governments.

== Publications ==
- Siverek Kültür Gazetesi (Siverek Culture Newspaper) -Dr. Yekta Uzunoğlu, together with Necati Siyahkan,- one of the leading Kurdish lawyers-, published the Siverek Culture Newspaper, 1970
- Ronahi (Light) - Kurdish magazine with which Yekta Uzunoğlu collaborated, 1971-1973
- Láska u Kurdů (Love at the Kurds) - Czech language, Published in 1976-1979 samizdat, available in Libri Prohibiti Library
- Země Kurdů (The Kurds' Country) - Czech language, Published in 1976-1979 samizdat, available in Libri Prohibiti Library
- Legenda o Kurdech (The Legend of the Kurds) - Czech language, Published in 1976-1979 samizdat, available in Libri Prohibiti Library
- Le probleme Kurde (The Kurdish Problem) - By Prof. Joyce Blau, Sorbonne University - Prague, 1977
- Kurdische Alphabet (Kurdish Alphabet) - Bonn, 1982
- MEHDI ZANA MUSS GERETTET WERDEN - Bonn, 1982
- Der kulturelle Völkermord an den Kurden in der Türkei (Cultural genocide of the Kurds in Turkey) - Bonn, 1982
- Brochure Passion der Kurden" (Passion of the Kurds) - with Prof. Pfeipfer as co-editor. Published by University of Dortmund and Bonn Kurdish Institute – Bonn, 1984
- Musîka Kurdî-Kurdische Musik - with Kendal Nezan - Bonn, 1985, ISBN 3-925519-02-5
- Hey lê - bi kurdî binivîsîne. (Hey Lady, Please Write in Kurdish) - Bonn, 1985
- Kürdün Türküsü (A Song of Kurd) - written by Ihsan Aksoy. Bonn, 1985
- Kovara Mizgîn - 1983 / 1984 / 1985 - The journal edited by Yekta Uzunoğlu, Bonn Kurdish Institute
- Plandayîna Malbatê (The Family Planning) - Dr. Yekta Uzunoglu : author and editor. Co-editors: PRO FAMILIA, Germany and IOOD London, UK., Bonn 1985
- Kurdish-German and German-Nurdence Dictionary - Completion of Kurdish-German and German-Kurdish dictionaries. 1987
- První Pomoc Na Místě Nehody (First Aid in an Accident) - Published by the Bonn Kurdish Institute
- Poradce pro Kurdské ženy v SRN (Kurdish Women in Germany) - Bilingual booklet for immigrant women, written and advised by Yekta Uzunoğlu. 1984
- Wenn Man ins Krankenhaus Musst (When You Have To Go To The Hospital) - Publisher: German Red Cross and Bonn Kurdish Institute. 1984
- Antologie Kurdské Hudby (Kurdish Music Anthology) - Consists of 8 cassettes containing authentic Kurdish music. It was the largest anthology of its time ever. 1984
- The Destiny of M.Karataş – A Story of a Man in Exile - Published in book and cassette form for illiterate Kurds. Bonn, 1985
- Kurdische Volksdichtung (Kurdish Folk Poetry),- Thomas Bois: Bonn Kurdish Institute, Bonn, 1986
- Kurdische Grammatik (Kurdish Grammar) - D. N. MacKenzie: Bonn Kurdish Institute, Bonn, 1986
- Îsa Diçe Qudisê (Jesus in Jerusalem) - Bonn, 1986
- Îsa Can Dide Mirîya (Jesus Resurrect the Deads) - Bonn, 1986
- Yûnis (Jonah) - Bonn, 1986
- Kurdská Přísloví (Kurdish Sayings) - With the prologue by Dr. Tomaš Vrba - Prague, 1993
- Ekonomické Perspektivy ČR (Economical Perspectives of the Czech Republic) - V. Klaus, Ivan Kočárník, Karel Dyba, J. Zieleniec, J. Lux and others: Meridian Publishing House, Prague, 1993
- Ein Kurde im Mahlwerk des Übergangs. Ein Bericht aus Tschechien - Prologue by Bernhard von Grünberg - with presentation by František Janouch, 2007
- Výpověď(Testimony) - Akropolis, Pragaue, ISBN 978-80-86903-56-9, 2008
- Islamistický Trojský Kůň v České Republice (Islamic Trojan Horse in the Czech Republic) - Ostrava: Česká expedice, 2017. 118 s. ISBN 978-80-906487-2-2.
- Zindandan Çığlıklar - Qirîna Zindanan - (Screams from the Dungeon) - Yekta Uzunoğlu's book which is the first book he published in Turkey. İzan Publishing House, 2021
- Apê Mûsa 100 Yaşında! - (Musa Anter is 100 Years Old!) - A book written in memory of Musa Anter, which brought together Yekta Uzunoğlu and many well-known authors, Aram Publishing House, 2020
- Nataşa - Kurdish poet Necati Siyahkan's book, which was re-published with the prologue of Yekta Uzunoğlu, İzan Publishing House, 2021
- Bîranîn - Yekta Uzunoğlu's book which is the first Kurdish book he published in Turkey. Sitav Publishing House, 2021

TRANSLATIONS TO KURDISH

- Karel Čapek
  - R.U.R - The translation into Kurdish was completed by Dr. Yekta Uzunoglu in 1977 while studying medicine at Charles University in Prague
  - The Mother - The translation into Kurdish was completed by Dr. Yekta Uzunoglu in 1977 while studying medicine at Charles University in Prague
  - The White Disease - The translation into Kurdish was completed by Dr. Yekta Uzunoglu in 1977 while studying medicine at Charles University in Prague
  - 1974
- Molière
  - The Forced Marriage (Le Mariage forcé) - The translation into Kurdish was completed by Dr. Yekta Uzunoglu in 1977 while studying medicine at Charles University in Prague.
  - 1979
- Gospel of Luke, Bonn 1985
- Gospel of Mark, Bonn 1985
- Genesis, Bonn 1987
- Exodus, Bonn 1987

TRANSLATIONS TO CZECH

- 33 kurşun -(33 Bullets) -Translation and publication of Ahmed Arif's work into Czech, 2014 - Published by the PEN Club
- Touhou Po Tobě Mi Pouta Zrezavěla (Ahmed Arif - Hasretiden Prangalar Eskittim) - Translated by Yekta Uzunoglu, 2009, Prague - Published by the PEN Club

== See also ==
- Kurds in Turkey
- List of Kurdish scholars
