= Rafiq Sabir =

Kurdish poet

Rafiq Sabir (1950-2026) (Kurdish: Refîq Sabîr) was a contemporary Kurdish poet.

He was born in Qaladiza in Iraqi Kurdistan in 1950. In 1974, he received Bachelor of Arts degree from Baghdad University. He moved to Sweden in 1989. He writes in the Sorani dialect. He belongs to the post-Abdulla Goran generation of modernists in Kurdish poetry.

== Works ==
- Karwansara, 146 pp., Uppsala, 1990.
- Towards history : a short ideological historical study, 129 pp., Uppsala, 1991.
- Werze berdine, 39 pp., Uppsala 1992.
- Awêne û sêber : Komele honrawe, 88 pp., Arzan Publishers, Jönköping, 1996. ISBN 91-972767-1-5.
- Impiratoryayî lam : derbarey îslam, xêl û nasyonalîzm, 230 pp., Rabûn Publishers, Uppsala, 1998. ISBN 91-972767-8-2.
- Rûnbûnewe : honrawe, 111 pp., Rabûn Publishers, Uppsala, 2001. ISBN 91-973528-1-0.

== See also ==
- List of Kurdish scholars
