= Serdar Roşan =

Serdar Roşan (born 1958) is a contemporary Kurdish writer, poet and translator. He was born in Diyarbakir and after the 1980 coup emigrated to Sweden. He has published two books of poetry and three collections of short stories and Kurdish legends. Roşan has also translated nine books from foreign languages into Kurdish including classic works by Miguel de Cervantes, Guy de Maupassant, Ernest Hemingway and Jack London. He is a member of the Association of Kurdish Writers in Sweden.

== Books ==
1. Çîrokên hezar û şevekê, 143 pp., Nûdem Publishers, Sweden, 1998.
2. Bi xatirê silehan, translation of A Farewell to Arms, 345 pp., Nûdem Publishers, Sweden, 2000, ISBN 978-91-88592-50-7.
3. Mircana qelew, translation of Boule de suif, 127 pp., Nûdem Publishers, Sweden, 2000, ISBN 978-91-88592-49-1.
4. Destanên Kurdî: ji zargotina kurdî, A Collection of Kurdish legends, with Reşo Zîlan, Kurdish Cultural Foundation in Stockholm, 2004, ISBN 978-975-6282-30-4.
5. Dara gozê, Collection of short stories, 133 pp., Doz Publishers, Istanbul, 2005, ISBN 978-975-6876-58-9.
6. Bazên welat, Poems, 64 pp., Doz Publishers, Istanbul, 2005, ISBN 978-975-6876-57-2.
7. Xencer, Poems, 64 pp., Doz Publishers, Istanbul, 2007, ISBN 978-9944-2-2721-6.
8. Don Kîşot, translation of Don Quijote, 519 pp., Doz Publishers, Istanbul, 2007, ISBN 978-9944-2-2726-1.

== See also ==
- List of Kurdish scholars
