= List of Kurdish scholars =

The following is a list of people who have contributed to the Kurdish literature. This list is not comprehensive, but is continuously being expanded and includes Kurdish writers and poets from Iran (Persia), Iraq, Turkey (Ottoman Empire), Syria, Russia (Soviet Union), and European countries.

== 8th century – 9th century ==
- Jaban al-Kurdi

== 9th century ==
- Abu Hanifa Dinawari

== 11th century ==
- Ali Hariri (Elî Herîrî) (1009–1079), Kurdish poet

== 12th century ==
- Ali ibn al-Athir (1160–1233), Kurdish/Islamic historian, born in Jazira (Cizîre) region
- Fakhraddin, Yezidi saint, philosopher, poet and scholar
- Saladin (1137–1193)

== 13th century ==
- Ibn Khallikan
- Al-Shahrazuri
- Ibn al-Salah (1181-1245)
- Ibn Taymiyya (1263-1328)
- Fakhr al-Din al-Akhlati

== 14th century ==
- Mala Pareshan (1356-1416)
- Abu'l Fida (1273-1331) Kurdish, the crater Abulfeda on the Moon is named after him
- Masud ibn Namdar
- Al-Shahrazuri
- Zain al-Din al-'Iraqi (1325-1404)

== 15th century ==
- Mela Hesenê Bateyî (Melayê Batê), (1417–1491), Kurdish poet and Muslim cleric, Hakkari region
- Idris Bitlisi

== 16th century ==
- Malaye Jaziri (Melayê Cizîrî), (1570–1640), Kurdish poet and Sufi
- Sherefxan Bidlisi (1543–1599), historian and poet, author of Sharafnama

== 17th century ==
- Faqi Tayran (Feqiyê Teyran), (1590–1660), poet, author of Sheik San'an and Battle of DimDim
- Ali Taramakhi (Eliyê Teremaxî), (1591-1653), linguist and writer
- Mustafa Besarani, (1642–1701), Kurdish poet
- Ahmad Khani (Ehmedê Xanî), (1651–1707) Kurdish writer, poet, astronomer and philosopher, author of Mem û Zîn

== 18th century ==
- Khana Qubadi (Xana Qubadî), (1700–1759), Kurdish poet, author of Şîrîn û Xesrew
- Mahmud Bayazidi (1797–1859), Kurdish writer, translator and historian
- Nalî (1797–1869), Kurdish mathematician poet
- Khâlid-i Baghdâdî

== 19th century ==
- Mastoura Ardalan (1805–1848), Kurdish poet and historiographer
- Mawlawi Tawagozi (1806–1882), Kurdish poet and Sufi
- Haji Qadir Koyi (1817–1897), Kurdish poet
- Mahwi (1830–1906), Kurdish poet and Sufi
- Sheikh Rezza Talabani (1835–1910), Kurdish, Iraq
- Wafaei (1844–1902), Kurdish poet, Iran
- Edeb (1860–1918), Kurdish poet, Iran
- Piramerd (1867–1950), Kurdish poet, writer, novelist and journalist, Iraqi Kurdistan
- Mulla Effendi (1863 - December 31, 1942), Islamic philosopher, scholar, astronomer, and politician
- Said Nursi (1876–1960), Kurdish Islamic philosopher, Turkey
- Hajj Nematollah (1871–1919), mystic and poet
- Zewar (1875-1948), writer and poet

== 20th and 21st century ==
- Ibrahim Ahmad (1914–2000), Kurdish writer, novelist and translator, Iraqi Kurdistan/England
- Kajal Ahmad (born 1967), Kurdish poet, writer and journalist, Iraqi Kurdistan
- Shamil Asgarov (1928–2005), poet, researcher on the history and culture of the Kurds in Azerbaijan, translator
- Mustafa Aydogan (born 1957), Writer, novelist and translator, Sweden
- Mahmud Baksi (1944–2001), Kurdish writer and journalist, Sweden
- Rojen Barnas (born 1945), Kurdish poet and writer, Sweden
- Jalal Barzanji (born 1953), writer, poet and journalist, Canada
- Nuri Barzinji (1896–1958), poet, Iraqi Kurdistan
- Celadet Bedir Khan (Celadet Alî Bedirxan), (1893–1951), linguist, journalist and politician, founder of the Latin-based Kurdish alphabet
- Nazand Begikhani (born 1964), Kurdish writer, poet and researcher, UK
- Cigerxwîn (Cegerxwîn), (1903–1984), Kurdish poet and writer, Turkey/Syria
- Perwîz Cîhanî (born 1955), Kurdish writer, poet and novelist, Switzerland
- Hecîyê Cindî (1908–1990), Kurdish writer, linguist and researcher, Armenia
- Firat Cewerî (born 1959), Kurdish writer, translator and journalist, Sweden
- Cankurd (born 1948), Kurdish writer and poet, Germany
- Jalal Dabagh (born 1939), Kurdish writer and journalist, Sweden
- Dildar, (Yonis Reuf), (1917–1948), Kurdish poet, Iraq
- Muhamad Salih Dilan (1927–1990), One of the founders of modern Kurdish poetry
- Emînê Evdal (1906–1964), Kurdish writer and linguist, Armenia
- Abdulla Goran (1904–1962), Kurdish poet
- Ahmad Hardi (1922–2006), Kurdish poet, Iraqi Kurdistan/UK
- Choman Hardi (born 1974), Kurdish poet, researcher and painter, UK
- Rauf Hassan (born 1945), Kurdish writer and journalist, Iraqi Kurdistan
- Rafiq Hilmi (1898–1960), Kurdish writer, literary analyst and politician, Iraq
- Karim Hisami (1926–2001), Kurdish writer, Iran/Iraq/Sweden
- Fawaz Hussain (born 1953), writer and translator, France
- Karzan Kardozi (born 1983) Kurdish writer and film director, USA
- Keça Kurd (born 1948), poet, writer and linguist, Germany
- Latif Halmat (born 1947), Kurdish poet, Iraqi Kurdistan
- Nado Makhmudov (1907-1990), Kurdish writer and public figure, Armenia
- Zeki Majed (born 1996) Kurdish poet and film director, Bulgaria
- Hesenê Metê (born 1957), Kurdish writer, novelist and translator, Sweden
- Hemin Mukriyani (Hêmin Mukriyanî), (1921–1986), Kurdish journalist and poet, Iran
- Ata Nahai (born 1960), writer and novelist, Iran
- Abdulla Pashew (born 1946), contemporary Kurdish poet
- Farhad Pirbal (born 1961), Kurdish writer and academic, Iraqi Kurdistan
- Madeh Piryonesi (born 1991), engineering scholar and academic, Canada
- Khalil Rashow (born 1952), Kurdish writer and academic, Germany
- Qedrîcan (1911–1972), Kurdish poet and writer, Turkey/Syria
- Rafiq Sabir (born 1950), Kurdish poet, Sweden
- Alaaddin Sajadi (1907–1984), Kurdish writer, poet and academic, Iraqi Kurdistan
- Hejar (Abdurrahman Sharafkandi), (1920–1990), Kurdish poet, writer, translator and linguist, Iran
- Arab Shamilov (Erebê Şemo) (1897–1978), Kurdish writer and novelist, Armenia
- Farhad Shakely (born 1951), poet, writer and academic, Sweden
- Pîr Xidir Silêman (born 1952), Kurdish writer, teacher and parliamentarian, Iraqi Kurdistan
- Şahînê Bekirê Soreklî (born 1946), Kurdish writer, poet and translator, Australia
- Serdar Roşan (born 1959), writer, poet and translator, Sweden
- Têmûrê Xelîl (born 1949), translator and journalist, Sweden
- Mehmed Uzun (1953–2007), writer and novelist, Turkey/Sweden
- Yekta Uzunoglu (born 1953), Kurdish writer, translator and entrepreneur, Czech Republic/Germany
- Taufiq Wahby (1891–1984), writer and linguist, Iraq
- Azad Zal (born 1972), Kurdish poet, writer, journalist, translator and linguist, Kurdistan
- Muhamed Amin Zaki (1880–1948), writer, historian and politician, Iraqi Kurdistan
- Reşo Zîlan (born 1947), Kurdish writer, translator and linguist, Sweden
- Zeynelabidin Zinar (born 1953), Kurdish writer, researcher and specialist in Kurdish folklore, Sweden

== See also ==
- Kurdish people
- List of Kurdish people
- List of Kurdish poets and authors
- Kurdistan
- Sharafnama
- Mem and Zin
