= Fawaz Hussain =

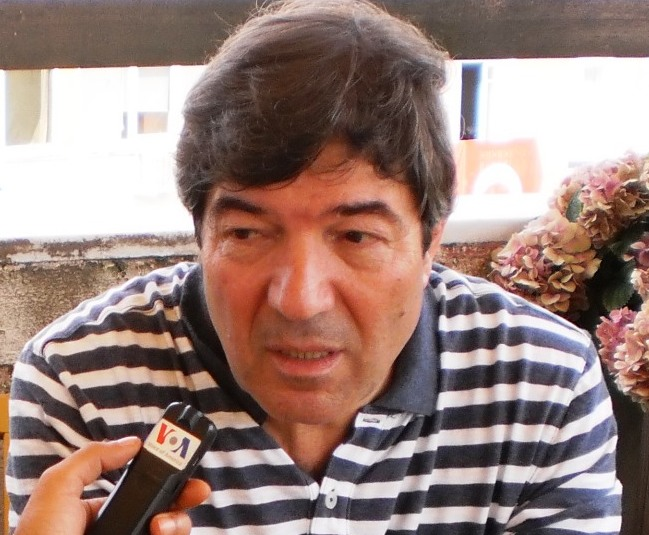
Fawaz Hussain

Fawaz Hussain or Fawaz Husên (born 1953), is a contemporary Kurdish writer and translator. He was born in northeastern Syria. He pursued his studies in Sorbonne from 1978 to 1992, and received PhD in French language and literature in 1988. He is a member of Swedish Writers' Union and French Writers' Syndicate. In addition to Kurdish, he has written several books in French and has translated works of Albert Camus and Saint-Exupéry into Kurdish.

== Books ==
1. Siwarên êsê, Novel, 111 pp., Welat Publishers, Stockholm, 1994. ISBN 91-972197-0-3
2. Le Fleuve, Short Story in French, Méréalê Publishers, Paris, 1997. Réédition. Le Rocher/Le Serpent à Plumes/ Motifs.
3. Dîroka edebiyata Fransî : sedsala hivdehan û hijdehan, (History of French Literature), 151 pp., Apec Publishers, 1998. ISBN 91-89014-32-4
4. Chroniques boréales. Short story in French, L’Harmattan Publishers, Paris, 2000.
5. Amîdabad, Short story, 106 pp., Avesta Publishers, Istanbul, 2002. ISBN 975-7112-94-1
6. Prof dans une ZEP ordinaire, 285 pp., Paris, 2006. ISBN 2-268-05815-8
7. Les Sables de Mésopotamie, 312 pp. Paris, Rocher Publishers, 2007. ISBN 978-2-268-06144-3
8. En direction du vent, 112 pp. Paris, Non Lieu Publishers, 2010, ISBN 978-2-35270-080-7
9. Parîsabad. Istanbul. Avesta, 2010.
10. Barê Sevê. Istanbul, Avesta, 2012. ISBN 978-605-5279-03-5
11. La prophétie d'Abouna. publisher Ginkgo Editeur, Paris, 2013. ISBN 978-2-84679-218-9
12. Orages pèlerins, éditions du Serpent à Plumes, juin 2016. 172 pages. ISBN 979-10-9468-069-8
13. Les Sables de Mésopotamie, éditions Points, novembre 2016. 288 pages. ISBN 978-2-7578-6305-3
14. Le Rêveur des bords du Tigre, éditions Les Escales, 2017. 172 pages. ISBN 9782365693394
15. Le Syrien du septième étage, éditions Le Serpent à Plumes, 2018, 231 pages. ISBN 979-10-97390-50-1
16. Les Kurdes aussi savent rêver, éditions Frantz Fanon, Algérie, Tizi-Ouzou, 2019, 187 pages.{ISBN 978-9931-572-70-1}
17. Le Kurde qui regardait passer les nuages, éditions Zinédi, 2019, 115 pages. ISBN 978-2-84859-203-9
18. Murcie, sur les pas d'Ibn Arabi, éditions du Jasmin, 2020, 138 pages.ISBN 978-2-35284-236-1
19. A mon père, mon repère, éditions du Jasmin, 2021, 205 pages. ISBN 9782352842392
20. Un été en vrac, éditions Al Manar, 2023, 88 pages. ISBN 978-2-36426-317-8
21. Un Kurde à Ithaque, éditions Zinédi, 2023, 252 pages. ISBN 978-2-84859-261-9
22. Par le souffle de Sayat-Nova, Voyage en Arménie et en Géorgie, éditions Transboréal, 184 pages.ISBN 978-2-36157-355-3

== Translations ==
1. Biyanî, Translation of L’Étranger by Albert Camus, Stockholm, Nûdem Publishers, Stockholm, 1995.
2. Mîrzayê Piçûk, Translation of Le Petit Prince by Antoine de Saint-Exupéry, Nûdem Publishers, Stockholm, 1995.
3. La Poursuite de l'ombre, Translation of Siya Evînê by Mehmed Uzun into French, 248 pp., Phébus Publishers, Paris, 1999. ISBN 2-85940-636-0
4. Kurdên Haymanayê, Translation of Les Kurdes de L'Haïmaneh by Georges Perrot into Kurdish, 111 pp., Apec Publishers, Sweden, 2000. ISBN 91-89014-64-2
5. Mesa bi serhiskî û Agirê koçer. Translation av Gérard Chaliand book Marche têtue et Feu nomade. Istanbul. Avesta, 2005.
6. Mîrzayê Piçûk. New translation of "Le Petit Prince" by Antoine de Saint-Exupéry. Istanbul, Avesta, 2011.
7. Biyanî. Albert Camus L'Etranger. Istanbul, Avesta, 2012. ISBN 978-605-5279-13-4
8. Le Promeneur d'Alep. Niroz Malek. Traduit de l'arabe (Syrie), Le Serpent à Plumes, 2015. ISBN 979-10-94680-19-3.
9. Les Anciennes Nuits. Niroz Malek. Traduit de l'arabe (Syrie), Le Serpent à Plumes, 2017. 363 pages. ISBN 9791097390037
10. Mêrê ku kevir bilind dikirin, Mêrê bi guhê jêkirî, Mêrê ku ti$tekî wî nebû, Her sê $ekir û her sê gunehên mezin, quatre titres de Jean-Claude Mourlevat traduits en kurde.Istanbul, éditions Avesta, ISBN 978-625-7253-63-5.
11. Bîra bîra min, Mémoire de ma mémoire, de Gérard Chaliand. Istanbul, éditions Avesta, 2024. 87 pages.{ISBN 978-625-8383-86-7}

== See also ==
- List of Kurdish scholars
