= Şahînê Bekirê Soreklî =

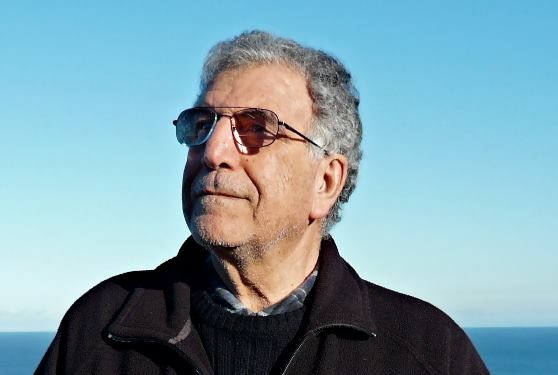

Şahînê Bekirê Soreklî or Shahin Bekir Sorekli or Chahin Baker (born 1946) is a Kurdish writer, poet, journalist and translator.

Sorekli dedicated most of his life to the Kurdish language and the Kurdish cause and has played important roles advancing the Kurdish community as well as multiculturism in Australia in the eighties and nineties. He founded the first Kurdish association in Australia in 1979.

Many poems of Mr.Sorekli were sung by Nizamettin Ariç or Feqiyê Teyran such as (Zînê, Mihemedo, Kenê li Ser Bîrê, Jiyana Jineke Kurd (Eyşo), Ku De çûn, Dayê Rojek tê, Mîro, Cemîle),the most famous song is Dayê Rojek tê The poem was first sung by Nizamettin Ariç.It was later sung by Aynur Doğan and others without seeking permission or even writing the name of the writer.

== Early life and education ==
He was born in the village of Mezrê in the Kurdish region of Kobani in Syria. He left Syria to Austria following matriculation in October 1965 and moved to Australia from Germany on 29 October 1968. He was hoping to be able to work for a year or two and return to Munich where he was studying but this did not eventuate. He met his wife Robyn Hyde while working for MAN Diesel in Kurri Kurri, NSW. They married in January 1971 and have two sons, Che and Shahn. In 1977, Soreklî was graduated from Macquarie University in Sydney with the combined degrees BA and Diploma of Education DipEd. He later acquired further qualifications in journalism, broadcasting, and the teaching of German.

== Career ==
From 1978 to 2004, he was employed by New South Wales Department of Education and Training as a teacher and consultant. In 1979, he was elected as the head of the first Kurdish association in Australia and managed it for about six years. Between 1982 and 1983, he broadcast a one-hour long Kurdish English weekly program at 2SER FM Radio in Sydney. He was the founder of SBS Kurdish in 1984 beginning with Radio 2EA and remained the Editing Producer/broadcaster until retirement in 2015. His short stories, articles and poems have been published in many Kurdish newspapers, magazines and websites.

== Broadcast in Sydney ==
Mr.Sorekli chose to broadcast in Kurdish because of his love for his mother tongue and because the Kurdish language was oppressed and there was no radio in Kurdish language where he came from. he also hoped it would benefit SBS Radio that broadcast in 68 ethnic languages and the Kurds in Australia and contribute to establishing a united community as he said on an interview

== His Passion for the Kurdish Language ==
As a writer in Kurmanji Kurdish he remained disappointed with the limited numbers of readers. This, however, did not discourage him to serve the Kurdish language in various ways, including the teaching of Kurdish grammar using Social Media. "As Kurdish (Kurmanji) writers we often face a wall because we cannot communicate with the masses as well as we would like to," Sorekli says. "As a result of being illiterate in their own language the mentality of many Kurds today has become much closer to the mentality of the people whose language they use, mainly Turkish, Arabic or Farsi (referring to Persian)," he adds.

== His Advice For Kurdish Youth In The Diaspora and Kurdistan ==
Thirty years ago he might have given different advice. His advice to the younger generation is to have an aim in life and to pursue that aim with discipline and determination. "I would advise them to pursue a profession they like, a profession that can secure a job for them and guarantee progress both financially and professionally. Today’s circumstances also require people to be multi-skilled and ready to change professions. In today’s world the first university degree may not secure you a good position. Individuals may have to do a second degree or postgraduate degrees."

== Involvement In Politics ==
"Look at the Kurds in Australia, for instance. We don’t have a single high-ranking politician from Kurdish background. We may find parliamentarians, in some cases ministers, or successful business people of Italian, Greek, Armenian, Arab and Assyrian backgrounds but no one from Kurdish background." He advises the Kurdish people to follow in the steps of advanced democracies where free thinking, mutual respect and intellectual awakening are a reality. If this is the preference then hard work, planning, group-work, discipline and cooperation is needed, all of which are lacking amongst most Kurdish societies today. The new generation of politicians need to vitalise a machine that can create those requirements in order to overcome political and social corruption, internal hostilities and decayed political and religious ideologies. A new ideology is needed that can organise peaceful and constructive struggle to secure the legitimate rights of the Kurdish people in the country they are in at this stage.

== Some of Shahin Sorekli's Works ==
"Roja Dawîn ji Jiyana Mistê Kurê Salha Temo" (short story, Hêvî Journal, Kurdish Institute of Paris, 1982)

- "Civata Pêxemberan" (short story, Hêvî Journal, 1983)
- "Azadbûna Mehmet Karataş" (short story: 1985)
- Wendabûn (Novel: 1987)
- translation of The Lost Honour of Katharina Blum by Heinrich Böll (1997)
- Em û Pirsa me (collection of articles, 1987)
- Mehkemekirina Selahiddinê Eyûbî (play, 1989)
- Jana Heft Salan (poetry, 1990)
- Namûsa Emo (collection of short stories, 1994)
- Pisîk jî Xewmnan Dibînin (2004)
- Çîrokên 18 Salan (collection of short stories, 2005)
- Veger (Novel: 2006)
- Destana Dewrêşê Evdî (2019)
- Nameyek ji Bavê min re (collection of short stories: 2009)
- Helbestên ji Dil (collection of poems: 2019)
- “55 short stories in 38 years,”,"55 Çîrokên 38 salan" was published by AVA publications in the Kurdish town Kobani.(collection of short stories: 2020)
- Kurd, Cîhan, Jîyan: 252 Gotarên bi mijarên ji dîroka me ya nûjen û rûdanên li Rojhilatê Navîn û cîhanê 1990-2020. Weşanên Pîrê, Viyena, 10/2021

== Some of Shahin Sorekli's Short Stories- In Kurdish ==
- Mirina Xezalekê: 1981
- Rojek ji Jiyana Mistê kurê Salha Temo: 1982
- Kombûna Pêxemberan: 1983
- Kujtina Du Mirovên Belengaz: 1983
- Azadbûna M. K: 1984
- Hindiyên Sor: 1984
- Vegera malê: 1986
- Namûsa Êmo 1986 - Kurteroman
- Hîn Hebû Hêvî: 1987
- Henry Armstrong Chû Cengê: 1987
- ÇIVÎK JI SER DARAN KETIN
- Nedî û Danestan: 1988
- Rêwiyê Mirî: 1988
- Karl Federmann: 1990
- Payîz: 1992
- Kujtina Rojê: 1993
- Kûto: 1993
- John Hyde: 1994
- Firrîn: 1996
- Pisîk jî Xewnan Dibînin: 1996
- Xwekujtina Nameyekê: 1996
- Afrîkayê Ma Te Dît: 1997
- Rojîn: 1999
- Parsger: 1999
- Xweziya Ne Mirov bûma: 1999
- Shkeft: 2000
- Stemkarî û Hestên Tawanê: 2000
- Mebesta Chîrokê: 2002
- Bi Navê Xwedê: 2006
- Profesor û Rîhrengîn: 2007
- Hosteyê Koshka Hilweshiyayî: 2008
- Telefonkirineke Janafer: 2008
- Pîvaz : 2008
- Xizanî: 2008
- Xewnekê Bifroshe Min: 200?
- Zarok û Dar: 2013
- Pira Hilweshiyaî: 2015
- Ya Shamî û Rojên Demê: 2015
- Kobanî û Kalê bi ber Leheya Tofanê Ketî: 2017

== See also ==
- List of Kurdish scholars
