= Kurmancî =

Kurmancî may refer to:

- Kurmancî (magazine), a Kurdish linguistic magazine
- Kurmanji (also known as Northern Kurdish), a Kurdish dialect spoken in Turkey, Iran, Iraq and Syria

== See also ==
- Kirmancki or Zaza, a language spoken primarily in Eastern Turkey
