= Rauf Hassan =

Kurdish writer

- ڕەئووف حەسەن
- Born: Rauf Hassan; 1945; Sulaymaniyah, Iraq
- Died: 21 December 2018 (aged 72–73); Sulaymaniyah, Kurdistan Region
- Resting place: Saiwan Cemetery, Sulaymaniyah
- Spouse: Laila Hama Ali
- Children: Zana Rauf; Shero Rauf

Rauf Hassan (Kurdish: ڕەئووف حەسەن) is a Kurdish writer who was born in 1945 in the city of Sulaymaniyah in the Iraqi Kurdistan.

He was imprisoned during the rule of the Ba'ath Party regime, because of his critical articles he wrote against the Ba'ath Party regime in Iraq. He is also conspired as one of the primary writers for revolution in Iraqi Kurdistan.

An accomplished linguist, he also founded the Kurdish Dialog Center. He has two sons Zana Rauf (b 1970) and Shero Rauf (b 1979).

== Works ==
=== Astronomy ===
1. Gardoon (1967) ... Universe

=== Short stories and Novels ===
1. Chakara (1973) ... Short Story
2. Sbaine Bawkt Detawa (1979) ... Your father will be back tomorrow - Short Stories
3. Darzi Azhni Khamakan (1988)... Preface - Critics
4. Wenakai Khushkt (1999) .... Your sister's photo - Short Stories
1. Khori Tar or Kochi Sur (1999).... The Darkness sun or Red Departuer - Novel
2. Cheman… Koleltrin Shazadai Jihan (2018).... Cheman… Saddest Princess in the World - Novel

=== Journalism ===
1. Alfa u Betay Rozhnamagari (1999).... The Journalism Alphabet .
2. Govary Rojnamawany u Halsangandnek (2006) ... Journalism Magazine and a description .
3. La bainman darnachet ... Special lines in several magazines and newspaper that continue for more than 23 years.
4. Hawalneri Telefizioni ... TV Journalist (2011)

=== Plays ===
1. Janaby Mufatish ... Translation - stageplay
2. Aw Piawai bu ba Sag ... The man who become a Dog Translation - stageplay
3. Charanusi mrov ... The destiny of a Human - Translation - stageplay
4. Zyani Tutn ... Danger of Tobacco stageplay
5. Khwardngay Mimuni zindoo ... Living monkeys Restaurant stageplay
6. Paikar .... The Statue ... stageplay
7. Malai sar grdaka .... Mala from the top of the Hill ... Translation TV Stageplay
8. Didari Sarak Komar (2004) ... Meeting with the President - Short Stories For stageplay

1- Kaligola la awenay amro da ... Caligula before today's mirror

2- Komediai bargi afsunawi ... The Comedy of the magic costume

3- Hawaldz ... The Spy

4- Mroveki assayi ... Normal Human Being

5- Nawrozi alkan

6- Didari sarok komar ... Meeting of the president

=== Translations ===
1. Tiori Nisbi (1984) ... theory of relativity by Albert Einstein - Translation
2. Hunari Jang (2004)... The Art of War by Sun Tzu - Translation
3. Sofigareti Nikos Kazantzakis (2005) - Culture - Translation
4. Ktebi dwhami "Taw" - Second book of Taw (2005) - Translation
5. Kurdnasi (2006) - Culture - Translation

=== Interview with Rauf Hassan ===
1. Marks u marksizmi Kurdi u Ayin (2007) ... Marx, Kurdish Marxism and Religion - Culture
2. Keshai afratan u bzutnawai zhnan (2008) .. Female problems and women activity .. from P:673 to P:714 - Interview

=== Literary criticism ===
1. Krekar u Chiroki Kurdi (1982) ... Workers and Kurdish Stories
2. Andesha Jwanakani roh la Chiroki kurdida (2005) ... The Beautiful fantasy of soul in Kurdish story - Culture
3. Xulyay meymune spiyekan la chiroki kurdida (2007) ... Habits of the white Monkeys in Kurdish stories - Culture
4. Andesha Jwanakani roh la shieri kurdida (2007) ... The Beautiful fantasy of soul in Kurdish poem - Culture

=== Television ===
1. Telefzioni Harem ... Harem Television - Director Cameraman Manager
2. Ktebi Hafta ... Book of the week - television host program
3. Govari Roshnbiry ... Culture Magazin in Karkuk TV
4. Haftay baseki hunari ... Every week and an Art discussion ...

== See also ==
- List of Kurdish scholars
