= Armani Bolaghi =

Armani Bolaghi ارمني بلاغي
- Village
- Location within Iran
- Coordinates: 36°47′00″N 46°15′00″E
- Country: Iran
- Province: West Azerbaijan
- County: Bukan
- Bakhsh: Simmineh
- Rural District: Akhtachi-ye Mahali

Population (2006)
  - Total: 388
- Time zone: UTC+3:30 (IRST)
  - Summer (DST): UTC+4:30 (IRDT)

Armani Bolaghi (Persian: ارمني بلاغي, also Romanized as Armanī Bolāghī; also known as Kānī Gol, Arman Bolāghī, and Armanī Bulāgh) is a village in Akhtachi-ye Mahali Rural District, Simmineh District, Bukan County, West Azerbaijan Province, Iran. At the 2006 census, its population was 388, in 70 families.

== Notable people ==
- Edeb
