= Keça Kurd =

Kurdish writer, poet, linguist, and translator

Keça Kurd (born 1948) is a contemporary Kurdish writer, poet, linguist and translator. She was born in the village of Xirbê Cihûya in northeastern Syria. She received her bachelor's degree in Qamishli and continued her studies in Kurdish literature at the University of Sulaimani from 1972 to 1974. She is now residing in Germany.

== Books ==
1. Çîrokine Helbijartî, Translation of a collection of Aziz Nesin's stories, Beirut, 1990.
2. Xoybûn, Civata Serxwebûna Kurdî (1927-1946), Translation from Arabic, Damascus, 1993.
3. Peywendiyên kurd û Ermeniyan (The Relationship of Kurds and Armenians), Translation from Arabic, 1994.
4. Qesara Min, Collection of Poems, Beirut, 1996.
5. Kopê Qurbanî, Collection of Poems, Beirut, 1996.
6. Lêkolînek Li Ser Giramera Zimanê Kurdî (An Analysis of the Grammar of the Kurdish Language), 2001.
7. Zayenda Mê û Nêr (Masculine and Feminine Genders in Kurdish Grammar), 91 pp., Free University of Berlin Publishers, 2001.
8. Pela Dawî, Collection of Poems, 2002.
9. Êsê û Bilodo, Children's story, Evra Publishers, Berlin, 2003.

== See also ==
- List of Kurdish scholars
