= Jalal Barzanji =

Kurdish-Canadian poet

- Born: 1 July 1953; Ashkaftsaqa, Kurdistan, Iraq
- Citizenship: Canadian, Kurdish
- Occupations: Poet, Writer, Activist
- Writing career
- Language: English, Kurdish
- Notable works: "The Man in Blue Pyjamas", "Trying Again to Stop Time"
- Notable awards: 2004 RISE award, Honorary Doctorate of Letters, Edmonton City Hall of Fame

Jalal Barzanji (July 1, 1953) is a contemporary Kurdish poet, writer and activist known for his multifaceted contributions to literature and culture, in Iraqi Kurdistan and Canada.

Barzanji served on the board of Writers' Union in Iraqi Kurdistan, fleeing in 1996 due to the Iraqi-Kurdish Civil War. In Canada, he and was appointed as the PEN Canada Writer-in-Exile in 2007. A Doctor of Letters, honoris causa (D. Litt.) recipient of the University of Alberta, he was also inducted into the Edmonton City Hall of Fame in 2015 for contributions in Art and Culture.

Barzanji has published numerous books of poetry in English and Kurdish. His critically acclaimed memoir, "The Man in Blue Pyjamas" was published by University of Alberta Press in 2011. In the memoir Barzanji writes about his imprisonment in 1986–1989, during which he endured torture under Saddam Hussein’s regime due to his literary and journalistic achievements—writing that openly explores themes of peace, democracy, and freedom. For those three years, Barzanji wrote only on scrap paper, smuggled into his cell. He wrote his memoir during his time as the first Writer in Exile of PEN Canada.

== Life and career ==
=== Early life ===
Kurdish poet and journalist Jalal Barzanji was born in 1953 in Ashkaftsaqa, a remote village situated in Northern Iraq, within the region of Kurdistan. The exact date of his birth is unknown, though thought to be Spring, and is listed as July 1 by the Iraqi government who assigned birthdays to Kurdish citizens. Barzanji grew up in a secluded village, where the establishment of the village's inaugural school came when he was 7 years old. Barzanji reflected on his upbringing as being enveloped by serene landscapes, focused on the simplicity of life amidst towering mountains.

After his family's home in Ashkaftsaqa was destroyed during his first-grade year, an event linked to Iraqi military actions following an evacuation, Barzanji's family relocated to the Kurdish capital, Erbil. In Erbil, he spent significant time in the city's renowned library, engaging in reading and other intellectual activities. His interest in learning led him to earn a degree in education, after which he worked as a teacher and served as a leader and mentor for emerging writers. His editorial work at The Voice, a magazine closed by Iraqi authorities for allegedly disseminating anti-government views, reflected his engagement with issues such as freedom, self-determination, and cultural expression.

During a period of harsh censorship, Barzanji would go on to author five volumes of poetry, which eventually led to his incarceration by Iraqi security forces.

=== Relocation to Canada ===
On his release from detention, he relocated his family to Edmonton in 1998. There, Barzanji resumed his literary career, working with organizations such as The Writers Guild of Alberta and the Edmonton Stroll for Poets Society. In 2007, he assumed the inaugural role of PEN Writer-in-Exile, where he would release his literary memoir, "The Man in Blue Pyjamas." Honored as a 2015 inductee into Edmonton's Hall of Fame for his contributions to the arts and culture, Barzanji was also credited with founding initiatives in the Canadian-Kurdish community. In 2022 he was awarded an honorary doctor of letters degree from the University of Alberta.

== See also ==
- List of Kurdish scholars

== Works ==
- 1979: The Dawning of the Evening Snow, Collection of Poems
- 1985: Unwarm, Rashid Publishing, Baghdad
- 1996: War, Gew Books, Iraqi Kurdistan
- 2002: Holy Rain, Kurdish Ministry of Culture Publishing
- 2006: Memory of a Person Under the Wind, Bedrxan Publishers, Iraqi Kurdistan
- 2007: On Going back to Birth Place, Mnara Publishers, Iraqi Kurdistan
- 2011: The Man in Blue Pyjamas, University of Alberta Press, Edmonton, Alberta
- 2015: Trying Again to Stop Time, Selected Poems, University of Alberta Press, Edmonton, Alberta
