= Joyce Blau =

Egyptian-French linguist (1932–2024)

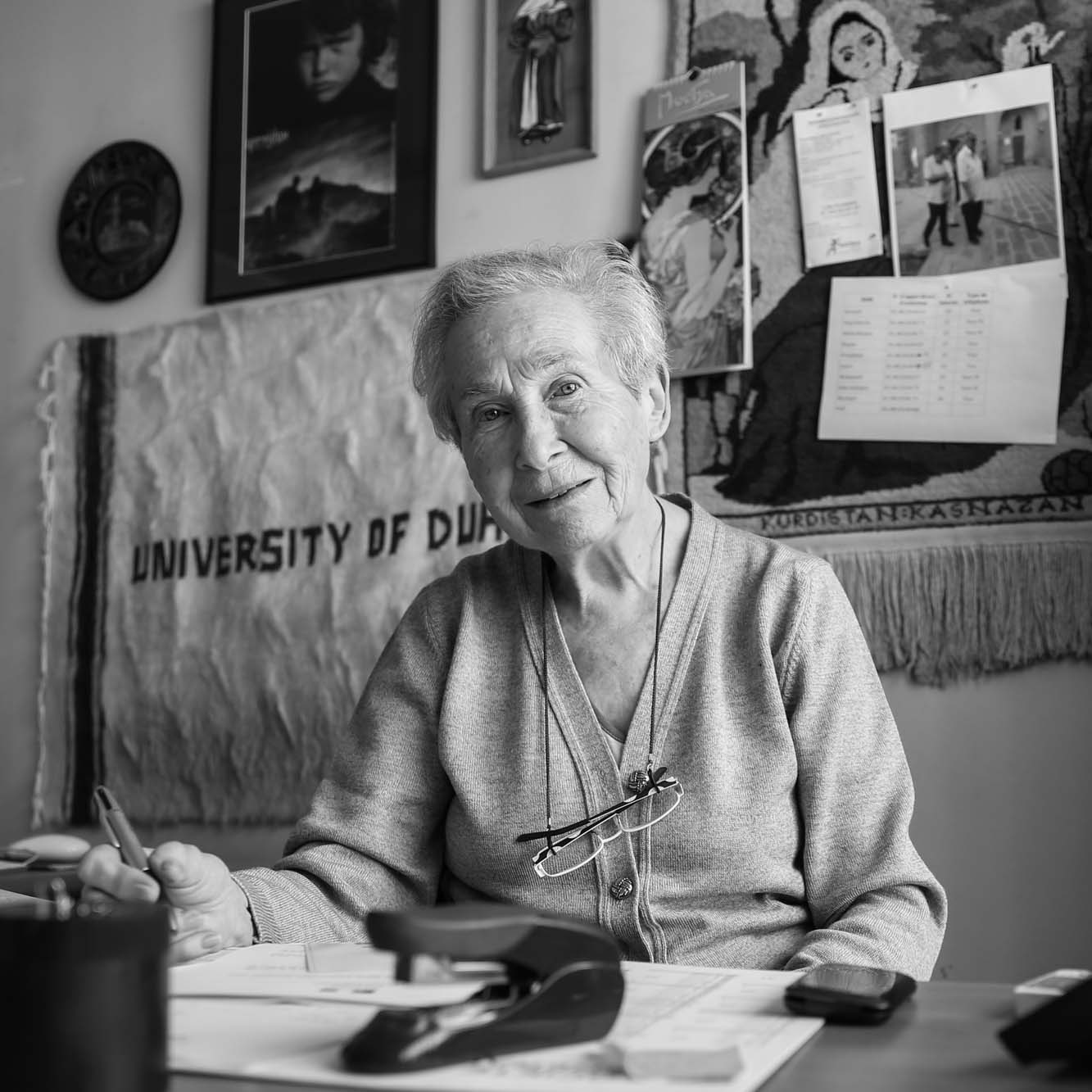
- Born: 18 March 1932; Cairo, Egypt
- Died: 24 October 2024 (aged 92); France
- Occupation: Linguist

Joyce Blau (18 March 1932 – 24 October 2024) was an Egyptian-born French linguist who specialised in Kurdish language and literature.

Joyce Blau, editor-in-chief of Kurdish Studies, taught at the National Institute of Oriental Languages and Civilizations (INALCO). She was a member of the research team "Monde Iranien" of CNRS, author of numerous studies on the language, literature and civilization of the Kurds.

Blau was a close associate of the left-wing activist Henri Curiel and shared in much of his activities, starting when both were living in Egypt and continuing during many years of shared French exile. Following Curiel's assassination in 1978, Joyce Blau founded and headed the Comité Palestine et Israël Vivront, which throughout the 1980s continued Curiel's work in promoting dialogue between the PLO and Israeli Peace Movement. Blau was an anti-Zionist.

Blau died in France on 24 October 2024, at the age of 92.

== Publications ==
- 1963, The Kurdish problem, sociological and historical essay, publication of the Center for the Study of the Problems of the Contemporary Muslim World, Brussels, 80 p. + a card.
- 1964, "Intercommunity Relations in Iraq", in: Studies, Correspondence d'Orient, n ° 5-6, published by the Center for the Study of the Problems of the Contemporary Muslim World, Brussels, p. 87-102.
- 1965, "Three texts of Kurdish folklore", in: Etudes, Correspondence d'Orient, published by the Center for the Study of the Problems of the Contemporary Muslim World, Brussels, pp. 29–50.
- 1965, Kurdish Dictionary / Kurdish Dictionary, Center for the Study of the Problems of the Contemporary Muslim World, Brussels.
- 1966, "Iraq," in: Minorities and Dissent in Muslim Countries, Acta Orientalia Belgica, Brussels, p. 237-240.
- 1968, Kurdish Kurmandji Modern Texts, Introduction, Selection and Glossary, Iranische Text, ed. by Georges Redard, Otto Harrassowitz, Wiesbaden, 58 p.
- 1975, The Kurd of 'Amadiya and Djabal Sindjar, linguistic analysis, folklore texts, glossaries, Works of the Institute of Iranian Studies of the University of the New Sorbonne, Klincksieck, 252 p.
- 1975, Ferheng kurdî û Tirkî, publ. Sivan, Federal Republic of Germany, 109 p.
- 1977, Translation from Russian of I.O. Oranskij, The Iranian languages, preface by Gilbert Lazard, Institute of Iranian Studies of the Sorbonne Nouvelle University, C. Klincksieck, Paris 239 p. + 1 card.
- 1980, Handbook of Kurdish, Sorani dialect, C. Klincksieck, 287 p.
- 1980, "Djassem Djelil", in: Dictionary of Authors of all time and all countries, Laffont-Bompiani, coll. "Books" (2e) ed., P. 545.
- 1982, "The Kurds," in: Frontiers, Border Problems in the Third World, L'Harmattan, Paris VII University, pp. 128–135.
- 1983, "Studies of Kurdish linguistics and lexicographies: historical and current developments", in: Verbum, Revue de linguistique published by the University of Nancy II, Vol. VI, fasc, 1/2, pp. 2–18.
- 1984, "The Kurdish National Movement", in: Les Temps Modernes, no. 456-457, Turkey, from authoritarian reformism to muscular liberalism, pp. 447–461.
- 1984, "Problems in the unification of the Kurdish Language", in: New Pesh Merga, no. 18, Nacka (Sweden), p. 14-19.
- 1984, Memory of Kurdistan, a collection of oral and written literary tradition, preface Maxime Rodinson, editions Findakly Paris, 221 p.
- 1984, "A short story by Hassan Mela Ali Qizilji, Diwakhane tea", in: Le Monde Diplomatique, June.
- 1985, Articles: "Chamilov" (Ereb Semo), Djagarkhwin (Cegerxwin), Goran (Abdullah Sulayman), Hawar (Appeal), Khani (Ahmadê Khanî), Koyi (Hadji Qadir Koyi), Kurdish (Kurdish literature), in: Historical, thematic and technical dictionary of LITTERATURES, Larousse, Paris.
- 1985, "The Jews in Kurdistan", in: Linguistic Mixes Offered to Maxime Rodinson by Students, Colleagues and Friends, ed. Christian Robin, Geuthner, Paris pp. 123–132.
- 1985, "Mirîna Hesen Qizilcî (The Death of Hasan Qizilcî)", in Hevi, No. 4, Kurdish Institute of Paris, p. 7-10.
- 1986, Kurdish Tales, International Council of the French Language, coll. Fleuve et Flamme, Paris 1986, 167 p.
- 1986, "Bîranîna Thomas Bois (In memory of Thomas Bois)", in: Hêvî, N ° 4, Kurdish Institute of Paris, pp. 11–13.
- 1986, "Mirina zanayê mezin Qanatê Kurdo (Death of the great scholar Kanatê Kurdoev)", p. 7 - 15; and "Hêmin jî mir (Hêmin is also deceased)" pp. 19–24, in: Hêvî, kovara çandiya gistî, n ° 5, Kurdish Institute of Paris.
- 1986, "Qanate Kurdoev, 1908-1985", in: Studia Iranica, Volume 15 - fasc. 2, Publ. of the Association for the Advancement of Iranian Studies, CNRS, Paris, p. 249-256.
- 1987, "My days, from Goran, "The Pain of the People (Jani Gel), by Ibrahim Ahmed", "Black Wound (Birîna Res / Kara yara)" by Musa Anter ", in: Dictionary of works of all ages and all countries, Literature, philosophy, music, coll. Books, 5th ed. Paris.
- 1988, "Gulchine, a Kurdish tale", in: Bulletin of the Alumni Association of the National Institute of Oriental Languages and Civilizations, pp. 57–61.
- 1988, "Bibliography of Kurdology books since the founding of the Kurdish Institute of Paris: 1983-1985", in: Studia Kurdica.
- 1989, "Kurd", "Gurânî", "Zâzâ", in: Compendium Linguarum Iranicarum, edited collective work dir. Rüdiger Schmitt, Wiesbaden, pp. 326–340.
- 1989, "The Kurdish lori", in: Iranian-Aryan Studies Available to Gilbert Lazard, Studia Iranica, Cahier 7, pp. 37–58.
- 1990, "The role of the Naqshbandi sheikhs in the Kurdish national movement", in: Naqshbandis, Paths and Current Situation of a Muslim Mystical Order, ed. by Marc Gaborieau, Alexandre Popovic and Thierry Zarcone, Editions Isis, Istanbul-Paris, p. 371-377.
- 1990, "Reform of Kurdish", in: The Reform of Languages, ed. Claude Hagège and I. Fodor, Cologne.
- 1990, The Kurds and the Kurdistan, Critical Bibliography 1977 - 1986, French Institute of Research in Iran, Tehran-Paris, 146 p.
- 1990, Preface to the book I Curdi nella Storia, Mirella Galletti, ed. Vecchio Faggio, Rome.
- 1991, "Kurdish Language and Literature", in: International Conference of Paris 14–15 October 1989, The Kurds: Human Rights and Cultural Identity, Kurdish Institute of Paris, p. 44-50.
- 1991, Kurtçe / Türkçe, Kürtçe / Fransizca, Kürtçe / Ingilizce Sözlük, Kurdish / Turkish / French / English dictionary, Sosyal Yayinlar, Istanbul, 342 p.
- 1991, "The Poetry of Kurdistan, Kurdish National Unity", in: The Word and I, Publication of the Washington Times Corporation, Vol. 6, No. 8, Washington, p. 623-637.
- 1992, "The Kurds," in: Historians and Geographers, No. 336, May–June, The Middle East in Paris, p. 305-320.
- 1992, "Die Wissenschaft von der Kurdischen Sprache", in: Kurden, Azadi Freihheit in de Bergen, Alfred Janata, Karin Kren und Maria Anna Six, Schallaburg, November 1992, Katalog des NÖ Landesmuseums, Neue Folge Nr 294, Wien, pp. 180–191.
- 1992, "Kurdische Literatur," p. 192-205.
- 1993, "The cagani: lori or Kurdish?", In: Studia Iranica, Volume 22, fasc. 1, publ. Association for the Advancement of Iranian Studies, Paris, p. 93-119.
- 1994, "Goran", "Literature in Gorani", "Folklore and Kurdish literature", "Mem o Zin", in: Universal Dictionary of Literature, Presses universitaires de France, pub. under the direction of Béatrice Didier.
- 1994, Kürtler ve Kurdistan, elistirel bir bibliyografya 1977 - 1990, Mezopotamya, Sweden, 165 p.
- 1994, "Deldar Yunes", in: Encyclopædia Iranica, Vol. VII, fasc. 3, Mazda, California, p. 238.
- 1994, "Kurdish literature", in: The Kurds and the States, Mediterranean Peoples, n ° 68-69, pp. 77–94.
- 1995, "Kurdish literature", in: The Kurds and the States, Mediterranean Peoples, n ° 68-69, July–December, pp. 77–93.
- 1995, "Kurdologie als Spiegel der Politischen Situation", in: Kurdologie, Bibliotek Feqiyê Teyran, Berlin, pp. 43–56.
- 1995, "Jiyan û berhemên Ehmedê Xanî (1650-1707)", in: Çira, kovara komeleya nivîskarên kurd the Swêdê, sal 1, hejmar 3.
- 1995, "Life and Work of Thomas Bois, 1900-1975", in: Journal of Kurdish Studies, Vol. 1, Peeters Press, Leuven, pp. 85–96.
- 1996, "Kurdish written literature", in: Kurdish Culture and Identity, ed. Philip Kreyenbroek & Christine Allison, Zed Books, Middle Eastern Studies pp. 20–28.
- 1999, Manual of Kurdish Kurdish, in collaboration with Veysi Barak, L'Harmattan, 225 p.
- 1999, "Relations between Jews and Muslims in Kurdistan", in: Islam of the Kurds, The Annals of the Other Islam, No. 5, INALCO, Paris, p. 199-224.
- 2000, Method of Kurdish Sorani, The Harmattan, 323 p.
- 2000, "The development of Kurdish literature in the city", in: The Journal of Kurdish Studies, vol. III, 1998-2000, Louvain, Peeters Press, p. 85-91.
- 2005, "Kurdish literature", in: Passerelles, Kurdistan, Revue d'Etudes interculturelles, Thionville, pp. 287–296.
- 2010, "Written Kurdish Literature", in: Oral Literature of Iranian Languages, ed. by Philip G. Kreyenbroek & Ulrich Marzolph, A History of Persian Literature XVIII, I.B. Tauris, pp. 1–31.
- 2012, "Kurdish Literature," in: Kurdish Studies, Kurdish Literature, The Harmattan, pp. 5–36.

== See also ==
- Kurdish Institute of Paris
