= Zeki Majed =

Bulgarian-Kurdish filmmaker and poet (born 1996)

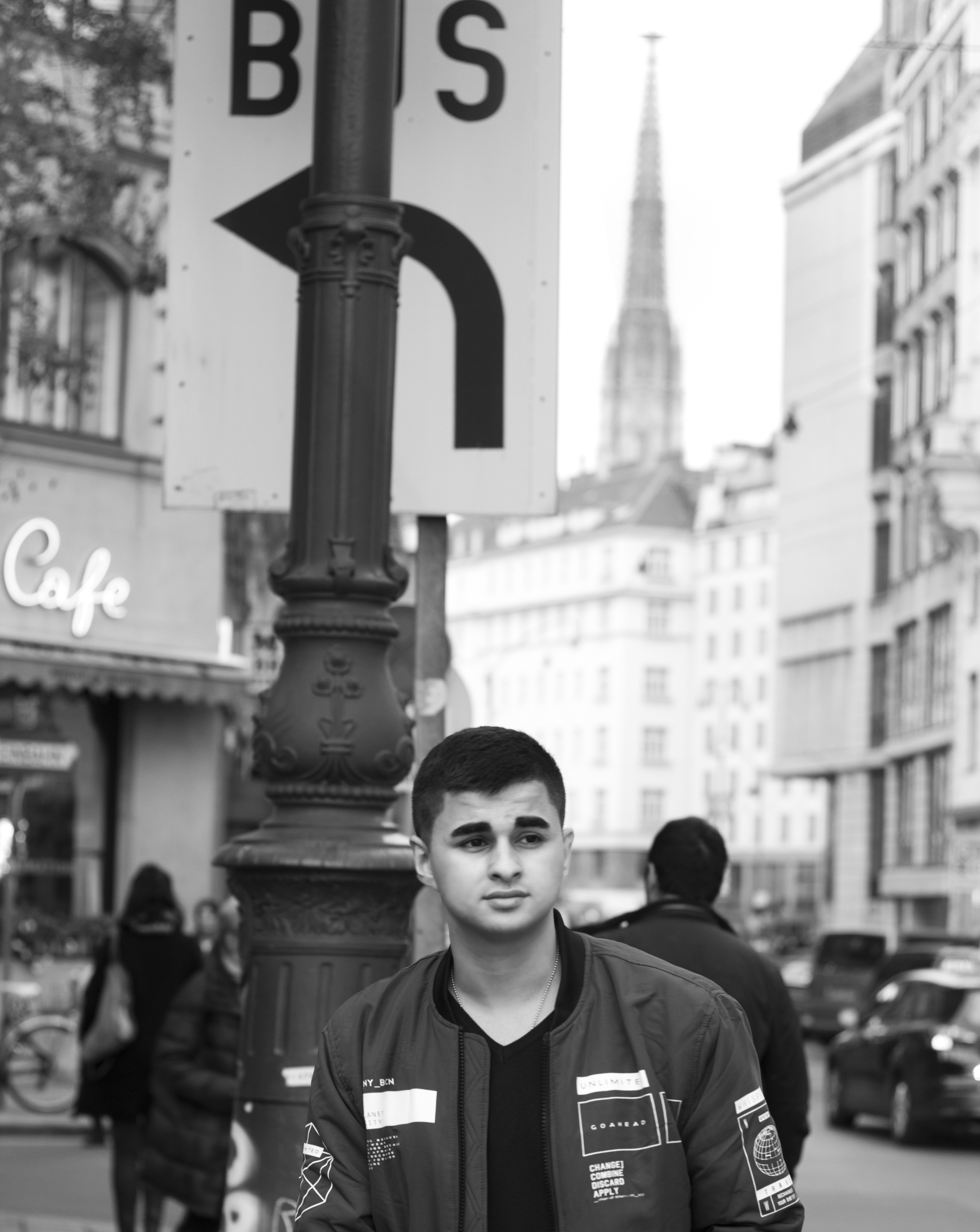
- Zeki Majed in Vienna.
- Born: Zeki Anwar Majed; 13 November 1996 (age 29); Sofia, Bulgaria
- Occupations: Filmmaker, poet

Zeki Majed (born 13 November 1996) is a Kurdish filmmaker and poet. He was born and raised in Sofia, Bulgaria.

== Biography ==
His first poem, Eyes Never Dry, won first prize at Pendle War Poetry Competition. He wrote multiple love poems praising women. A poem he wrote, Brave Woman, was read at St Margaret's, Westminster by Glenys Kinnock, Baroness Kinnock of Holyhead in memory of British MP Jo Cox.

== See also ==
- List of Kurdish scholars
