= Rojen Barnas =

Turkish minister

Rojen Barnas is the pen name of Mehmet Gemici (born 1945), a contemporary Kurdish poet and writer. He was born in the Diyarbakır region in south-eastern Turkey. He became active in Kurdish politics in the 1970s. He has made his home in Sweden since 1981. He started publishing a Kurdish magazine called Tîrêj in the 1970s where he wrote several works on Kurdish history. He has also published articles in other Kurdish journals such as Hêvî and Nûdem.

== Works ==
1. In the early dawn (Li bandeva spêde), Izmir, 1980.
2. The moon in the sky of Diyarbakir (Heyv li esmanê Diyarbekirê), 119 pp., 1984. ISBN 91-85242-69-1.
3. The kingdom of love (Milkê Evînê), 81 pp., Nûdem Publishers, Stockholm, 1995. ISBN 91-88592-14-6.
4. Then (Hingê), 83 pp., Nûdem Publishers, Stockholm, 1997. (short stories)

== See also ==
- List of Kurdish scholars
