= Zewar =

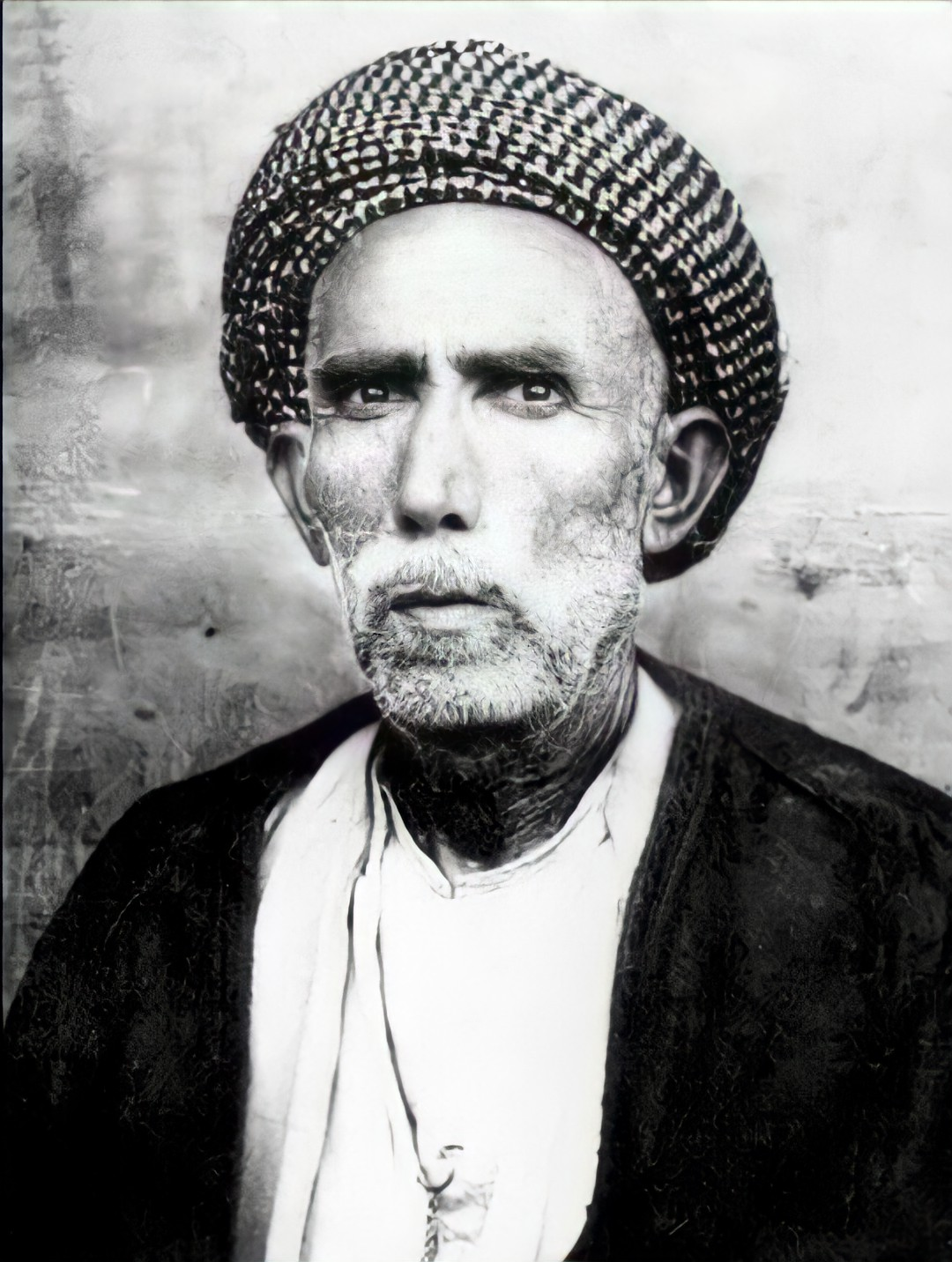
Zewar

Fayek Abdullah Muhhamadi Afandi Mala Rassul or Zewar, (زێوەر in Kurdish), (1875 – 10 November 1948), was a Kurdish poet and writer. Zewar was born in the Kaniskan neighborhood of Sulaimaniya city in Iraq.

== See also ==
- List of Kurdish scholars
