= Azad Zal =

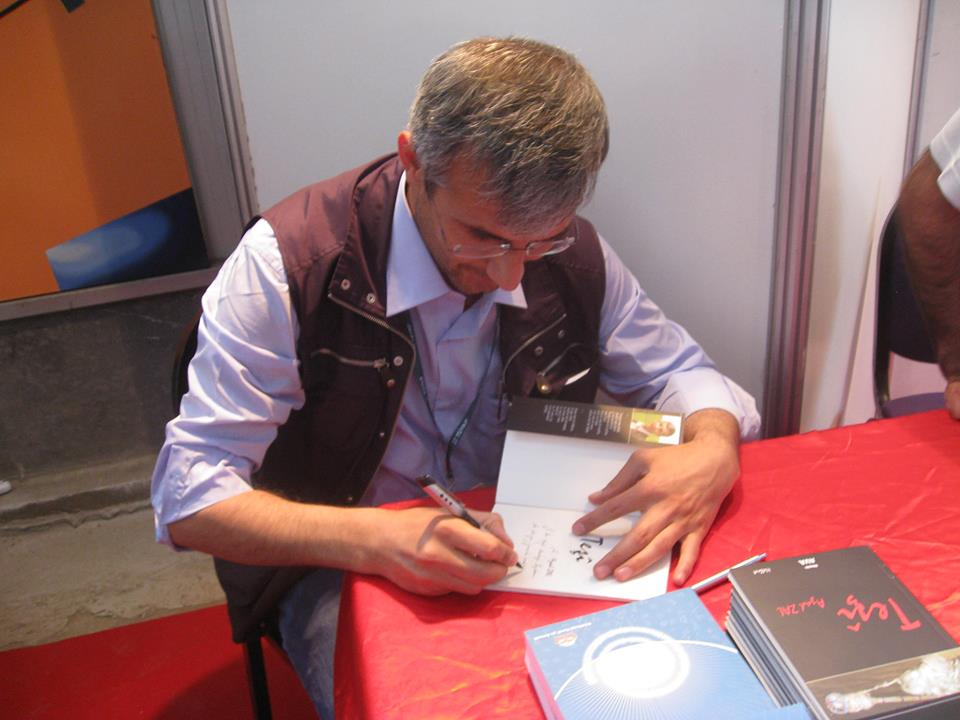

Azad Zal (1972, Diyarbakır) is a poet, writer, journalist, translator and linguist of Kurdish origin. He was born in 1972 in Sur district (Diyarbakır). He is the vice chairman of the Kurdish Writers' Association and he is section editor of the Kurdish Institute in Diyarbakır.

His first poems had published in 1990, he had been into prison for 12 years because of his political works. He was an editor of Azadiya Welat between 2005–2006 and at the same time he made editorial Kurdish works for History Academy of Middle East. He’s worked as a publisher at the Kurdish Instutie in Diyarbakır between 2006–2009, and he was an editor of Kurdish literary magazine “W” after Sîdar Jîr and Dilawer Zeraq. Since 2007 he serves as the vice president of the Kurdish Writers’ Association.

== Books ==
1. Teşî (Spindal), Weşanên AVA (AVA Publications), Amed, June 2009. ISBN 978-605-89-3420-7
2. Zimanê Kurdî (Kurdish Language), The Kurdish Institute of Amed, Amed September-2009. ISBN 978-605-60-7452-3
3. Sûzê û Hirç (Sûzê and Bear), Municipality Kayapınar Publications (Folk Tales), Amed 2009. ISBN 978-605-88-9724-3
4. Rêwî (Fare), Weşanên AVA (AVA Publications), Amed, October 2010. ISBN 978-605-88-4369-1

== See also ==
- List of Kurdish scholars
