= Mustafa Aydogan =

Kurdish writer and translator

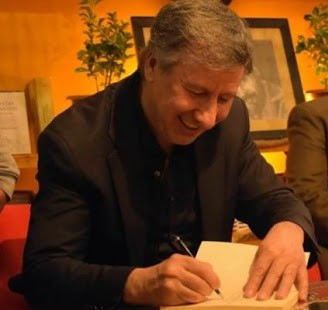
- Born: 1957 (age 68–69); Kızıltepe
- Occupations: Writer and translator

Mustafa Aydogan (born 1957) is a contemporary Kurdish writer and translator. He was born in the district of Kızıltepe in Mardin in southeastern Turkey and relocated to Sweden in 1985. He has translated works of renowned authors such as Jack London, Yaşar Kemal, Aziz Nesin and Orhan Pamuk into Kurdish.

== Books ==
1. Zaroka şevê, Translation of Children of the Frost by Jack London, 82 pp., Nûdem Publishers, Stockholm, 1995.
2. Pêlên bêrîkirinê (Novel), 171 pp., Nûdem Publishers, Stockholm, 1997, ISBN 91-88592-28-6, ISBN 978-91-88592-28-6.
3. Siltanê Fîlan, Translation of Filler Sultanı by Yaşar Kemal, 239 pp., Nûdem Publishers, Stockholm, 1998, ISBN 91-88592-36-7.
4. Fîl Hemdî, Translation of Fil Hamdi by Aziz Nesin, Doz Publishers, Istanbul, 1999.
5. Siwaro, Translation of a work by Edip Karahan, 63 pp., Nûdem Publishers, Stockholm, 2001, ISBN 91-88592-58-8.
6. Kurdistan : wêne, Translation of Kurdistan fotografier by Ann Eriksson, 172 pp., Almlöf Publishers, Stockholm, 2001, ISBN 91-88712-40-0.
7. Berê gotin hebû, Collection of articles, 207 pp., Doz Publishers, Istanbul, 2001, ISBN 975-6876-22-0, ISBN 978-975-6876-22-0.
8. Navê Min Sor e, Translation of Benim Adım Kırmızı by Orhan Pamuk, 586 pp., Nefel/Doz Publishers, Stockholm/Istanbul, 2002, ISBN 975-6876-23-9, ISBN 978-975-6876-23-7.
9. Ferhenga Swêdî-Kurdî (Kurmancî) (Swedish-Kurdish Dictionary), with Mahmûd Lewendî and Vîldan Tanrikulu, Published by Myndigheten för skolutveckling, Sweden, 1074 pp., 2006, ISBN 91-85589-14-4, ISBN 978-91-85589-14-2.

== See also ==
- List of Kurdish scholars
