= Firat Cewerî =

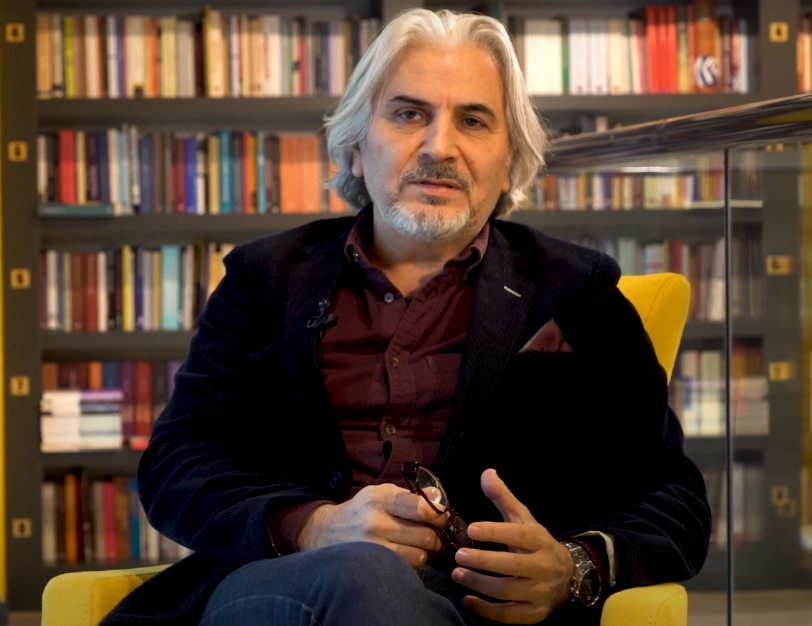
Firat Cewerî

Firat Cewerî is a Kurdish writer, translator and journalist. He was born in the town of Derik near Mardin in southeastern Turkey. In the 1980s, he emigrated to Sweden, where he lives now.

He started writing in Kurdish in the 1980s. He served as the editor of the Kurdish journal Nûdem for about 10 years. He has written more than ten books in Kurdish and translated literary works of John Steinbeck, Chekhov, Dostoevsky, Astrid Lindgren, Yaşar Kemal and Henning Mankell into Kurdish.

== Books ==
1. Mişk û Mirov - Translation of the novel: Of Mice and Men by John Steinbeck, Nûdem Publishers, 126 pp., ISBN 91-88592-01-4, 1993.
2. Şevên Spî, Translation of the novel: White Nights by Fyodor Dostoevsky, Nûdem Publishers, 79 pp., ISBN 91-88592-00-6, 1993.
3. Çexov: Bexçeyê vîsne : piyeseke çar perde, Translation of the Play: The Cherry Orchard by Anton Chekhov, Nûdem Publishers, 92 pp., ISBN 91-88592-07-3, 1995.
4. Gotinên Navdaran, Nûdem Publishers, 106 pp., 1995.
5. Girtî, Nûdem Publishers, 174 pp., 1996.
6. Kevoka Spî, Nûdem Publishers, 60 pp., 1996.
7. Kultur, Huner û Edebiyat, Nûdem Publishers, 423 pp., 1996.
8. Keça kurd zengê, Translation of a novel by Cemşid Bender, from Turkish, Nûdem Publishers, 127 pp., ISBN 91-88592-31-6, 1997.
9. Dara hinarê : roman, Translation of a novel by Yaşar Kemal, Nûdem Publishers, 117 pp., ISBN 91-88592-37-5, 1998.
10. Pêlên Derya Reş, Nûdem Publishers, 120 pp., 2000.
11. Emîl hê jî li Lönnebergayê dijî, Translation of a novel by Astrid Lindgren (Emil i Lönneberga), Nûdem Publishers, 163 pp., ISBN 91-88592-54-5, 2000.
12. Sûmiyên Emîl yên nû, Translation of a novel by Astrid Lindgren (Nya hyss av Emil i Lönneberga), Nûdem Publishers, 155 pp., ISBN 91-88592-51-0, 2000.
13. Hingura êvarê, Translation of a novel by Henning Mankell (Skuggorna växer i skymningen), Nûdem Publishers, 191 pp., ISBN 91-88592-65-0, 2002.
14. Alfonsê sûm li ku ye?, Translation of a short story by Gunilla Bergström (Var är bus-Alfons?), Nûdem Publishers, 27 pp., ISBN 91-88592-62-6.
15. Antolojiya çîrokên Kurd (Anthology of Kurdish stories), two volumes, Nûdem Publishers, 2003.
16. Payiza Dereng, Nûdem Publishers, 407 pp., 2005.
17. Il matto, la Prostituta e lo Scrittore - Versione italiana (Calamaro Edizioni) 2022.

== See also ==
- List of Kurdish scholars
