= Cankurd =

Kurdish poet and writer

Cankurd (born 1948 in Maydan) is a contemporary Kurdish poet and writer.

== Biography ==
Born 1948 in the village of Maydan in northwestern Syria, he completed his studies in Afrin and Aleppo. Due to his political activism, he was imprisoned several times, until he left Syria for Germany in 1979. He writes in Kurdish, Arabic and German. He has translated some of the literary works of Shakespeare and Daphne du Maurier into Kurdish. He has also translated some poets of the contemporary Arab poet Nizar Qabbani into Kurdish.

== Books ==
1. Gundê Dîna, Short story in Kurdish, Helwest Publishers, Sweden, ISBN 91-89224-09-4/9189224094.
2. Selahdînê Eyûbî: Kurdekî Cîhan Hejand, Helwest-Çanda Nûjen Publishers, Spånga, Sweden, 60 pp., 2000. ISBN 91-89224-05-1/9189224051.
3. Alexander Jaba (Berhevoka çêrokên kurmancî), First edition, Helwest Publishers, Spånga, 135 pp., 2000.
4. Dilopeka xwîna dila, Poem.
5. Bazirganê Vênîsiya, Translation of The Merchant of Venice by Shakespeare.

== See also ==
- List of Kurdish scholars
