= Kendal Nezan =

French-Kurdish nuclear physicist

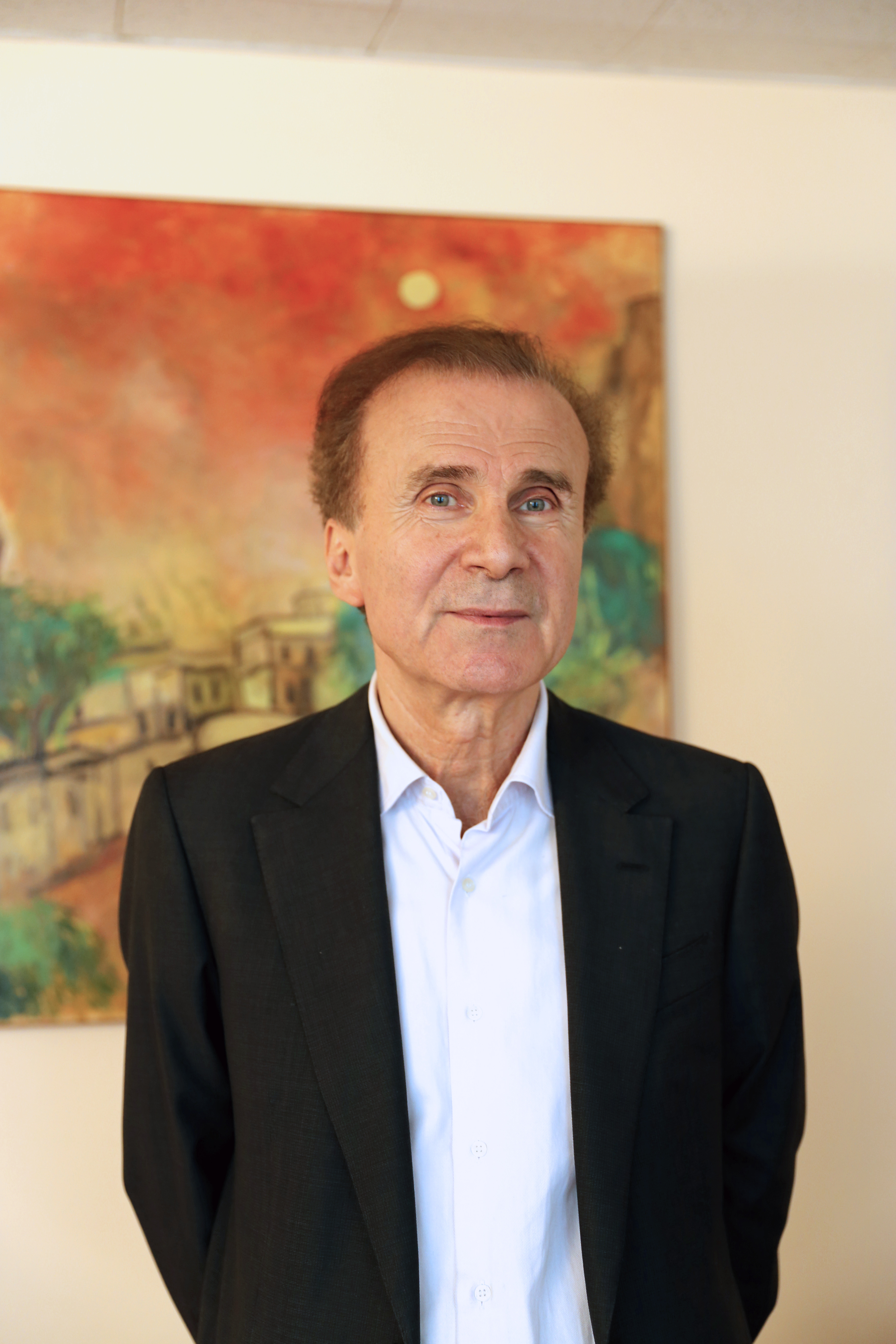
Kendal Nezan (2014)

Kendal Nezan is a French-Kurdish nuclear physicist and president of the Kurdish Institute of Paris. He was born in Turkey. He is also a board member of the Washington Kurdish Institute.

In 1975, Nezan established the France-Kurdistan Society, which included the leading French intellectual Jean-Paul Sartre.

Nezan maintains close relations with numerous European governments and the European Parliament.

== Biography ==
After completing high school at the Diyarbakır High School and two years of medical school in Ankara, he came to France to study nuclear physics. He earned his master’s degree at the Paris-Sud University and obtained a DEA (Diplôme d’Études Approfondies) in reactor physics at the Institute of Nuclear Sciences and Technology in Saclay. His doctoral dissertation focused on particle physics. He worked as a researcher at the CNRS and the Collège de France.

Alongside his studies and professional activities, Kendal Nezan was committed to defending the Kurdish cause. As a student, he founded the Union of Kurdish Students in France, then the Mala Kurdan (House of the Kurds), and published magazines in the Kurdish language, such as Ronahî (Clarity) and Azadî (Freedom). In 1974, along with several French intellectuals (Jean-Paul Sartre,Simone de Beauvoir, Maxime Rodinson, Pierre Vidal-Naquet, Edgar Morin, Bernard Dorin, and Gérard Chaliand), he helped found the France-Kurdistan Association. Through its publications and media appearances, this association played a pioneering role in raising awareness of the Kurdish cause in France.

In February 1983, along with a dozen Kurdish intellectuals and artists in exile—including filmmaker Yılmaz Güney, winner of the Palme d'Or at the 1982 Cannes Film Festival—he founded the Kurdish Institute of Paris, which became a recognized public-interest foundation in March 1993.

Under Michel Rocard government, he became a member of the National Council for Regional and Minority Languages, chaired by the Prime Minister.

In 2008, he founded and ran for five years a Kurdish-language cultural television channel, KURD1, which broadcast from Paris via satellite to the Kurdish diaspora and Kurdistan.

In 1978, together with A.-R. Ghassemlou, Ismet Cheriff Vanly, and Gérard Chaliand, he edited the first reference work on the history and situation of Kurdistan, The Kurds and Kurdistan, published by Maspero. The book was translated into about ten languages, including English and German, and was reprinted several times.

== See also ==
- Kurmanji
