= Hesenê Metê =

Kurdish writer and translator

Hesenê Metê (born 1957) is a prominent Kurdish writer, novelist and translator. He was born in Erxanî near Diyarbakır in southeastern Turkey. He has been living in Sweden since the 1980s. He has translated works by Pushkin and Dostoyevski into Kurdish.

== Works ==
1. Merivên reben, Translation of Poor Folk by Dostoyevski, 185 pp., Welat Publishers, 1991. ISBN 91-971254-8-2.
2. Smîrnoff, Story, 95 pp., Welat Publishers, Stockholm, 1991. ISBN 91-971254-1-5.
3. Ardû, çîrokên gelêrî, 173 pp., Welat Publishers, Stockholm, 1991. ISBN 91-971254-4-X.
4. Labîrenta cinan, Novel, 197 pp., Welat Publishers, Huddinge, Sweden, 1994. ISBN 91-971254-7-4.
5. Epîlog, Story, 141 pp., Nûdem Publishers, Järfälla, Sweden, 1998. ISBN 91-88592-35-9.
6. Keça Kapîtan, Translation of The Captain's Daughter by Pushkin, 1998.
7. Tofan, Story, 88 pp., Apec Publishers, Spånga, Sweden, 2000. ISBN 91-89014-76-6.
8. Ansîklopediya Zarokan (Children's Encyclopaedia), with Amed Tigris, Mehmud Lewendi, Seyidxan Anter, Ali Ciftci, 236 pp., Apec Publishers, Sweden, 2004. ISBN 91-89675-32-0.
9. Gotinên gunehkar, Novel, 151 pp., Avesta Publishers, Istanbul, Turkey, 2007. ISBN 978-9944-382-33-5.
10. Li dêrê, novel, 102 pp., Nûdem Publishers, Istanbul, Turkey, 2011. ISBN 978-60587811-1-5.
11. Pêsîrên dayê, Story, 130 pp., Apec Publishers, Spånga, Sweden, 2013. ISBN 978-91-86139-74-2.
12. Îşev û çîroka dawîn, Story, 90 pp., Peywend Publishers, Istanbul, Turkey, 2014. ISBN 978-60585387-7-1
13. Hefsar, novel, 94 pp., Peywend Publishers, Istanbul, Turkey, 2018. ISBN 978-60581608-2-8

== See also ==
- List of Kurdish scholars
