= Mehmed Uzun =

Kurdish Writer (1953–2007)

- Born: January 1, 1953; Siverek, Şanlıurfa Province, Turkey
- Died: October 11, 2007 (aged 54); Diyarbakir, Turkey
- Occupations: Writer and novelist

Mehmed Uzun (January 1, 1953 – October 11, 2007) was a Kurdish writer and novelist born in Siverek, Şanlıurfa Province, Turkey. Though the Kurdish language was outlawed in Turkey from 1920 to 1990, he started to write in it and achieved much toward shaping a modern Kurdish literary language and reviving the Kurdish tradition of storytelling. In 1977–2005 he lived in exile in Sweden as a political refugee, becoming a prolific writer, author of a dozen Kurdish-language novels and essays, which made him a founding member of Kurdish literature in Kurmanji dialect. In June 2005 he returned to Istanbul. He was a member of the PEN club and the Swedish writers association. On May 29, 2006, he was found to have stomach cancer. After treatment at the Karolinska University Hospital in Stockholm, he returned to Diyarbakir, Turkey, where he died, aged 54.

== Works ==
He published seven novels in Kurdish. Uzun published his first attempt at a modern Kurdish novel in 1985, Tu (You). After that he edited an anthology of Kurdish literature, the first of its kind. Critical success came with his novel "In the Shadow of a Lost Love" (Siya Evînê). The story fictionalizes a 1920s Kurdish intellectual's failed struggle to pursue both his love for a woman and his duty to fight the newly formed Turkish republic.

His novels began to be translated into European languages in the 1990s. Two of his books have been published in Swedish: a collection of essays, Granatäppelblomning (The Pomegranate Flowers), and the novel I skuggan av en förlorad kärlek (In the Shadow of a Lost Love). In collaboration with Madeleine Grive, he has also published an international anthology, Världen i Sverige (The World in Sweden), a pioneering anthology of texts by writers who were not born in Sweden, but who are living and writing there. He also published in the journal of the Kurdish Institute of Paris, Kurmancî. He won the Torgny Segerstedt Award for 2001 for his work in a narrative tradition.

== Conflict with the Turkish state ==
Mehmed Uzun was charged several times in Turkey due to his activities in the field of Kurdish literature . He was arrested on March 21, 1976 as managing editor of a Kurdish-Turkish magazine, and was accused of "separatism" and jailed in Ankara's central prison. During his trial in the summer of 1976, he attempted to prove the existence of the Kurds and the Kurdish language. The prosecutor's argument was that the Kurds and their language had no form of existence. Anyone claiming the opposite was considered a separatist and deserved to be punished. He was sentenced to eight months in prison. After release, he was still under the threat of indictment on account of his responsibilities as editor of the aforementioned magazine, and consequently he chose exile and left for Sweden in 1977. The regulations prevailing in Turkey at the time made return to his native country impossible.

Subsequently, in 1981, by decision of the military regime and like many other Turkish and Kurdish intellectuals, he was stripped of his nationality. He resumed his linguistic quest in Stockholm, aided by grants from the Swedish government. To collect vocabulary and folklore, he visited an Iraqi Kurdish leader in a rebel-held mountain valley of Iraq, spending evenings in a tent listening to Kurdish poets and storytellers by the light of an oil lamp. He learned Arabic script to read classical Kurdish poems of the 16th and 17th centuries. Later, he hunted down rare copies of a magazine published by Kurdish exiles in the 1920s. The ill-fated adventures of these pioneers form the backbone of two of his novels, which, like all of his fiction, detail the struggles of Kurds through the ages. He also led an editorial board of intellectuals, who would pay for Kurds to fly to Europe to brief them on obscure vocabulary.

When after many years of living in exile, he went back to Turkey to give a speech about Kurdish literature, seven of his books, six in Kurdish and one in Turkish, were suppressed by Judgment no. 2000/39 of the Fourth Court for State Security of Diyarbakır, dated February 4, 2000.

== Books ==
1. Tu (You), Novel, 1985.
2. Mirina Kalekî Rind (Death of a Nice Old Man), Novel, 1987.
3. Siya Evînê (Shadow of Love), Novel, 1989. Translated into Swedish as "I skuggan av en förlorad kärlek", Översättning av Ingmar Björkstén, Ordfront förlag, 241 s., Stockholm, 2001, ISBN 91-7324-716-2, Pris: 303 SEK
4. Ji Rojên Evdalê Zeynikê (From the days of Evdal Zeynikê), Novel, 1991.
5. Destpêka Edebiyata Kurdî (The Beginning of Kurdish Literature], Research, 1992.
6. Mirina Egîdekî (Death of a Hero), Poetry, 1993.
7. Hêz û Bedewiya Pênûsê (The Strength and Beauty of the Pen), Essays, Nudem Publishers, 203p., 1993.
8. Bîra Qederê : Roman (Memory of Destiny: A Novel), Istanbul, Avesta Publishers, 1995, 260 p. (Re-published by Nefel, Sweden, 2002, ISBN 91-89687-11-6).
9. Världen i Sverige (Anthology, in Swedish)
10. Dinya Li Swêdê (The World in Sweden), same anthology, in Kurdish, with Madliene Grive, 1995.
11. Antolojiya Edebiyata Kurdî (Anthology of Kurdish Literature] (anthology, 2 vols., 1995).
12. Ronî Mîna Evînê Tarî Mîna Mirinê (Light like Love, Dark like Death), Novel, Avesta Publishers, 350 p., 1998.
13. Hawara Dîcleyê I, Novel, Nefel Publishers, Sweden, 230 pp., 2003, ISBN 91-89687-13-2.

== See also ==
- List of Kurdish scholars

== Articles ==
1. Mehmed Uzun, "Words Washed by the Waters of the Euphrates", International Journal of Kurdish Studies, Vol.14, No. 1&2, pp. 36–40, 2000.
2. Mehmed Uzun,, The Journal of the International Parliament of Writers, Vol. 1, Jan. 2001, pp. 67–78.
3. Mehmed Uzun, The Nature of Fiction, Index on Censorship Journal, vol.4, 2001.
4. Uzun, Mehmed (January 2003). "Diyarbakir: the slap in the face". International Journal of Kurdish Studies. Archived from the original on October 24, 2009 – via FindArticles.
