= Perwîz Cîhanî =

Kurdish writer and novelist

Parwiz Cihani
- Perwîz Cîhanî
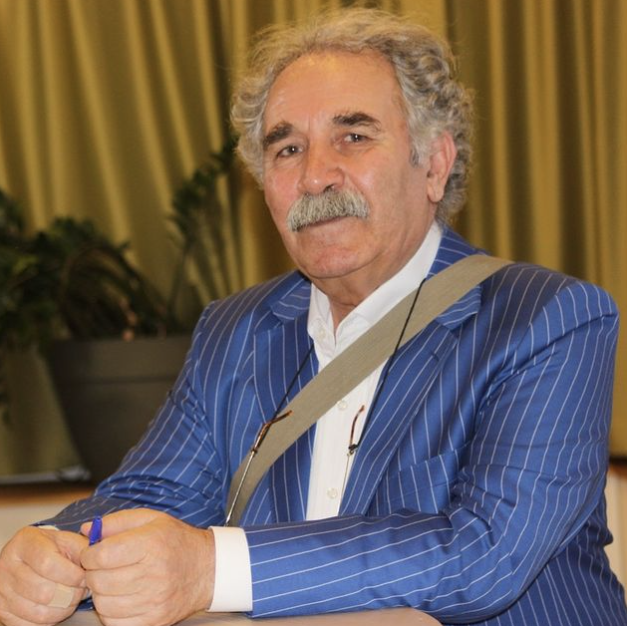
- Born: January 1, 1955 (age 71); Khoy, Iran
- Occupation: Writer
- Years active: 1990–present

Parwiz Cihani (Perwîz Cîhanî, Kurdish) (born 1955), is a Kurdish writer and novelist. He was born near Khoy in northwest of Iran. Around 1977–1978, he began writing poems and short stories in Kurdish, and collecting pieces of Kurdish folklore. In 1984, he worked in the Kurdish Radio of Urmia, presenting two cultural programs. During the same period, he was active in the Kurdish journal of Sirwe, where he published several articles. In 1986, due to the content of his radio programs, he was dismissed from his job in radio. He continued working full-time in Sirwe until he was forced to leave Iran and sought refuge in Switzerland as a political asylum in 1995. He has worked with several online Kurdish journals such as Mehname, Avesta and Nûdem.

== Modern Kurdish Literature (Xelata Şerefnameyê) - Award ==
In recognition of his outstanding contributions to Kurdish language and culture, Perwîz Cîhanî was awarded the prestigious "Xelata Şerefnameyê ya Çand û Zimanê Kurdî" (Şerefname Award for Kurdish Culture and Language). This honor is given to individuals who have made significant efforts to preserve and promote the Kurdish language, arts, and heritage. Cîhanî's work, which often centers around Kurdish identity and the struggles for cultural preservation, made him a deserving recipient of this award. His dedication to elevating Kurdish literature and his commitment to using language as a tool for resistance and expression have cemented his place among the most influential figures in Kurdish cultural life.

== Works ==
1. Bilîcan. Novel, 512pp., Doz Publishers, Istanbul, 2002, ISBN 975-6876-29-8 . Re-published by Nefel Publishers, Sweden, 2002 . ISBN 91-89687-12-4.
2. Ax Şilêrok (Collection of Poems), 64 pp., Apec Publishers, Spanga, Sweden, 1998. ISBN 91-89014-30-8.
3. Peyam: Komele Kurteçîrok (Collection of Short Stories), 126 pp., Orient-Réalités, Genève, 1997.
4. Li Ser Wergera M. Emîn Bozarslan a Mem û Zîna Ehmedê Xanî (Regarding Emîn Bozarslan's transliteration of Mem û Zîn of Ahmad Khani), Zend Journal, Kurdish Institute of Istanbul, No.8 .
5. Rênivîsa Kurdî (Kurdish Grammar), Salahaddin Ayoobi Publishers, Urmia, Iran.

== See also ==
- List of Kurdish scholars
