= Muhammad Amin Zaki =

24th President of the Chamber of Deputies of Hashemite Iraq

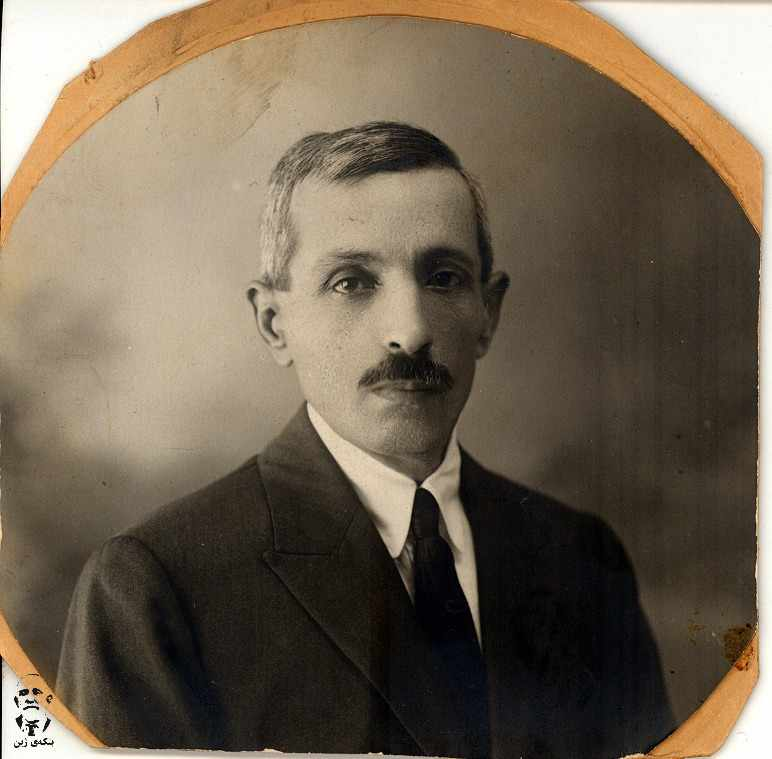
- Born: 1880; Sulaymaniyah, Ottoman Empire
- Died: 1948 (aged 67–68); Sulaymaniyah, Kingdom of Iraq
- Occupations: Historian, Politician, writer
- Writing career
- Subjects: Politics, Social issues, History
- Notable works: Kurds and Kurdistan
- Literary movement: Kurdish Nationalism

Muhammad Amin Zaki Bey, (1880 Sulaymaniyah –1948 Sulaymaniyah), was a Kurdish writer, historian and politician. He was born in Sulaimaniya, son of Hagi Abdul Rahman. After studying in Sulaimaniya Military School and Baghdad Military High School, on 10 February 1902, he graduated from the Ottoman Military Academy (P. 1317–23) as the 23rd of the class and joined the Ottoman Army as Infantry Second Lieutenant (Mülâzım-ı Sani ). He graduated from the Ottoman Military College (Staff College) at Istanbul as distinguished officer (Mümtaz subayı ) on 11 January 1905. And then he served as a staff officer (major) in the Ottoman Army. He left his last duty at the Military history department on 23 July 1923 for Baghdad, and started to give lecture at the Iraqi Military Academy. He also served in the Iraqi administration under the British mandate in the 1920s and was appointed as Defence Minister in 1928. His two-volume book on history of the Kurdish people and states is one of the acclaimed works on this subject and has been translated into several languages including Arabic and English. He was the president of the Chamber of Deputies from December 1944 to June 1946. He died in Sulaimaniyah in July 1948.

== Books ==
His books were in Kurdish, Arabic and Turkish. His works primarily focused on Kurdish history, and include:

1. A Short History of the Kurds and Kurdistan, in two volumes, Dar al-Islami Publishers, Baghdad, 1931. (in Kurdish: Tarîxî Kurd û Kurdistan, Kurmancî: Dîroka Kurd û Kurdistanê ) Vol.I: From the Antiquity to the Present., Vol.II: History of the Kurdish States and Principalities.
2. Meşahirî Kurd
3. Tarîxî Silêmani

== Political life ==
Zeki was MP of Sulaymaniyah on a number of occasions. He also served as a minister in different portfolios:

- Transport minister (1925-1927)
- Education minister (1927-1928)
- Defence minister (1929)
- Economics and finance minister (1931)

== See also ==
- List of Kurdish philosophers
- List of Kurdish scholars
