= Nuri Sheikh Salih Sheikh Ghani Barzinji =

Iraqi Kurdish newspaper editor, activist, and poet

Nuri Sheikh Salih Sheikh Ghani Sheikh Abdul Qadir (Kurdish: شێخ نوری شێخ ساڵح, romanized: Şêx Nûrî Şêx Salih) was an Ottoman Kurdish newspaper editor, activist, and poet. He was from the Barzanji tribe of Kurdistan.

Nuri was born in the Sulaimaniyah neighbourhood of Ashaba Spi in 1896. Nuri was related to the last Kurdish King, Mahmud Barzanji. From a young age, Nuri partook in Kurdish activism and had a love for poetry, he was inspired by his love for his country, family and friends. Nuri has authored a number of poetry books, one being Diwani Sheikh Nuri Sheikh Salih published first in the 1970s.

== Positions held ==
Under Mahmud Barzanji's reign, Nuri was the Persian Editor of the Bangi Kurdistan newspaper and the Editor in Chief of the Roji Kurdistan newspaper. Nuri held many government posts including the district administrator of Sangaw and Rawanduz Kurdistan.

== Children ==
He had several notable children. His eldest son was Janab. His second eldest was Shahab Sheikh Nuri, the founder of the Komalay Ranjdarani Kurdistan. Khala Shahab was executed by the Baathist regime under the direct order of the then Iraqi Vice President Saddam Hussein on November 21, 1976 in the Abu Ghraib prison. His third son was Nihad, who died during the 1991 Kurdish exodus on the Iraq/Iran border and was buried in the Kurdish village of Kani Dinar. The fourth son was Daro, who held many positions within the Patriotic Union of Kurdistan (PUK). At one point Daro was a member of the PUK Politburo and in the late 1990s was the Deputy Prime Minister for the Kurdistan Regional Government. Nuri's two daughters are Galawezh and Pirshang. Pirshing is the only one of Nuri's offspring still alive.

== See also ==
- List of Kurdish scholars
