= Abdulla Pashew =

Kurdish famous poet

Abdullah Pashew
- عەبدوڵڵا پەشێو
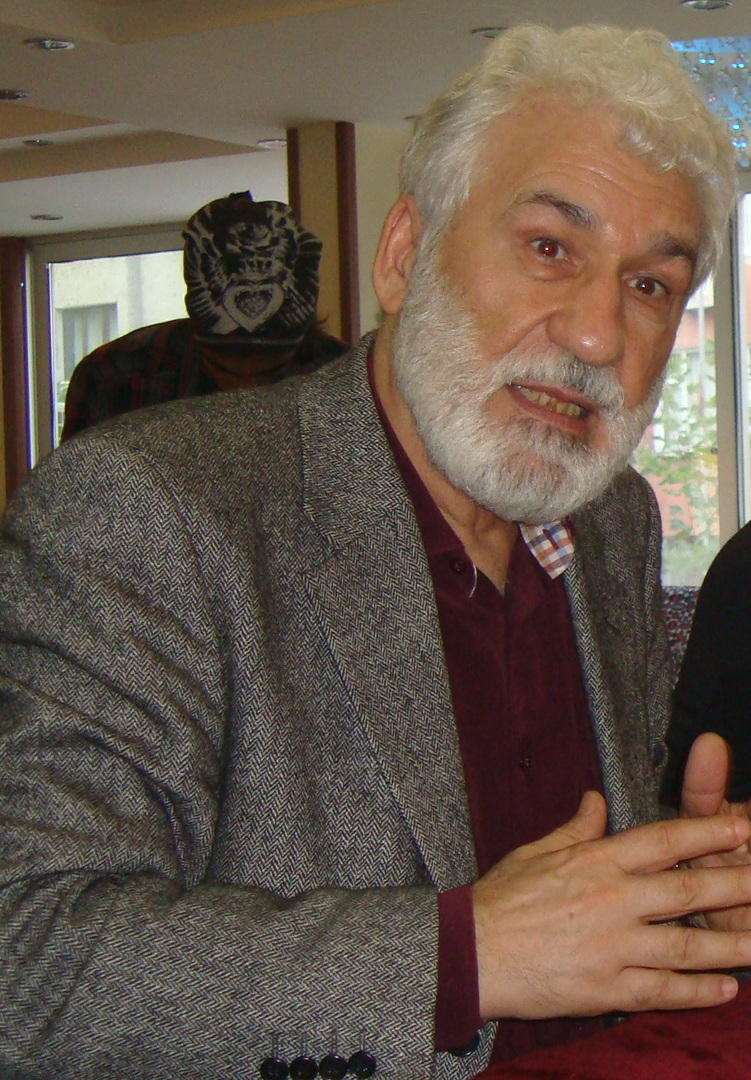
- Born: 1946 (age 79–80); Erbil, Iraqi Kurdistan, Berkot neighborhood
- Occupations: poet Author Translator
- Writing career
- Language: Kurdish; Arabic; Russian; German; English; Finnish; Persian
- Website: pashew.com

Abdulla Pashew (Kurdish: عەبدوڵا پەشێو, romanized: Ebdulla Peşêw) is a Kurdish poet. He was born in 1946 in Hewlêr, southern Kurdistan. He studied at the Teachers' Training Institute in Hewlêr (Erbil), and participated in the Foundation Congress of the Kurdish Writers' Union in Baghdad in 1970. In 1973 he went to the former Soviet Union, and in 1979 he received an M.A. in pedagogy with a specialisation in foreign languages. In 1984 he was granted a PhD in Philology from the Institute of Oriental Studies of the USSR Academy of Sciences. For the next five years he was a professor at al-Fatih University in Tripoli, Libya. He has lived in Finland since 1995. He was a refugee until 1997.

He published his first poem in 1963 and his first collection in 1967. Since then he has published ten collections. The latest, Sawlm Pola u Kanarish dur (My Oars are Iron, yet the Shore is Far), was published in 2019 in Kurdistan. He is fluent in English and Russian and has translated the works of Walt Whitman and Alexandr Pushkin into Kurdish.

== See also ==
- List of Kurdish scholars
