= Fakhr al-Din al-Akhlati =

Kurdish Muslim astronomer

- فخر الدين الأخلاتي
- Born: fl. c. 1260

Academic work
- Era: Islamic Golden Age
- Main interests: Astronomy

Fakhr al-Din al-Akhlati (Kurdish: Fexredînê Exlatî, Fakhr al-Din al-Kurdi al-Akhlati; Arabic: فخر الدين الأخلاتي; flourished c. 1260), was a Kurdish and Islamic astronomer from Anatolia, who worked at the Maragha observatory. He was one of the first elites that the Persian polymath Nasir al-Din al-Tusi recruited to work in there. Al-Akhlati's life was in a period contemporaneous with the fall of Baghdad at the hands of the Mongols in 1258.

== Sources ==
- Micheau, François (1996). "The Scientific Institutions in the Medieval Near East". In Rashed, Roshdi (ed.). Encyclopedia of the History of Arabic Science: Technology, Alchemy and Life Sciences. Vol. 3. Routledge. ISBN 978-04151-2-412-6.
