= Faryad Shiri =

Iranian kurdish poet (born 1971)

Faryad Poet (: فەریاد شیری) is a contemporary Iranian Kurdish poet, critic, writer and translator. He works on Kurdish and Persian literature. Faryad was born in Sahneh in 1971. He has published more than twenty works consisting of his poems, translations and stories. He also has received several awards such as the Iran poetry prize (2002).

== Translations ==
- Passport of smile and wish (translation of modern Kurdish poetry), Mina, 2002.
- Love songs of chestnuts lands (translation of modern love songs of Kurdish poetry), Meshki, 2009
- A lady whispered Love, Markaz, 2008
- 100 Sia Cahamana (Horami poetry), Meshki, 2007

== Writings ==
- Crows don’t understand sparrows (poetry collection) Dastan Publishing house, 1998.
- My hug is full of journey (poetry collection), Nimnegah, 2003.
- Black people, white people, Negima, 2003.
- Crazy reading of rain (poetry collection in Kurdish language), Shola, 2005.
- Kalamatarh, Morvarid, 2010
- This name needs a new signature, Morvarid, 2010.
- We were lost in the picture on the rain" (story-photo collection), Negima, 2000.
- Homeland is not for sale (poetry collection), Negah, 2012.
- I am lonelier than moon (poetry collection of Kurdish language), Dastan publishing house, 2012.
