= Tirkamir Azadbakht =

19th century Kurdish poet

Tirkamir Azadbakht (Kurdish: ترکەمیر ئازادبەخت, Tirkemîr Azadbext; Persian: ترکه‌میر آزادبخت) was a Kurdish poet from Qajar Iran. He lived in the 19th century and was a pioneer of Laki poetry.

== Biography ==
According to Hejjat Rashidi, there was little information about the early life of Tirkamir and nothing about the date or place of his birth, but he was likely from one of the villages of the Azadbakht tribe of Laks in the Kuhdasht district of Lorestan province. He would make visits to Kermanshah, and died around 1820. Another study estimated that Tirkamir Azadbakht was born around 1747 and died around 1820. Mustafa Dehqan suggested that Tirkamir Azadbakht died around 1815. Muhyiddin Salehi wrote that Tirkamir was born in Delfan and that his tomb was in Qomesh, and that he was from the Azadbakht tribe, despite some claims that he was from the Mumavand tribe.

Tirkamir Azadbakht was a pioneer of Laki poetry and a student of Najaf Kalhuri, and they were known together as "Najaf and Tirkamir", with their poetry often including their long descriptive dialogue. Tirkamir was the mentor of the Laki poet Mohammad Taqi Mumavand, who was greatly affected by his death. Some suggested that Tirkamir promoted Yarsani beliefs in his poetry.

Popular lines from the poems of Tirkamir included "haftād ū do dīn žay parvarešt dar, har yak wa nahvī āw ū xwarešt dar" ("You have nurtured seventy-two religions, and You provide sustenance to each of them in Your own way."), "hām dīwān ža min sarfān nemaward, ya gešt ke wīyard parī dāx ū dard" ("My fellow poets were unable to outpace me, but all of that has passed and only sorrow remains.") and "torkamīr na tork na araw-lafzem, kurd-e kam-sawād hafez-ol-hefzam." ("I am Tirkamir, neither a Turk nor an Arab-speaker, I am a semi-literate Kurd, yet I've memorized the tradition [Quran]".)
