= Riza Talabani =

Kurdish poet

Sheikh Riza Talabani (Raza) شێخ ڕەزای تاڵەبانی
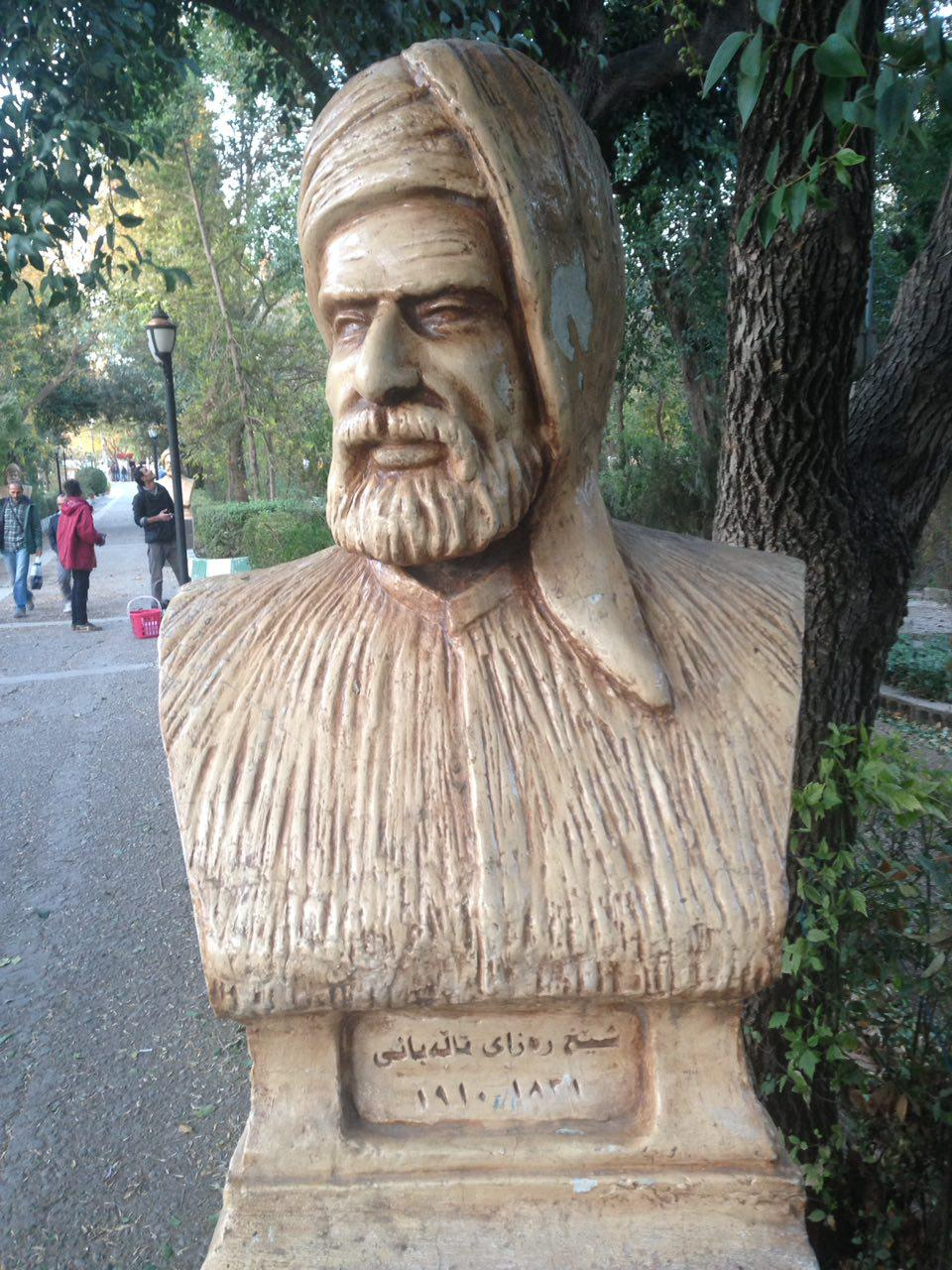
- A statue of Sheikh Riza Talabani, in Sulaymaniyah (Iraq)
- Born: 1835; Kirkuk, Ottoman Empire
- Died: 1910 (aged 74–75); Sulaymaniyah, Ottoman Empire
- Occupation: Poet
- Writing career
- Pen name: Riza Talabani
- Period: (1835–1910)
- Genres: Satire, Ribaldry, Flyting and Creative Insults

Sheikh Riza Talabani (Kurdish: شێخ ڕەزای تاڵەبانی, romanized: Şêx Rizayê Talebanî) was a Kurdish poet from Kirkuk. Talabani wrote his poetry in Kurdish, Persian, and Arabic. Most of his poetry consists of Satire, Ribaldry, Flyting and creative insults.

The poet in one of his famous poems recalled his childhood in the Kurdish Emirate of Baban before it was ruled by the Persians or the Ottomans.

As a young man of age twenty-five or so, the poet went to the Ottoman capital, Constantinople (Istanbul). In the course of his journey, he visited the grave of the Kurdish Sufi, Sheikh Nurredin Brifkani. At the graveside he recited a long poem in Persian, telling of how he had journeyed from the Emirate of Sharazur to visit The Country of the Rom. In 1879, when the Ottoman Empire annexed the Wilayah of Sharazur to the Wilayah of Mosul, Riza expressed his sadness and disappointment in a poem, in Turkish, in which he told the people that Mosul had now become the capital of their Wilayah and Nafi’i Effendi was the Wali.

Riza Talabani is one of the foremost Kurdish poets. To date, seven editions of his poetry have been published: in Baghdad in 1935 and 1946, in Iran, in Sweden in 1996, in As Sulaymaniyah in 1999 and, most recently, in Arbil in 2000.

== See also ==
- Kurdish literature
- List of Kurds
- List of Kurdish philosophers
- List of Kurdish scholars
- Kurdish language
