= Alaaddin Sajadi =

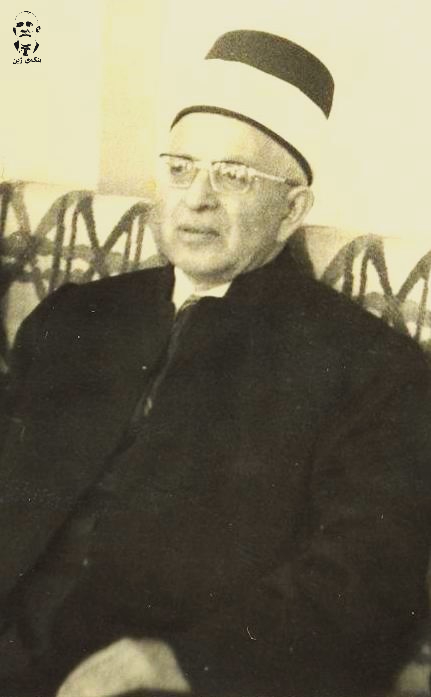
Alaaddin Sajadi

Alaaddin Sajjadi (1907–1984) (Sorani Kurdish: عەلائەددین سەججادی) was a Kurdish writer, poet and academic. He was born in Iraqi Kurdistan. He finished his religious studies and became a cleric in 1938. He began working in the field of journalism in 1939, and became the Editor-in-Chief of the Kurdish journal Gelawêj in 1941. In 1948, he published a journal in Kurdish and Arabic named Nizar. From 1958–1974, he taught Kurdish literature and history of Kurdish literature at Baghdad University.

== Works ==
1. Riştey Mirwarî (A Necklace Of Pearls), Collection of writings, 1957.
2. Mêjûyî Edebiyatî Kurdî (The history of Kurdish Literature), 1952.
3. Şorişî Kurdan û Şorişî Êraq (The Kurdish revolution and the Iraqi revolution).
4. Hemîşe Behar (Always Spring) Short story, 1960.
5. Destûr û ferhengî zimanî kurdî (Grammar and Dictionary of the Kurdish Language), 1961.
6. Edebî kurdî û lêkolînî edebî kurdî (Analysis of the Kurdish Literature), 1986.
7. Kurdewarî, 1974.
8. Deqekanê edebî kurdî (Kurdish Literature Texts), 1978.
9. Nawî Kurdî (Kurdish Names), Ma'arif Press, Baghdad, 1953.
10. Geştêk le Kurdistan (A Journey in Kurdistan).
11. Nirx Şinasî.

== See also ==
- List of Kurdish scholars
