= Karim Hisami =

Iranian Kurdish writer

Karim Hisami or Kerîmî Hisamî, (1926–2001) was an Iranian-Kurdish writer. He was born in the village of Beyrem near Mahabad. His real name was Karimi Mirza Hamed. Karim Hisami was his pen-name. At early age, he became involved in politics, and was registered as the 18th member of Komeley Jiyanewey Kurd party. He was a member of political bureau of Kurdistan Democratic Party of Iran until 1984. He lived most of his life in exile. In 1958, he fled to Iraq. In 1960, he moved to Czechoslovakia, where he studied in university. In the 1970s, he was working in Radio Peyk Iran (Radio Iranian Messenger) in Bulgaria. He went back to Iran in 1978 after the revolution. In 1985 he moved to Sweden, where he stayed until his death on October 6, 2001. In Sweden, he published a Kurdish journal titled Serdemî Nwê from 1986 to 1990. He was also closely affiliated with the Iraqi Communist Party. He is famous for his memoires, titled Le Bîreweriyekanim (From my memoires). He published eleven volumes of his massive memoires, between 1986 and 2001. This work is an important source for the study of Kurdish political movements in Iran. He has also translated literary works of Maxim Gorky, Ignazio Silone and Nikos Kazantzakis into Kurdish.

== Publications ==
- Karwanêk le şehîdanî Kurdistanî Êran (The martyrs of the Iranian Kurdistan), 1971
- Pêdaçûnewe (Review), Mardin Publishers, Sweden. ISBN 91-88880-23-0 / 9188880230
- Le Bîreweriyekanim (From my memoires), Vol. I, 316 pp., Jîna Nû Publishers, Uppsala, Sweden, 1986. ISBN 91-970747-1-3
- Komarî Dêmokratî Kurdistan yan Xudmuxtarî (The Kurdistan Democratic Republic or Autonomy), 112 pp., Azad Publishers, Sverige, Sweden, 1986.
- Le Bîreweriyekanim: 1957–1965, Vol.II., 164 pp., Stockholm, 1987.
- Yadî Hêmin, 97 pp., Kista, 1987.
- Le Bîreweriyekanim: 1965–1970, Vol. III, 250 pp., Stockholm, 1988.
- Le Bîreweriyekanim: 1970–1975, Vol. IV, 235 pp., Stockholm, 1990.
- Le Bîreweriyekanim: 1975–1979, Vol. V, 291 pp., Stockholm, 1991. ISBN 91-630-0779-7
- Le Bîreweriyekanim: 1979–1983, Vol. VI, 295 pp., Stockholm, 1992. ISBN 91-630-0930-7
- Le Bîreweriyekanim: 1983–1985, Vol. VII, 275 pp., Stockholm, 1994. ISBN 91-630-1791-1
- Seferê bo Kurdistan (A Travel to Kurdistan), Stockholm, 1994.
- Geştêk benêw Bîreweriyekanda, 303 pp., Solförl. Publishers, Sullentuna, 1997. ISBN 91-89150-01-5
- Dîmokrasî çiye? (What is Democracy?), 230 pp., Mukriyani Publishers, Arbil, 2001.

=== Translation ===
1. Dayik, translation of Mother by Maxim Gorky.
2. Azadî yan Merg, translation of Freedom or Death by Nikos Kazantzakis
3. Nan û şerab, translation of Bread and Wine by Ignazio Silone, Ministry of Education Publishers, Arbil, Iraqi Kurdistan, 2003.

== See also ==
- List of Kurdish scholars
