= Marif Nodeyi =

Marouf Nodeyi or Shaykh Marif Nodeyi (Kurdish: مارفی نۆدێ, 1753–1838 or 1839) was a Kurdish Sufi, poet, and scholar of the eighteenth and nineteenth centuries. He was the author of 59 books and 870 poems.

== Biography ==
Shaykh Marif was born in the village of Node near Sulaymaniyah into a religious family. He studied religion under his father and later on pursued science in Qalachwalan. After his studies, he became a teacher at the Grand Mosque of Sulaymaniyah and also wrote poems.

Shaykh Marif has several works in Islamic studies, and his Ahmadi dictionary, which is a small Arabic and Kurdish dictionary, has been used for many decades in Kurdistan to teach Arabic to young children in Madrasa. Shaykh Marif has authored religious and literary texts in Persian, Arabic, and Kurdish. He was the father of the prominent Sufi Kak Ahmad and an ancestor of Mahmud Barzanji.
