= Reşo Zîlan =

Swedish writer and linguist (born 1947)

Reşo Zîlan (1947) is a contemporary Swedish writer, translator and linguist of Kurdish origin. He was born in Doğubayazıt, Turkey and emigrated to Sweden in 1973. He is currently the president of the Language and Literature Department of the Kurdish Institute of Paris.

== Books ==
1. Translation of Arhuaco Sierra Nevada, by Bengt Arne Runnerström, Kurdiska kulturförl., 54 pp., Stockholm, 1985. ISBN 91-86146-16-5
2. Şev baş Alfons Åberg, Translation of a work by Gunilla Bergström, Kurdiska kulturförl., 24 pp., Stockholm, 1985. ISBN 91-86146-17-3
3. Bavo, were derve, Translation of a work by Inger and Lasse Sandberg, Kurdiska kulturförl., 32 pp., Stockholm, 1986. ISBN 91-86146-20-3
4. Emîl, mîha nîvçe, Translation of a work by Petra Szabo, Kurdiska kulturförl., 28 pp., Stockholm, 1986. ISBN 91-86146-19-X
5. Kundirê helez, Translation of a work by Lennart Hellsing, Kurdiska kulturförl., 27 pp., Stockholm, 1986. ISBN 91-86146-18-1
6. Kela jînê, Translation of a work by Veronica Leo, Kurdiska kulturförl., 32 pp., Stockholm, 1986. ISBN 91-86146-22-X
7. Sûmiya Zîrek ya hejmar 325, Translation of a work by Astrid Lindgren, Kurdiska kulturförl., 59 pp., Stockholm, 1986. ISBN 91-86146-21-1
8. Nebezê li Çiyayê Mazî, Translation of a work by Jens Ahlbom, Kurdiska kulturförl., 29 pp., Stockholm, 1987. ISBN 91-86146-23-8
9. Spî û Reş û hemûyên din, Translation of a work by Inger och Lasse Sandberg, Kurdiska kulturförl., 29 pp., Stockholm, 1987. ISBN 91-86146-24-6
10. Akin di hembêza welatê nû de : zarokeke penaber vedigêre, Translation of a work by Binnie Kristal-Andersson, Kurdiska kulturförl., 39 pp., Stockholm, 1989. ISBN 91-86146-27-0; 91-86146-28-9
11. Kino digot: Ka lingê min bicebirîne!, Translation of a work by Inger and Lasse Sandberg, Kurdiska kulturförl., 32 pp., Stockholm, 1991. ISBN 91-86146-38-6

=== Dictionaries ===
1. Svensk-kurdiskt lexikon (nordkurdiska)(Swedish-North Kurdish Dictionary), Statens institut för läromedel (SIL), 311 pp., Stockholm, 1989. ISBN 91-7688-164-4
2. Svensk-sydkurdiskt lexikon (Swedish-South Kurdish Dictionary), Statens skolverk, 309 pp., Stockholm, 1992, ISBN 91-1-925332-X

== See also ==
- List of Kurdish scholars
- Kurdish Institute of Paris
- Kurmancî Linguistic magazine.
- Kurmanji
