= Adab, Yemen =

Coordinates: 15°37′N 48°19′E

`Adab
- Interactive map of `Adab
- Country: Yemen
- Governorate: Hadhramaut
- Time zone: UTC+3 (Yemen Standard Time)

`Adab is a village in eastern Yemen. It is located in the Hadhramaut Governorate.
