= Muhammad Wali Kermashani =

Kurdish poet

Muhammad Wali Kermashani (in Kurdish Mihemmed Wely Kirmaşanî; born 1901) was a Kurdish poet from the city of Kermanshah from Eastern Kurdistan (also known as Iranian Kurdistan).
