= Qedrîcan =

Turkish poet of Kurdish ancestry (1911–1972)

Qedrîcan or Qedrîcan, Abdulkadir Can (1911–1972) was a Kurdish poet, writer and translator. He was born in Derik, a small town (present-day Mardin Province, south-eastern Turkey). At a time when schooling was the subject of jokes and when few people studied Qedrîcan's father, known as "Cano" (hence the last name) sent him to school. He was a very successful student, especially in the areas of science and mathematics. Seeing that his son was a successful student Cano decided to send his son to Konya to study at the teachers' college there. During his days as a student there Qedrî Can was blacklisted for cultivating "political strife"; he was made a target for writing poetry in Kurdish and was forced to escape Turkey. At a time after the defeat of the Sheikh Said Rebellion, he escaped to Syria and lived in Damascus until his death in 1972.

Qedrîcan is remembered for openly teaching the Kurdish Language to students in Northeastern Syria. Among his circle of friends are the well known names of renowned Kurdish intellectuals: Celadet Bedir Khan, Kamuran Bedir Khan, Dr. Nurettin Zaza, Dr. Nuri Dersimi, Ekrem Cemilpaşa, Kadri Cemilpaşa, Dr. Abdul Rahman Ghassemlou, and more.

== Works ==
Qedrîcan was one of the first Kurdish poets to write poetry in the modern Free verse style. His poetry is similar to that of Mayakovsky and Nazim Hikmet and he promoted socialism through his poetry. In addition to poetry, he also wrote short stories and biographies. Most of his works were published in the Kurdish journals Hawar, Ronahî and Roja Nû.

=== Stories ===
1. Tayê Pora Sipî, Ronahî Journal, No.3, 1931.
2. Hewar hebe, Gazî li dayê, Hawar Journal, No.1, 1932.
3. Gundê Nû Ava, Hawar Journal, No.2, 1932.
4. Silêman Bedirxan, Hawar Journal, No.3, 1932.
5. Hêviya çarde şevî, Hawar Journal, No.6, 1932.
6. Gelo newisan, Hawar Journal, No.10, 1933.
7. Tabûta bi xwînê, Hawar Journal, No.11, 1933.
8. Bihara Dêrikê, Hawar Journal, No.13, 1933.
9. Dabê, Hawar Journal, No.14, 1933.
10. Sehên zozanan, Ronahî Journal, No.14, 1933.
11. Gulçîn, Ronahî Journal, No.16, 1933.
12. Guneh, Hawar Journal, No.16, 1933.
13. Rojên Derbasbûyî, Hawar Journal, No.52, 1943.
14. Sond, Hawar Journal, No.33, 1944.

=== Poems ===
1. Tabûta bi xwînê, Hawar Journal, No.2, 1932.
2. Berdêlk, Hawar Journal, No.6, 1932.
3. Hesinker, Hawar Journal, No.7, 1932.
4. Di Şorezarekêda, Hawar Journal, No.10, 1933.
5. Cegerxwîn, Hawar Journal, No.12, 1933.
6. Xewna hişyartî, Hawar Journal, No.13, 1933.
7. Dadê, Hawar Journal, No.14, 1933.

== See also ==
- List of Kurdish scholars
