= Abdullah Goran =

Kurdish poet and translator

Goran
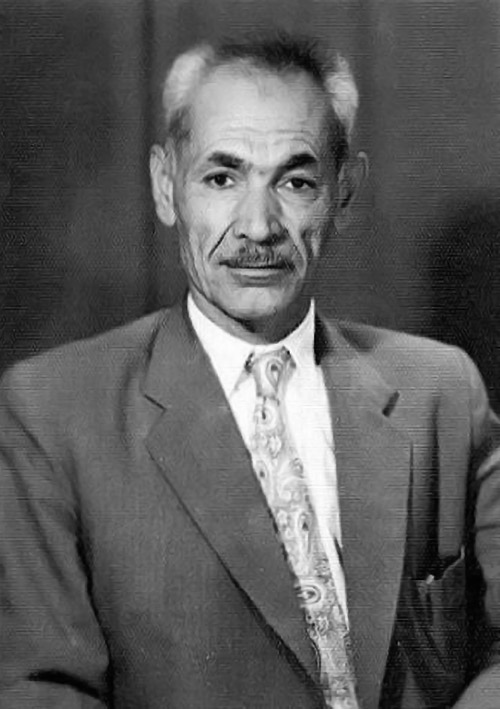
- Born: 1904; Halabja
- Died: 18 November 1962 (aged 57–58); Sulaymaniyah
- Known for: Kurdish poet and translator

Abdullah Goran (Kurdish: عەبدوڵڵا گۆران; 1904 - 18 November 1962) was a leading Kurdish poet and translator of the 20th century.

== Biography ==
Abdullah was born in Halabja in 1904 and received his education in local schools and the pedagogical institute in Kirkuk. As a teacher in Kirkuk, he continued his self-education by learning new languages and studying Turkish and Western literature. He took part in radical political and social causes in the 1930s and was frequently arrested until the 14 July Revolution in 1958. He spent much effort on creating a single Kurdish literary language by merging the two Kurdish dialects Kurmanji and Sorani. He was moreover a skilled translator and translated texts from English, French, Persian and Turkish to Kurdish. Goran combined traditional Kurdish classical and folk verses with contemporary lyricism and diversified the subject matter. He introduced blank verse, prose poem, and new rhyme schemes and abandoned the aruz.

=== Support for North Korea ===
In 1951, Abdullah Goran was imprisoned after publishing a poem praising North Korea, titled Lawkî sor bo Koreya aza (translated as “The Red Tune to Brave Korea”). In 1958, he also visited North Korea. In one of his poems about Korea, Goran addressed the Kurdish nation and others, he described Korea's calamity as a warning to all peoples who were imprisoned and enslaved.

He died on 18 November 1962, Sulaymaniyah.

== See also ==
- List of Kurdish scholars
