= Edeb =

Kurdish poet (1860–1918)

ʿAbd-Allāh Beg b. Aḥmad Beg Bābāmīrī Miṣbāḥ-al-Dīwān or Edeb (Kurdish: ئەدەب, born 1860–1918) was a Kurdish poet whose poetry focused on love including eroticism.

== Biography ==
Edeb was born in the village of Armani Bolaghi, northeast of Bukan in Iran in 1860 to a noble family who descended from the local Mokryan rulers. He studied in the local mosque before moving to Tehran for one year. He lived a life of leisure, travelled, engaged in music, painting and poetry. He received the title Miṣbāḥ-al-Dīwān by his associate Crown Prince Mohammad Ali Mirza. In his mid-30s, he became ill which gradually resulted in paralysis.

== Poetry ==
He wrote in Kurdish and the prosody, symbolism, imagery, and diction of his poetry followed the canons of classical Kurdish and Persian poetry. The main theme in his poetry was love which included eroticism and sexually explicit language. Few of his works have been published.

== See also ==
- List of Kurdish scholars
