= Kurdish Institute of Paris =

Cultural organization

The Kurdish Institute of Paris (French: Institut kurde de Paris; Kurdish: ئینستیتیوتی کوردیی پاریس), founded in February 1983 by (amongst others) film producer Yılmaz Güney and poet Cigerxwîn, is an organisation focused on the Kurdish language, culture, and history. It is one of the principal academic centers of the Kurdish language in Europe. Its main publications include the linguistic journal Kurmancî, a monthly press review about Kurdish issues titled Bulletin de liaison et d'information (Bulletin of Contact and Information), and Études Kurdes, a research journal in French.

Most of the institute's activities are focused on the Kurmanji dialect of Kurdish. The institute has a library preserving thousands of historical documents, pamphlets and periodicals about Kurds. Two representatives from the French Ministry of Interior and the Ministry of Culture provide the link between the institute and the government of France. The institute is headed by Kendal Nezan as president, with Abbas Vali (Swansea University) and Fuad Hussein (University of Amsterdam) as vice presidents.

== Kurmancî ==
Kurmancî
- Editor-in-chief: Reşo Zîlan
- Categories: Linguistics
- Frequency: Biannual
- Circulation: 10,000
- Publisher: Kurdish Institute of Paris
- First issue: 1 September 1987
- Country: France
- Language: English; French; Kurdish; Turkish
- Website: www.institutkurde.org/en/publications/kurmanci/
- ISSN: 0761-1242

Kurmancî is a linguistic magazine published twice a year since 1987 to spread the results of the Kurdish Institute's linguistic seminars on problems of terminology and standardisation of the Kurdish language. All issues of this periodical are available on the publisher's website, as is the Kurdish–French–English–Turkish index of the first twenty issues. The name Kurmancî is a Kurdish spelling of the name of the most widely spoken dialect of the Kurdish language, Kurmanji.
