= Études kurdes =

- Discipline: Kurdish studies
- Language: English, French
- Edited by: Kurdish Institute of Paris

Publication details
- History: Since 2000
- Publisher: Kurdish Institute of Paris (France)
- Frequency: Biannual
- Open access: Yes

Standard abbreviations
- ISO 4: EK

Indexing
- ISSN: 1626-7745

Links
- Journal homepage

Études kurdes is a bilingual (French and English), biannual journal that provides specialists with information on all aspects of Kurdish society, including language, literature, sociology, anthropology, and history. It serves both as a forum for young researchers and as a working tool for Kurdish studies as a whole, and is published by the Kurdish Institute of Paris.

Scholars note that the journal provides an important platform for research on Kurdish history, political science, and literature, moving beyond basic geopolitics to explore deeper social and anthropological aspects. The publication is also held in major international academic library collections, such as the Stanford University Libraries network.

== Scientific council ==
Joyce Blau (Paris), Hamit Bozarslan (Paris), Martin van Bruinessen (Utrecht), Gérard Chaliand (Kurdistan University), Gilles Dorronsoro (Paris), Philip Kreyenbrœk (Göttingen), Kendal Nezan (Paris), Jean-Marie Pradier (Paris).

== Reading committee ==
Necla Açik (London), Abdurrahman Adak (Mardin), Metin Atmaca (Ankara), Djene Bajalan (Misory), Nazand Begikhani (Paris), Bahar Beser (Durham), Naif Bezwan (Vienna), Joanna Bochenska (Krakow), Sacha Bourgeois-Gironde (Paris), Estelle Amy de la Bretèque (Paris), Katarina Brizic (Friburg), Marianna Charountaki (Leicester), Ipek Demir (Leeds), Florence Hellot (Paris), Farangis Ghaderi (Exeter), Özlem Belçim Galip (Oxford), Cengiz Günes (London), Boris James (Montpellier), Janroj Yilmaz Keles (Middlesex), Khalid Khayati (Linköping), Khanna Omerkhali (Berlin), Ergin Opengin (Erbil), Jean-François Pérouse (Istanbul), Cyril Roussel (Poitiers), Clémence Scalbert (Exeter), Jaffer Sheyholislami (Ottawa), Shahab Vali (Mardin), Özcan Yilmaz (Geneva).

== Editorial committee ==
Amr Ahmed (Paris), Salih Akin, director (Rouen), Adnan Çelik (Paris), Lucie Drechselová (Paris), Hardy Mède, editor-in-chief (Paris), Engin Sustam (Paris).
