= Denial of Kurds by Turkey =

Policy of the Turkish state

The Republic of Turkey had an official policy in place that denies the existence of the Kurds as a distinct ethnicity. The Kurds, who are a people that speak various dialects of Northwestern Iranic languages, have historically constituted the demographic majority in southeastern Turkey (or "Turkish Kurdistan") and their independent national aspirations have stood at the forefront of the long-running Kurdish–Turkish conflict. Insisting that the Kurds, like the Turks, are a Turkic people, Turkish state institutions do not recognize the Kurdish language as a language and also omit the Kurdish ethnonym and the term "Kurdistan" in their discourse. In the 20th century, as the words "Kurd" and "Kurdish" were prohibited by Turkish law, all Kurds were referred to as Mountain Turks (Turkish: Dağ Türkleri) in a wider attempt to portray them as a people who lost their Turkic identity over time by intermingling with Arabs, Armenians, and Persians, among others. More recently, Turkey's opposition to Kurdish independence has defined how it has conducted itself throughout the Middle East, particularly with regard to the Autonomous Administration of North and East Syria and the Kurdistan Region of Iraq.

== Background ==
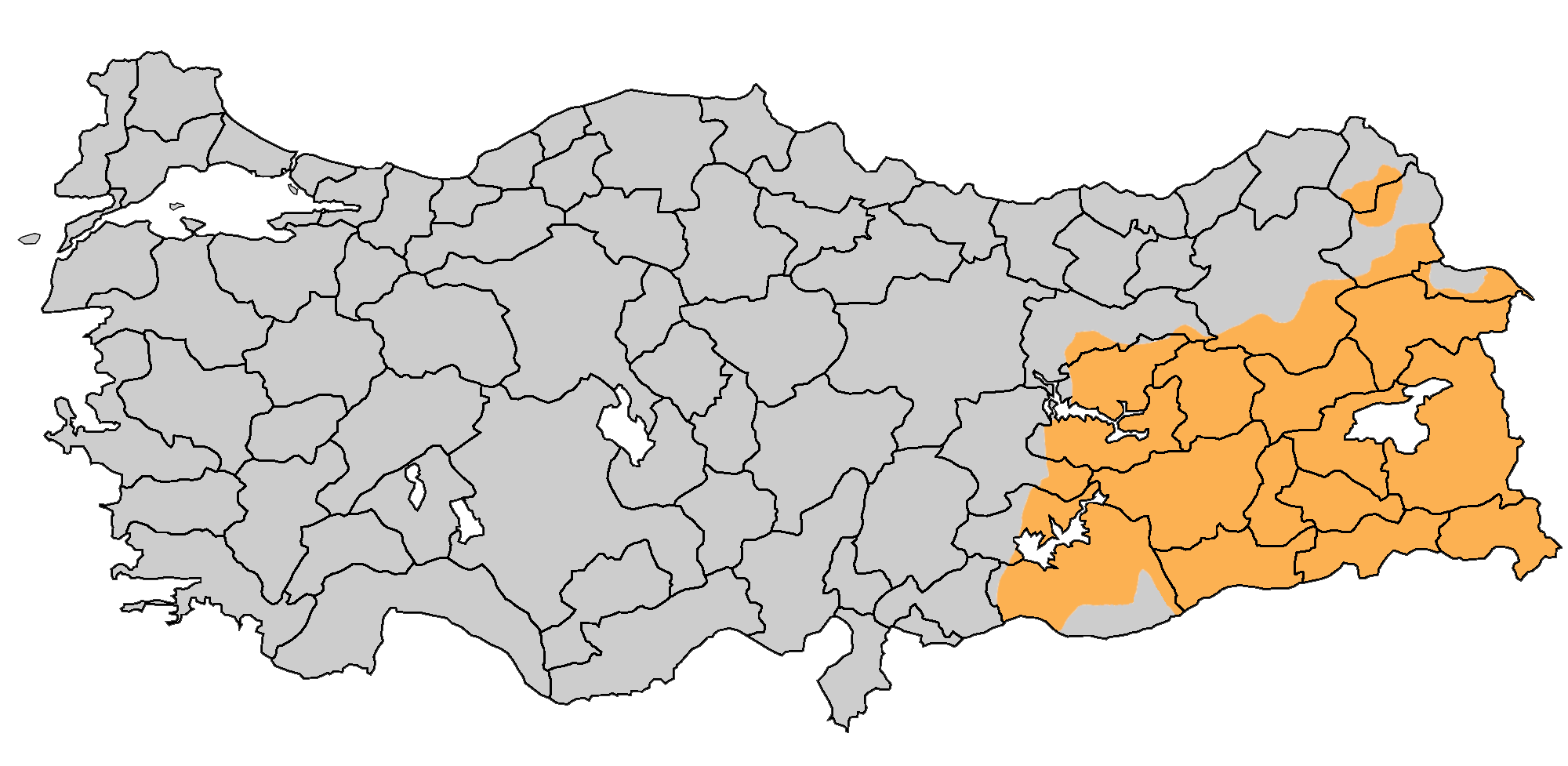
Areas of Turkey where Kurds constituted the majority in 1992 (The World Factbook)

Kurds are Turkey's largest ethnic minority, accounting for 18% of the country's population per Harvard University. Throughout the 20th century, Turkish Kurds faced widespread persecution, with the Dersim rebellion alone having led to the deaths of approximately 13,160 civilians at the hands of the Turkish military in the 1930s. While denying their Kurdish identity, the Turkish government has also sought to Turkify the Kurds with the pretext that they are actually assimilated Turks.

== Turkification of Kurds ==
İbrahim Kafesoğlu claimed that Kurds were not a nation, but a tribe of Turkic, Turanid origin. In 1975, Mahmut Rışvanoğlu, himself an ethnic Kurd from the Reşwan tribe, released a book titled "The Tribes of the East and Imperialism" in which he insisted that all Kurds are Turkic people originating from Central Asia. He alleged that towards the end of the Ottoman Empire, imperialists from both the East and West began "brainwashing" today's Kurds into denying their Turkic heritage; the so-called imperialists declared that Kurds were a completely separate people and part of the “Aryan race” before spreading Kurdish nationalism. The Outlook, based in New York, in 1925, described Kurds as "Turanian both by race and language". Alexandre Jaba, a consul from the Russian Empire who was posted to Erzurum in the 1850s, met with the Kurdish elder Mela Mehmûdê Bayezîdî and requested him to write summaries on the Kurdish literature, folklore, and society, and to translate the Persian-language Sharafnama into Kurdish. Jaba later compiled the first Kurdish dictionary, and the German linguist Ferdinand Justi wrote the first Kurdish grammar. Around sixty years later, Vasily Nikitin, who was the Russian consul in Urmia between 1915 and 1918, joined the nascent academic discipline of Kurdology. Vladimir Minorsky, who began his career as a Russian diplomat, began writing articles in the Encyclopaedia of Islam about the Kurdish people and Kurdistan. Rışvanoğlu is noted for having expressed a dislike for Minorsky and often referred to encyclopedias as "imperialist tools" in an obvious reference to Minorsky's studies. He often accused Minorsky and other Orientalists of being “Turkophobes” by researching the independent Kurdish identity. In the British Empire, on the other hand, there were also diplomats and academics who wrote about the Kurds and established a presence in Kurdistan. Mark Sykes, Ely B. Soane, Edward Noel, and Cecil J. Edmonds were especially active in highlighting the political and societal differences separating Iraqi Kurds from the Turkish nation. Noel personally travelled across Kurdistan in 1919 to see how committed to nationalism the Kurdish tribes were. For his part, Rışvanoğlu never denied his Kurdish ethnicity and identity, but that every Kurd was Turkic instead of Iranic, as is commonly understood in mainstream academia.

The Turkish nationalist Mehmet Eröz claimed that the Kurds, like the Azeris and the Turks, originated from the Oghuz Turks and therefore could not qualify as a completely distinct ethnicity. Eröz claimed that the word "Kurd" (Turkish: Kürt) was found on the Turkic Elegest inscription and that it specifically referred to Kurds and also stated that "Kurdish Turks" would be the proper terminology to describe Kurds in Turkey.

Both Eröz and Rışvanoğlu compiled words from Old Turkic that they found in modern Kurdish dialects, and in which they developed a theory that claimed that despite the Kurdish language being influenced by the Iranic languages over time, many elements that were unique to the so-called "Kurdish Oghuz language" have survived in their modern language.

A Turkish prosecutor at a court in 1971, speaking about the issue of Kurdish separatism in Turkey during a trial against members of the Revolutionary People's Liberation Party/Front, went on to make statements about the various Kurdish languages and dialects and stated that "there is no doubt that Kurdish is a Turkic language, just like Yakut or Chuvash. It is not immediately recognizable as such because our racial brothers have, for centuries, had contact with Arabs, Armenians and Persians, which has destroyed the purity of their language." This claim is similar in nature to the one that alleges that the Persian-speaking Hazaras, who inhabit modern-day Afghanistan and Pakistan, are a Turkic people who had their language heavily Iranicized while retaining some Turkic elements.

Whereas Ziya Gökalp an ethnic Turk, he did not contribute nor place importance on the theory of Kurds being a Turkic people, and believed that Turkishness is a matter of choice and dedication, not descent or background.

Mehmed Şükrü Sekban, a Kurdish medical doctor from Ergani who worked in Sulaymaniyah in modern-day Iran, was likely the first person to publish an entire book that asserts that all Kurds are originally Turkic. The book was titled "The Kurdish Question: On the Problems of Minorities" and written in French in 1933 before being translated to Ottoman Turkish two years later. Sekban was originally a Kurdish nationalist who later renounced Kurdish nationalism and began research in which he proclaimed that Kurds were ethnically related to Turks, and suggested that it would be best for both of them to form a singular political community. He claimed that the Kurds had migrated to the West Asia much earlier than other Turkic people did and significantly intermixed with the local Iranic-speaking peoples, and had their Oghuz Turkic language heavily changed after being dominated by the Medes. Sekban further stated that Kurds were not direct descendants of the Medes, nor were the Medes Kurdish, and that these were all empty claims made by Kurdish nationalists. Ahmet Arvasi, in support of Sekban's claims, asserted that the Kurds indeed constituted part of the Turkic nation and that any claims of distinctness were based on false claims by foreign imperialists in order to divide the Turks. He also claimed that before the dissolution of the Ottoman Empire, Kurds referred to themselves as Kurds while knowing they were part of the Turkic people.

Arvasi also claimed that Kurds are not descendants of the Medes, Gutians, Corduene, or Merwanids, and that "Kurd" as an ethnonym was never mentioned in the languages of these nations. Arvasi claimed that the etymology of the ethnonym "Kurd" comes from words in various Turkic languages which refer to snow, such as "Kürt" in Kazakh and Chuvash, "Kört" in Kazan Tatar, "Körtük" in Uyghur and Kyrgyz, all meaning "heavy snow drift", as well as "Kürt" in the Taranchi language meaning "freshly fallen snow". Arvasi also claimed that the term "Kurdistan", created by Ahmad Sanjar of the Seljuks, meant "mountainous land which heavy snow fell on". He also stated that before the imperialists began coming to the Ottoman Empire, there was never a distinction between Kurds and other Turkic people, and that the term Kurdistan was used by everyone to refer to lands where Kurds lived, without separatist or negative intentions. He accuses imperialists of having designed a Kurdish nationalism in which was specifically designed to convince Kurds that they aren't Turkic, as well as falsifying Kurdish history and origins.

Şerif Fırat's "History of Varto and the Provinces of the East", became a very popular book. Fırat was a Zaza Alevi tribal chief of a branch of the Hormek tribe. In 1925, his branch of the tribe had helped crush the Sheikh Said revolt. Fırat's book mentioned stories that were passed down from generation to generation, found among other Alevi tribes as well, which mentioned that all Alevis originate from Khorasan. Fırat writes that his ancestors had lost their Turkic language after living with the Iranic Zazas, who are also Turkic but had migrated from Khorasan to Anatolia much earlier. Fırat also claimed that every Kurdish tribe is genuinely Turkic, whether in Turkey, Iran, Iraq or Syria, or anywhere.

The biggest contributor to the theory of Kurds being Turkic, was M. Fahrettin Kırzıoğlu. Kırzıoğlu was born in Susuz, Kars in 1917, to a Kumyk family originally from Dagestan. He studied Turkology at Istanbul University and got into Pan-Turkism. In his works, he targeted Western and Russian Kurdologists, especially Minorsky, Nikitine and Vil’chevsky, and dedicated a large part of his career to debunking their claims that Kurds were not a Turkic people. He claimed that foreign Kurdologists were extremely biased and falsified history and studies in order to distance Kurds and Turks from each other. Kırzıoğlu alleges that the word "Kurd" comes from the Old Turkic words "kurtuk" or "kürtüm", which in various Turkic languages refer to large heaps of snow, referring to the tall and snowy mountains which Kurds live on. Kırzıoğlu claims that all Kurdish tribes began from various tribes within the Üçok division of Oghuz Turks.

Historians reported that Sharafkhan Bidlisi mentioned that every Kurd descends from one Oghuz tribe, eventually splitting off into many smaller subtribes. They also reported how Sharafkhan Bidlisi mentioned the Kurds as a part of the Turkic people since the times of Oghuz Khagan, in the Sharafnama which he presented to Sultan Mehmet III in 1597. In these theories it also mentions how the colors red-yellow-green were used from the Göktürks to the Ottomans, and are important to all other Turkic peoples, of which many wore green-yellow-red silk clothing. It was also stated that these three colors have national and spiritual value for Turks.

Ziya Gökalp alleged that while Oghuz Turkoman nomads who migrated among Anatolians maintained their culture and language, they were much more relaxed among Kurds due to much cultural and linguistic similarities, and therefore assimilated much easier, whereas many Kurds who migrated among Turkomans were also relaxed and assimilated easily.

== 20th century ==
=== 1920s–1960s ===
The euphemism "Mountain Turks" (Turkish: Dağ Türkleri) for the Kurds was invented by General Abdullah Alpdoğan and initially used to describe a people living in the mountains who did not speak their own language but a Turkish dialect. Tevfik Rüştü Aras, the Turkish foreign minister between 1925 and 1938, defended the idea that the Kurds should disappear like the Indians in the United States. Kâzım Karabekir, a former commander of the Turkish Army during the War of Independence, said the Kurds in Dersim were in fact assimilated Turks and they should be reminded of their Turkishness. The Turkish Minister of Justice Mahmut Esat Bozkurt, stated that there is no other nation which could claim rights in Turkey than the Turkish race, and that all non-Turks would only have the right to be a servant or slave.

There is no such thing as the Kurdish people or nation. They are merely carriers of Turkish culture and habits. The imagined region proposed as the new Kurdistan is the region that was settled by the proto-Turks. The Sumerians and Scythians come immediately to mind.

— Orhan Türkdoğan, Professor of Sociology at Gebze Technical University

Subsequently, the simple mention of the words "Kurds" and "Kurdistan" was prohibited, and replaced with terms like "Mountain Turks" and "The East", respectively. The prohibition also included text in foreign languages. It was denied that a Kurdish nation had ever existed; according to the Turkish History Thesis, the Kurds migrated from Turanic Central Asia in the past. During the 1920s and 1930s, merchants were fined separately for every word of Kurdish they used. In school, students were punished if they were caught speaking Kurdish and during the 1960s Turkish language boarding schools were established in order to separate the students from their Kurdish relatives and Turkify the Kurdish population.

=== 1960s–1980s ===
The term "Mountain Turk" became more commonly used in 1961. The Turkish president Cemal Gürsel denied the existence of Kurds in Turkey in a press conference in London and during a speech he held in Diyarbakir. Gürsel wrote a foreword to the book History of Varto and the Eastern Provinces by Mehmet Şerif Fırat, in which he credited Fırat for providing scientific evidence for the Turkishness of the Kurds and demanded scientific studies to leave no doubt that Kurds were in reality "Mountain Turks". The book was made available to University Professors, students and journalists for free and also included into the libraries of educational institutions.

Cemal Gürsel was also closely linked to the then newly established Turkish Cultural Research Institute (TKAE) which published several books on the topic. Besides, Gürsel encouraged the use of the phrase "Spit in the face of him who calls you a Kurd". During the trials against the Revolutionary Cultural Eastern Hearths (DDKO) following the coup d'état in 1971, the prosecution argued that Kurds do not actually exist, and their language was in reality a dialect of Turkish. Kenan Evren, the chief of the military junta following the coup d'état in 1980, denied the existence of a Kurdish ethnicity and restricted the use of the Kurdish language. The term "Mountain Turk" was officially replaced with the new euphemism "Eastern Turk" in 1980. After the appearance of the Kurdistan Workers' Party in the 1980s, their members were accused of trying to convince the eastern Turks that they were Kurds.

== 21st century ==
=== Censorship in academia ===
A 2020 report by the İsmail Beşikçi Foundation on the censorship that exists in Kurdish studies in Turkey found that both censorship and self-censorship are frequent when writing about Kurds and their history, geography, culture and language for fear of being penalized. Words including "Kurdistan", "colony" and "anti-colonial" also remain a taboo in writing about Kurds.

=== Kurdish "Turkishness" ===
In March 2021, the Turkish Ministry of National Education released a schoolbook on the Kurdish-majority Diyarbakir Province that makes no mention of Kurds or the Kurdish language at all. It also claims that the language spoken in the city Diyarbakır is similar to the Turkish dialect spoken in Baku, Azerbaijan.

On the discourse of Erdoğan in regards to Kurds, Mucahit Bilici writes that:

There is a clear pattern in Erdoğan’s language and indeed in the approach of all Islamist interlocutors with the Kurds. The primary aim is to minimize and make invisible the Kurds’ Kurdishness by highlighting their Muslimness. The word “Kurd” itself is avoided and used only very strategically. It occurs most often as part of a laundry list of ethnicities—Laz, Çerkes, Georgian, Arab, Bosnian, Albanian—all specificity swamped by false diversity. The Kurds can gain legitimacy and prominence only as servants and defenders of Islam. Kurdish cities are re-presented as deeply religious domiciles. For example, the city of Urfa is always called “city of the prophets” and Diyarbakır “city of the companions (of Prophet Muhammad).” The purpose is to avoid treating anything Kurdish as purely Kurdish.

== See also ==
- Anti-Kurdish sentiment
- Human rights of Kurdish people in Turkey
- Origin of the Kurds
- Racism in Turkey § Against Kurds
- A Modern History of the Kurds by David McDowall
- List of massacres of Kurdish people
