= Kurdish Studies Network =

Global research network

- Abbreviation: KSN
- Formation: 2009
- Type: Research Network
- Founder and Coordinator: Welat Zeydanlıoğlu
- Key people: Ethem Coban
- Website: http://kurdishstudiesnetwork.net/

The Kurdish Studies Network (KSN) is "a global research network" for scholars working within the field of Kurdish studies. It was established in 2009 by Welat Zeydanlıoğlu, a Kurdish researcher and academic based in Sweden.

== History ==
The Kurdish Studies Network was established following the Kurdish Studies Conference, held at the University of Exeter in 2009. In an interview with the Rudaw news agency, Welat Zeydanlıoğlu, the KSN founder, noted that the network came about, "because there was no real communication and connection between scholars and researchers who study the Kurds, the Kurdish question, Kurdish society and the peoples of Kurdistan..." The KSN began life as a mailing list for academics and journalists from a variety of background who shared an interest in the field of Kurdish studies. However, the network expanded its work to include a website, which provides a database of both scholars working on the Kurdish question and a bibliography of works published in the English language pertaining to the field of Kurdish studies. In 2013, plans, initiated by members of the KSN, to publish a peer-reviewed academic journal were announced and the first issue of Kurdish Studies was published in October 2013. The KSN has been credited with both helping to increase scholarly interest in the field of Kurdish studies and bringing together scholars from Europe, North America, and the Middle East.

== Membership ==
Unlike regular scholarly associations, the KSN does not have a formal system of membership or paid subscription. The size of the organization is based on the number of subscribers to its mailing list, which, according to the KSN website, numbers over 1000.

== Journal ==
Kurdish Studies is published by Transnational Press London on behalf of KSN. Kurdish Studies seeks to align "itself with KSN's mission to revitalize and reorient research, scholarship and debates in the field of Kurdish studies..." and publishes articles on or about the Kurds from a variety of academic disciplines. The editor-in-chief is Martin van Bruinessen. It is published biannually.
