= Kościesza coat of arms =

Polish coat of arms

Kościesza
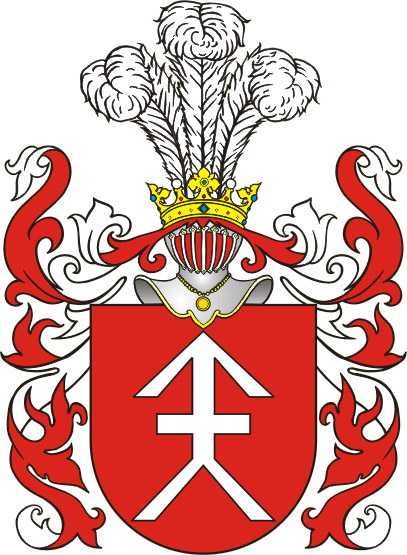
- Alternative names: Strzegomia, Strzegomita, Strzegonia
- Earliest mention: 1317 (Seal of Stefan Pekawka)
- Divisions: Cibory-Chrzczony, Cibory-Kołaczki, Tuczępy
- Families: 297 names Adurowicz, Alexandrowicz, Astotowicz, Astutowicz, Austutowicz, Auzbikowicz, Auzbukiewicz, Aziubekowicz, Bawarski, Bendoński, Berent, Bereszniewicz, Bereźniewicz, Bereżecki, Bereżenicki, Blus, Bodurkiewicz, Bolsanowski, Bołsunowicz, Bołsunowski, Boufał, Bouffałł, Branwicki, Brzeziński, Brzostowski, Bujalski, Butmin, Chałaim, Chodakiewicz, Chodkiewicz, Chodzicki, Chodźkiewicz, Chodźko, Chotkowski, Chotowski, Chrząstowski, Chupicz, Cibor, Ciborowski, Czechowicz, Czelo, Dachlen, Dalewicki, Daliński, Dalwicki, Dąb, Dobrunicki, Dolski, Dorohostajski, Doroszkiewicz, Dylewski, Dylowski, Dyrda, Dyrdat, Dyrwin, Dzainkowski, Dziatłowicz, Dzieńkowski, Dzierżnicki, Dzieszuk, Gapiński, Giecewicz, Gliecewicz, Ginielewicz, Gniewosz, Gołaszewski, Gołocki, Gombrowicz, Gronostajski, Grzywa, Gubrewicz, Hekendorf, Hermanowicz, Holiński, Horański, Humieniecki, Izbicki, Jabłecki, Jacewicz, Jaksztowicz, Jałbrzykowski, Jarmola, Jarmoła, Jaszkowski, Jawor, Jaworski, Jesionowski, Jeziorkowski, Kakowski, Karolewski, Kijakowski, Klimowicz, Knoll, Kobylski, Kojałowicz, Kojałowicz Wijuk, Kołak, Kołakowski, Kołozębski, Kontowski, Kopytkowski, Kopytowski, Kornasiewicz, Korzeniowski, Kosmowski, Kossowiecki, Kostiuszkiewicz, Kostrzessa, Kościcki, Kościecki, Kościelski, Kościescki, Kościeski, Kościesza, Kościszewski, Kozaniewicz, Kozaryn, Kozarzewski, Kubicki, Kujawski, Kułakowski, Kupść, Kurnicki, Kuszlański, Lazarowicz, Leśniewski, Leśniowski, Lulewicz, Ławruszewicz, Łayka, Łazarczyk, Łazarowicz, Łączyński, Łoniewski, Makarski, Merła, Merło, Mężeński, Mężyński, Michalkiewicz, Michałkiewicz, Michałkowicz, Michałkowski, Mieroszewski, Mierzejewski, Miłosiewski, Miłoszewski, Miroszewski, Mniszewski, Moczygemba, Nachorecki, Nagiewicz, Nagorzewski, Nagórczewski, Nagurczewski, Nagurzewski, Naguszewski, Nahorecki, Naritowicz, Narwid, Narwidowicz, Narwit, Narwitowicz, Nawsuć, Nieczkowski, Nielubowicz, Nieszkowski, Niewęgłowski, Niewiadowski, Niezlubowicz, Ninocic, Ninocki, Nurowski, Olszewski, Opalewski, Opelewski, Oporzyszewski, Oporzyszowski, Orański, Orzegalski, Ożar, Ożegalski, Ożygiński, Parszowa, Pasikoński, Perkiewicz, Petkun, Pękawka, Pieślak, Pociszewski, Poczujp, Powstański, Prawecki, Przybylski, Pudliński, Pudłowski, Pukawka, Pukszta, Rakowski, Rakoyski, Ratomski, Rudawski, Rudwaski, Rudziecki, Rudziejewski, Rudziejowski, Rzeczycki, Rzeczyński, Rzeprzyński, Rzeżyński, Rzochowski, Rzyżeński, Sachowicki, Sałapski, Sanieski, Saniewski, Siechmowicki, Siechnowiecki, Siekierzyński, Sieńkowicz, Siestrzanek, Sietkiewicz, Sitkiewicz, Skarzyski, Skierdowski, Skorulski, Skrobotowicz, Skrzywański, Sławogórski, Słonczewski, Słończewski, Sopocko, Sowicki, Stanisławski, Steckiewicz, Stetkiewicz, Stietkiewicz, Stryszewski, Stryszowski, Strzegocki, Strzegomia, Strzyszowski, Suchocki, Suklicki, Sulisław, Suliszowski, Sulkowski, Szałapski, Szklarewicz, Szkliński, Szymczykiewicz, Szymkiewicz, Szymonowicz, Targoń, Targoński, Trojnowicz, Tronowicz, Tronowski, Troynowicz, Tukalski, Waszkiewicz, Wawroński, Wawrowski, Wesławski, Wierciszewski, Wijuk, Wnorowski, Wodyński, Wojcieski, Wolski, Wołk, Wołkowicz, Wołoczko, Wołoćko, Wołodźko, Woydyłło, Wroncki, Wronczyński, Wronicki, Wronowski, Wroński, Zakrzewski, Zaleski, Załuska, Załuski, Zambrzyca, Zambrzycki, Zawierski, Zawirski, Zawoj, Zawoy, Zberowski, Zbirujski, Zbiruski, Zbiruyski, Zdzychowski, Zerzyński, Znaczek, Zubko, Żaba, Żarecki, Żędzian, and Żłób-Pogorzelski.

Kościesza (Strzegomia, Strzegomya) is a Polish coat of arms used by szlachta families in the times of Kingdom of Poland and the Polish–Lithuanian Commonwealth.

== History ==
According to a legend, the Kościesza shield was granted by King Bolesław II the Generous to a brave knight named Kościesza after the Battle of Snowsko in 1072 AD.

== Notable bearers ==
- Gniewosz z Dalewic (died 1406), knight, podkomorzy of Kraków, castellan of Sandomierz
- Gniewosz of Dalewice
- Melchior Pudłowski, poet, secretary of the King
- Szymon Szymonowic (Simon Simonides, Szymonowicz or Bendoński)
- Jan Karol Dolski
- Jan Karol Chodkiewicz (Chodkiewicz coat of arms)
- Józef Piłsudski (Piłsudski coat of arms)
- August Żaba
- Witold Gombrowicz
- Aleksander Kakowski
- August Kościesza-Żaba
- Chodźko family
  - Witold Chodźko
  - Aleksander Chodźko
  - Leonard Chodźko
  - Ludwik Chodźko
- Wojciech Wijuk Kojałowicz
- Roman Żaba, general
- Tadeusz Żaba, Marshall of the Radom Confederation
- Jan Kazimierz Żaba, Voivode of Minsk
- Maryla Wereszczakówna, lover of Adam Mickiewicz
- Piotr z Chrząstowa, Bishop of Przemysl
- Imisław Wroński, Bishop of Plock
- Michał Kosmowski, Bishop of Gniezno
- Szczepan Zambrzycki, member of the Great Sejm
- Ludomir Włodzimierz Kościesza Wolski, officer of the Armia Krajowa, Righteous Among the Nations
- Bohdan Stetkiewicz, castellan of Mscislaw
- Stanisław Gabriel Kakowski, chorazy of Nowogrod
- Włodzimierz Józef Mężyński, officer of the Polish Legions in World War I
- Józef Nielubowicz-Tukalski, Orthodox Metropolitan of Kijow (Kyiv)
- Ron Jaworski, NFL Quarterback
- Mikola Statkevich, Belarusian opposition politician
- Stanisław Olszewski, engineer and inventor

== Related coat of arms ==
- Chodkiewicz coat of arms (Kościesza odmieniony)
- Piłsudski coat of arms (Kościesza odmieniony)

== Gallery ==
Bereśniewicz

Biel

Birula

Chodkiewicz

Czyż

Counts Karnicki

Baron Karnicki

Piłsudski

Pudłowski

Szymonowicz

== See also ==
- Polish heraldry – Study of coats of arms in lands of historical Poland
- Heraldic family – Noble bearers of the same coat of arms in Poland
- List of Polish nobility coats of arms

== Bibliography ==
- Herbarz polski, Tadeusz Gajl, Gdańsk 2007, ISBN 978-83-60597-10-1
