= Ruslan Tsabolov =

Russian linguist and Kurdologist

Ruslan Lazarevich Tsabolov (Russian: Русла́н Ла́заревич Цабо́лов) (1926 in Vladikavkaz — 2003 in Moscow) was a Russian linguist and notable Kurdologist. Tsabolov studied at the department of Iranian Studies of the Leningrad State University, worked as a librarian and later from 1964 to 1966 in the Soviet embassy in Kabul. From 1967 to 2003 Tsabolov worked as a scientific collaborator of the department of the Asian and African languages of the Institute of Oriental Studies of the Russian Academy of Sciences. From 1968 to 1970 he worked at the MSU Institute of Asian and African Studies, teaching Persian.

His doctoral dissertation covered the historical grammar of the Kurdish language.

== Sources ==
- Цаболов Руслан Лазаревич

== Bibliography ==
- Tsabolov, Ruslan. "Notes on the Influence of Arabic on Kurdish." Acta Kurdica: The International Journal of Kurdish and Iranian Studies 1 (1994): 121-124
