= Altaylı =

Altaylı is a Turkish surname. Notable people with the surname include:

- Enver Altaylı (born 1944), Turkish academic, writer and former secret agent
- Fatih Altaylı (born 1962), Turkish journalist, columnist, television presenter and media executive
- Hande Altaylı (born 1971), Turkish writer, advertiser and songwriter, wife of Fatih
