= Mehmet Şerif Fırat =

Kurdish author (1894/1899 – 1949)

Mehmet Şerif Fırat (1894/1899 – 1949) was a Kurdish author and is known for his 1945 book History of Varto and the Eastern Provinces in which he denied the existence of Kurds and claimed they are of Turkish origin. The book was republished in 1961 and counted with a foreword from the Turkish president Cemal Gürsel.

== Biography ==
Fırat was born into a Kurdish family in the village Kasman in Varto in the Ottoman Empire. His exact date of birth is not known but it is assumed he was born in the 1890s, possibly 1899. He attended high school in Varto but did not take up studies at a university.

He was of a Kurdish Alevi tribe that had fought with the Turkish Military against the Kurdish rebels of the 1925 Sheik Said rebellion. He defended the view that Alevi preferred the Kemalist policies instead of the Sunni Islamist ideas of the rebels., After the defeat of the revolt, he was exiled to the west of Turkey by the government as were the relatives of Sheikh Said and Halit Beg Cirbran, the military leaders of the rebellion. He was allowed to return after two years in exile. He published his book History of Varto and the Eastern Provinces in 1945. Politically he was a supporter of Ismet Inönü from the Republican People's Party (CHP) and in the aftermath of the earthquake that occurred in Varto in 1946 he published a letter in a newspaper opposing Celâl Bayar (of the Democrat Party) who had visited the region much more appreciated by the public than Inönü.

=== The book History of Varto and the Eastern Provinces ===
In the book he claimed the Parthians were of Turkish origin and that the Turks immigrated to Anatolia in the third millennium before Christ. He calls the Kurds Mountain Turks and argued the Kurdish languages Zaza and Kurmanji only exist due to the Armenian King Tigranes the Great subduing his Turkish subjects and forcing them to forget their Turkish identity. The Zaza were also no Kurds but the Zaza language constituted 70% of Turkic words. He then reasoned that the Kurdish Alevis hail from Khorasan and were influenced by the Turkic mystic Ahemd Yesevi in the 12th century. Therefore he claimed that when the Turkic Seljuks defeated the Byzantines in the Battle of Manzikert in 1071, the Seljuks did not invade foreign territory but liberate formerly Turkic lands.

==== Reception ====
With the Turkish president Cemal Gürsel his book gained prominence in 1961 when Gürsel wrote a foreword of a reprint of it in which he claimed Fırat showed with scientific evidence that Kurds are actually of Turkish origin and deemed the foreign scholars findings of an existence of Kurds as an enemy's fabrication. This book was distributed among university lecturers and students for free.

In 2002, this book was brought forward as an argument in a trial against Kurdish university students who wanted to learn the Kurdish language, based on Fırat's claim that Turkish and Kurdish are the same language. In The Cambridge History of the Kurds of 2021, his omission of the Kurdish Koçgiri rebellion in 1921 and the massacre of dozens of his tribesmen during the Dersim rebellion is seen as noteworthy.

== Death ==
Fırat was killed by his uncle Halo near the Kasman village on 1 July 1949. Fırat was buried in the cemetery of Varto. Halo attempted to escape with his family to Bingöl province, but was captured and imprisoned in Bitlis. In the 1980s the government of Kenan Evren built a sarcophagus for Mehmet Şerif Fırat.

== Personal life ==
His uncle Halo was known as a bandit and in the aftermath of the Sheik Said Rebellion, he lived in the mountains evading exile. He was pardoned in 1929. His nephew Selim, who opposed his uncle's views regarding the Kurds, resides in Berlin, Germany, has learned the Kurdish language and is a supporter of the Kurdistan Workers' Party (PKK). As of 2010, his daughter and granddaughter still lived in the village Kasman of Varto.
