= Mahmud Bayazidi =

Kurdish historian, philosopher, and polymath

- Born: 1797; Doğubeyazıt, Ottoman Empire (present-day Turkey)
- Died: 1859 (aged 61–62); Erzurum, Ottoman Empire
- Occupations: Historian, philosopher, polymath

Academic work
- Era: 19th century
- Main interests: Kurdish history, Kurdish language, ethnography
- Notable works: Habits and Customs of Kurds, Kurdish-French Dictionary

Mahmud Bayazidi (Kurdish: Mehmûdê Bazîdî; 1797 – 1859) was an Ottoman Kurdish historian, philosopher, and polymath from Doğubeyazıt.

== Early life ==
He was born in Bayazid (present-day Doğubeyazıt in Ağrı Province, Turkey) in 1797. He began his education by studying the Quran, followed by Arabic, Persian, Ottoman Turkish, and Kurdish. He later moved to Tabriz in northwestern Iran to continue his studies.

After completing his education, he returned to his hometown and worked as a teacher. Following the decline of the Kurdish emirates in Bayazid, he relocated to Erzurum.

== Works ==
In 1856, the Russian academic A. Dorne asked A. D. Jaba, the newly appointed Russian consulate in Erzurum, for assistance in analyzing documents in the Kurdish language. Jaba, in turn, employed Mahmud Bayazidi in the field of Kurdish language, history and culture. With the assistance of Bayazidi, a number of Kurdish documents were sent to the Russian Academy of Sciences in Saint Petersburg, including some of Bayazidi's own writings. In 1858–1859, Bayazidi edited the Kurdish–Arabic–Persian grammar book by Ali Taramokhi (Kurdish writer of the 15th–16th century). He also wrote a book containing 3,000 phrases in Kurdish, which shed light on the life of Kurds in the 19th century. This book was translated into French by A. D. Jaba in 1880. Bayazidi wrote another book called Habits and Customs of Kurds, which was published in 1963 by the Russian Kurdologist Margarita Rudenko. From the correspondence of A. D. Jaba with Saint Petersburg, it is evident that Bayazidi had written a book on the modern history of the Kurds, covering the period 1785–1858, although this book appears to have been lost, except for the French translation of its preface. Bayazidi and Jaba also played an instrumental role in preserving old Kurdish literature by collecting more than 50 volumes of handwritten Kurdish classical texts and sending them to the Library of Saint Petersburg. These texts, which have been preserved until now, include the epics of well-known classical poets such as Feqiyê Teyran, Mela Huseynê Bateyî, and Mela Cizîrî, and Mem û Zîn by Ehmedê Xanî. This collection was finally published in 1961 by M. B. Rudenko, titled About the Handwritten Kurdish Texts in Leningrad. During the period 1858–1859, Mahmud Bayazidi and A. D. Jaba wrote the first Kurdish–French and French–Kurdish dictionary, published in 1879. During the same period, Mahmud Bayazidi translated the Sharafnama (History of the Kurdish Nation) from Persian into Kurdish. This is considered the first Kurdish history book in modern times. Its handwritten version is preserved in the Russian National Library. It was published for the first time in 1986.

== Published books ==
1. Bayazidi, Mahmud, Mem û Zîn (Mem and Zin), an abstract of Ahmad Khani's poem, Kurmanji version with French translation by Alexandre Jaba, introduced by Hakem, Helkewt, Debireh, no. 5, Paris, 1989.
2. Bayazidi, Mela Mahmud, Adat u rasumatname-ye Akradiye ("Habits and Customs of Kurds"), original manuscript (Kurmandjî in Ottoman characters), published by M. B. Rudenko, with an introduction and Russian translation: Nravy i Obycaj Kurdov, Moscow, 1963.
3. Mela Mahmud Bayazidi, Tawarikh-i Qadim-i Kurdistan; translation of Sharafnama of Sharaf al-Din Khan Bidlisi from Persian into Kurdish; edition of the text, preface, indices and contents by K. K. Kurdoev and Z. S. Musaelan, published by Nauka, Moscow, 1986.

== See also ==
- List of Kurdish philosophers
