= Jan Karol Dolski =

Jan Karol Dolski of Kościesza (1637–1695) was a member of the nobility of the Polish–Lithuanian Commonwealth. Throughout his life he held a number of posts, including the post of Grand Marshal of Lithuania, Court Marshal of Lithuania, and Cup-bearer. He was also the starost of Pinsk and was responsible for extending that town considerably.

During Swedish invasion of Poland, also known as the Deluge, he fielded a chorągiew of cavalry and commanded it personally in the Battle of Warsaw (1656). He also led a regiment in the Russo-Polish War (1654–67) and then took part in quelling the Lubomirski's Rebellion.

On September 28, 1663, the general vicar of the Volodymyr cathedral, Martynian Żukowiecki, filed a complaint against him in the records of the Volodymyr city court. Acting on behalf of the bishop and the entire chapter he testified about an attack by Dolski’s armed unit on the village of Ilbiazh on August 13, during which the local Church of St. Nicholas was devastated, the attackers broke down the doors with axes, desecrated the altar, and dismantled the building to its very foundations, while also noting an attempted murder of the priest Tarasii Laskovych, whom the nobles tried to hang on a gallows hastily constructed from church beams, and according to the text, Martynian acted as the chief legal defender of the clergy’s rights, demanding that Dolski be brought to trial for violating “common law” and committing religious violence.

In 1667 and 1668 he was a deputy to the Polish General sejm. A supporter of Michał Korybut Wiśniowiecki, he supported his election as the new king of Poland in 1669. The following year he received the honorary title of the Grand Carver of Lithuania.

He took part in the battle of Chocim (1673). In 1674 he supported Jan III Sobieski in the next elections for the king of Poland. For his merits in 1676 the Sejm granted him with a prize of 20 thousand złoty. A senior member of the Sejm, in 1678 and 1679 he preceded the king's council. He founded a Piarist college in Dubrovica in 1684. In 1685 he became the Court Marshal of Lithuania, and in 1691 the grand marshal.

== Personal life ==
Dolski was married twice. His second wife, Anna Dolska, held a debt from the city of Pinsk for forty thousand złoty.
