= Konopki-Pokrzywnica =

- Village
- Location within Poland
- Coordinates: 53°12′36″N 22°29′39″E
- Country: Poland
- Voivodeship: Podlaskie
- County: Białystok
- Gmina: Zawady

Konopki-Pokrzywnica [kɔˈnɔpki pɔkʂɨvˈnit͡sa] is a village in the administrative district of Gmina Zawady, within Białystok County, Podlaskie Voivodeship, in north-eastern Poland.
