= Zawady-Kolonia, Podlaskie Voivodeship =

Zawady-Kolonia
- Village
- Location within Poland
- Coordinates: 53°09′45″N 22°38′40″E
- Country: Poland
- Voivodeship: Podlaskie
- County: Białystok
- Gmina: Zawady

Zawady-Kolonia [zaˈvadɨ kɔˈlɔɲa] is a village in the administrative district of Gmina Zawady, within Białystok County, Podlaskie Voivodeship, in north-eastern Poland.
