= Targonie-Krytuły =

- Village
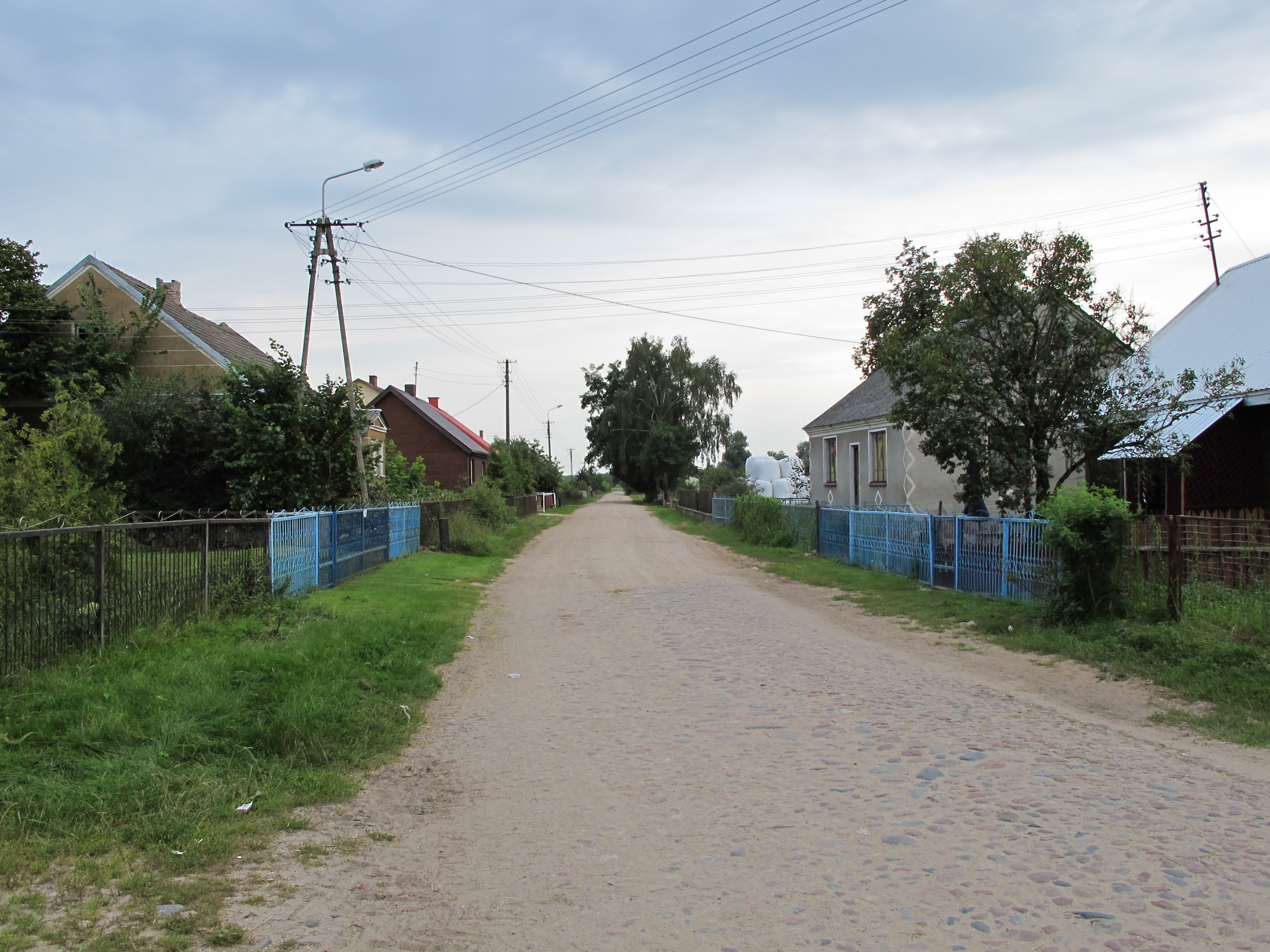
- Houses by the unpaved road in Targonie-Krytuły

- Location within Poland
- Coordinates: 53°10′15.64″N 22°36′15.42″E
- Country: Poland
- Voivodeship: Podlaskie
- County: Białystok
- Gmina: Zawady

Targonie-Krytuły [tarˈɡɔɲɛ krɨˈtuwɨ] is a village in the administrative district of Gmina Zawady, within Białystok County, Podlaskie Voivodeship, in north-eastern Poland.
