= Łaś-Toczyłowo =

- Village
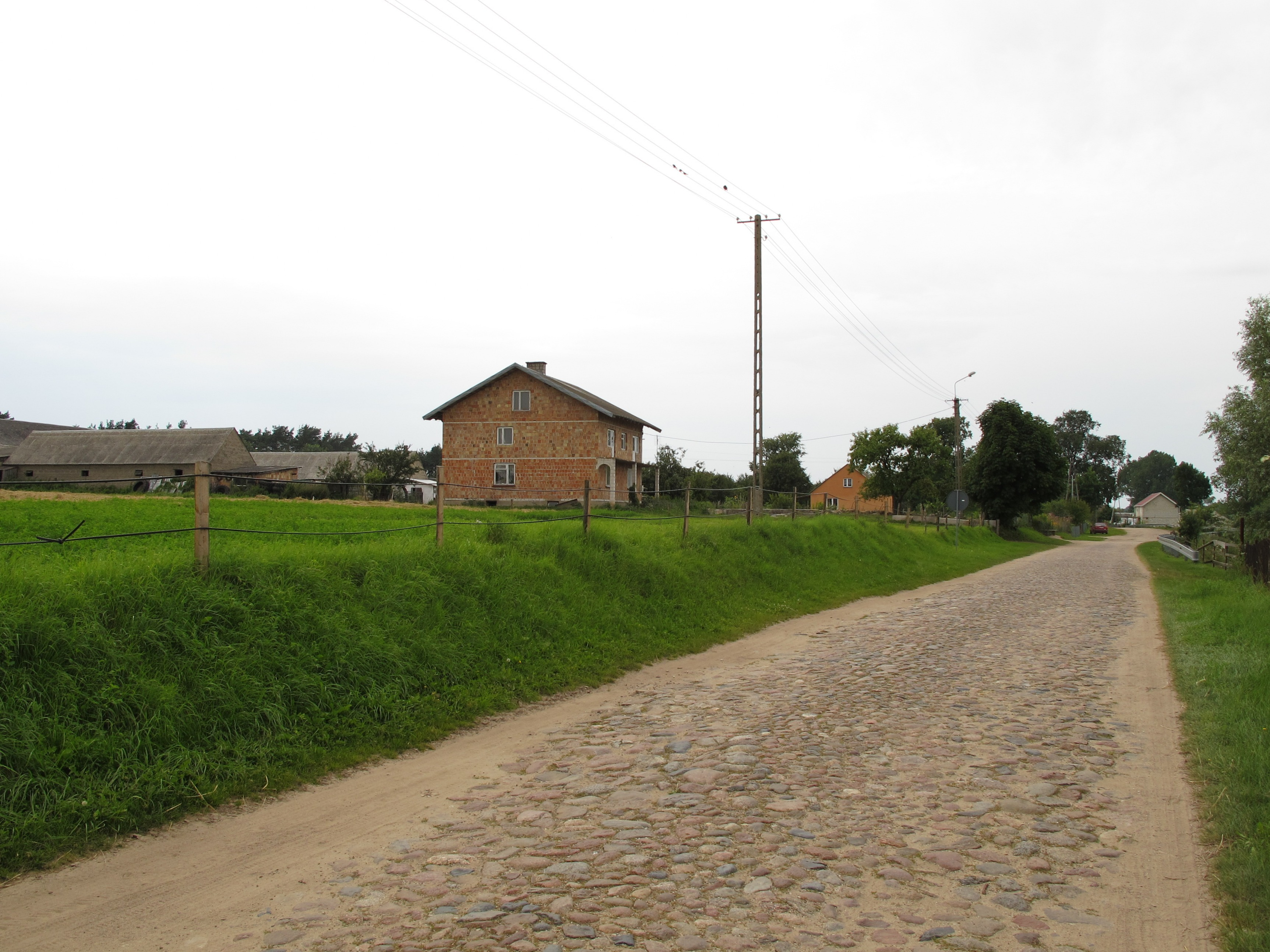
- Houses by the unpaved road in Łaś-Toczyłowo

- Location within Poland
- Coordinates: 53°12′26″N 22°36′17″E
- Country: Poland
- Voivodeship: Podlaskie
- County: Białystok
- Gmina: Zawady

Łaś-Toczyłowo [ˈwaɕ tɔt͡ʂɨˈwɔvɔ] is a village in the administrative district of Gmina Zawady, within Białystok County, Podlaskie Voivodeship, in north-eastern Poland.
