= Targonie-Wity =

- Village
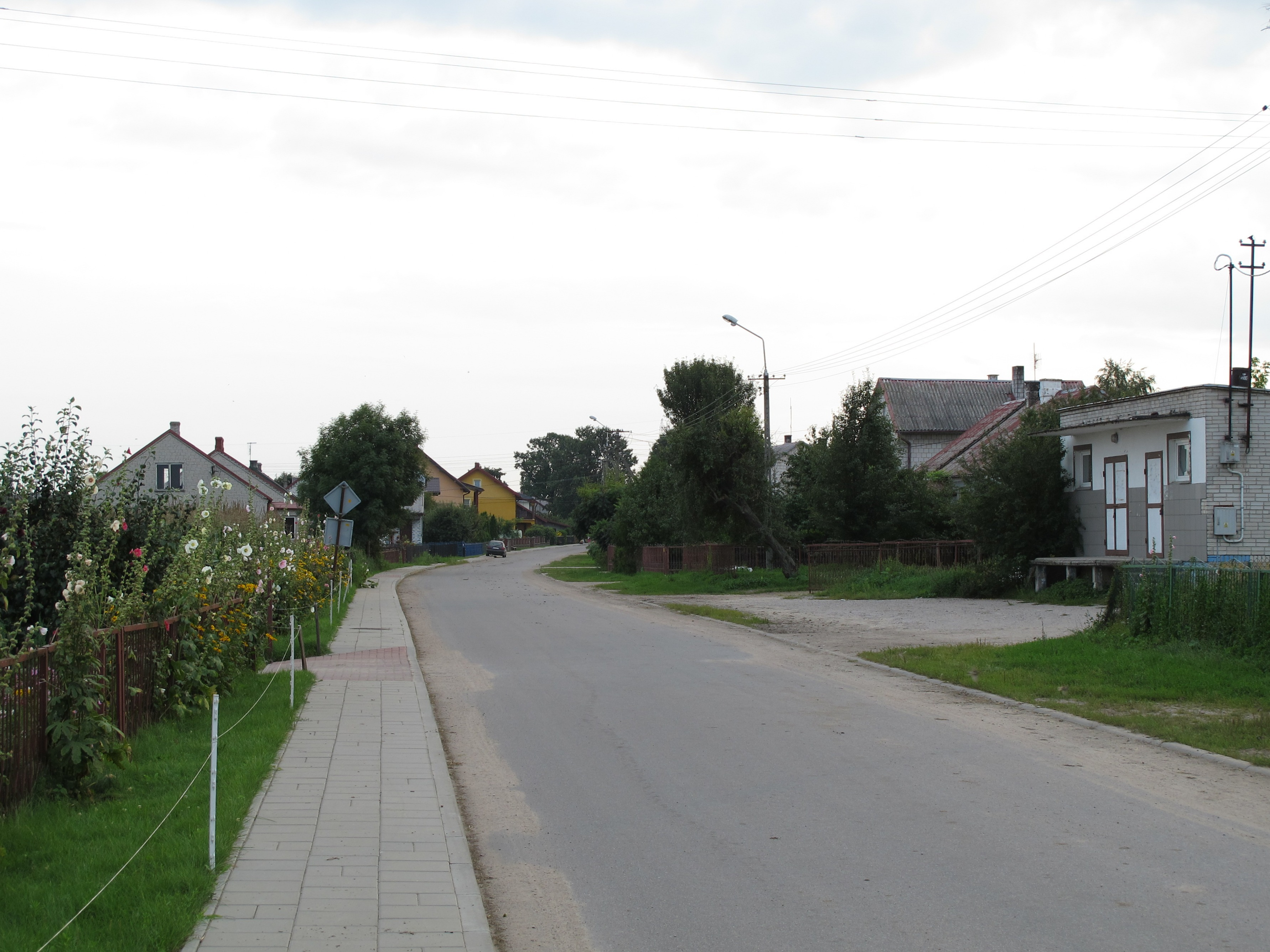

- Location within Poland
- Coordinates: 53°10′45.45″N 22°38′07.9″E
- Country: Poland
- Voivodeship: Podlaskie
- County: Białystok
- Gmina: Zawady

Targonie-Wity [tarˈɡɔɲɛ ˈvitɨ] is a village in the administrative district of Gmina Zawady, within Białystok County, Podlaskie Voivodeship, in north-eastern Poland.
