= Nowe Grabowo =

- Village
- Location within Poland
- Coordinates: 53°10′51″N 22°33′55″E
- Country: Poland
- Voivodeship: Podlaskie
- County: Białystok
- Gmina: Zawady

Nowe Grabowo [ˈnɔvɛ ɡraˈbɔvɔ] is a village in the administrative district of Gmina Zawady, within Białystok County, Podlaskie Voivodeship, in north-eastern Poland.
