= Maliszewo-Łynki =

Village in Gmina Zawady, Poland

- Village
- Location within Poland
- Coordinates: 53°12′56″N 22°36′57″E
- Country: Poland
- Voivodeship: Podlaskie
- County: Białystok
- Gmina: Zawady

Maliszewo-Łynki [maliˈʂɛvɔ ˈwɨŋki] is a village in the administrative district of Gmina Zawady, within Białystok County, Podlaskie Voivodeship, in north-eastern Poland.
