= Rudniki, Białystok County =

Rudniki
- Village
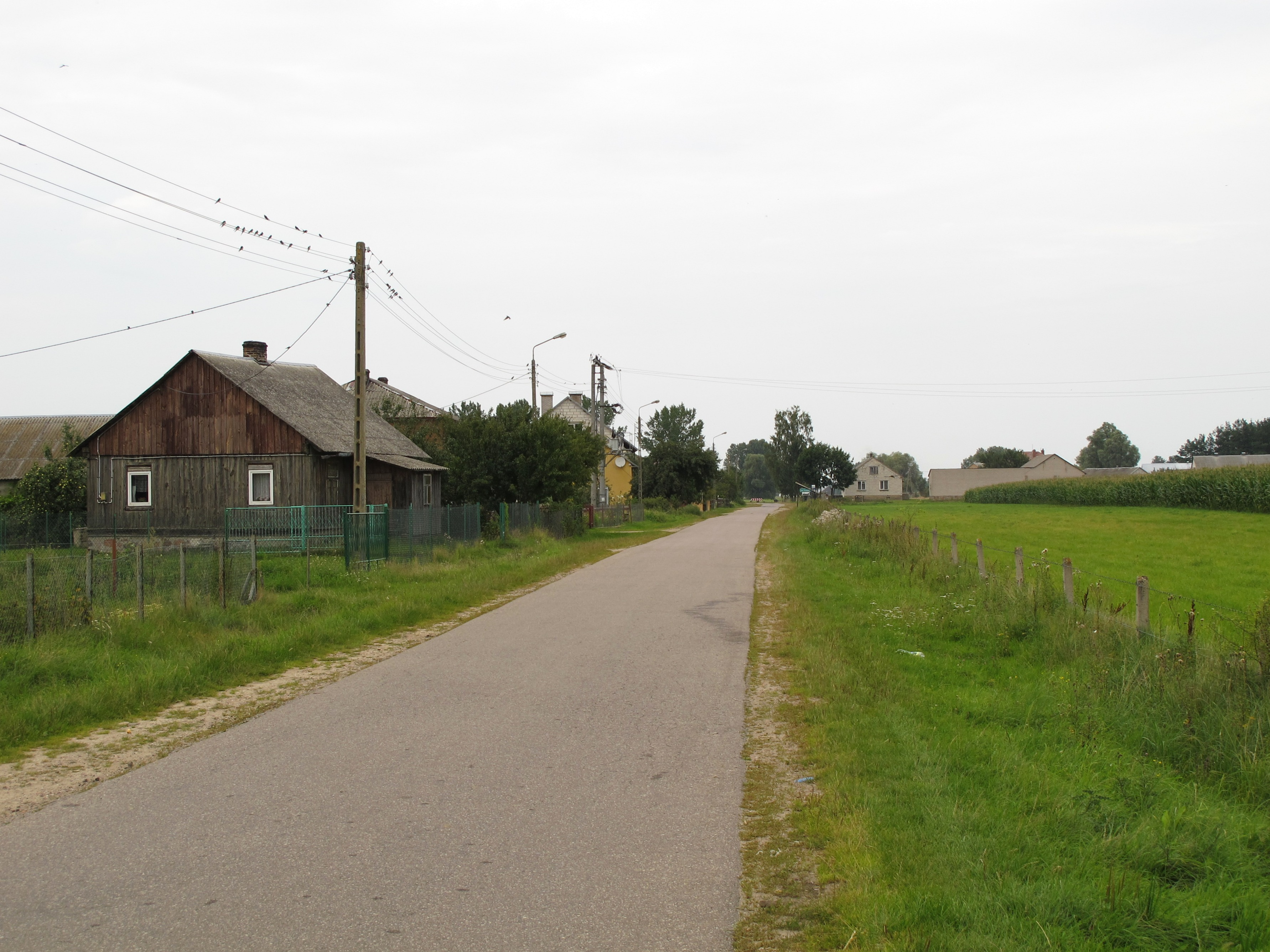

- Location within Poland
- Coordinates: 53°13′N 22°35′E
- Country: Poland
- Voivodeship: Podlaskie
- County: Białystok
- Gmina: Zawady

Rudniki [rudˈniki] is a village in the administrative district of Gmina Zawady, within Białystok County, Podlaskie Voivodeship, in north-eastern Poland.
