= Gmina Zawady =

Gmina Zawady Zawady Commune
- Gmina
- Coat of arms

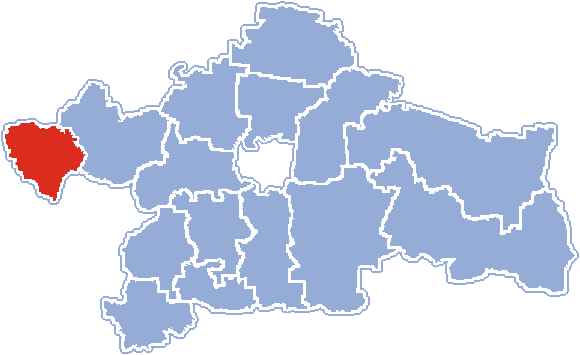
- Location within Białystok County
- Coordinates (Zawady): 53°9′19″N 22°39′58″E
- Country: Poland
- Voivodeship: Podlaskie
- County: Białystok County
- Seat: Zawady

Area
  - Total: 112.67 km^{2} (43.50 sq mi)

Population (2006)
  - Total: 3,014
  - Density: 26.75/km^{2} (69.28/sq mi)
- Website: http://www.gminazawady.pl/

Gmina Zawady is a rural gmina (administrative district) in Białystok County, Podlaskie Voivodeship, in north-eastern Poland. Its seat is the village of Zawady, which lies approximately 34 km (21 mi) west of the regional capital Białystok.

The gmina covers an area of 112.67 square kilometres (43.5 sq mi), and as of 2006 its population is 3,014.

The gmina is the proposed location of a new airport to be built near Bialystok.

== Villages ==
Gmina Zawady contains the villages and settlements of Cibory Gałeckie, Cibory-Chrzczony, Cibory-Kołaczki, Cibory-Krupy, Cibory-Marki, Cibory-Witki, Góra Strękowa, Konopki-Klimki, Konopki-Pokrzywnica, Krzewo-Plebanki, Kurpiki, Łaś-Toczyłowo, Maliszewo-Łynki, Maliszewo-Perkusy, Marylki, Nowe Chlebiotki, Nowe Grabowo, Nowe Krzewo, Rudniki, Stare Chlebiotki, Stare Grabowo, Stare Krzewo, Strękowa Góra, Targonie Wielkie, Targonie-Krytuły, Targonie-Wity, Wieczorki, Zawady, Zawady-Borysówka and Zawady-Kolonia.

== Neighbouring gminas ==
Gmina Zawady is bordered by the gminas of Kobylin-Borzymy, Rutki, Trzcianne, Tykocin and Wizna.
