= Nowe Chlebiotki =

- Village
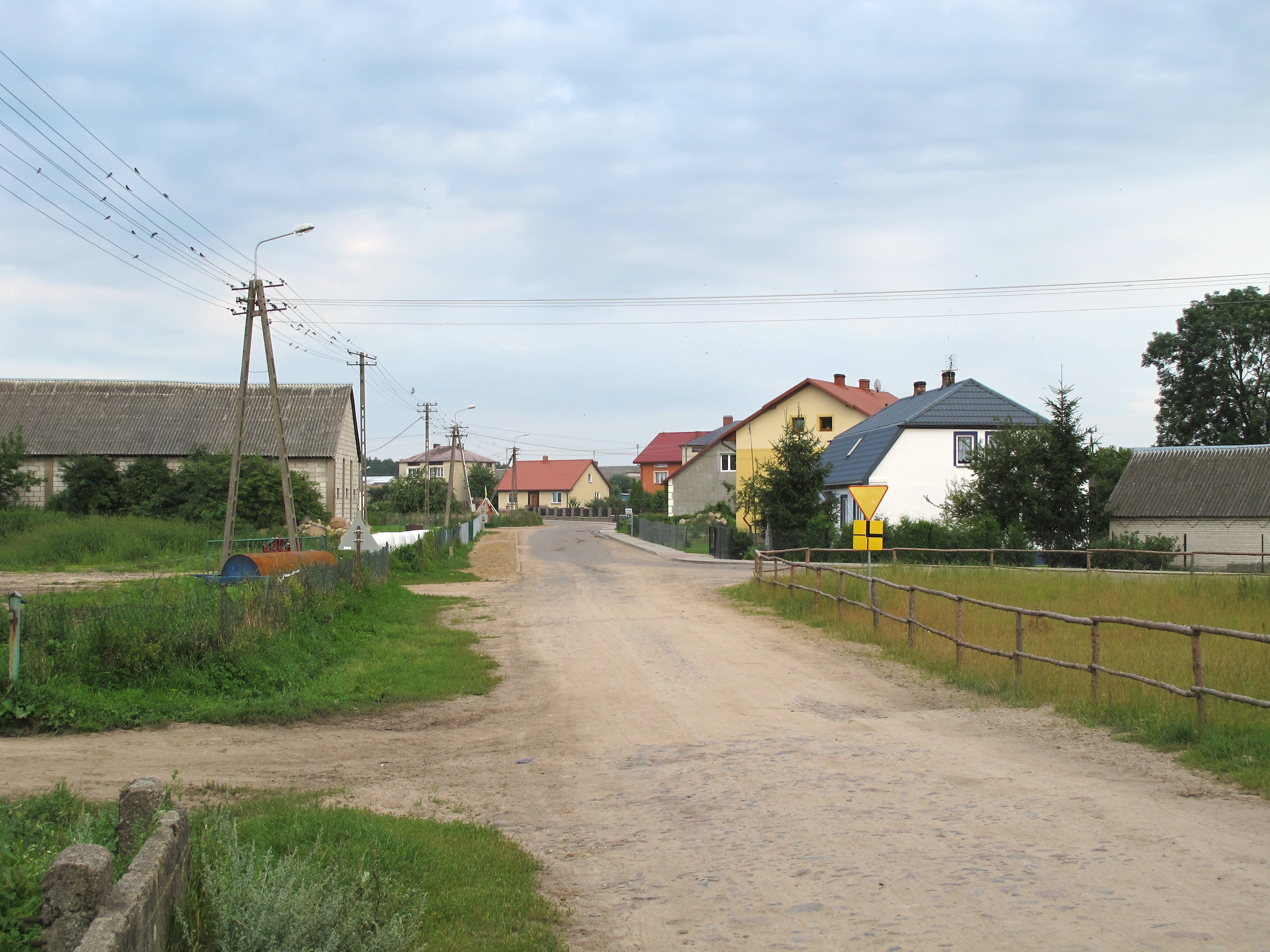
- Houses by the unpaved road in Nowe Chlebiotki

- Location within Poland
- Coordinates: 53°10′01.74″N 22°33′05.09″E
- Country: Poland
- Voivodeship: Podlaskie
- County: Białystok
- Gmina: Zawady

Nowe Chlebiotki [ˈnɔvɛ xlɛˈbjɔtki] is a village in the administrative district of Gmina Zawady, within Białystok County, Podlaskie Voivodeship, in north-eastern Poland.
