= Cibory-Krupy =

- Village
- Location within Poland
- Coordinates: 53°06′06″N 22°34′04″E
- Country: Poland
- Voivodeship: Podlaskie
- County: Białystok
- Gmina: Zawady

Cibory-Krupy [t͡ɕiˈbɔrɨ ˈkrupɨ] is a village in the administrative district of Gmina Zawady, within Białystok County, Podlaskie Voivodeship, in north-eastern Poland.
