= Konopki-Klimki =

- Village
- Location within Poland
- Coordinates: 53°12′06″N 22°29′59″E
- Country: Poland
- Voivodeship: Podlaskie
- County: Białystok
- Gmina: Zawady

Konopki-Klimki [kɔˈnɔpki ˈklimki] is a village in the administrative district of Gmina Zawady, within Białystok County, Podlaskie Voivodeship, in north-eastern Poland.
