= Targonie Wielkie =

- Village
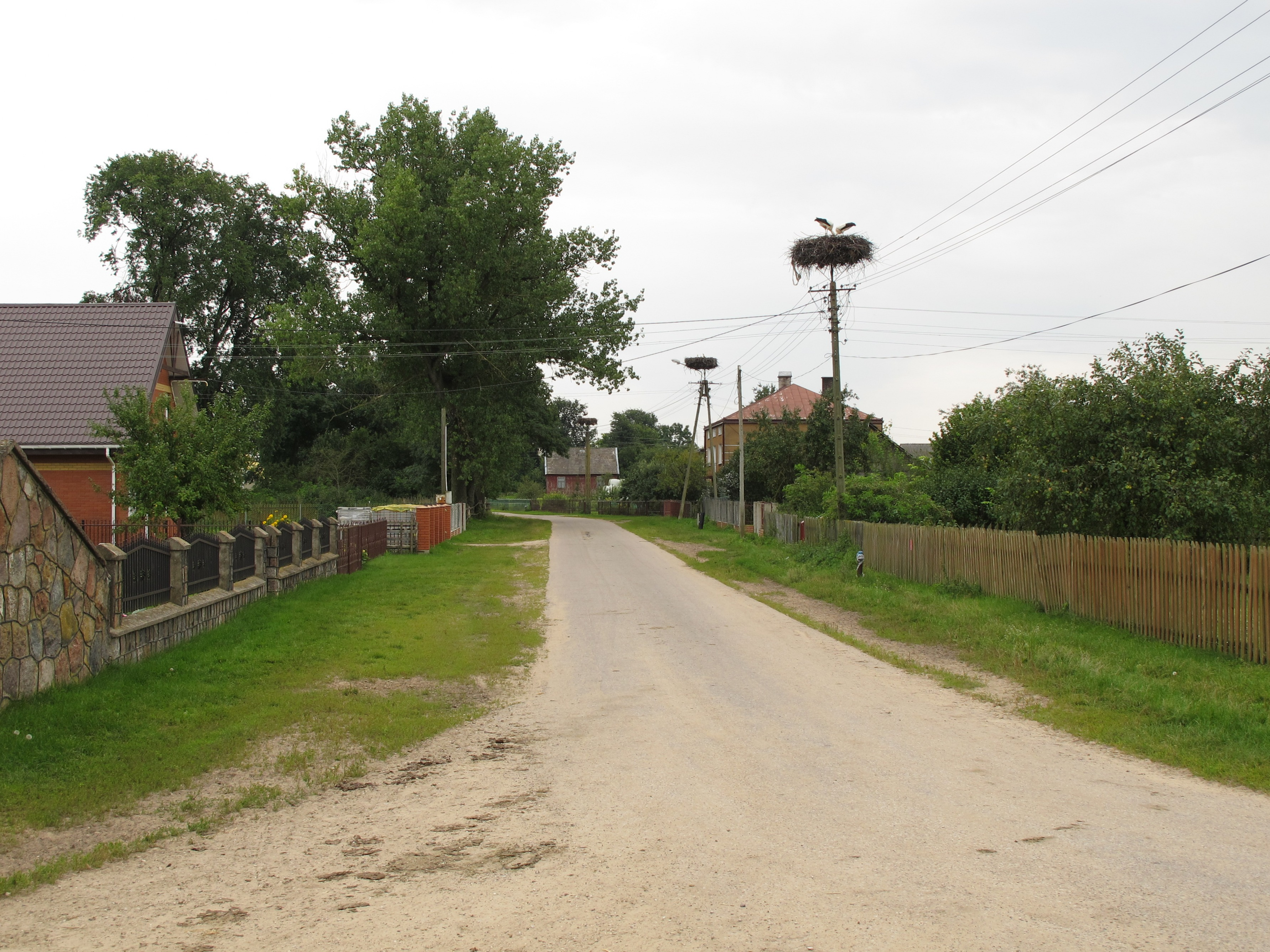

- Location within Poland
- Coordinates: 53°11′N 22°37′E
- Country: Poland
- Voivodeship: Podlaskie
- County: Białystok
- Gmina: Zawady

Targonie Wielkie [tarˈɡɔɲɛ ˈvjɛlkʲɛ] is a village in the administrative district of Gmina Zawady, within Białystok County, Podlaskie Voivodeship, in north-eastern Poland.
