= Özlem Belçim Galip =

Özlem Belçim Galip is a scholar and researcher who obtained a PhD in Kurdish studies from Exeter University. Her work on Kurdish literature has been described as influential.

== Works ==
- Galip, Ö. B. (2012), Kurdistan: A Land of Longing and Struggle: Analysis of ‘Home-land’ and ‘Identity’ in the Kurdish Novelistic Discourse from Turkish Kurdistan to its Diaspora (1984-2010), Ph.D. diss., Exeter: Exeter University.
- Galip, Özlem Belçim (2015). Imagining Kurdistan: Identity, Culture and Society. Bloomsbury Publishing. ISBN 978-0-85772-643-8.
- Galip, Özlem Belçim (2020). New Social Movements and the Armenian Question in Turkey: Civil Society vs. the State. Springer International Publishing. ISBN 978-3-030-59400-8.
