= Nowe Krzewo, Białystok County =

Nowe Krzewo
- Village
- Location within Poland
- Coordinates: 53°06′04″N 22°36′57″E
- Country: Poland
- Voivodeship: Podlaskie
- County: Białystok
- Gmina: Zawady
- Time zone: UTC+1 (CET)
  - Summer (DST): UTC+2 (CEST)
- Vehicle registration: BIA

Nowe Krzewo [ˈnɔvɛ ˈkʂɛvɔ] is a village in the administrative district of Gmina Zawady, within Białystok County, Podlaskie Voivodeship, in north-eastern Poland.

== History ==
Nowe Krzewo, Stare Krzewo and Krzewo-Plebanki were recognized as separate villages already in the 15th century.

During World War II, the village was occupied by the Soviet Union from 1939 to 1941, and by Nazi Germany from 1941 to 1944.
