= Maliszewo-Perkusy =

- Village
- Location within Poland
- Coordinates: 53°12′45″N 22°36′15″E
- Country: Poland
- Voivodeship: Podlaskie
- County: Białystok
- Gmina: Zawady
- Population: 105

Maliszewo-Perkusy [maliˈʂɛvɔ pɛrˈkusɨ] is a village in the administrative district of Gmina Zawady, within Białystok County, Podlaskie Voivodeship, in north-eastern Poland.
