= Institute for Research on Turkish Culture =

The Institute for Research on Turkish Culture (TKAE) is an institution established in 1961. Its research focused on the Turkic world and counted with the support of both the Turkish Ministry of Foreign Affairs and the National Intelligence Organization. It has been described as Nationalist and Pan-Turkist institution.

== Establishment ==
Its origins date back to the 1950s, when an American delegation in Turkey suggested the establishment of a Turkish branch of the Eastern European Institute in Munich. Its aim was to be the research on the Turkic people. In 1960 a commission comprising Ahmet Temir, an Turkilogist born in Kazan, Abidin İtil, an Indologist from Baku and Osman Nedim Tuna, a Turkish linguist of Old Turkic was tasked with preparing the statutes. After they had presented their project to the Ministry of the Interior, it was established in October 1961 as an academic research institution with its publications serving the political right wing as the political establishment at the time worried about a socialist take over. The founding President was Ahmet Temir, Itil became its first director. Membership was initially only reserved to academics with at least a PhD and preferably lecturers in the field. Of the 25 founding members, 15 were of Turkic people out of Turkey (Turkish: dış Türkler) and the others Turkish citizens.

== History ==
After one year, Abidin Idil resigned and Temir succeeded him in 1963 and stayed in the office until 1975. During his tenure, the TKAE had assembled about 10'000 books for its library. In 1968 the TKAE was granted the status of a “society that works for public benefit" which meant it would have some additional privileges. According to its former employee and MIT agent Enver Altaylı, the institute counted with financial support of the MIT during Temirs chairmanship. Following the Military coup in 1980 the Institute aimed at countering the Kurdish insurgency by the Kurdistan Workers Party by publishing books that denied an existence of Kurds.

== Publications ==
The TKAE published from November 1962 onwards three magazines, two in the Turkish language, the third also with articles in French, English and German. The monthly Türk Kültürlü treated contemporary and historical Turkish culture. Issues on countries like Cyprus or Azerbaijan or people like Mustafa Kemal Atatürk and Fuat Köprülü were published. Its first editor was Ahmet Demir. In 1962, on Nationalism and Turkish culture were published the most articles a year later Atatürk came more the focus of the magazine. Articles about the Turkic peoples outside the Turkish republic covered the people in Azerbaijan, Turkmenistan, the Balkans and Kazakhstan with Cyprus becoming a focal point of interest in 1974 after Turkey invaded it.

From 1964 onwards the Türk Kültürü Arastirmali was published, a scholar semi annual magazine focusing of the Turkish language and the Geography.

The third Cultura Turcica one is a semi annual also scholar magazine directed at portraying the Turkish world to the international readership and was published with articles in other languages than Turkish.

=== On Kurds ===
The institute is also known for having published numerous books aimed at proving the Turkish origin of the Kurds.
