= Cibory Gałeckie =

- Village
- Location within Poland
- Coordinates: 53°7′13″N 22°34′4″E
- Country: Poland
- Voivodeship: Podlaskie
- County: Białystok
- Gmina: Zawady

Cibory Gałeckie [t͡ɕiˈbɔrɨ ɡaˈwɛt͡skʲɛ] is a village in the administrative district of Gmina Zawady, within Białystok County, Podlaskie Voivodeship, in north-eastern Poland.
