= Cibory-Witki =

- Village
- Location within Poland
- Coordinates: 53°07′59″N 22°35′48″E
- Country: Poland
- Voivodeship: Podlaskie
- County: Białystok
- Gmina: Zawady

Cibory-Witki [t͡ɕiˈbɔrɨ ˈvitki] is a village in the administrative district of Gmina Zawady, within Białystok County, Podlaskie Voivodeship, in north-eastern Poland.
