= Zawady, Gmina Zawady =

Zawady
- Village
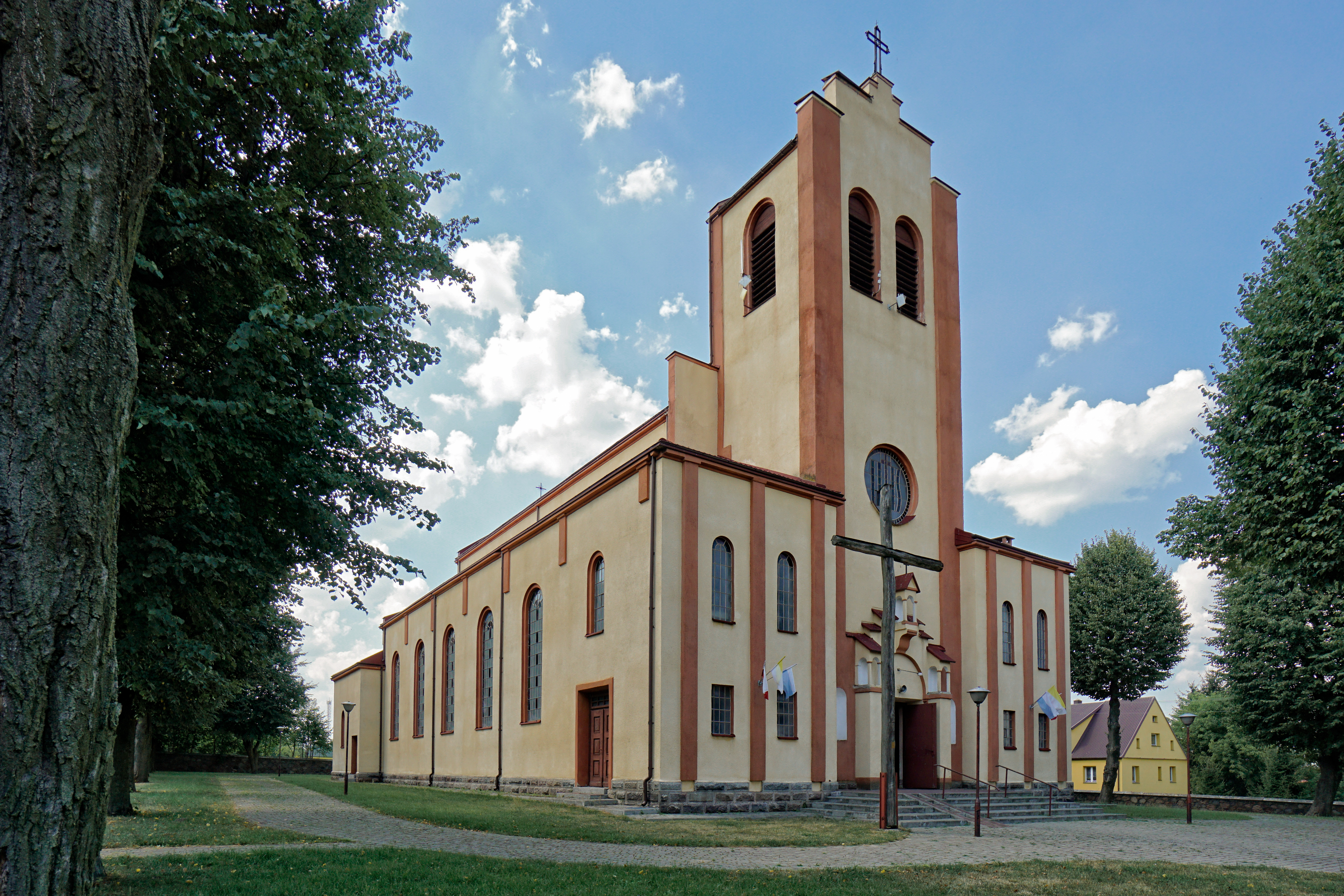
- Church of Transfiguration

- Location within Poland
- Coordinates: 53°9′19″N 22°39′58″E
- Country: Poland
- Voivodeship: Podlaskie
- County: Białystok
- Gmina: Zawady
- Founded: 15th century
- Population: 320
- Time zone: UTC+1 (CET)
  - Summer (DST): UTC+2 (CEST)
- Vehicle registration: BIA

Zawady [zaˈvadɨ] is a village in Białystok County, Podlaskie Voivodeship, in north-eastern Poland. It is the seat of the gmina (administrative district) called Gmina Zawady.

== History ==
Zawady was founded in the early 15th century. By the 16th century, it had a Catholic parish. In 1827, the village had a population of 224.

Following the joint German-Soviet invasion of Poland, which started World War II in September 1939, the village was first occupied by the Soviet Union until 1941, and then by Germany until 1944. On 21 June 1943, a unit of the Uderzeniowe Bataliony Kadrowe Polish resistance organization crushed a German gendarmerie post in Zawady. On 13 July 1943, the Germans pacified the village, murdering 58 Poles from Zawady and Laskowiec at nearby Łysa Góra.
