= Stare Krzewo =

- Village
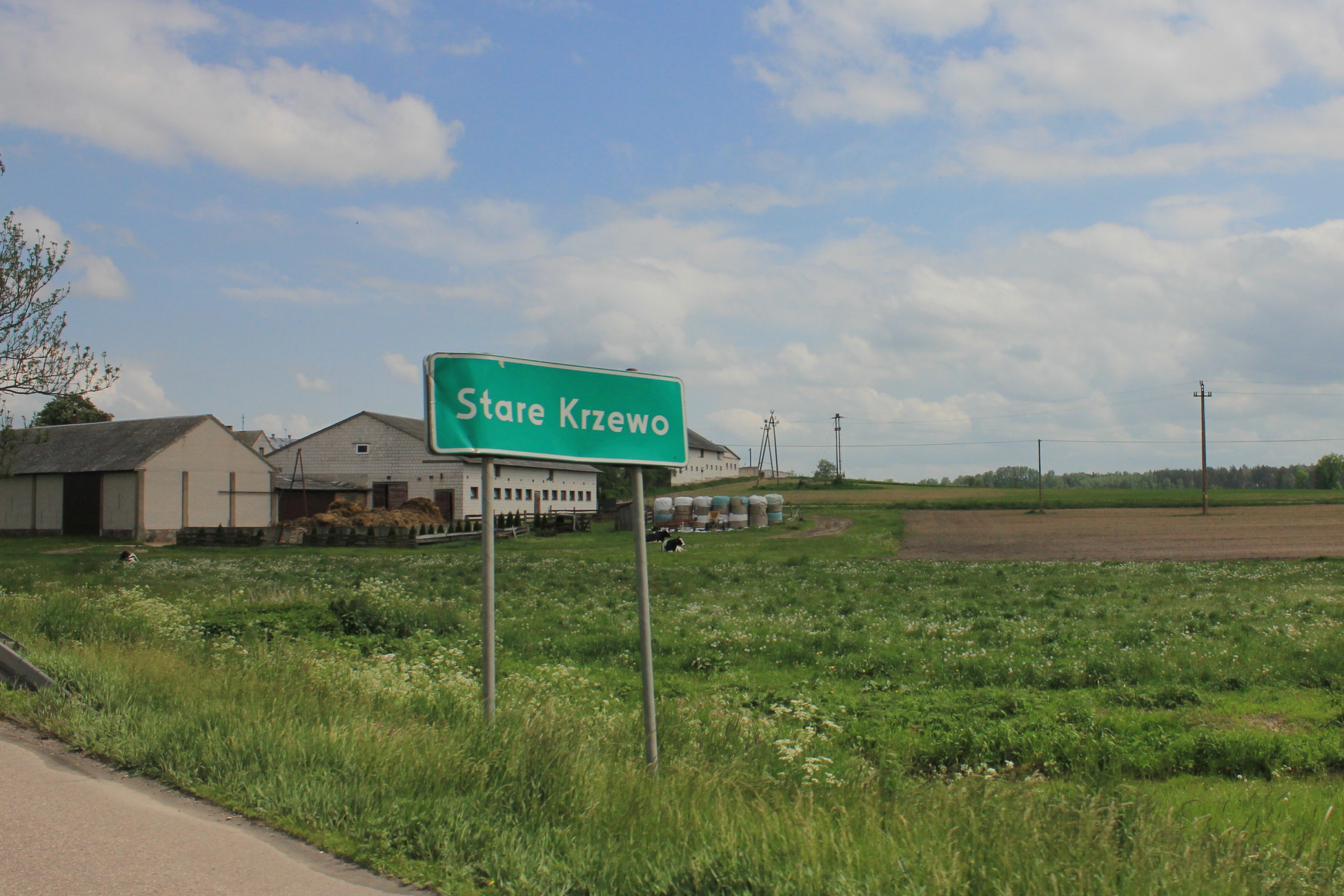
- Entrance sign in Stare Krzewo

- Location within Poland
- Coordinates: 53°6′N 22°36′E
- Country: Poland
- Voivodeship: Podlaskie
- County: Białystok
- Gmina: Zawady
- Time zone: UTC+1 (CET)
  - Summer (DST): UTC+2 (CEST)
- Vehicle registration: BIA

Stare Krzewo [ˈstarɛ ˈkʂɛvɔ] is a village in the administrative district of Gmina Zawady, within Białystok County, Podlaskie Voivodeship, in north-eastern Poland.

== History ==
Stare Krzewo, Nowe Krzewo and Krzewo-Plebanki were recognized as separate villages already in the 15th century.

During World War II, the village was occupied by the Soviet Union from 1939 to 1941, and by Nazi Germany from 1941 to 1944. In 1941, the Germans established a forced labour camp in the village. Around 2,000 Jewish men and women were imprisoned there. The camp was dissolved in 1943, and its prisoners were deported to the Treblinka extermination camp.

== Transport ==
The Expressway S8 passes through the village.
