= Kurpiki =

- Village
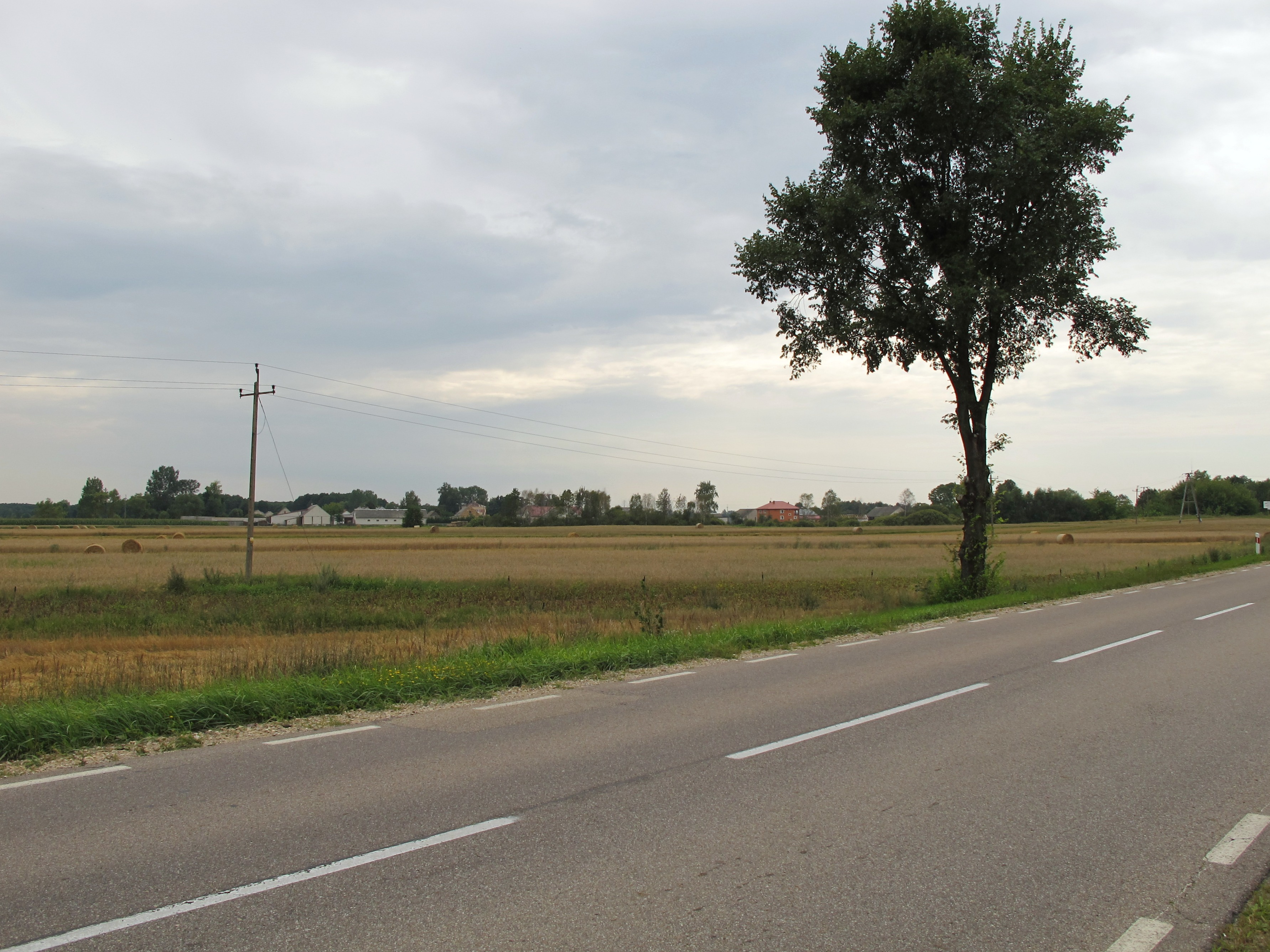
- National road in Kurpiki

- Location within Poland
- Coordinates: 53°12′19.68″N 22°29′33.43″E
- Country: Poland
- Voivodeship: Podlaskie
- County: Białystok
- Gmina: Zawady

Kurpiki [kurˈpiki] is a village in the administrative district of Gmina Zawady, within Białystok County, Podlaskie Voivodeship, in north-eastern Poland.
