= Stare Chlebiotki =

- Village
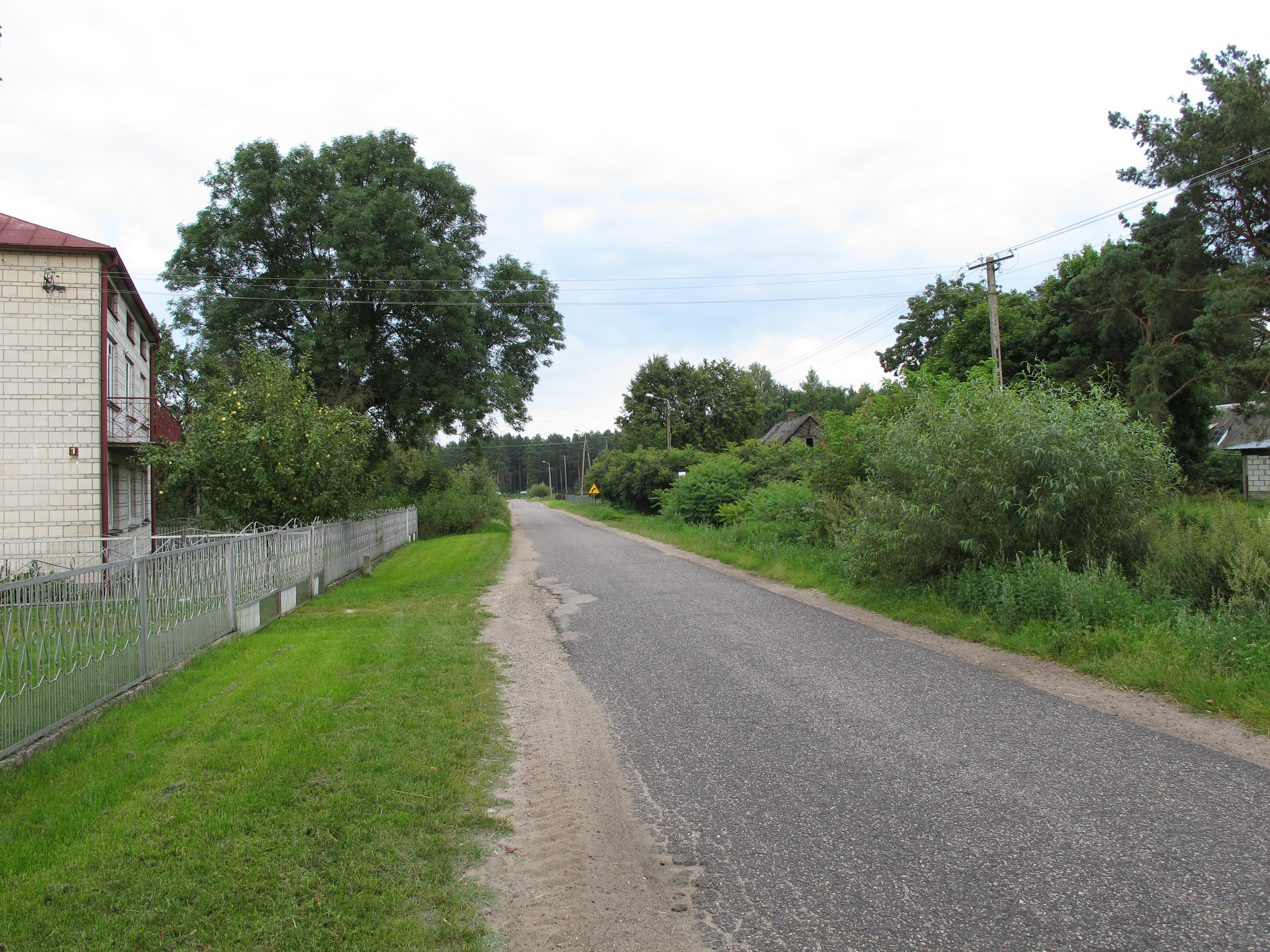

- Location within Poland
- Coordinates: 53°10′04.8″N 22°33′52.21″E
- Country: Poland
- Voivodeship: Podlaskie
- County: Białystok
- Gmina: Zawady

Stare Chlebiotki [ˈstarɛ xlɛˈbjɔtki] is a village in the administrative district of Gmina Zawady, within Białystok County, Podlaskie Voivodeship, in north-eastern Poland.
