= Marylki, Podlaskie Voivodeship =

Marylki
- Settlement
- Location within Poland
- Coordinates: 53°12′15″N 22°36′45″E
- Country: Poland
- Voivodeship: Podlaskie
- County: Białystok
- Gmina: Zawady

Marylki [maˈrɨlki] is a settlement in the administrative district of Gmina Zawady, within Białystok County, Podlaskie Voivodeship, in north-eastern Poland.
