= Zawady-Borysówka =

- Village
- Location within Poland
- Coordinates: 53°08′37″N 22°39′14″E
- Country: Poland
- Voivodeship: Podlaskie
- County: Białystok
- Gmina: Zawady

Zawady-Borysówka [zaˈvadɨ bɔrɨˈsufka] is a village in the administrative district of Gmina Zawady, within Białystok County, Podlaskie Voivodeship, in north-eastern Poland.
