= Enver Altaylı =

Turkish secret agent and politician (born 1944)

Enver Altaylı (born 1944) is a Turkish academic, writer, and former secret agent for the Turkish National Intelligence Organization (MIT).

== Education and early life ==
He was born in Adana in 1944 to a family of Uzbek refugees, and named after Enver Pasha. He was accepted into the Turkish War College from which he and his fellow students were expelled following the failed coup d'état in 1963. Former school principal Colonel Talat Aydemir was identified as one of the individuals involved in plotting the coup.

He later pursued a career as a journalist at the nationalist newspaper Yeni Istanbul. Between 1964 and 1965, he supported the youth branch of the Republican Villagers Nation Party (CKMP) of Alparslan Türkeş. He then worked for the Institute for Research on Turkish Culture before being recruited to the MIT by its then president Fuat Doğu. During his time there, he became close to Ruzi Nazar about whom he later wrote a book. In 1974, he resigned from the MIT and joined the Nationalist Movement Party. He lived in Germany, Azerbaijan and Uzbekistan and served as an advisor to Turkish Presidents Süleyman Demirel and Turgut Özal.

== Legal prosecution ==
In 2017, he was arrested and tried alongside another MIT officer for attempting to orchestrate the latter's escape following dismissal from public service in the purges in the aftermath of the coup d'état attempt of 2016.

In 2021, he was sentenced to ten years imprisonment for terrorism due to his alleged connections to the Gülen Movement, accused of involvement in the coup attempt of 2016, along with an additional 13 years for espionage. He is imprisoned in Sincan prison where he is represented by his daughter, who serves as his lawyer.
