= Cibory-Chrzczony =

- Village
- Location within Poland
- Coordinates: 53°07′25″N 22°35′00″E
- Country: Poland
- Voivodeship: Podlaskie
- County: Białystok
- Gmina: Zawady

Cibory-Chrzczony [t͡ɕiˈbɔrɨ ˈxʂt͡ʂɔnɨ] is a village in the administrative district of Gmina Zawady, within Białystok County, Podlaskie Voivodeship, in north-eastern Poland.
