= İsmail Beşikçi =

Turkish sociologist, philosopher, revolutionist (born 1939)

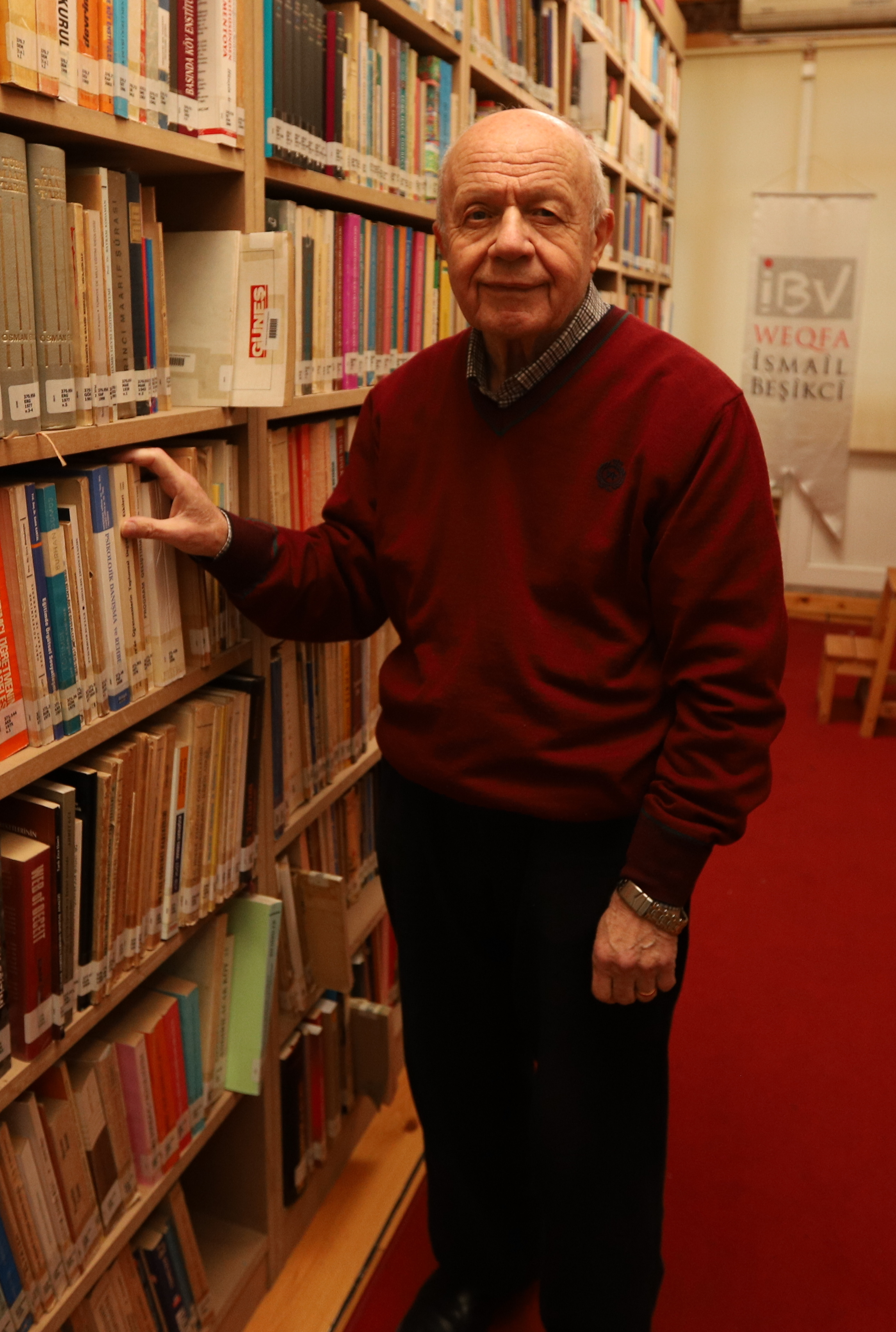
- Born: 1939 (age 86–87); İskilip, Turkey
- Occupations: Sociologist, writer
- Known for: Kurdology
- Honours: International PEN Honorary Member; 1987 Nobel Peace Prize candidate; 2012 Hrant Dink award of the Hrant Dink Foundation; 2014 Person of the Year of Rudaw Media Network

İsmail Beşikçi (born 1939) is a Turkish sociologist, philosopher, revolutionist, and writer. He is a PEN Honorary Member. He has served 17 years in prison on propaganda charges stemming from his writings about the Kurdish population in Middle East.

== Early life and education ==
Beşikçi studied at the Faculty of Political Sciences of Ankara University, and graduated in 1962. After his military duty he became an assistant professor at Atatürk University in Erzurum. He prepared his first anthropological study, an investigation of one of the last nomadic Kurdish tribes, the Alikan, here, which he submitted in 1967 to the Ankara Faculty of Political Sciences. His second encounter with the Kurds was during his military service when he served in Bitlis and Hakkâri where he first saw the nomadic Alikan tribe pass through Bitlis on their migrations from winter to summer meadows and back.

== Professional career ==
His book The Order of Eastern Anatolia: Social-Economic and Ethnic Foundations, first published in 1969, in which he sought to adapt and apply Marxist concepts to the analysis of Kurdish society and to the processes of socio-economic and political change taking place, made him a public enemy. While the book did not cause much debate either in academic or left intellectual circles, the university took disciplinary measures against him which would lead to a trial after the 1971 coup. He was detained and put on trial for communist and anti-national propaganda where he was sentenced to 13 years imprisonment for violating the indivisibility of the Turkish nation. Beşikçi did not have to serve his full 13 years and benefited amnesty in late 1974. He unsuccessfully applied for a position at the Faculty of Political Sciences in Ankara, which in 1970 had appeared willing to employ him. He never found academic employment again and was henceforth working to do his research as an independent scholar in economically precarious circumstances.

=== On Kurds ===
For many years, İsmail Beşikçi was the only non-Kurdish person in Turkey to speak out loud and clearly in defense of the rights of the Kurds. Continuing to write and speak in spite of all attempts to silence him, Beşikçi has become a powerful and important symbol for the Kurds and for the human rights movement of Turkey. He has been described as "modern Turkey's pioneer of Kurdish studies".

Ismail Beşikçi has authored several important works on Kurdish social organization and the continuing plight of Kurds today. His most famous work is International Colony Kurdistan. Beşikçi argues that the Turkish state has been practicing a policy of genocide against Kurds over the past 80 years. International Colony Kurdistan is probably Beşikçi's most open critique of the present division of Kurdistan, an ethnically contiguous area (mainly) between Turkey, Iran and Iraq - with a Kurdish population of several million people. Beşikçi argues that, for all their political differences, there is a longstanding understanding between these regional states to deny Kurds the right of self-determination and nationhood. Ismail Beşikçi's International Colony Kurdistan was originally published in 1991 and led to the imprisonment of the author in Turkey. The book remains a roadmap for our understanding of Kurdistan today.

=== On the Kurdistan Workers' Party ===
He is a prominent opponent of Abdullah Öcalan, the leader of the Kurdistan Workers' Party (PKK), having criticized Öcalan for not supporting the creation of an independent Kurdistan. In 2010 he was again prosecuted, this time by the attorney general of Istanbul for “PKK propaganda” on account of an article on "The rights of the nations to self-determination and the Kurds" that he wrote for the "Association of Contemporary Lawyers".

== Imprisonment ==
He was charged for over 100 years but released from jail in 1999. After writing an article for the Contemporary Lawyer's Association, he was accused in June 2010 of "making propaganda for the PKK" using the Anti-Terror Law of Turkey. In March 2011 he was sentenced to 15 months in prison. He was also convicted under the Anti-Terrorism law for his book Işlevsizleşen Yasaklar- Non functioning Bans.

His publisher, Unsal Ozturk, was prosecuted with him under the Terror Law for the book Nation that Discovered Itself, the Kurds, and at least 18 more of Beşikçi's books.

== Recognition ==
- 1987 candidate for the Nobel Peace Prize.
- 2012 Hrant Dink award of the Hrant Dink Foundation for his research on Kurds and republican era in Turkey
- 2014 Person of the Year of Rudaw Media Network for his contribution to the Kurdish cause.

== Publications ==
32 of the 36 books that he has published have been banned in Turkey. Here a selection of his books

- Nation that Discovered Itself, the Kurds
- Kürdler ve Gelecegini Belirleme Hakki
- Dewlet Û Kurd
- Bilim Yöntemi Türkiye'deki Uygulama-IV - Tunceli Kanunu (1935) ve Dersim Jenosidi
- Beşikçi, İsmail (2015). International Colony Kurdistan. London: Gomidas Institute. ISBN 978-1-909382-20-6.
