= Hamit Bozarslan =

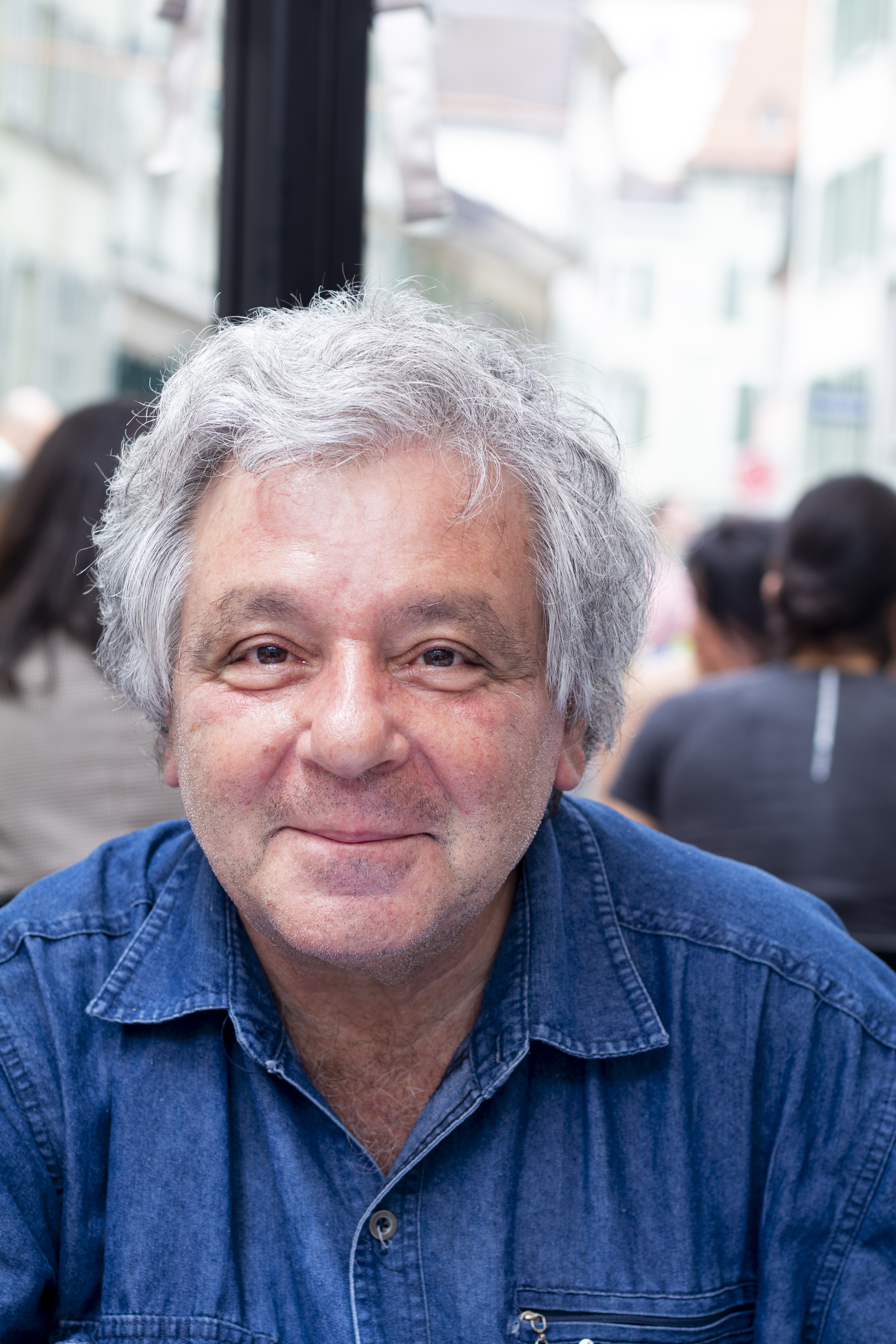
- Born: 11 October 1958; Lice, Turkey
- Education: Sciences Po (doctorat) (1991–1994)
- Occupations: Historian, Political scientist
- Organizations: EHESS; Le Centre Marc Bloch
- Father: Mehmed Emîn Bozarslan

Hamit Bozarslan (born October 11, 1958 in Lice, Turkey) is a political scientist and Kurdish historian. He is known for his work on the Middle East, Turkey and the Kurdish question. He is a director of studies at the École des hautes études en sciences sociales (EHESS) in Paris.

Bozarslan holds doctorates in history and political science from the Institut d'études politiques de Paris. His research focuses on the modern history of the Ottoman Empire and the Middle East. He was a research fellow at the Centre Marc Bloch from 1995 to 1997, and a visiting professor at Princeton University in 1998. He was appointed maître de conférences at the École des hautes études en sciences sociales (EHESS) in 1998. Since 2006, he has been a director of studies at the same institution.

== Views ==
In his 2021 book L'anti-démocratie au XXIe siècle: Iran, Russie, Turquie, Bozarslan compares the political regimes of Iran, Russia, and Turkey as forms of "anti-democracy". The book explores common features including leader cults, radical nationalism, the political mobilization of religion, personalistic patronage and corruption, securitization around internal and external enemies, and the construction of alternative political realities.
