= Margarita Rudenko =

Margarita Borisovna Rudenko (in Russian: Маргарита Борисовна Руденко; 9 May 1926 in Tiflis – 27 July 1976 in Leningrad) (Note: According to the New York Public Library, Rudenko died in 1977.) was a Russian philologist, Orientalist, Kurdologist (specialist in Kurdish language, culture and history), literature researcher and ethnographist. She received her Doctor of Sciences degree in 1954.

== Publications ==
- Opisanie kurdskikh rukopiseĭ leningradskikh sobraniĭ, 1961
- Kurdskie narodnye skazki, 1970
- Kurdskaja obrjadovaja poėzija : pochoronnye pričitanija, 1982
- Literaturnai︠a︡ i folʹklornye versii kurdskoĭ poėmy "I︠U︡suf i Zelikha", 1986

== Sources ==
- (in Russian) Ж. С. Мусаэлян. Маргарита Борисовна Руденко (статья для сайта Санкт-Петербургского Института восточных рукописей Российской Академии Наук, 2001)
