= Cibory-Kołaczki =

- Village
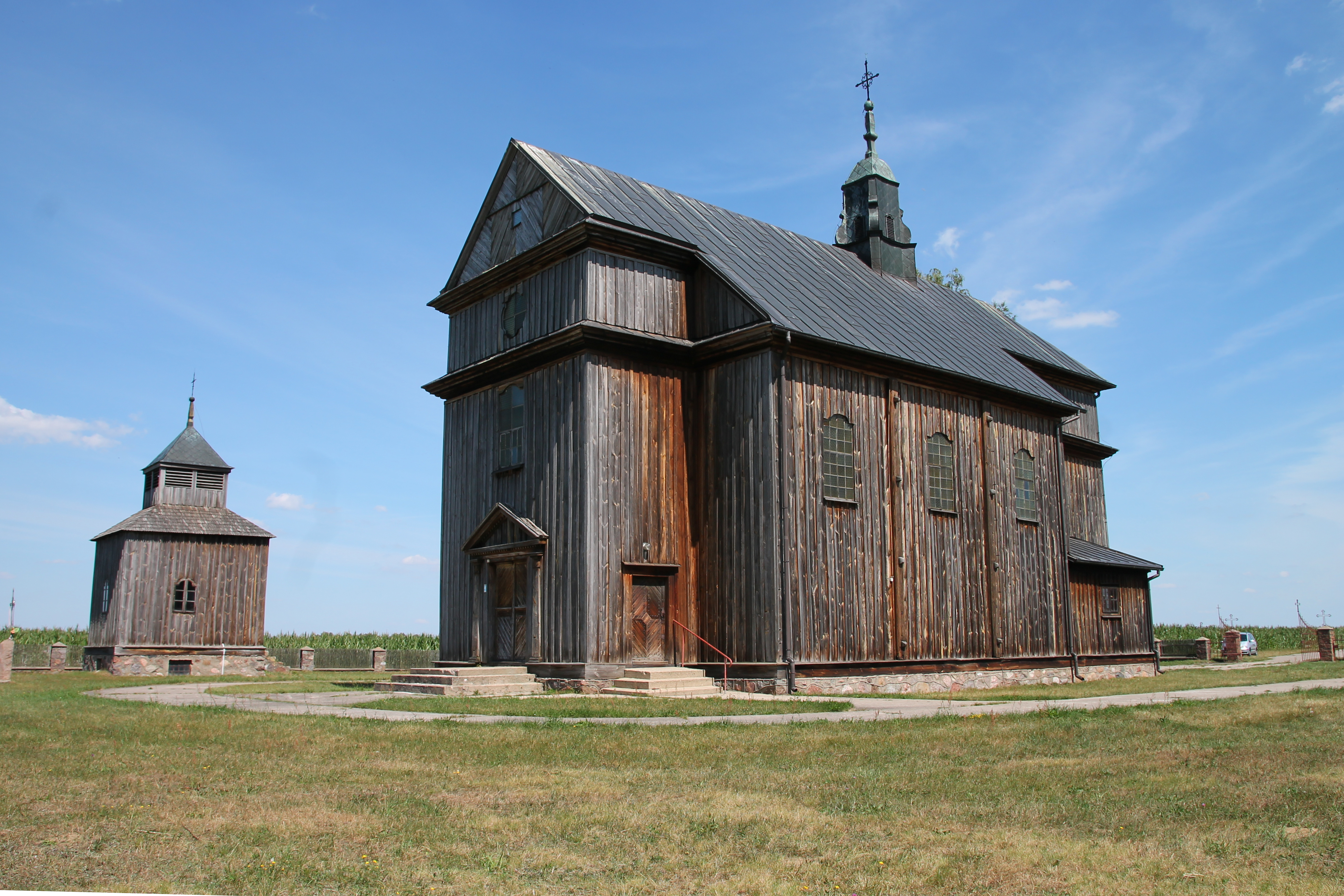
- Church of the Nativity of the Virgin Mary in Cibory-Kołaczki

- Location within Poland
- Coordinates: 53°06′36″N 22°34′54″E
- Country: Poland
- Voivodeship: Podlaskie
- County: Białystok
- Gmina: Zawady

Cibory-Kołaczki [t͡ɕiˈbɔrɨ kɔˈwat͡ʂki] is a village in the administrative district of Gmina Zawady, within Białystok County, Podlaskie Voivodeship, in north-eastern Poland.
