= August Kościesza-Żaba =

Polish diplomat and Orientalist

August Kościesza-Żaba (1801, in Krāslava – 3 January 1894, in İzmir), from coat of arms of Kościesza, was a Polish orientalist and diplomatist in Russian service. He studied Eastern languages in Saint Petersburg, Russia (1824–1828). During 1848–1866, August worked as a translator in Russian consulates in Jaffa and İzmir and as a consul in Erzurum.

August Kościesza-Żaba was researching habits, literature and language of Kurdish people and in 1861, published results in French language paper Receueil des notices et récits de la littérature et des tribus du Kourdistan. He is also an author of Dictionnaire kurde-français, the first French-Kurdish dictionary (1879).
