= Martin van Bruinessen =

Dutch anthropologist and author

Martin van Bruinessen (born 1946) is a Dutch anthropologist and author, who has published a number of publications on the Kurdish, Indonesian, Turkish, Persian cultures, and also on aspects of Islam as a whole.

== Biography ==
Bruinessen graduated from Utrecht University with a degree in theoretical physics and mathematics in 1971. He then studied social anthropology and conducted fieldwork in the Kurdish areas of Iran, Iraq, Turkey, and Syria between 1974 and 1976, which led to his PhD dissertation on Agha, Shaikh and State: On the Social and Political Organization of Kurdistan, defended at Utrecht University in 1978. He travelled extensively in Turkey, Iran and Afghanistan between 1978 and 1981, and worked on a village development project in the latter country. From 1982, he focused his research on Indonesia, returning occasionally to the Kurdish areas.

He taught the sociology of religion at the State Institute of Islamic Studies of Yogyakarta in Indonesia. He has lectured in Kurdish and Turkish studies at Utrecht University in the Netherlands as associate professor since 1994. With his appointment as professor of the comparative study of contemporary Muslim societies in 1998, he shifted his attention to the broader field of Islamic studies.

He was additionally active as an Ottomanist and researched the early stages of Islam in Java.
