= Kurdology =

Academic discipline

Kurdology or Kurdish studies is an academic discipline centered on the study of Kurds and consists of several disciplines such as culture, history and linguistics. Kurdish studies traces its institutional history to 1916, when in St. Petersburg in the late Russian Empire, during World War I, Kurdology was first taught as a university course by Joseph Orbeli.

== Term ==
The modern historian Sacha Alsancakli explains that the term Kurdology started gaining acceptance after 1934, when the first pan-Soviet Kurdological congress was held in Yerevan, Armenian SSR, Soviet Union.

== Early Kurdology ==
Throughout the 17th and the 18th centuries, most works on the Kurds attempted to ascertain the origins of the Kurdish people and their language. Different theories existed including the beliefs that Kurdish was closely related to Turkic languages, that it was a rude and uneducated Persian dialect or that Kurds were originally Armenians.

Early Kurdology is characterized by the lack of an institutionalized approach and tended to lack critical contextualization. In a sanctioned trip by Russian Academy of Sciences from 1768 to 1774, naturalist Johann Anton Güldenstädt travelled to the southern border of the Russian Empire to explore the Caucasus and the Kurds in Georgia. In his travel notes published between 1787 and 1791, Güldenstädt erroneously claimed that Kurds were Tatars and his translations also had inaccuracies because of communication issues with his informants. His claim that Kurdish was related to Turkic languages was nevertheless rejected by German librarian Johann Adelung who argued that Kurds were related to Corduene basing his argument on Xenophon and his work Anabasis from around 370 BC.

The Spanish Jesuit Lorenzo Hervás y Panduro also examined the Kurdish language in his Vocabolario poligloto (transl. Polyglot Vocabulary) in 1787 and argued that:

the Kurdistani (il Curdistano) is more akin to Persian than Turkish; so much so that among a hundred Kurdistani words (parole Curdistane) only fifteen bear similarity to their Turkish counterpart, and thirty-five to the Persian; it seems to me that the Kurdistani words are closer than both Turkish and Persian to the primitive Tatar idiom.

== Kurdology by region ==
=== Italy ===
Kurds became known for the first time in Europe through Dominican Order. In the beginning, it was Italians who carried out research on the Kurds on behalf of the Vatican. A monk, Domenico Lanza, lived between 1753 and 1771 near Mosul and published a book titled Compendiose realizione istorica dei viaggi fatti dal Padre Domenico Lanza dell'Ordine dei Predicatori de Roma in Oriente dall'anno 1753 al 1771. The missionary and traveler Maurizio Garzoni spent 20 years with the Kurds of Amadiya and Mosul and wrote an Italian-Kurdish dictionary with around 4,500 words between 1764 and 1770. This work was published in Rome in 1787 under the name Grammatica e Vocabolario della Lingua Kurdi. With the growing interest in Europe about the Ottoman Empire, other people became aware of the Kurds. Garzoni's book was reissued in 1826. The first European book dealing with the religion of the Kurds appeared in Naples in 1818. It was called Storia della regione Kurdistan e delle sette di religio ivi esistenti and was written by Giuseppe Campanile. The Italian missionary and researcher Alessandro de Bianchi published in 1863 a book on Kurdish culture, traditions and history.

=== Germany ===
The earliest mention of the Kurds in a German work comes from Johann Schitberger from the year 1473. In 1799, Johann Adam Bergk also mentions Kurds in his geography book. During his stay in the Ottoman Empire, Helmuth von Moltke reported about Kurds in his work letters about the events in Turkey. The Kurds were also mentioned in the German literature, the most prominent example being Karl May's in 1892 published Durchs wilde Kurdistan.

The period from 1840 to 1930 was the most productive period of Kurdology in Germany. Germany was at the time the center of Kurdish studies in Europe. Due to its good relations with the Ottoman Empire, German researchers were able to access to the Ottoman lands and its inhabitants with relative ease.

At the present time Humboldt University of Berlin, University of Vienna, University of Göttingen, University of Erfurt and Free University of Berlin offer Kurdish oriented courses in Germany, either as a sole study or as a part of wider Iranian studies.

=== Russia ===
During its expansion Russia also was in contact with the Ottoman Empire, that often resulted in conflicts. Russia's access to Black Sea and the Caucasus brought the country in contact with eastern part of the Ottoman Empire, where they then began their research on the Kurds. In 1879 Russian-Polish diplomat from Erzurum August Kościesza-Żaba published a Franco-Kurdish dictionary with the help of Mahmud Bayazidi. The center of Kurdish studies was the University of St. Petersburg. Żaba and other diplomats like Basil Nikitin collected Kurdish manuscripts and recorded oral histories. Among other things, the Sharafnama was translated into Russian for the first time.

=== Turkey ===
Due to the Turkish state policy, the Kurdish people and their culture were not deemed as a research topic for decades. Some early works on Kurds, such as by Fahrettin Kırzıoğlu, portrayed the Kurds as a Turkic or Turanian population group and were consistent with the state backed Turkish History Thesis. First studies that deviated from the state view were published by İsmail Beşikçi. It was only after the relaxation of Turkish-Kurdish relations that academic papers on the Kurds appeared. At the Mardin Artuklu Üniversitesi, which was founded in 2007, a chair for Kurdish language and literature was established as a part of the Institute of Living Languages.

== Notable academics ==
- Maurizio Garzoni (1730–1790)
- Johann Christoph Adelung (1732–1806)
- Lorenzo Hervás y Panduro (1735–1809)
- Peter Simon Pallas (1741–1811)
- Johann Anton Güldenstädt (1745–1781)
- Giuseppe Campanile (1762–1835)
- Julius Klaproth (1783–1835)
- François Bernard Charmoy (1793–1869)
- August Kościesza-Żaba (1801–1894)
- Aleksander Chodźko (1804–1891)
- Ilya Berezin (1818–1896)
- Peter Lerch (1828–1884)
- Ferdinand Justi (1837–1907)
- Albert Socin (1844–1899)
- Nikolai Jakowlewitsch Marr (1865−1934)
- Ely Bannister Soane (1881–1923)
- Basil Nikitin (1885–1960)
- Celadet Alî Bedirxan (1893–1951)
- Arab Shamilov (1897–1978)
- Emînê Evdal (1906–1964)
- Heciyê Cindî (1908–1990)
- Roger Lescot (1914–1975)
- Mohammad Mokri (1921–2007)
- Margarita Borissowna Rudenko (1926–1976)
- Celile Celil (1936–)
- İsmail Beşikçi (1936–)
- Martin van Bruinessen (1946–)
- Mehmet Bayrak (1948–)
- Michael M. Gunter

== See also ==
- Iranian studies
- A Modern History of the Kurds by David McDowall
