= Kurdish typography =

Kurdish Wikipedia

The Central Kurdish variety Sorani is mainly written using an Arabic alphabet with 33 letters. Unlike the regular Arabic script, which is an abjad, Kurdish Arabic is an alphabet in which vowels are mandatory.

== Table of Unicode characters used in Kurdish-Arabic script ==
Arabic	Unicode name (Arabic letters)	Hex.
ئ	Yeh with Hamza above	0626
ا	Alef	0627
ب	Beh	0628
پ	Peh	067E
ت	Teh	062A
ج	Jeem	062C
چ	Tcheh	0686
ح	Hah	062D
خ	Khah	062E
د	Dal	062F
ر	Reh	0631
ڕ	Reh with small V below	0695
ز	Zain	0632
ژ	Jeh	0698
س	Seen	0633
ش	Sheen	0634
ع	Ain	0639
غ	Ghain	063A
ف	Feh	0641
ڤ	Veh	06A4
ق	Qaf	0642
ک	Keheh	06A9
ك	Kaf	0643
گ	Gaf	06AF
ل	Lam	0644
ڵ	Lam with small V	06B5
م	Meem	0645
ن	Noon	0646
و	Waw	0648
ۆ	Oe	06C6
ۇ	U	06C7
ۊ	Waw with two dots above	06CA
ھ	Heh Doachashmee	06BE
ه	Heh	0647
ە	Ae	06D5
ی	Farsi Yeh	06CC
ێ	Yeh with small V	06CE

Non-letter characters in addition to punctuation marks and symbols are:

- Tatweel (U+0640), used to stretch characters.
- Zero width non-joiner (U+200C). Usage of the ZWNJ is non-standard but occurs a lot, most of the time this is due to poor conversions from non-Unicode to Unicode mapping in texts.

== Kurdish Unicode fonts ==
Font pack	Names of fonts	Link
with Microsoft Windows	Arabic Transparent; Arabic Typesetting; Arial; Courier New; Microsoft sans Serif; Microsoft Uighur; Tahoma; Times New Roman	
X Series 2 fonts	XB Zar; XB Yagut; XB Riyaz; XB Roya; XB Shafigh; XB Shafigh Kurd; XB Shafigh Uzbek; XB Shiraz; XB Sols; XB Tabriz; XB Titre; XM Traffic; XM Vahid; XP Vosta; XM Yermook; XB Yas; XP Ziba	by Iranian Mac User Group – X Series 2 Download Page, built on freely available fonts and extended to support Persian, Arabic, Urdu, Pashto, Dari, Uzbek, Kurdish, Uighur, old Turkish (Ottoman) and modern Turkish (Roman) and equipped with two font technologies, AAT and OpenType. Can be used on any platform; Mac, Windows or Linux.: Note: XB Shafigh Kurd automatically adds a ئ (Yeh with Hamza above) before vowels. It seems fine while you're using this font, but since there aren't any actual ئs in the text, you have to add them when you switch fonts.
Unikurd fonts	Unikurd Chimen; Unikurd Digital; Unikurd Ezmer; Unikurd Goran; Unikurd Hana; Unikurd Hejar; Unikurd Hemen; Unikurd Hiwa; Unikurd Jino; Unikurd Kale; Unikurd Kamran; Unikurd Kawe; Unikurd Koch; Unikurd Magroon; Unikurd Mestan; Unikurd Midya; Unikurd Nali; Unikurd Nasko; Unikurd Penos; Unikurd Peshiw; Unikurd Qandil; Unikurd Rawanduz; Unikurd Reyhan; Unikurd Roonak; Unikurd Seyran; Unikurd Shilan; Unikurd Siber; Unikurd Sirwan; Unikurd Tewar; Unikurd Tishk; Unikurd Web; Unikurd Xani; Unikurd Xatoon; Unikurd Xezal; Unikurd Yadgar	suited by Kurd IT group – Download Page
Nefel fonts	A_Nefel_Adetî; A_Nefel_Adetî_Qelew; A_Nefel_Botan; A_Nefel_Sereke; A_Nefel_Sereke_Qelew	suited by Nefel – Download Page
ABD fonts	43 ABD Fonts	suited by eDuhok.net – Download Page
SIL International	Scheherazade; Lateef	created by SIL International – Download Page
PakType	PakType Naqsh; PakType NaskhBasic; PakType Tehreer	PakType – Pakistani Typography
Droid	Droid Arabic Naskh	Google font directory, FFonts
Bahij	72 Bahij Fonts	Bahij Virtual Academy - Kurdish Standard Fonts
Sarchia	100 Sarchia Fonts	suited by Sarchia Khursheed – Download Page

== Non-Unicode fonts ==
=== Ali fonts ===
Alifonts, widely used with Windows 98, enabled typing of Kurdish with Arabic or Farsi keyboard layouts. While it uses a non-standard mapping, typing Kurdish with Alifonts remains popular, as it does not require a specific Kurdish keyboard layout.

=== Ribaz fonts ===
Ribaz Font, 99 non-Unicode fonts suited from Arabic fonts. file

=== Zanest fonts ===
Download zanest fonts 1994

=== Converting to Unicode ===
- http://www.transliteration.kpr.eu/ku/en.html Kurdî Nûs], a versatile tool for converting to Unicode and Kurdish Latin by pellk Software Development Institute.
- KurdITGroup's font converter, for converting non-Unicode fonts to Unicode.

Beware: Some old converters convert Teh Marbuta (0629) to Heh + ZWNJ (0647 200C) instead of the correct Ae (06D5)!

Most converters don't retain formatting through non-joiners and therefore give a slightly different, albeit more standard, rendering.

== Web fonts ==
- Unikurd Web: for 10, 11 and 12 pt
- Tahoma & Tahoma Bold
- Times New Roman
- Arial

== See also ==
- Kurdish alphabet
