= Yezidi (Unicode block) =

- Range: U+10E80..U+10EBF (64 code points)
- Plane: SMP
- Scripts: Yezidi
- Assigned: 47 code points
- Unused: 17 reserved code points

Unicode version history
- 13.0 (2020): 47 (+47)

Unicode documentation
- Code chart ∣ Web page

Yezidi is a Unicode block containing characters from the Yezidi script, which was used for writing Kurdish, specifically the Kurmanji dialect (Northern Kurdish) for liturgical purposes in Iraq and Georgia.

== Block ==
Yezidi^{[1]}^{[2]} Official Unicode Consortium code chart (PDF)
	0	1	2	3	4	5	6	7	8	9	A	B	C	D	E	F
U+10E8x	𐺀	𐺁	𐺂	𐺃	𐺄	𐺅	𐺆	𐺇	𐺈	𐺉	𐺊	𐺋	𐺌	𐺍	𐺎	𐺏
U+10E9x	𐺐	𐺑	𐺒	𐺓	𐺔	𐺕	𐺖	𐺗	𐺘	𐺙	𐺚	𐺛	𐺜	𐺝	𐺞	𐺟
U+10EAx	𐺠	𐺡	𐺢	𐺣	𐺤	𐺥	𐺦	𐺧	𐺨	𐺩		𐺫	𐺬	𐺭		
U+10EBx	𐺰	𐺱														
Notes: 1. As of Unicode version 16.0; 2. Grey areas indicate non-assigned code points

== History ==
The following Unicode-related documents record the purpose and process of defining specific characters in the Yezidi block:

Version	Final code points (Note: Proposed code points and characters names may differ from final code points and names)	Count	L2 ID	WG2 ID	Document
13.0	U+10E80..10EA9, 10EAB..10EAD, 10EB0..10EB1	47	L2/18-238		Karaca, Erdal; Pirbari, Dimitri; Rovenchak, Andrij (2018-05-25), Preliminary proposal for encoding the Yezidi script in the SMP
13.0	U+10E80..10EA9, 10EAB..10EAD, 10EB0..10EB1	47	L2/18-241		Anderson, Deborah; et al. (2018-07-25), "5", Recommendations to UTC # 156 July 2018 on Script Proposals
13.0	U+10E80..10EA9, 10EAB..10EAD, 10EB0..10EB1	47	L2/18-284		Karaca, Erdal; Pirbari, Dimitri; Rovenchak, Andrij (2018-08-20), Preliminary proposal for encoding the Yezidi script
13.0	U+10E80..10EA9, 10EAB..10EAD, 10EB0..10EB1	47	L2/18-300		Anderson, Deborah; et al. (2018-09-14), "5", Recommendations to UTC #157 on Script Proposals
13.0	U+10E80..10EA9, 10EAB..10EAD, 10EB0..10EB1	47	L2/19-051R	N5053	Rovenchak, Andrij; Pirbari, Dimitri; Karaca, Erdal (2019-03-11), Proposal for encoding the Yezidi script in the SMP of the UCS
13.0	U+10E80..10EA9, 10EAB..10EAD, 10EB0..10EB1	47	L2/19-047		Anderson, Deborah; et al. (2019-01-13), "5", Recommendations to UTC #158 January 2019 on Script Proposals
13.0	U+10E80..10EA9, 10EAB..10EAD, 10EB0..10EB1	47	L2/19-164		Rovenchak, Andrij (2019-01-29), Information on Yezidi UUM and hamza
13.0	U+10E80..10EA9, 10EAB..10EAD, 10EB0..10EB1	47	L2/19-173		Anderson, Deborah; et al. (2019-04-29), "9", Recommendations to UTC #159 April-May 2019 on Script Proposals
13.0	U+10E80..10EA9, 10EAB..10EAD, 10EB0..10EB1	47	L2/19-122		Moore, Lisa (2019-05-08), "C.5", UTC #159 Minutes
13.0	U+10E80..10EA9, 10EAB..10EAD, 10EB0..10EB1	47		N5122	"M68.03", Unconfirmed minutes of WG 2 meeting 68, 2019-12-31
