= Bimus =

Language-learning app for Kurdish

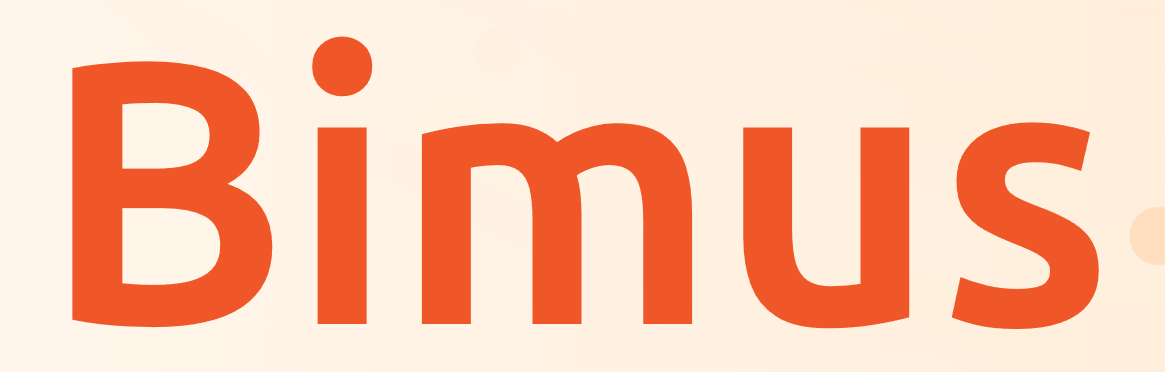
- Developers: Ma'z Êst; Hamza Çelik
- Release: June 2025; 1 year ago
- Operating system: iOS, Android
- Available in: Kurdish (Kurmanji, Sorani, Zazaki), Turkish, French, Arabic, German, English
- Type: Language education, Educational software
- Website: bimusapp.com

Bimus (Kirmanjki: to learn) is a language learning application designed for teaching the Kurdish language and its dialects, including Kurmanji, Sorani, and Zazaki. Launched in June 2025 by the Ma'z Êst Community, it is considered the first comprehensive digital application dedicated to learning Kurdish.

== Development ==
The application's technical infrastructure was developed over the course of a year by Hamza Çelik, a 19-year-old economics student at Metz University. The project was created by the Ma'z Êst Community, a preservation group and magazine publisher that focuses on the development of the written language of Zazaki.

Founder Abdullah Çelik views the app as a strategic tool for language preservation. Following its release, Bimus experienced rapid growth, reaching over 65,000 downloads shortly after launch.

== Features ==
Bimus uses a gamified learning system similar to other popular language apps, offering interactive lessons, games, and speaking exercises. At launch, the application supported the instruction of the Kurmanji, Sorani, and Zazaki dialects. Users can learn these dialects through five different instruction languages: Turkish, French, Arabic, German, and English. The developers have stated plans to introduce additional dialects and an online dictionary in the future.

== Status of Kurdish ==
For decades, the Kurdish language in Turkey has faced strict assimilation policies, including heavy fines for speaking it in public during the early Republican era, and outright bans on its use and publication following the 1980 Turkish coup d'état. Although some restrictions were eased in the 2000s and 2010s, with the introduction of limited elective courses in public schools, Kurdish remains largely excluded from the formal education system due to constitutional hurdles, such as Article 42 of the Constitution of Turkey, which prohibits teaching any language other than Turkish as a mother tongue.

Bimus aims to help protect the Zazaki (Kirmanckî) dialect, which UNESCO has classified as an endangered language. Ma'z Êst founder Abdullah Çelik stated that his work aims to refute the politically charged thesis that "Zazas are not Kurds". By firmly integrating Zazaki alongside Kurmanji and Sorani, the app deliberately positions Zazaki as an integral Kurdish dialect, aligning with the developers' mission to combat language loss and encourage the speaking of Kurdish in households.
