= Hewlêrî Kurdish =

Dialect of Kurdish

Hewlêrî
- Hawleri, Arbili
- هەولێری
- Native to: Kurdistan Region, Iraq
- Region: Erbil
- Ethnicity: Kurds
- Language family: Indo-European: Indo-Iranian; Iranian; Western; Northwestern; Kurdish; Central Kurdish; Hewlêrî

Language codes
- ISO 639-3: –
- Glottolog: hewl1238

Hewlêrî Kurdish or Hawleri (Kurdish: Hewlêrî, هەولێری) is a regional dialect of Kurdish spoken primarily in Erbil, the capital of the Kurdistan Region, and in some of its surrounding areas. Hewlêrî has many characteristics that distinguish it from other Kurdish dialects.

== Pronunciation and Phonology ==
Differing from standard Central Kurdish, Hewlêrî displays several noteworthy phonetic differences. One prominent contrast is observed in the pronunciation of the letter "ڵ/ll". While in most Central Kurdish dialects, this sound is pronounced as /ɫ/, in Hewlêrî it is typically pronounced as /ɾ/ or /l/.

In the Hewlêrî Kurdish spoken in Erbil, further phonetic changes are evident. Notably, there's a shift observed from "û" to "î" and "w" to "f". For instance, "șûtî" transforms into "şiftî," while "mizgewt" changes to "mizgeft." These phonetic alterations are commonly found in both Hewlêrî and the Kurmanji dialect.

== Grammar and Syntax ==
Apart from its phonetic distinctions, the subdialect encompasses several unique grammatical and syntactic characteristics. Unlike standard Sorani but similar to Kurmanji, Hewlêrî Kurdish employs oblique case and utilizes different personal pronouns. Another feature of the dialect is the use of the suffix "ek/ەک" instead of the standard "êk\ێک."

Personal Pronouns
Hewlêrî	Sorani	Kurmanji
emin [I]	min	ez
etu [you]	to	tu
ew [they]	ew	ew
eme [we]	ême	em
engo [you]	êwe	hingo

Pronouns in the oblique case
Hewlêrî	Sorani	Kurmanji
min		min
tu		te
wî		wî/wê
me		me
ngo		we

== Influence and Usage ==
Hewlêrî serves as the primary dialect in Erbil, spoken not only by its Kurdish inhabitants but also by other ethnic communities residing in the city, including Turkmen and Assyrians. Furthermore, the increasing prevalence of the dialect has had an impact on shaping the standard Sorani dialect.
