= Kurdish grammar =

Grammar of the Kurdish language

Kurdish grammar has many inflections, with prefixes and suffixes added to roots to express grammatical relations and to form words.

== Split-ergative system ==
Among all modern Iranian languages, only Yaghnobi and Kurdish are ergative, with respect to both case-marking and verb-agreement. There are general descriptions of ergativity in Kurdish, as well as in specific forms of Kurdish, such as Sorani and Kurmanji.

Kurmanji and Sorani Kurdish have a split-ergative system. Transitive verbs show nominative/accusative marking in the present tense, and ergative marking in the past tense.

== Nouns ==
=== Summary ===
- A Kurdish noun in the absolute state, in other words without any ending of any kind, gives a generic sense of the noun.
- It is also the citation form of the noun, i.e. the form in which a noun is given in a vocabulary list or dictionary.
- Nouns in Kurmanji are declined in four cases: nominative, oblique, construct (or ezafe) and vocative. The distinction of nominative and oblique doesn't exist in Sorani.
- Nouns in Sorani can be simple or compound.
- Any unmodified noun in Kurdish may be generic, i.e., it can refer to one or more than one items. Plural is not obligatory when more than one item are implied.
- For most in Sorani nouns the plural is formed through adding a suffix, some are formed through irregular endings. For Kurmanji, nominative plural is marked by verbs.
- Kurmanji has a paucal number for a few of something, represented by the infix -in-.
- There are 3 grammatical genders in Kurmanji: feminine, masculine and neuter. Sorani has no grammatical gender. Languages like Zazaki and Hawramani have likewise 3 grammatical genders.
- In Kurmanji, as in many other Indo-European languages, the assignment of noun genders often seems arbitrary and must be memorized by word. However, all nouns derived from infinitives, names of settlements (including countries), nouns being female by nature, and nouns ending in -î are always feminine. These genders also have distinct case endings.
- Definiteness is not formally marked in Kurmanji. In Sorani nouns may be marked with a definite marker (-eke) or an indefinite marker (-êk).
- Adjectives agree with the nouns they modify in number and case.
- Personal pronouns are marked for number and person (1st, 2nd, 3rd). They can be free-standing or take the form of clitics. Free-standing forms are used for emphasis.

Kurmanji
	Sing. M.	Sing. F	Pauc.	Plur.
Oblique	-î	-ê	-inan	-an
Construct	-ê	-a	-inên/inêt	-ên/êt
Vocative	-o	-ê	-inno/inine	-no/ine

Sorani
	Sing.	Plur.
Indefinite	-êk-	
Definite	-eke-	-ekan

=== Possession ===
Ezafe is used with nouns to indicate possession. Ezafe (-y) joins the possessive noun with its possessed noun

jēgā-y pāsā = the king's place (Lit: place of king)

Ezafe is also used alongside pronouns to show possession. Ezafe (-y) joins the possessor pronoun with its possessed noun.

jēgā-y min = my place (Lit: place of me)

=== Pronouns in various Kurdish languages and other languages for comparison ===
		Central Kurdish	Southern Kurdish	Modern Persian	Kurmanji	Gorani	Zazaki	Talysh	Avestan	Parthian	Middle Persian
			no distinction of nominative and oblique		nominative						
1st person	singular	min	min	man	ez	min	ez	az	azəm	az	an
1st person	plural	ême	îme	mā	em	ême	ma	əmə	ahma- (accusative)	amāh	amāh
2nd person	singular	to	ti	to	tu, ti	to	ti	tı	tvəm	tu	to
2nd person	plural	êwe	îwe	şomā	hûn	şime	şima	şımə	yūšma- (accusative)	aşmāh	aşmāh
3rd person	singular	ew	ew	ū, ān	ew	ad (masculine) ade (feminine)	o (masculine) a (feminine)	əv	hva- (masculine) hā (feminine)	ho	oy
3rd person	plural	ewane	ewane	işān, inhā	ew / ewana	adê	ê	əvon	?	hawin	oy

Oblique
Kurmanji	Zazaki	Parthian	Middle Persian	Talysh
Oblique				accusative
min	mi(n)	man	man	mıni
te	to	to	to	tıni
wî	ey	ho	oy	əvi
wê	ay	ho	–	-
me	ma	amāh	amāh	əməni
we	şıma	aşmāh	aşmāh	şıməni
wan	inan	hawin	awêşān	əvoni

== Adjectives ==
In most Kurdish varieties, adjectives follow the head noun and may be joined by 'Ezafe (ئەزافە)' or an open compound structure.

For example, the Sorani phrase 'پیاوی چاک (piyawî çak)' means 'a good man' but would literally translate to 'man of good'. In this phrase, the word 'of' is being represented by the Ezafe construction 'ی/î' attached to the noun 'پیاو/piyaw'.

== Demonstrative ==
Demonstrative pronouns when followed by postpositions (attached to the nouns) become demonstrative adjectives.

	nominative		oblique		
	singular	plural	singular		plural
	singular	plural	masc	fem	plural
near	ev ... han	ev ... ana	vî ... î	vê ... ê	van ... an
far	ew ... han	ew ... ana	wî ... î	wê ... ê	wan ... an

As demonstrative adjectives, Sorani Kurdish does not use OBL forms (though for demonstrative pronouns it does use OBL. plural forms); neither Kurmanji uses nominative plural forms.

== Verbs ==
Because the stress is distinctive in Kurdish, the acute diacritics (á) are used to denote the stressed syllables (normally not used in Kurdish) (Thackston 2006a).

=== General description ===
Kurdish verbs agree with their subjects in person and number. They have the following major characteristics:

- Verbs have two stems: present and past.
- Present stems can be simple or secondary.
- Simple tenses are formed by the addition of personal endings to the two stems.
- Secondary stems consist of a root + suffixes that indicate transitivity, intransitivity, and causativity.
- There are 3 tenses: present, past, and future.
- There are 2 voices: active and passive.
- There are 2 aspects: imperfective and perfective. Aspect is as important as tense.
- There are 4 moods: indicative, conditional, imperative, and potential.
- Past tense transitive sentences are formed as ergative constructions, i.e., transitive verbs in the past tense agree with the object rather than the subject of the sentence.

=== Non-finite endings ===
Infinitive	Ends in -ín (consonant stems), -î́n (î-stems), -án (a-stems), or -û́n (û-stems).
Past participle	Ends in -î when the stem ends in consonants or -î (hatin → hatî "come").; Ends in -yî when the stem ends in -a or -û (mán → máyî "remained").

=== Present and future ===
Present endings
	Consonantic		Vocalic	
	Singular	Plural	Singular	Plural
1st	-im	-in	-m	-n
2nd	-î	-in	-yî	-n
3rd	-i	-in	-∅	-n

- In the indicative present, augments dí- and ná- are used to make positive and negative forms, respectively (zanî́n → dízanim "I know", názanim "I don't know").
  - However, when the stem begins with a- or ê-, dí- drops its last vowel and becomes d- instead (axaftín → dáxavim "I speak"), but such forms also coexist with the non-dropping variant dí- (díaxavim).
- In the subjunctive present, augments bí- and né- is used to make positive and negative forms, respectively (zanî́n → bízanim "should I know"), but unlike the dí augment, this augment does not lost its last vowel except in some dialects.
  - The augment bí- is optional for compound verbs. The negative augment né- is also exceptional because it attaches to the verbal parts of the compound (hildán → hilnédim "should I not lift", not *néhildim).
- The present stem (placed to both indicative and subjunctive presents) are usually regular and it takes from the verb's stem, except for some common verbs where it completely irregular and it must learned as a principal part of a verb (xwestín : present xwézim "to want", dîtin : bînim "to see").
  - The present stem of verbs with infinitive in -andin, however, end in -în.
- The future tense are formed periphrastically by adding dê or -ê after the nouns or personal pronouns and before the verb. The ending -ê may cause contraction to the pronouns (tu + -ê → tê, tû ê, tiwê; ew + -ê → ewê, wê).

Present tenses for the verb zanîn ("to know"):

	Positive		Negative	
Person	Singular	Plural	Singular	Plural
Indicative present
1st	dízanim	dizanin	názanim	nazanin
2nd	dizanî	dizanin	nazanî	nazanin
3rd	dizane	dizanin	nazane	nazanin
Subjunctive present
1st	bízanim	bizanin	nézanim	nezanin
2nd	bizanî	bizanin	nezanî	nezanin
3rd	bizane	bizanin	nezane	nezanin

=== Past ===
==== Intransitive verbs ====
Past	Personal endings are similar to the present ones, except it always employs infinitive stems (hatin → hátim "I came") and do not use any augments as it does in present tenses.; Negatives are formed by ne- (hatin → nehatim "I didn't come").
Past habitual	Positive forms are formed by adding augment di- to the past, and it is almost similar to that of present tense (hatin → dihatim "I was coming").; Negative forms are formed by adding augment ne- directly to its positive counterparts instead of the stem (hatin → nédihatim "I was not coming", not *néhatim).

Past tenses for intransitive verb of hatin (to come).

Person	1st	2nd	3rd	Plural
	Intransitive past			
Simple past	hatim	hatî	hat	hatin
Imperfective preterite	dihatim	dihatî	dihat	dihatin
Perfect	hatime	hatiyî	hatiye	hatine
Pluperfect	hatibûm	hatibûy(î)	hatibû	hatibûn
Subjunctive preterite	hatibim	hatibî	hatibe	hatibin
Past Conditional	hatibama	hatibay(î)	hatiba	hatibana

If a past transitive verb accepts a nominative personal suffix, it agrees with the object of the sentence. Transitive past verbs in Sorani have OBL connected/dependent(not independent) personal pronouns on the object, if object is not mentioned they are on prefix or first part of the verb if the verb was compound, if there were not any prefix so they will be on the same place as th NOM ones. OBL connected pronouns: -m, -t, -y, -man, -tan, -yan.

== Word order ==
The normal word order in Kurdish is Subject-Verb-Object (S-V-O). Modifiers follow the nouns they modify.

== See also ==
- Elî Teremaxî
- Kurdish alphabets
- Sorani grammar
