= Central Kurdish =

Variety of Kurdish spoken in Iran and Iraq

- Kurdîy Nawendî; Soranî
- کوردیی ناوەندی; سۆرانی
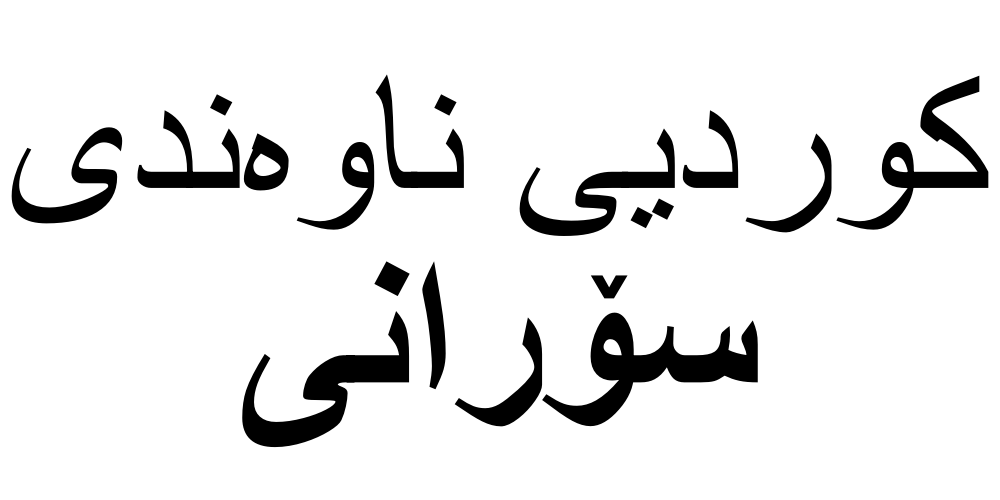
- Central Kurdish and Sorani written in the Sorani alphabet
- Native to: Iran, Iraq
- Region: Kurdistan
- Ethnicity: Kurds
- Native speakers: 6.1 million (2023–2024)
- Language family: Indo-European: Indo-Iranian; Iranian; Western; Northwestern; Kurdish; Central Kurdish
- Dialects: Babanî (Silêmanî); Mukriyanî; Erdelanî; Germiyanî (Cafî); Hewlêrî; Xoşnaw; Kerkukî
- Writing system: Arabic (Kurdo-Arabic alphabet); Latin (Hawar alphabet) (occasionally)

Official status
- Official language in: Iraq; Kurdistan Region

Language codes
- ISO 639-3: ckb
- Glottolog: cent1972
- Linguasphere: 58-AAA-cae
Geographic distribution of Kurdish and other Iranian languages spoken by Kurds
Kurmanji (Northern Kurdish)
Sorani (Central Kurdish)
Zaza language
Southern Kurdish (Gorani is included)
mixed dialect areas

A Sorani Kurdish speaker, recorded in Norway.

Central Kurdish, (Note: Kurdish: کوردیی ناوەندی, romanized: Kurdîy Nawendî, also کوردیی سۆرانی, Kurdîy Soranî, or کرمانجیی خواروو, Kurmancîy Xwarû, 'Southern Kurmanji') also known as Sorani Kurdish, is a Kurdish language variety (Note: Kurdish's status is disputed regarding its status as a single language or a group of languages.) spoken in Iraq, mainly in Iraqi Kurdistan, as well as the Iranian provinces of Kurdistan, Kermanshah, and West Azerbaijan. Central Kurdish is one of the two official languages of Iraq, along with Arabic, and is in administrative documents simply referred to as "Kurdish".

The term Sorani, named after the Soran Emirate, refers to a variety of Central Kurdish based on the dialect spoken in Slemani. Central Kurdish is written in the Kurdo-Arabic alphabet, an adaptation of the Arabic script developed in the 1920s by Sa'ed Sidqi Kaban and Taufiq Wahby.

== History ==
Tracing back the historical changes of Central Kurdish is difficult. No predecessors of Kurdish are yet known from Old and Middle Iranian times. The extant Kurdish texts may be traced back to no earlier than the 16th century CE. Central Kurdish originates from the Silêmanî region.

=== 1700s–1918 ===
The oldest written literature in Central Kurdish is reported to have been Mehdîname ("The book of Mahdi") from 1762 by Mulla Muhammed ibn ul Haj. Central Kurdish thus only emerged as a written language after the decline of the Gorani vernacular, the Ardalan state and the rise of Baban around Silêmanî. During the Baban era, Sorani emerged as an important literary vernacular and many poets such as Nalî wrote in Sorani despite being proficient in Arabic and Persian. Nalî mentioned that he wrote in Kurdish knowing his poetry might not receive the same dissemination as it might have done in the more prestigious Arabic or Persian. Contemporaries of Nalî like Salim and Mustefa Bêgî Kurdî also wrote in Sorani and their writings would become the foundation for the standard variety of Central Kurdish. When the Baban dynasty was overthrown in 1850, the golden era of Sorani ended and poets including Nalî left the Silêmanî region. Hacî Qadirî Koyî continued the tradition of writing in Sorani and lamented the lack of promotion of Sorani among the Kurdish clergy and called those who did not do so 'bastards'. Beside Koyi, Riza Talebanî also promoted Sorani as a literary language.

Prior to the 20th century, only three non-poetic Central Kurdish works are known to exist being Mewlûdname by Şêx Husên Qazî (1793–1871), a glossary of Arabic-Kurdish by Ehmedî from 1795 and a translation of the introduction to Gulistan by Saadi Shirazi.

The language of these works heavily relied on Arabic and Persian, which prevented Central Kurdish from enjoying further progress besides being a literary language. Only after World War I did this change.

Besides poetry and the few other texts mentioned above, linguistic works on Central Kurdish also existed. Leonard Chodźko wrote a sketch of the Silêmanî variety of Sorani in 1857; de Morgan wrote his "Etudea linguistiques: Dialectee Kurdea" in 1904, in which he compared eleven varieties of Kurdish to each other and with Persian and Sanskrit. Later, in 1903, Ely Bannister Soane published a learner textbook and vocabulary list on Sorani for British personnel in Kurdistan, while Oskar Mann wrote Die Mundart der Mukri Kurden containing a grammar sketch of the Central Kurdish variety of Mukriyan in 1906. Lastly, Ludvig Olsen Fossum published a grammar book in 1919 based on the Central Kurdish variety spoken around Mahabad.

=== 1918–1930s ===
After the dissolution of the Ottoman Empire, much of the Central Kurdish-speaking region came under British rule in present-day Iraq. Central Kurdish subsequently became the language for prose, media, and journalism, and a distinct alphabet was created for the vernacular. Sorani also gained a kurdified vocabulary by the 1950s. The British began publishing periodicals in the language to mobilize Kurds, since the Central Kurdish-speaking contingent of Iraq was more urbanized, better educated, and more inclined towards Kurdish nationalism than the Kurmanji-speaking population around Duhok. Such nationalism was promoted to prevent any Turkish takeover of Kirkuk and Mosul. To this end, the first government press in Sorani was established in Sulaymaniyah in 1920, which propelled Central Kurdish into becoming a language of media, education, and administration. The government press had by 1923 published six books, 118 issues of the weekly publication Pêşkewtin (Progress), fourteen issues of Bangî Kurdistan (The Call of Kurdistan), and sixteen issues of Rojî Kurdistan (The Day of Kurdistan). The period also saw the publication of Central Kurdish works for schools, and courts began using the language as well. In 1923, Taufiq Wahby was instructed to produce school books in Central Kurdish by the Iraqi government, and his modified orthography for the language would be implemented as the official Central Kurdish script in school textbooks two decades later. His orthography included purging the Arabic letters (ث/ذ/ص/ض/ط/ظ) and creating the new letters (پ/ژ/چ/گ/ڤ/ڕ/ڵ/وو/ێ). Wahby also supported switching to the Latin alphabet, but this idea was not accepted by the literary society or the state.

In the 1930s, the League of Nations urged Iraq to draft a law guaranteeing the use of the Kurdish language. The authorities reluctantly agreed, but the British knew the law would not be implemented once they left Iraq. This pushed the British to implement the law themselves in May 1931, which made Kurdish an official language in the governorates of Sulaymaniyah, Kirkuk, and Erbil. Kurds were, however, dissatisfied, since Kurdish was only allowed to be used in elementary schools and Iraq had fully arabized the education and administration systems in Kirkuk and Mosul. In subsequent years, linguistic rights for Kurds were either ignored or reluctantly implemented.

The development of Central Kurdish was slow in Iran and faced many challenges. The earliest use of the language was during the Simko Shikak revolt of 1918 to 1922, which saw the use of Central Kurdish side by side with Kurmanji as official languages in the area controlled by the rebels. After the defeat of the revolt, formal use of Central Kurdish ceased until 1946. During the rule of Reza Shah from 1925 to 1941, Iran was extremely centralist and Persian was dominant to the detriment of other languages. A decree issued by the government in 1935 suppressed Kurdish and marked its end as a written language. Only a dozen handwritten poetic manuscripts in Central Kurdish exist from this period, including works by Hassan Saifulquzzat, Said Kamil Imani, and Khalamin Barzanji.

=== 1940s–1950s ===
By the 1940s, the Silêmanî variant of the dialect had become the standard variant of Central Kurdish and even Kurds in Iran accepted this. The 1940s also saw the use of Sorani in radio broadcasting which elevated its prestige but also the urgency in proficiency since it was linked to current events.

Iraq

The 1940s experienced an intermittent suppression of Kurdish but Central Kurdish still succeeded in becoming considerably standardized by the end of the period. By the time the 14 July Revolution took place in 1958, Central Kurdish had incorporated the norms of a standard language which had given it legitimacy. During the new Iraqi Republic from 1958 to 1968, the number of journals in Central Kurdish increased fast and a Kurdish department was established at the University of Baghdad and moreover a Directorate General of Kurdish Studies was established to answer the growing Kurdish demands for mother tongue education.

In 1960, the first Central Kurdish-Arabic dictionary was published.

Iran

After the ousting of Reza Shah in 1941 and the Anglo-Soviet occupation of Iran, nationalist movements among Kurds gained strength and Central Kurdish became the formal language again, especially in Mukriyan where the Komeley Jiyanewey Kurd (KJK) used it as their official language. Central Kurdish was also introduced in schools, administration and in mosques. Kurds in Iraq aided with this, for example by exporting school books to Iran. Language planning was also in the works but rudimentary. When the Republic of Mahabad fell, formal use of Central Kurdish also ceased in Iran, however the new Pahlavi state under Mohammad Reza Pahlavi would become more tolerant than that of Reza Shah. Researcher Hassanpour argues that the reason for this was the vulnerability of the new central government which had to approach the Kurds more relaxed. For this, some developments did take place including the publication of periodicals in Central Kurdish but also state-sponsored radio broadcasting and teaching Kurdish at the University of Tehran.

In the 1950s, the Iranian authorities began restricting and controlling the tolerance towards Kurdish which continued towards the Iranian Revolution in 1979. No positive rights were given and any written use was controlled. However, the restrictions had to be loosen since Kurds in Iran were receiving radio broadcasting from Iraq and Soviet Armenia. Iran thus allowed for limited radio broadcasting in Mahabad, Sanandaj and Kermanshah which legitimized and popularized Central Kurdish further.

=== 1960s–1980s ===
Iraq

The Kurdish Scientific Academy was established in Baghdad in 1968 which devoted a significant part of their job to develop neologisms, grammar books, writing style guide-lines, a modified orthography and research in linguistics subjects. The Kurdistan Democratic Party and its media also used Central Kurdish as their official language despite its leader Mustefa Barzanî being a Kurmanji-speaker. Despite the deterioration of relations between the Kurds and Iraq in the 1970s, the state still sponsored the implementation of Central Kurdish as language in secondary schools. However, this ended by 1978 when the Iraqi authorities embarked on an Arabization to quell Kurdish nationalism. On this, Hassanpour wrote in 1992 that:

Language-related aspects of Arabization include, among other things, the Arabization of Kurdish schools in the Autonomous region; the dissolution of the Kurdish Academy in 1978 and the formation of a 'Kurdish corporation' within the Iraqi Scientific Academy (the policy was to replace 'Kurdish' by 'Iraqi' in the name of organizations, institutions and unions); the removal of Sulaymanya University from Sulaymaniya, main center of Kurdish nationalism, to Arbil and partial Arabization of its faculty and curriculum; and the Arabization of Kurdish geographical names.

Central Kurdish continued as the main language in elementary and secondary schools in Iraqi Kurdistan. In the 1980s, the state sponsored publications in Central Kurdish despite warring with the Kurds.

Iran

In the 1960s, schooling in Kurdish or teaching Kurdish was unthinkable, even in private. However, the University of Tehran began offering two courses in Kurdish even though one had to refrain from discussing Kurdish and had to call it a 'dialect'. The policy of the Pahlavi state in regard to Kurdish was like that of safety valve where rights were restricted when the state felt threatened. After the Iranian Revolution in 1979, the new Iranian constitution was ambiguous towards Kurdish but the new regime discouraged the use of Central Kurdish both in private and in public. Limited media in Central Kurdish was allowed in the subsequent years. The policy of safety valve continued throughout the 1980s.

=== 1990s ===
Iraq

Kurdistan Region Parliament passed a provisional constitution in 1992 making Kurdish the official language of Kurdistan Region. 'Kurdish' would refer to Central Kurdish which also became the language of instruction in Kurmanji– and Gorani–speaking areas until these linguistic communities demanded education in Kurmanji and Gorani, respectively. Central Kurdish ceased as language of instruction in these areas in the mid-2000s. In 1997, the Kurdistan Sciency Academy was established in Erbil with the goal of creating a unitary language in the autonomous region.

Iran

More leniency was given towards Kurdish, especially Central Kurdish in the 1990s, but use of Central Kurdish in administration and education was still not allowed. The debate on mother tongue education entered the public sphere in the 2000s.

=== 2000s–Present ===
Orthography remains a challenge for Central Kurdish. In Iraq, Central Kurdish orthography is moving towards being based on a single morpheme while Sorani-speakers in Iran make longer words. An example is the word to review which can be spelled both pêdaçûnewe and pê da çûnewe.

World Wide Web has had a significant impact on Central Kurdish as thousands of Central Kurdish-speakers have gotten free access to literature. It also became easier to listen to radio and watch television. The Internet moreover fostered the use of Central Kurdish in Iran and the diaspora, where the language had no official status, although prevalence of the language in digital spaces is still scarce overall. A language learning app for Sorani has aimed to improve the online accessibility of the language.

Arabic and Persian words continue to be purged from written Central Kurdish and are getting replaced by neologisms. Conversely, Central Kurdish is borrowing words from the English language.

Iraq

After the fall of Saddam Hussein in 2003, Iraq declared Kurdish as the official language of the country beside Arabic. The first section of Article 4 secures this. In 2006, Duhok began using Kurmanji as their official language as a way of resisting Central Kurdish. Fearing the loss of hegemony, 53 academics, writers and poets pushed the Kurdish Parliament to declare Central Kurdish as the official language of the autonomous region. This attempt failed multiple times and Kurmanji remains the official Kurdish language in Duhok. In the 2010s, criticism arose due to the quality of the Sorani school textbooks, media texts and signage. In 2011, two journalism professors from Salahaddin University criticized the state of Central Kurdish in Kurdistan Region which could affect its use among the people. They also expressed dismay over the method of the Kurdistan Region Parliament in using the language, since the institution wrote their bills and laws in Arabic and then translated to Central Kurdish.

Iran

More flexibility was shown to Kurdish in the mid-2000s by the reformists, likely to win the Kurdish vote. Kurds used the opportunity and began publishing more in Central Kurdish, set up private language learning courses and also advocated for the implementation of Article 15 of the Constitution which would allow the use of regional languages. The use of Central Kurdish in Iran has since then been revitalized by Kurdish book publishers like Mang. Nonetheless, the use of Central Kurdish in the public school system is not supported by Iranian nationalists and conservatives who believe it could damage the unity of the nation-state.

== Writing system ==
Central Kurdish is mostly written with a modified version of the Arabic alphabet. The Latin-based Hawar Alphabet is also used increasingly, and there have been discussions about its adoption.

In the Central Kurdish writing system almost all vowels are always written as separate letters. This is in contrast to the original Arabic writing system and most other writing systems developed from it, in which certain vowels (usually "short" vowels) are shown by diacritics above and under the letters, and usually omitted.

The other major point of departure of the Central Kurdish writing system from other Arabic-based systems is that the Arabic letters that represent sounds that are non-existent in Kurdish are usually (but not always) replaced by letters that better represent their Kurdish pronunciation.

== Media and education ==
Iraq is the only country in which a Kurdish language has enjoyed official or semi-official rights during the last few decades. Kurdish media outlets in Iraq mushroomed during the 1990s, spurred by the semi-autonomous status the region has enjoyed since the uprising against the Saddam regime in 1991. The use of Kurdish in media and education is prevalent in Iraqi Kurdistan. Seven of the top 10 TV stations viewed by Iraqi Kurds are Kurdish-language stations, and the use of Arabic in Kurdistan schools has decreased to the extent that the number of Iraqi Kurds who speak Arabic fluently has dropped significantly over the past decades.

Some Kurdish media in Iraq seem to be aiming for constructing a cross-border Kurdish identity. The Kurdish-language satellite channel Kurdistan TV (KTV), owned by the Kurdistan Democratic Party (KDP), for example, employs techniques that expose audiences to more than one Kurdish variety in the same show or program. It has been suggested that continuous exposure to different Kurdish varieties on KTV and other satellite television stations might make Kurdish varieties increasingly mutually intelligible.

In Iran, state-sponsored regional TV stations air programs in both Kurdish and Persian. Kurdish press are legally allowed in Iran, but there have been many reports of a policy of banning Kurdish newspapers and arresting Kurdish activists.

== Phonology ==
Central Kurdish has 9 phonemic vowels and 26 to 28 phonemic consonants (depending on whether the pharyngeal sounds /ħ/ and /ʕ/ are counted or not).

Central Kurdish Consonants
		Labial	Dental/ Alveolar		Palatal	Velar		Uvular		Pharyngeal	Glottal
		Labial	plain	velar.	plain	plain	labial.	plain	labial.	Pharyngeal	Glottal
Nasal		m	n			ŋ					
Plosive	voiceless asp.	pʰ	tʰ		t͡ʃʰ	kʰ					
Plosive	vcls. unasp.	p	t		t͡ʃ	k	kʷ	q	qʷ		ʔ
Plosive	voiced	b	d		d͡ʒ	ɡ	ɡʷ				
Fricative	voiceless	f	s	sˠ	ʃ	x	xʷ			ħ	h
Fricative	voiced	v	z	zˠ	ʒ	ɣ	ɣʷ			ʕ	
Approximant			l	ɫ	j		w				
Tap/flap			ɾ								
Trill			r								

=== Vowels ===
	Front		Back	
	unrounded	rounded	unrounded	rounded
Close	ɪ iː			ʊ uː
Close-mid	eː	øː		oː
Open-mid	ɛ			
Open	a		ɑː	

Vowels in parentheses are not phonemic, but have been included in the table below because of their ubiquity in the language. Letters in the Central Kurdish alphabet take various forms depending on where they occur in the word. Forms given below are letters in isolation.

IPA	Kurdo-Arabic Alphabet	Romanization	Example Word (Central Kurdish)	Example Word (English)
i	ى	î	hiʧ = "nothing"	"beet"
ɪ	-	i	gɪr'tɪn = "to take, to hold"	"bit"
e	ێ	ê	hez = "power"	"bait"
ɛ	ه	e	bɛjɑni = "morning"	"bet"
ə	ە	e	ʃəw = night	"but"
æ	ه	e	tænæ'kæ = "tin can"	"bat"
u	وو	û	gur = "calf"	"boot"
ʊ	و	u	gʊɾg = "wolf"	"book"
o	ۆ	o	gor = "level"	"boat"
ɑ	ا	a	mangɑ = "cow"	"balm" ("father")

==== Some vowel alternations and notes ====
The vowel [æ] is sometimes pronounced as [ə] (the sound found in the first syllable of the English word "above"). This sound change takes place when [æ] directly precedes [w] or when it is followed by the sound [j] (like English "y") in the same syllable. If it, instead, precedes [j] in a context where [j] is a part of another syllable it is pronounced [ɛ] (as in English "bet").

The vowels [o] and [e], both of which have slight off-glides in English, do not possess these off-glides in Sorani.

=== Consonants ===
Letters in the Central Kurdish alphabet take various forms depending on where they occur in the word.

An important allophonic variation concerns the two velar sounds /k/ and /g/. Similar to certain other languages of the region (e.g. Turkish and Persian), these consonants are strongly palatalized before the close and mid front vowels (/i/ and /e/) in Central Kurdish.

=== Syllable ===
Central Kurdish allows both complex onsets (e.g. spî: "white", kwêr: "blind") and complex codas (e.g. ferş: "carpet"). However, the two members of the clusters are arranged in such a way that, in all cases, the Sonority Sequencing Principle (SSP) is preserved. In many loanwords, an epenthetic vowel is inserted to resyllabify the word, omitting syllables that have codas that violate SSP. Originally mono-syllabic words such as /hazm/ ("digestion") and /zabt/ ("record") therefore become /hɛ.zɪm/ and /zɛ.bɪt/ respectively.

Primary stress always falls on the last syllable in nouns, but in verbs its position differs depending on tense and aspect. Some have suggested the existence of an alternating pattern of secondary stress in syllables in Central Kurdish words.

== Grammar ==
=== Absolute state ===
A noun in the absolute state occurs without any suffix, as it would occur in a vocabulary list or dictionary entry. Absolute state nouns receive a generic interpretation, as in "qawe reş e." ("Coffee is black.") and "befr spî ye." ("Snow is white").

=== Indefinite state ===
Indefinite nouns receive an interpretation like English nouns preceded by a, an, some, or any.

Several modifiers may only modify nouns in the indefinite state. This list of modifiers includes:

- çend [ʧɛnd] "a few"
- hemû [hɛmu] "every"
- çî [ʧi] "what"
- her [hɛɾ] "each"
- ... i zor [ɪ zoɾ] "many"

Nouns in the indefinite state take the following endings:

	Singular	Plural
Noun Ending with a Vowel	-yek	-yan
Noun Ending with a Consonant	-êk	-an

A few examples are given below showing how nouns are made indefinite:

- پیاو piyaw 'man' > پیاوێک piyawêk 'a man'
- نامه name 'letter' > نامه‌یه‌ک nameyek 'a letter'
- پیاو piyaw 'man' > پیاوان piyawan '(some) men'
- ده‌رگا derga 'door' > ده‌رگایان dergayan '(some) doors'

==== Definite state ====
Definite nouns receive an interpretation like English nouns preceded by the.

Nouns in the definite state take the following endings:

	Singular	Plural
Noun Ending with a Vowel	-ke	-kan
Noun Ending with a Consonant	-eke	-ekan

When a noun stem ending with [i] is combined with the definite state suffix the result is pronounced [ekɛ] ( i + eke → ekɛ)

=== Verbs ===
Like many other Iranian languages, verbs have a present stem and a past stem in Sorani. The present simple tense, for example, is composed of the aspect marker "de" ("e" in Sulaymaniyah dialect) followed by the present stem followed by a suffixed personal ending. This is shown in the example below with the verb نووسین / nûsîn ("to write"), the present stem of which is نووس / nûs.

Verb	Meaning
ده‌نووسم denûsim	I write
ده‌نووسی denûsî	You (sg.) write
ده‌نووسێ denûsê	She/He/It writes
ده‌نووسین denûsîn	We write
ده‌نووسن denûsin	You (pl.) write
ده‌نووسن denûsin	They write

Note that the personal endings are identical for the second person plural (Plural "you") and third person plural ("they").

Similarly, the simple past verb is created using the past stem of the verb. The following example shows the conjugation of the intransitive verb هاتن hatin ("to come") in the simple past tense. The past stem of "hatin" is "hat".

Verb	Meaning
هاتم hatim	I came
هاتی hatî	You (sg.) came
هات hat	She/He/It came
هاتین hatîn	We came
هاتن hatin	You (pl.) came
هاتن hatin	They came

Central Kurdish is claimed by some to have split ergativity, with an ergative-absolutive arrangement in the past tense for transitive verbs. Others, however, have cast doubt on this claim, noting that the Central Kurdish past may be different in important ways from a typical ergative-absolutive arrangement. In any case, the transitive past tense in Central Kurdish is special in that the agent affix looks like the possessive pronouns and usually precedes the verb stem (similar to how accusative pronouns in other tenses). In the following example, the transitive verb نووسین / nûsîn ("to write") is conjugated in the past tense, with the object "name" ("letter"). The past stem of the verb is "nûsî".

Verb	Meaning
نامه‌م نووسی namem nûsî	I wrote a letter.
نامه‌ت نووسی namet nûsî	You (sg.) wrote a letter.
نامه‌ی نووسی namey nûsî	She/He/It wrote a letter.
نامه‌مان نووسی nameman nûsî	We wrote a letter.
نامه‌تان نووسی nametan nûsî	You (pl.) wrote a letter.
نامه‌یان نووسی nameyan nûsî	They wrote a letter.

Note in the example above that the clitics attaching to the objects are otherwise interpreted as possessive pronouns. The combination "name-m" therefore is translated as "my letter" in isolation, "name-t" as "your letter", and so on.

The agent affix is a clitic that must attach to a preceding word/morpheme. If the verb phrase has words other than the verb itself (as in the above example), it attaches to first word in the verb phrase. If no such pre-verbal matter exists, it attaches to the first morpheme of the verb. In the progressive past, for example, where the aspect marker "de" precedes the verb stem, the clitic attaches to "de".

== See also ==
- Kurdish alphabets
- Sorani grammar

== Other sources ==
- Hassanpour, A. (1992). Nationalism and Language in Kurdistan 1918–1985. USA: Mellen Research University Press.
- Nebez, Jemal (1976). Toward a Unified Kurdish Language. NUKSE.
- Baran, Murat (2021). Kurdish Grammar: SORANI Reference Book. Silêmanî: Amazon publishing. ISBN 979-8-5606-4352-2.
- Sheyholislami, Jaffer (2021), "The History and Development of Literary Central Kurdish", in Bozarslan, Hamit (ed.), The Cambridge History of the Kurds, Cambridge University Press, pp. 633–662, doi:10.1017/9781108623711.026, ISBN 978-1-108-62371-1, S2CID 235541104
- Thackston, W.M. (2006), "—Sorani Kurdish— A Reference Grammar with Selected Readings" (PDF), Harvard Faculty of Arts & Sciences, Harvard University, archived from the original (PDF) on 27 February 2021
