= Asia Tawfiq Wahbi =

Iraqi writer and social reformer (1901-1980)

- آسيا توفيق وهبي
- Born: 1901; Baghdad, Ottoman Empire
- Died: 1980 (aged 78–79); Baghdad, Iraq
- Occupations: writer, social reformer and leader of the women's movement in Iraq
- Organization(s): Society for Combating Social Illness, Iraqi Women's Union
- Spouse: Tawfiq Wahbi

Asia Tawfiq Wahbi (Arabic: آسيا توفيق وهبي) (1980–1901) was an Iraqi writer, social reformer and leader of the women's movement in Iraq. She inaugurated the first feminist union in Iraq, the al-Ittihad al-Nisai (Iraqi Women's Union), and was one of the founders of the Society for Combating Social Illness.

== Biography ==
Wahbi was born in Baghdad, Iraq, in 1901, where her father was a merchant. She was married to the Kurdish linguist and politician Colonel Tawfiq Wahbi.

In 1937, Wahbi was one of the founders of the Society for Combating Social Illness. In the 1940s, she served as president of women's branch of the Child Protection (or Welfare) Society. In 1945, she inaugurated the first feminist union in Iraq, the al-Ittihad al-Nisai (Iraqi Women's Union), as a licensed body. She campaigned against women being trapped in unwanted polygamous marriages.

Wahbi was editor in chief of the Iraqi Women's Union magazine. She also wrote for the monthly publication Nisa i al-İraqi.

Wahbi died in Baghdad in 1980.
