= Kurmanji =

Northern Kurdish language

- Northern Kurdish
- کورمانجی, kurmancî
- Kurmanji Kurdish written in both scripts
- Native to: Armenia, Azerbaijan, Iraq, Iran, Syria, Turkey
- Region: Autochthonous to Kurdistan, Kurdish diaspora
- Ethnicity: Kurds
- Native speakers: 17 million (2017–2024)
- Language family: Indo-European: Indo-Iranian; Iranian; Western; Northwestern; Kurdish; Kurmanji
- Writing system: Hawar alphabet (Latin script; used mostly in Turkey and Syria); Sorani alphabet (Perso-Arabic script; used mostly in Iraq and Iran); Cyrillic alphabet (former Soviet Union); Armenian alphabet (1921–29 in Soviet Armenia)

Official status
- Recognised minority language in: Armenia; Syria

Language codes
- ISO 639-1: ku
- ISO 639-3: kmr
- Glottolog: nort2641
- Linguasphere: 58-AAA-a
Geographic distribution of the Kurdish languages spoken by Kurds
Kurmanji (Northern Kurdish)
Sorani (Central Kurdish)
Zaza language
Southern Kurdish (Gorani is included)
mixed language areas

A man speaking Kurmanji.

Kurmanji (Kurdish: کورمانجی, Latin script: Kurmancî,), also termed Northern Kurdish, is the northernmost of the Kurdish languages, spoken predominantly in southeast Turkey, northwest and northeast Iran, northern Iraq, northern Syria and the Caucasus and Khorasan regions. It is the most widely spoken form of Kurdish.

Kurmanji is the main liturgical language of Yazidism. The qewls, the sacred hymns of the Yazidis and the most authoritative form of Yazidi religious literature, are composed almost entirely in Kurmanji. They are passed down chiefly by oral recitation among the Yazidi clergy, who sing them from memory at religious rites and festivals. The hymns are mostly in the dialect of the Yazidis of Sheikhan, which has lexical and grammatical features not found in other Kurmanji dialects, and elsewhere they may circulate in the local dialect. Their vocabulary contains rarely used old Kurdish words and religious terminology that may seem archaic to speakers of the modern dialect, and its grammar does not always follow the norms of the literary language.

Ethnologue reports that the use of Kurmanji is declining in Turkey even when the language is used as a language of wider communication (LWC) by immigrants to Turkey, and that the language is threatened because it is losing speakers.

== History ==
=== Pre-modern Kurmanji ===
The qewls, the sacred hymns of the Yazidis, preserved orally, are composed in Kurmanji and are traditionally placed in the time of Sheikh Adi and his disciples (12th century), most of them attributed to Şêx Fexredîn. Their composers are regarded by linguists as having been highly educated for their time, with a knowledge of philosophy, theology and linguistics, and the hymns are marked by dense metaphor and a rich vocabulary. Preserved chiefly through oral recitation by the Yazidi clergy, some qewls were also copied in Arabic script by some clergy families.

A growing interest in the use of Kurdish in literature began from the 16th century on when Kurdistan had relative political stability and economic prosperity. It was not until the 16th century, that a Kurmanji literary tradition arose. During this era, Sharafkhan Bidlisi from the Principality of Bitlis, wrote that a certain leader of the Derzin Castle wrote most of his poetry and theological commentaries in a Kurdish suggested to have been Kurmanji. Furthermore, during his trips to Kurdistan, Evliya Çelebi praised the educational institutions of the Amedi and Akre regions and quoted a poem by a local poet in his work. Prominent scholars from this period, whose works are preserved today include Melayê Cizîrî, Feqiyê Teyran, Elî Teremaxî and Ehmedê Xanî. Unlike his peers, Xanî consciously worked to codify Kurdish as a written language. Pre-modern Kurmanji began to decline in the 19th century simultaneously with decline of the Kurdish principalities.

== Phonology ==
Phonological features in Kurmanji include the distinction between aspirated and unaspirated voiceless stops and the presence of facultative phonemes. For example, Kurmanji Kurdish distinguishes between aspirated and unaspirated voiceless stops, which can be aspirated in all positions. Thus /p/ contrasts with /pʰ/, /t/ with /tʰ/, /k/ with /kʰ/, and the affricate /t͡ʃ/ with /t͡ʃʰ/.

== Dialect continuum ==
Kurmanji forms a dialect continuum of great variability. Loosely, six dialect areas can be distinguished:

- Northwestern Kurmanji, spoken in the Kahramanmaraş (in Kurmanji: Meraş), Malatya (Meletî) and Sivas (Sêwaz) provinces of the northwest of Turkish Kurdistan.
- Southwestern Kurmanji, spoken in the Adıyaman (Semsûr), Gaziantep (Dîlok) and Şanlıurfa (Riha) provinces of Turkish, and Aleppo Governorate, most notably in Afrin (Efrîn), in the west of Syrian Kurdistan.
- Northern Kurmanji or Serhed Kurdish, spoken mainly in the Ağrı (Agirî), Erzurum (Erzerom) and Muş (Mûş) provinces of the northeast of Turkish Kurdistan, as well as adjacent areas.
- Southern Kurmanji, spoken in Al-Hasakah Governorate in the east of Syrian Kurdistan, Sinjar District (Şingal) in the west of Iraqi Kurdistan, and in several adjacent parts of the south of Turkish Kurdistan, centered on the Mardin (Mêrdîn) and Batman (Êlih) provinces.
- Southeastern Kurmanji or Badînî, spoken in Hakkâri Province (Parêzgeha Colêmêrgê) in the southeast of Turkish Kurdistan, and the Dohuk Governorate (Parêzgeha Dihokê) and parts of Erbil Governorate (Parêzgeha Hewlêr) in the north of Iraqi Kurdistan.
- Anatolian Kurmanji is spoken in Central Anatolia (Anatolya Navîn), especially in Konya, Ankara, and Aksaray, by Anatolian Kurds

=== Ezdîkî and Yazidi politics ===
Among some Yazidis, the glossonym Ezdîkî is used for Kurmanji to differentiate themselves from Kurds. While Ezdîkî is no different from Kurmanji, some attempt to prove that Ezdîkî is an independent language, including claims that it is a Semitic language. This has been criticized as not being based on scientific evidence and lacking scientific consensus.

On January 25, 2002, Armenia ratified the European Charter for Regional or Minority Languages and placed Kurdish under state protection. However, because of the divided Yazidi community in Armenia and after strong criticism from parts of the community, the authorities chose to ratify the charter by mentioning both "Kurdish" and "Yezidi" as two separate languages. This resulted in the term Êzdîkî being used by some researchers when delving into the question of minority languages in Armenia, since most Kurdish-speakers in Armenia are Yazidis. As a consequence of this move, Armenian universities offer language courses in both Kurmanji and Êzdîkî as two different dialects.

== Kurmanji among other groups ==
During the end of the Ottoman era, Assyrians in Tur Abdin shifted from speaking their traditional Turoyo language to either Kurmanji or Arabic. Kurdophone Armenians also exist and there were prior to the Armenian genocide around 110 Kurmanji-speaking Armenian villages in Beşiri and Silvan.

Bulgarian, Chechen and Circassian immigrants in Turkish Kurdistan also speak Kurmanji.

== See also ==
- Kurdish alphabets
- Kurdish grammar
- Kurmancî, a Kurdish linguistic magazine
- Mela Huseynê Bateyî

== Bibliography ==
- Sheyholislami, Jaffer (2021), "The History and Development of Literary Central Kurdish", in Bozarslan, Hamit (ed.), The Cambridge History of the Kurds, Cambridge University Press, pp. 603–632, doi:10.1017/9781108623711.026, ISBN 9781108623711, S2CID 235541104
