= Elî Teremaxî =

Kurdish linguist, writer and teacher

Elî Teremaxî or Ali Taramakhi (Kurdish: عەلی تەرەماخی, romanized: Elî Teremaxî), was a Kurdish linguist, writer and teacher who lived in the late 17th century or early 18th century, credited for writing the first Kurdish grammar book in Kurdish.

== Biography ==
Little is known about his life and the most important source for him is a brief sketch by Mahmud Bayazidi from the mid-19th century. Bayazidi wrote that Teremaxî was born in the village of Teremax (Yaylakonak today) in Miks in Kurdistan. He went to study in Baghdad, Mosul, and in the Soran and Bahdinan emirates of Kurdistan. He gained fame throughout Kurdistan, but returned to Teremax where he founded a mosque and a madrasa. He later died in his village. It is not certain when Teremaxî lived, but Bayazidi stated that he lived around 1591. However, scholar Leezenberg argued that he lived around the end of the 17th century or beginning of the 18th century. It was after seeing the difficulty among his students in understanding grammar from Arabic books, that he chose to write a Kurdish book.

== Kurdish grammar book ==
In the first half of the book, Teremaxî discussed Arabic grammar and to a lesser degree Persian grammar which was intended to be an introductory text. The only reference in this section was Sa'dînî by Al-Taftazani. He concluded the introduction by emphasizing the importance of grammar, particularly Kurdish grammar. In his introduction, he further translated technical terms from Arabic to understandable Kurdish for his students. In the second part of the book, he moves on to studying Kurdish and Persian grammar and cursorily mentioned that the grammar of these two languages does not follow that of Arabic. He then introduced Kurdish and Persian next to each other and highlighted the differences between the two languages. Leezenberg argued, moreover, that by introducing Kurdish and Persian simultaneously, Teremaxî was aware of the major structural similarities between the two languages. Leezenberg also noted that Teremaxî omitted the ergative construction of Kurdish which would have made him the first to describe such.

Throughout the book, Teremaxî refrained from treating Arabic and Persian as superior languages, treating all three of them as equal.

Quote from the book:

Reader, know that it is also necessary for the Kurdish people... that they know the science of Sarf [morphology] in the Kurdish language; for the basis and foundation of all sciences is the science of Sarf... In all languages, this science exists and is practised; but what is now necessary for us is [sarf in] the Kurdish language.

The book was widely known among Kurds and used in madrasas all over Kurdistan, especially in northern Kurdistan.

== Literature ==
- "Serfa Kurmancî" / "Tesrîfa Kurdî" / "Tesrîf" [Kurdish morphology]

== See also ==
- List of Kurdish philosophers

== Bibliography ==
- Hassanpour, Amir (1992), Nationalism and Language in Kurdistan, 1918-1985, Mellen Research University Press, ISBN 9780773498167
- Leezenberg, Michiel (2014), "Elî Teremaxî and the Vernacularization of Medrese Learning in Kurdistan", Iranian Studies, 47 (5): 713–733, doi:10.1080/00210862.2014.934150, ISSN 0021-0862, S2CID 162201041
