= Kurdish alphabets =

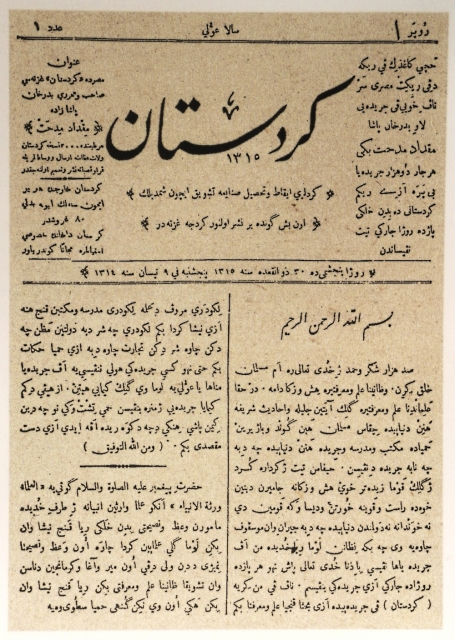
The Kurdistan newspaper established in 1898, prior to latinization, was written in the Kurmanji dialect using Arabic script.

Kurdish is most commonly written using either of two alphabets: the Latin-based Bedirxan or Hawar alphabet, introduced by Celadet Alî Bedirxan in 1932 and popularized through the Hawar magazine, and the Kurdo-Arabic alphabet. The Kurdistan Region has agreed upon a standard for Central Kurdish, implemented in Unicode for computation purposes. The Hawar alphabet is primarily used in Syria and Turkey, while the Kurdo-Arabic alphabet is commonly used in Iraq and Iran. The Hawar alphabet is also used to some extent in Iraqi Kurdistan. Two additional alphabets, based on the Armenian and Cyrillic scripts, were once used by Kurds in the Soviet Union, most notably in the Armenian Soviet Socialist Republic and Kurdistansky Uyezd. Southern Kurdish lacks a standard orthography, as of 2024.

== Hawar alphabet ==
Usually it is the northern languages spoken by Kurds, Zazaki and Kurmanji, that are written in the extended Latin alphabet consisting of the 26 letters of the ISO basic Latin Alphabet with 5 letters with diacritics, for a total of 31 letters (each having an uppercase and a lowercase form):

Hawar alphabet
1	2	3	4	5	6	7	8	9	10	11	12	13	14	15	16	17	18	19	20	21	22	23	24	25	26	27	28	29	30	31
Majuscule forms (also called uppercase or capital letters)
A	B	C	Ç	D	E	Ê	F	G	H	I	Î	J	K	L	M	N	O	P	Q	R	S	Ş	T	U	Û	V	W	X	Y	Z
Minuscule forms (also called lowercase or small letters)
a	b	c	ç	d	e	ê	f	g	h	i	î	j	k	l	m	n	o	p	q	r	s	ş	t	u	û	v	w	x	y	z
IPA Values
/aː/	/b/	/dʒ/	/tʃ/	/d/	/ɛ/	/eː/	/f/	/g/	/h/	/ɪ/	/iː/	/ʒ/	/k/	/l/	/m/	/n/	/o/	/p/	/q/	/ɾ/	/s/	/ʃ/	/t/	/ʉ/	/u/	/v/	/w/	/x/	/j/	/z/

In this alphabet the short vowels are E, I and U while the long vowels are A, Ê, Î, O and Û (see the IPA equivalents in the Help:IPA/Kurdish table).

When presenting the alphabet in his magazine Hawar, Celadet Alî Bedirxan proposed using diacritics on ⟨ḧ ẍ⟩ to distinguish the Arabic غ and ح sounds (see page 12, 13). These are not considered letters, but are used to disambiguate loanwords that would otherwise be conflated.

Turkey does not recognize this alphabet. Using the letters Q, W, and X, which did not exist in the Turkish alphabet until 2013, led to a trial in 2000 and 2003 (see , p. 8, and ). Since September 2003, many Kurds applied to the courts seeking to change their names to Kurdish ones written with these letters, but failed.

The Turkish government finally legalized the letters Q, W, and X as part of the Turkish alphabet in 2013.

=== History ===
The Kurdish Latin alphabet was elaborated mainly by Celadet Bedirxan who initially had sought the cooperation of Tewfîq Wehbî, who in 1931 lived in Iraq. But after not having received any responses by Wehbî for several months, he and his brother Kamuran Alî Bedirxan decided to launch the "Hawar" alphabet in 1932. Celadet Bedirxan aimed to create an alphabet that wrote each sound with its own letter. As the Kurds in Turkey already learned the Turkish Latin alphabet, he created an alphabet which would specifically be accessible for the Kurds in Turkey. Some scholars have suggested making minor additions to Bedirxan's alphabet to make it more user-friendly.

== Kurdo-Arabic alphabet ==
Venn diagram showing Kurdish, Persian and Arabic letters

Many Kurdish varieties, mainly Sorani, are written using a modified Perso-Arabic script with 33 letters introduced by Sa'id Kaban Sedqi. Unlike the Persian alphabet, which is an abjad, Central Kurdish is almost a true alphabet in which vowels are given the same treatment as consonants. Written Central Kurdish also relies on vowel and consonant context to differentiate between the phonemes u/w and î/y instead of using separate letters. It does show the two pharyngeal consonants, as well as a voiced velar fricative, used in Kurdish.

A new sort order for the alphabet was proposed some time ago by the Kurdish Academy as the new standard, all of which are letters accepted included in the Central Kurdish Unicode Keyboard:

ع	ش	س	ژ	ز	ڕ	ر	د	خ	ح	چ	ج	ت	پ	ب	ا	ئـ
17	16	15	14	13	12	11	10	9	8	7	6	5	4	3	2	1
[ʕ]	[ʃ]	[s]	[ʒ]	[z]	[r]	[ɾ]	[d]	[x]	[ħ]	[t͡ʃ]	[d͡ʒ]	[t]	[p]	[b]	[aː]	[ʔ]
ێ	ی	ۆ	وو	و	ە	ھ	ن	م	ڵ	ل	گ	ک	ق	ڤ	ف	غ
34	33	32	31	30	29	28	27	26	25	24	23	22	21	20	19	18
[eː]	[j], [iː]	[oː]	[uː]	[w], [ʊ]	[ɛ]	[h]	[n]	[m]	[ɫ]	[l]	[g]	[k]	[q]	[v]	[f]	[ɣ]

The alphabet is represented by 34 letters including وو which is given its own position. Kurds in Iraq and Iran use this alphabet. Although the Kurdistan Region's standardization uses ک (Unicode 06A9) instead of ك (Unicode 0643) for letter kaf (22 in above table) as listed in the Unicode table on the official home page, the latter glyph is still in use by various individuals and organizations.

=== Vowels ===
Central Kurdish has eight vowels, all of them except /ɪ/ are represented by letters:

#	Letter	IPA	Example
1	ا	aː (ɑː)	با /baː/ "wind"
2	ە	ɛ (ə, æ)	مەزن /mɛzɪn/ "great"
3	و	u, ʊ	کورد /kʊɾd/ "Kurd"
4	ۆ	oː, o	تۆ /toː/ "you"
5	وو	uː	گەردوون /gɛrduːn/ "cosmos"
6	ی	iː	شین /ʃiːn/ "blue"
7	ێ	eː	دێ /deː/ "village"

Similar to some letters in English, both و (u) and ی (î) can become consonants. In the words وان (Note: Kurdish pronunciation: [wɑːn]) (Wan) and یاری (Note: Kurdish pronunciation: [jɑɾiː]) (play), و and ی are consonants. Central Kurdish stipulates that syllables must be formed with at least one vowel, whilst a maximum of two vowels is permitted.

== Historical alphabets ==
=== Purported old Kurdish script ===
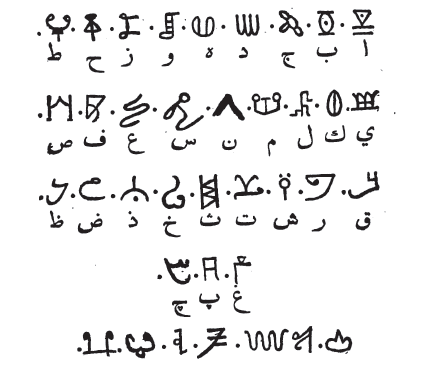
Purported Kurdish script, from the book Shawq al-Mustaham, attributed to Ibn Wahshiyya

In the Arabic book Shawq al-Mustaham, attributed to the 9th-century author Ibn Wahshiyya, the author refers to the existence of a Kurdish alphabet and to scientific and artistic works written in Kurdish. The works attributed to Ibn Wahshiyya are the subject of debate and not considered totally reliable, and this particular book is regarded as "a later pseudepigraph which used the names made famous by Ibn Wahshiyya". There is no other source that confirms this reference to written Kurdish at this early date.

=== Cyrillic alphabet ===
A third system, used for the few Kurmanji-speaking Kurds in the former Soviet Union—especially in Armenia—used a unique variant of the Cyrillic alphabet, consisting of 40 letters. It was designed in 1946 by Heciyê Cindî.

А а	Б б	В в	Г г	Гʼ гʼ	Д д	Е е	Ә ә	Әʼ әʼ	Ж ж
З з	И и	Й й	К к	Кʼ кʼ	Л л	М м	Н н	О о	Ӧ ӧ
П п	Пʼ пʼ	Р р	Рʼ рʼ	С с	Т т	Тʼ тʼ	У у	Ф ф	Х х
Һ һ	Һʼ һʼ	Ч ч	Чʼ чʼ	Ш ш	Щ щ	Ь ь	Э э	Ԛ ԛ	Ԝ ԝ

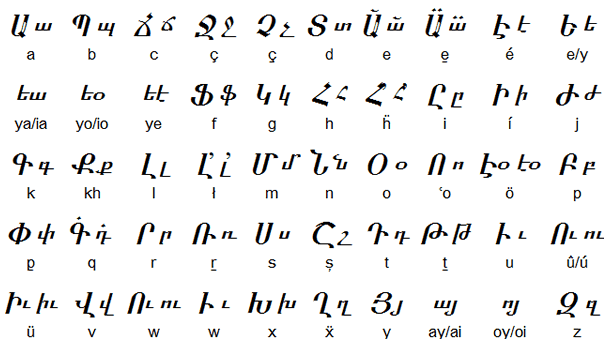
The Armenian-Kurdish Alphabet.

=== Armenian alphabet ===
From 1921 to 1929, a modified version of the west Armenian alphabet was used for Kurmanji, in the Armenian Soviet Socialist Republic.

It was then replaced with a Yañalif-like Latin alphabet during the campaigns for Latinisation in the Soviet Union.

=== Soviet Latin alphabet ===
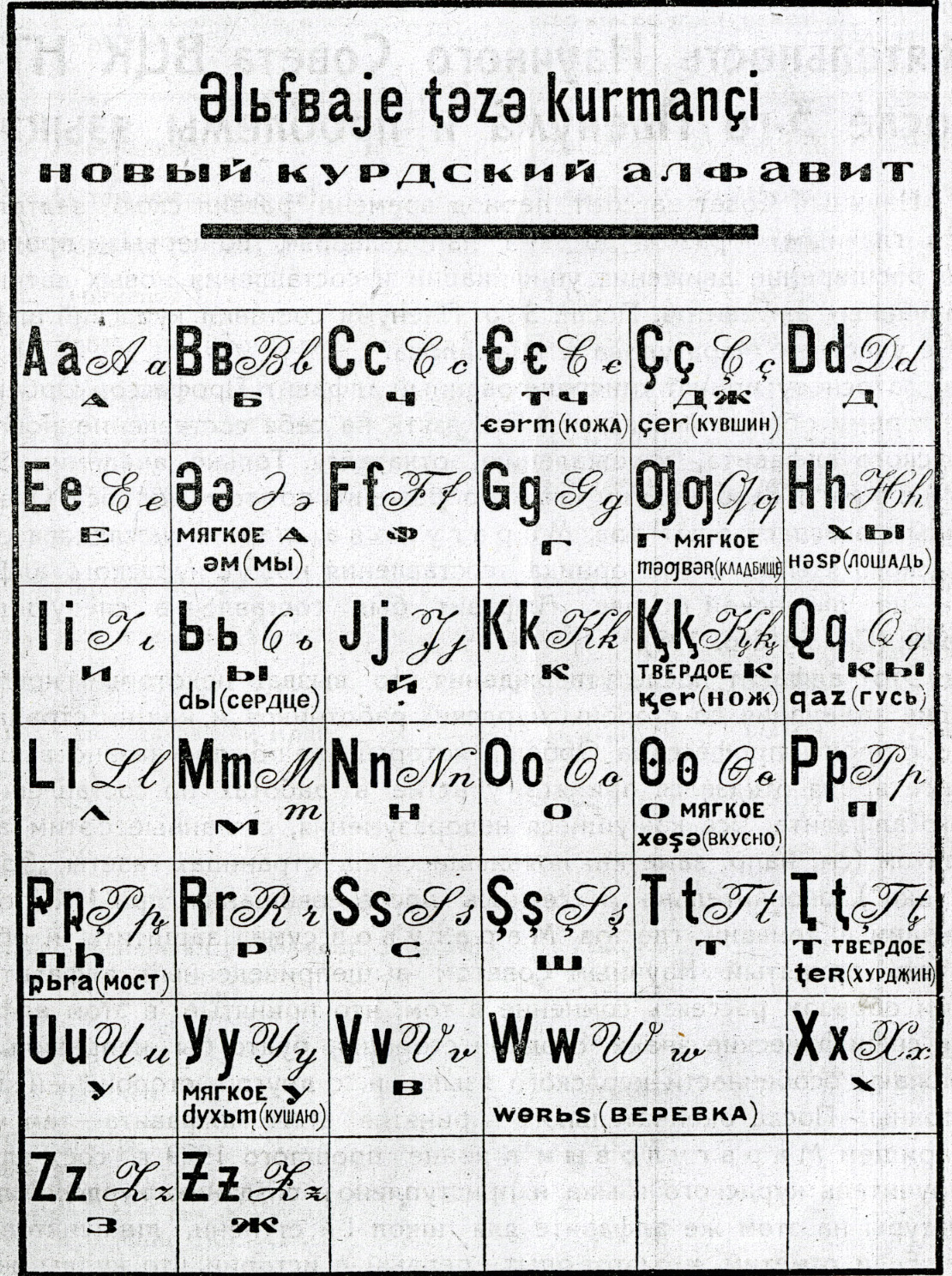
Kurdish Soviet Latin Alphabet.

In 1928, Kurdish languages in all of the Soviet Union, including the Armenian Soviet Socialist Republic, were switched to a Latin alphabet containing some Cyrillic characters.

1929 it was reformed and was replaced by the following alphabet:

A a	B ʙ	C c	Ꞓ ꞓ	Ç ç	D d	E e	Ə ə
Ə́ ə́	F f	G g	Ƣ ƣ	H h	Ħ ħ	I i	J j
K k	Ⱪ ⱪ	L l	M m	N n	O o	Ɵ ɵ	P p
Ҏ ҏ	Q q	R r	S s	Ş ş	T t	Ţ ţ	U u
V v	W w	X x	У y	Z z	Ƶ ƶ	Ь ь

The Soviet Latin alphabet is no longer used.

=== Yezidi script ===
Yezidi
- The name of 'Khatuna Fekhra', a Yazidi female saint, in Yazidi script
- Period: 13th century — present
- Direction: Right-to-left script
- Languages: Northern Kurdish

ISO 15924
- ISO 15924: Yezi (192), Yezidi

Unicode
- Unicode alias: Yezidi
- Unicode range: U+10E80..U+10EBF

The Yezidi script is written from right to left and was used to write in Kurdish, specifically in the Kurmanji dialect (also called Northern Kurdish). The script has a long history, according to some data, it can be dated back to 13th-14th centuries, however, some scholars trace the creation of this script to 17th-18th centuries. The author of the script is unknown, but it was used for two manuscripts, Meṣḥefa Reş and Kitêba Cilwe, first published by Anastase-Marie al-Karmali in 1911.

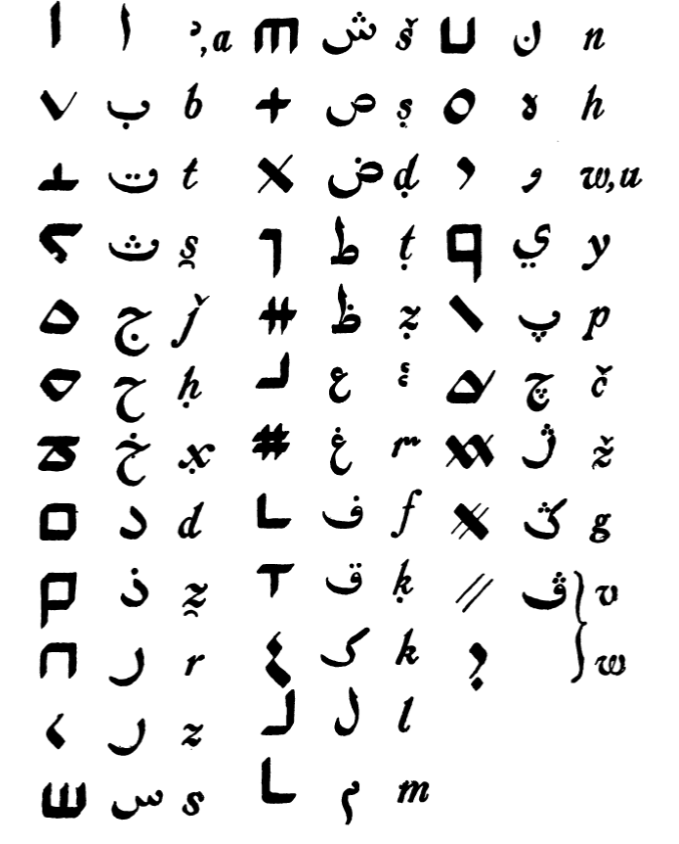
Yazidi Script by Anastase-Marie al-Karmali, 1911

It is believed that historically, there existed two sacred Yezidi manuscripts known as Meshefa Reş and Kitêba Cilwe, but the originals were lost. Later copies of these manuscripts were found, written in a special Yezidi alphabet, however, their contents were distorted. As a result, while the Yazidi clergy do recognize the Yezidi alphabet, they do not consider the content of these two manuscripts to be sources of the Yezidi religion.

In 2013, the Spiritual Council of Yazidis in Georgia decided to revive the Yezidi script and use it for writing prayers, religious books, on the organization letterhead and in the Yazidi heraldry. Today, it is used by the Yazidi clergymen in the Yazidi temple of Sultan Ezid at Tbilisi, where the names of the Yazidi saints are written on walls in this alphabet. Furthermore, Dua'yêd Êzdiyan, a book containing a collection of Yazidi prayers, was written and published in the Yezidi alphabet.

Yezidi^{[1]}^{[2]} Official Unicode Consortium code chart (PDF)
	0	1	2	3	4	5	6	7	8	9	A	B	C	D	E	F
U+10E8x	𐺀	𐺁	𐺂	𐺃	𐺄	𐺅	𐺆	𐺇	𐺈	𐺉	𐺊	𐺋	𐺌	𐺍	𐺎	𐺏
U+10E9x	𐺐	𐺑	𐺒	𐺓	𐺔	𐺕	𐺖	𐺗	𐺘	𐺙	𐺚	𐺛	𐺜	𐺝	𐺞	𐺟
U+10EAx	𐺠	𐺡	𐺢	𐺣	𐺤	𐺥	𐺦	𐺧	𐺨	𐺩		𐺫	𐺬	𐺭		
U+10EBx	𐺰	𐺱														
Notes 1.As of Unicode version 18.0 2.Grey areas indicate non-assigned code points

== Comparison of Kurdish alphabets ==
Latin		Armenian	Cyrillic	Arabic				Yezidi	IPA
Hawar	Soviet	Armenian	Cyrillic	(isolated)	(final)	(medial)	(initial)	Yezidi	IPA
A, a	A, a	Ա, ա	А, а	ا	ـا		—	𐺀	[aː]
B, b	B, ʙ	Պ, պ	Б, б	ب	ـب	ـبـ	بـ	𐺁	[b]
C, c	Ç, ç	Ճ, ճ	Щ, щ	ج	ـج	ـجـ	جـ	𐺆	[d͡ʒ]
Ç, ç	C, c	Ջ, ջ	Ч, ч	چ	ـچ	ـچـ	چـ	𐺇	[t͡ʃ]
Ç, ç	Ꞓ, ꞓ	Չ, չ	Чʼ, чʼ	—				𐺈	[t͡ʃʰ]
D, d	D, d	Տ, տ	Д, д	د	ـد		د	𐺋	[d]
E, e	Ə, ə	Ա̈ ա̈	Ә, ә	ە	ـە		ە	𐺦	[ɛ]
Ê, ê	E, e	Է, է (Ե, ե)	(Э, э); (Note: At the beginning of a word.) (E, e)	ێ	ـێ	ـێـ	ێـ	𐺩	[eː]
F, f	F, f	Ֆ, ֆ	Ф, ф	ف	ـف	ـفـ	فـ	𐺙	[f]
G, g	G, g	Կ, կ	Г, г	گ	ـگ	ـگـ	گـ	𐺟	[ɡ]
H, h	H, h	Հ, հ	Һ, һ	ھ	—	ـھـ	ھ	𐺧	[h]
H, h	Ħ, ħ	Հʼ, հʼ	Һʼ, һʼ	ح	ـح	ـحـ	حـ	𐺉	[ħ]
I, i	Ь, ь	Ը, ը	Ь, ь	—				—	[ɘ], [ɘ̝], [ɪ]
Î, î	I, i	Ի, ի	И, и	ی	ـی	ـیـ	یـ	𐺨	[iː]
J, j	Ƶ, ƶ	Ժ, ժ	Ж, ж	ژ	ـژ		ژ	𐺐	[ʒ]
K, k	K, k	Գ, գ	К, к	ک	ـک	ـکـ	کـ	𐺝	[k]
K, k	Ⱪ, ⱪ	Ք, ք	Кʼ, кʼ	—				—	[c]
L, l	L, l	Լ, լ	Л, л	ل	ـل	ـلـ	لـ	𐺠	[l]
L, l; (ll)	L, l	Լʼ, լʼ	Лʼ, лʼ	ڵ	ـڵ	ـڵـ	ڵـ	𐺰	[ɫ]
M, m	M, m	Մ, մ	М, м	م	ـم	ـمـ	مـ	𐺡	[m]
N, n	N, n	Ն, ն	Н, н	ن	ـن	ـنـ	نـ	𐺢	[n]
O, o	O, o	Օ, օ (Ո, ո)	О, о	ۆ	ـۆ		ۆ	𐺥	[o], [o̟ː], [o̽ː], [oː]
—	Ɵ, ɵ (Note: Argues for the distinction of the letters. As can be used in the spelling of "Xoşe" instead of "Xweşe", for example. Soviet Latin: Xөşә.)	Էօ, էօ	—	—				—	[o̽ː]
P, p	P, p	Բ, բ	П, п	پ	ـپ	ـپـ	پـ	𐺂	[p], [pʰ]
P, p	Ҏ, ҏ	Փ, փ	Пʼ, пʼ	—				𐺃	[pˤ]
Q, q	Q, q	Գ‍̇, գ‍̇	Ԛ, ԛ	ق	ـق	ـقـ	قـ	𐺜	[q]
R, r	R, r	Ր, ր	Р, р	ر	ـر		—	𐺍	[ɾ]
R, r; (rr)	R, r	Ռ, ռ	Рʼ, рʼ	ڕ	ـڕ		ڕ	𐺎	[r]
S, s	S, s	Ս, ս	С, с	س	ـس	ـسـ	سـ	𐺑	[s]
Ş, ş	Ş, ş	Շ, շ	Ш, ш	ش	ـش	ـشـ	شـ	𐺒	[ʃ]
T, t	T, t	Դ, դ	Т, т	ت	ـت	ـتـ	تـ	𐺕	[t]
T, t	Ţ, ţ	Թ, թ	Тʼ, тʼ	—				—	[tʰ]
U, u	U, u	Ւ, ւ	Ӧ, ӧ	و	ـو		و	𐺣	[u]
Û, û	Y, y	Ու, ու	У, у	وو	ـوو		—	𐺣𐺣	[uː], [ʉː], [yː]
V, v	V, v	Վ, վ	В, в	ڤ	ـڤ	ـڤـ	ڤـ	𐺚 𐺛	[v]
W, w	W, w	—	Ԝ, ԝ	و	ـو		و	𐺤	[w]
X, x	X, x	Խ, խ	Х, х	خ	ـخ	ـخـ	خـ	𐺊	[x]
X, x	Ƣ, ƣ	—	Гʼ, гʼ	غ	ـغ	ـغـ	غـ	𐺘	[ɣ]
—	Ə́, ə́	—	Әʼ, әʼ	ع	ـع	ـعـ	عـ	𐺗	[ʕ]
Y, y	J, j	Յ, յ	Й, й	ی	ـی	ـیـ	یـ	𐺨	[j]
Z, z	Z, z	Զ, զ	З, з	ز	ـز		ز	𐺏	[z]

== See also ==
- Kurdish typography
- Romanization of Kurdish
- Help:IPA/Kurdish
