= Taufiq Wahby =

Kurdish politician from Iraq

- تۆفیق وەهبی
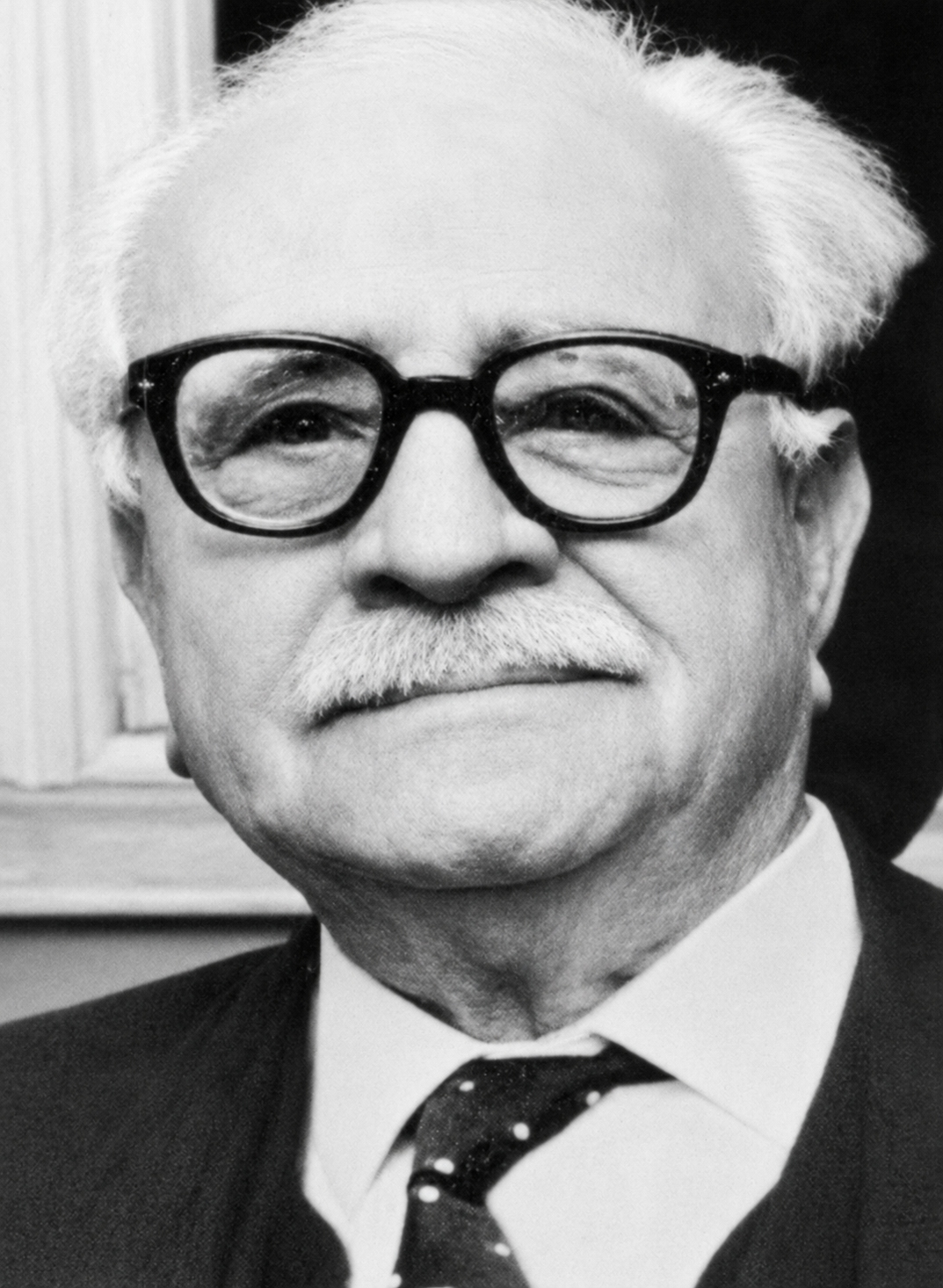
- Taufiq Wahby
- Born: January 1, 1891; Sulaymaniyah, Ottoman Empire
- Died: January 1, 1984 (aged 93); London, United Kingdom
- Occupations: Writer, Linguist, Politician
- Years active: 1920s–1980s
- Known for: Kurdish alphabet design, Yazidism research, Iraqi politics
- Notable work: "Destûrî Zimanî Kurdî", "Kurdish-English Dictionary"
- Spouse: Asia Taufiq Wahby

Taufiq Wahby (1891–1984, Kurdish: تۆفیق وەهبی) was a prominent Kurdish writer, linguist and politician. He first served in the Ottoman army as a colonel, but after the creation of Iraq by the British in 1920, he became an influential officer in the new Iraqi army. He also served eight terms in ministerial posts in the Iraqi government. He was instrumental in the design of a new Kurdish alphabet based on modified Arabic letters. Taufiq Wahbi also engaged in research concerning Yazidis and their religion.

Born in Sulaymaniyah in 1891, Wahby died in London in 1984, marking the end of a distinguished career spanning over six decades of Kurdish linguistic and political work.

== Books and publications ==
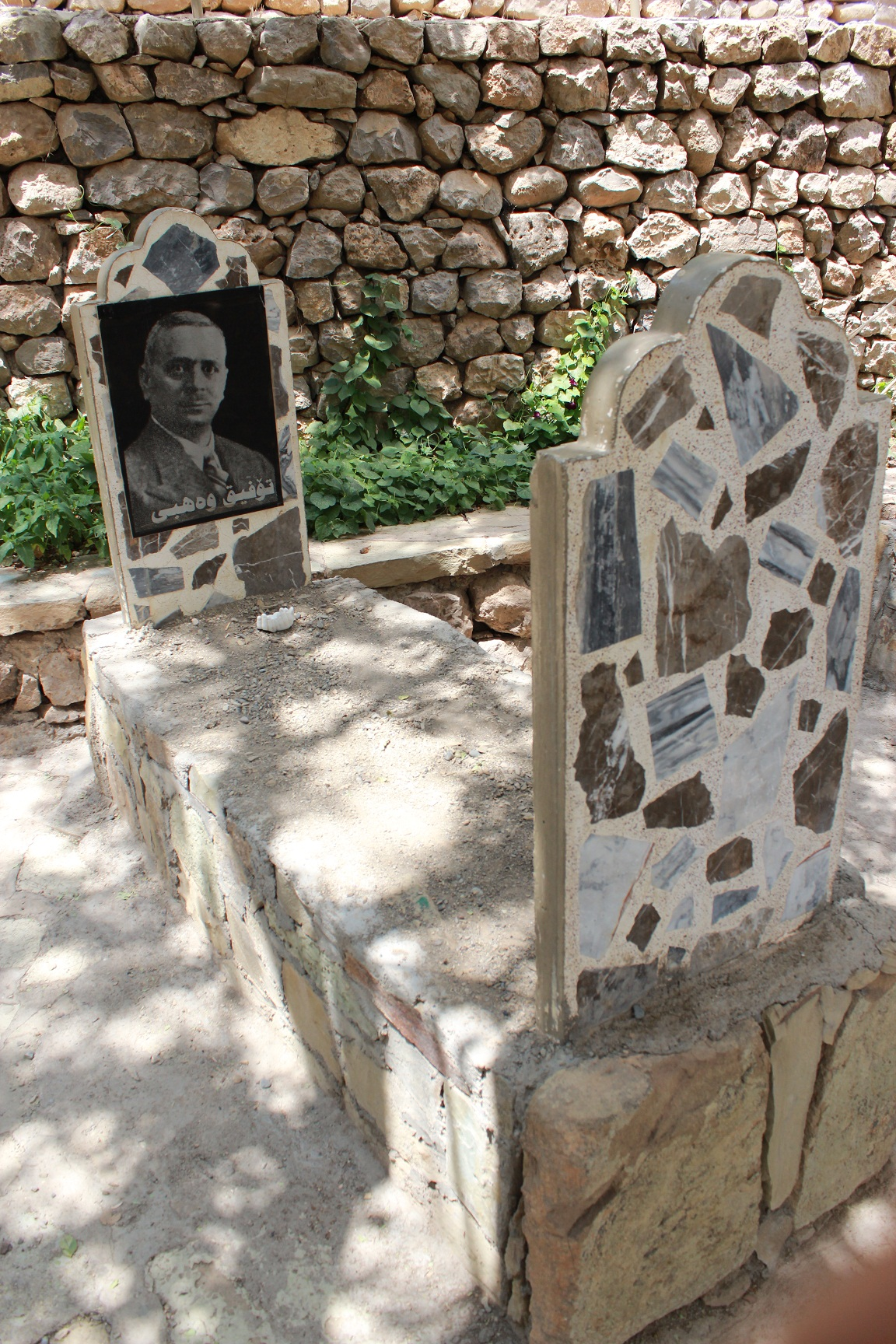
Grave of Taufiq Wahby

=== Grammar and linguistics ===
- "Destûrî Zimanî Kurdî" (Grammar of Kurdish Language), al-Haditha Publishers, Baghdad, 1929.
- "Xwêndewarî Baw" (Contemporary Literacy), al-Haditha Publishers, Baghdad, 1933.
- "Bunechekêy Kurdan û Bunchinêy Zimanî Kurdî" (The Origins of Kurds and the Foundation of Kurdish Language), 1964.
- "A Kurdish-English Dictionary", with C.J. Edmonds, 179 pp., Oxford Press, 1966.
- "Kurdish Studies", Kurdica Publishers, 1968.

=== Historical and religious studies ===
- "Peykere Berdînekanî Eshkeftî Gundik" (The Stone Sculptures of Gundik Cave), 1948.
- "The remnants of Mithraism in Hatra and Iraqi Kurdistan, and its traces in Yazidism: The Yazidis are not devil-worshippers", 1962.

== Legacy ==
Taufiq Wahby's contributions to Kurdish linguistics and literature are preserved in digital format through the VejinBooks Digital Library, making his works accessible to contemporary researchers and Kurdish language learners worldwide. His grammatical works remain foundational texts for understanding Kurdish linguistic structure and development.

== See also ==
- List of Kurdish scholars
- Kurdish language
- Kurdish literature
