= Urfa =

City in southeastern Turkey

- City
- Şanlıurfa
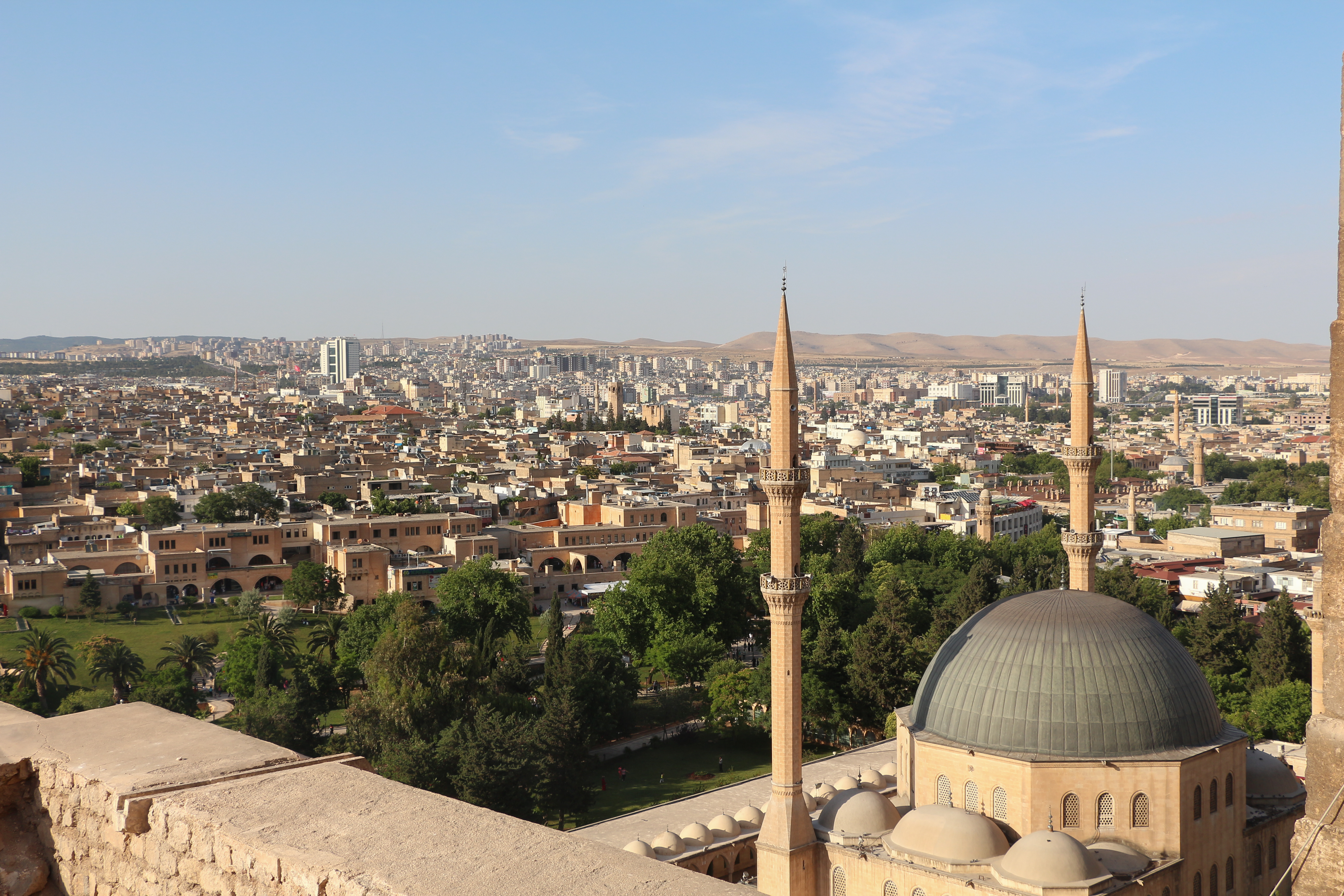
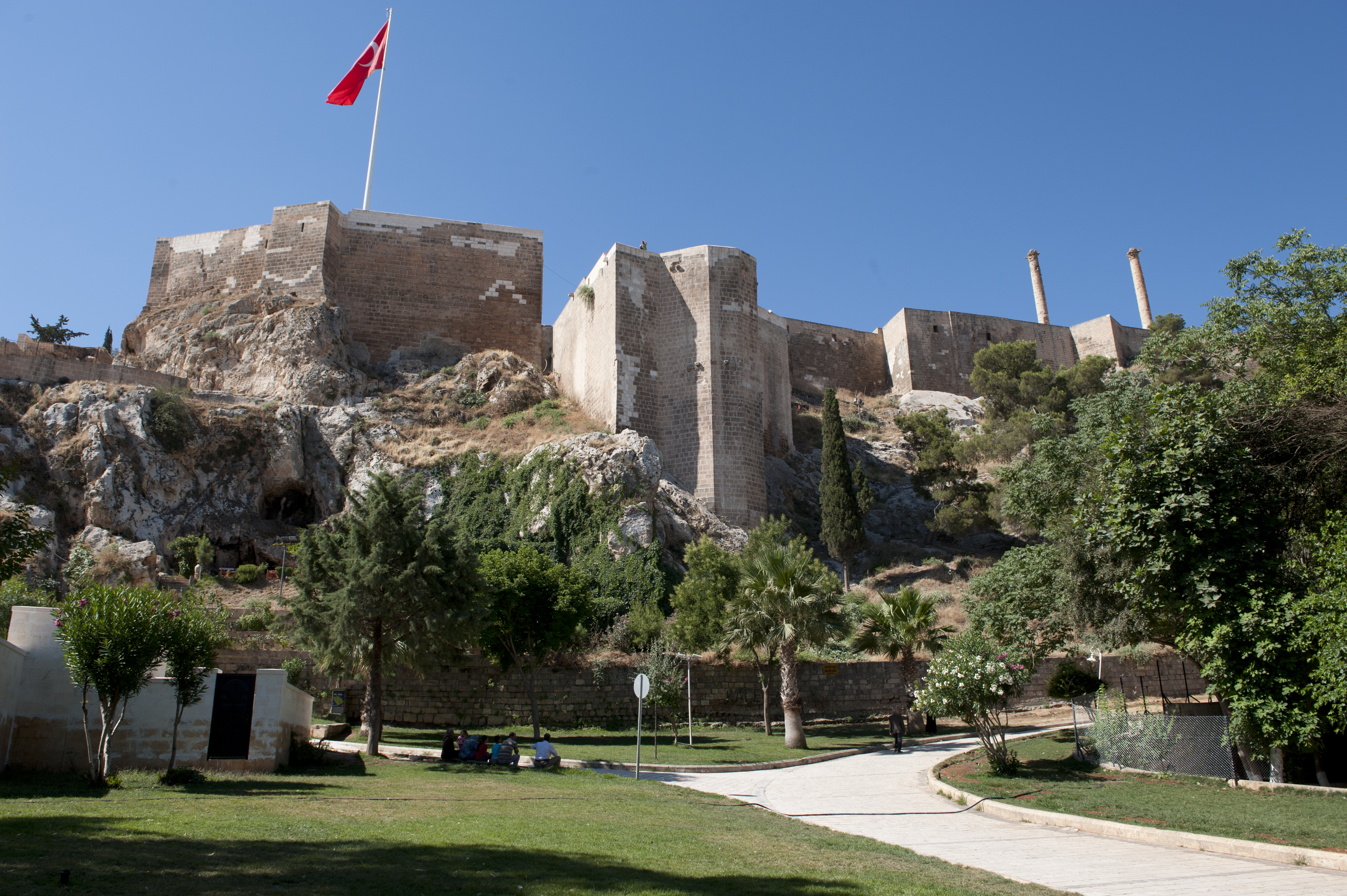
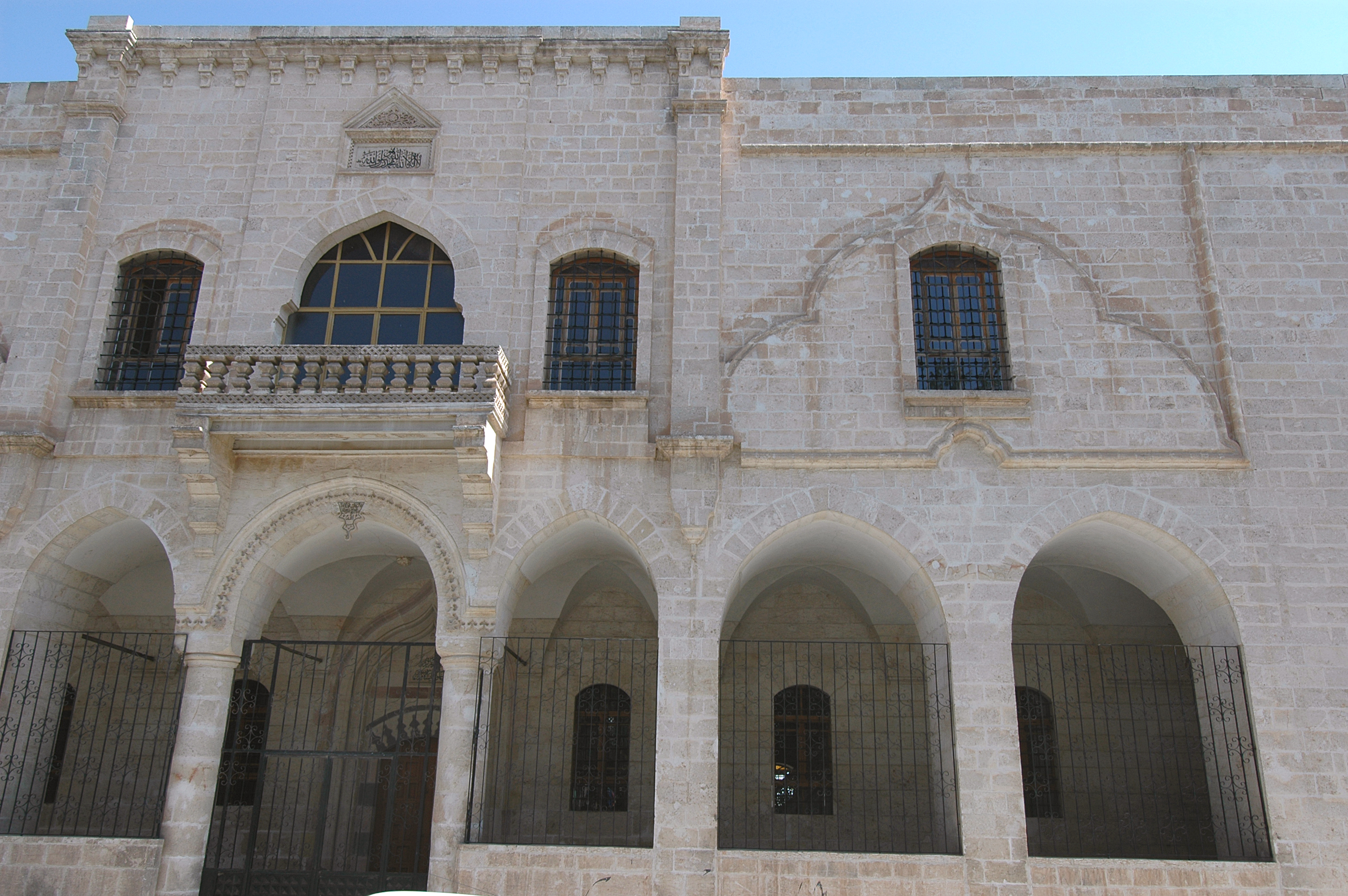
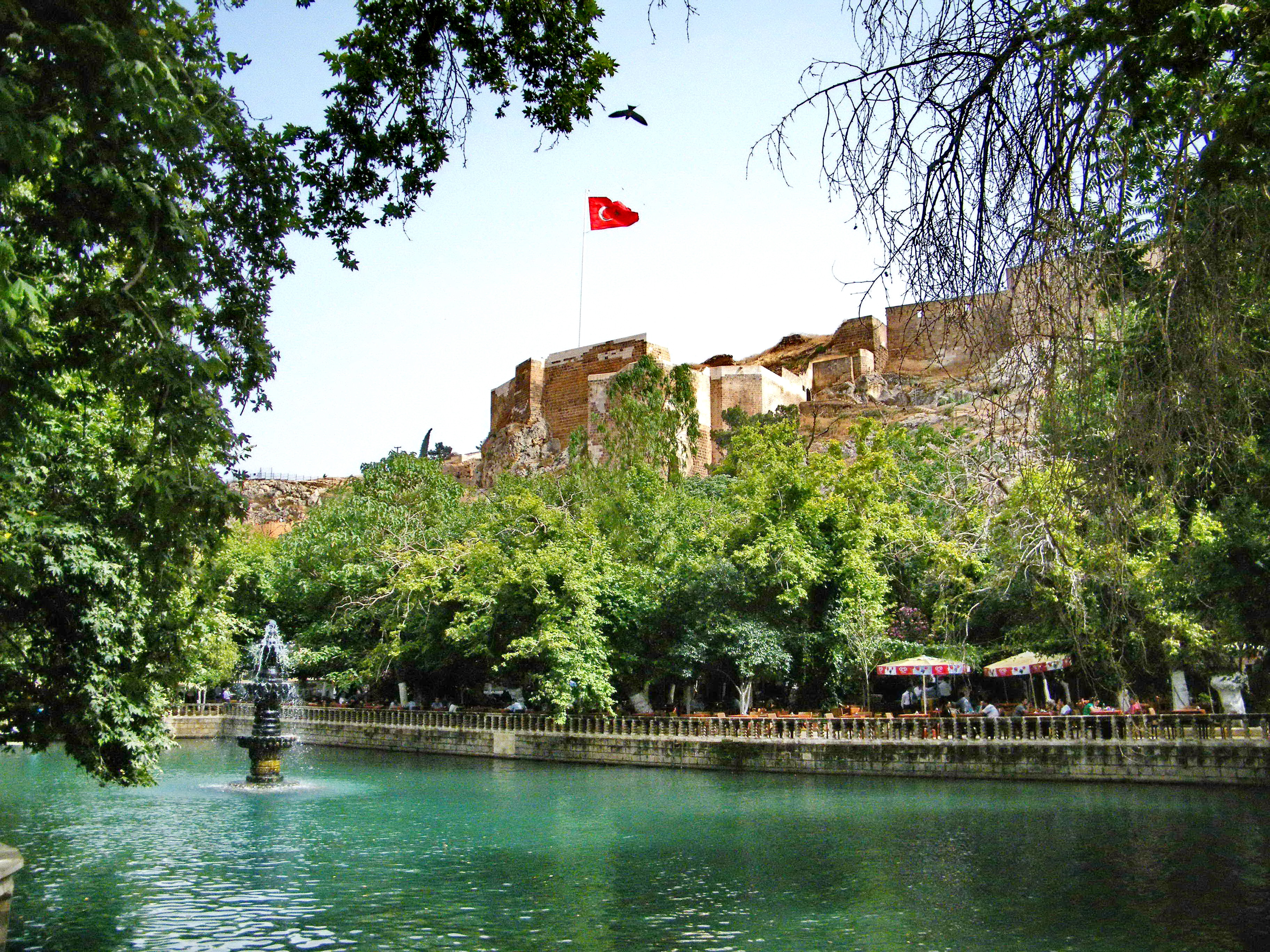
- Clockwise from top: View of Urfa, Urfa Castle, Ayn Zeliha, St. Johannes Prodromos Addai Church, Rizvaniye Mosque

- Emblem of Şanlıurfa Metropolitan Municipality
- Nicknames: "City of Prophets", "Urfa the Glorious"
- Location within Turkey Location within Near East
- Coordinates: 37°09′30″N 38°47′30″E
- Country: Turkey
- Province: Şanlıurfa
- Founded: 303/302 BC
- Founder: Seleucus I Nicator

Government
  - Mayor: Mehmet Kasım Gülpınar (Ind.)
  - Governor: Abdullah Erin
- Elevation: 477 m (1,565 ft)

Population (2022)
  - Urban: 596,637
- Time zone: UTC+3 (TRT)
- Website: www.sanliurfa.bel.tr

Urfa, officially called Şanlıurfa (Turkish pronunciation: [ʃanˈɫɯuɾfa] lit. 'Urfa the Glorious'), is a city in southeastern Turkey and the capital of Şanlıurfa Province. Urfa is situated on a plain about 80 km (50 mi) east of the Euphrates. Its climate features extremely hot, dry summers and cool, moist winters.

About 12 km (7 mi) northeast of the city is the famous Neolithic site of Göbekli Tepe, the world's oldest known temple, which was founded in the 10th millennium BC. The area was part of a network of the first human settlements where the agricultural revolution took place. Because of its association with Jewish, Christian, and Islamic history, and a legend recounting that it was the hometown of Abraham, Urfa is nicknamed the City of Prophets.

Religion is important in Urfa. The city "has become a center of fundamentalist Islamic beliefs" and "is considered one of the most devoutly religious cities in Turkey".

The city is located 30 miles from the Atatürk Dam, at the heart of the Southeast Anatolia Project, which draws thousands of job-seeking villagers to the city every year.

== Name ==
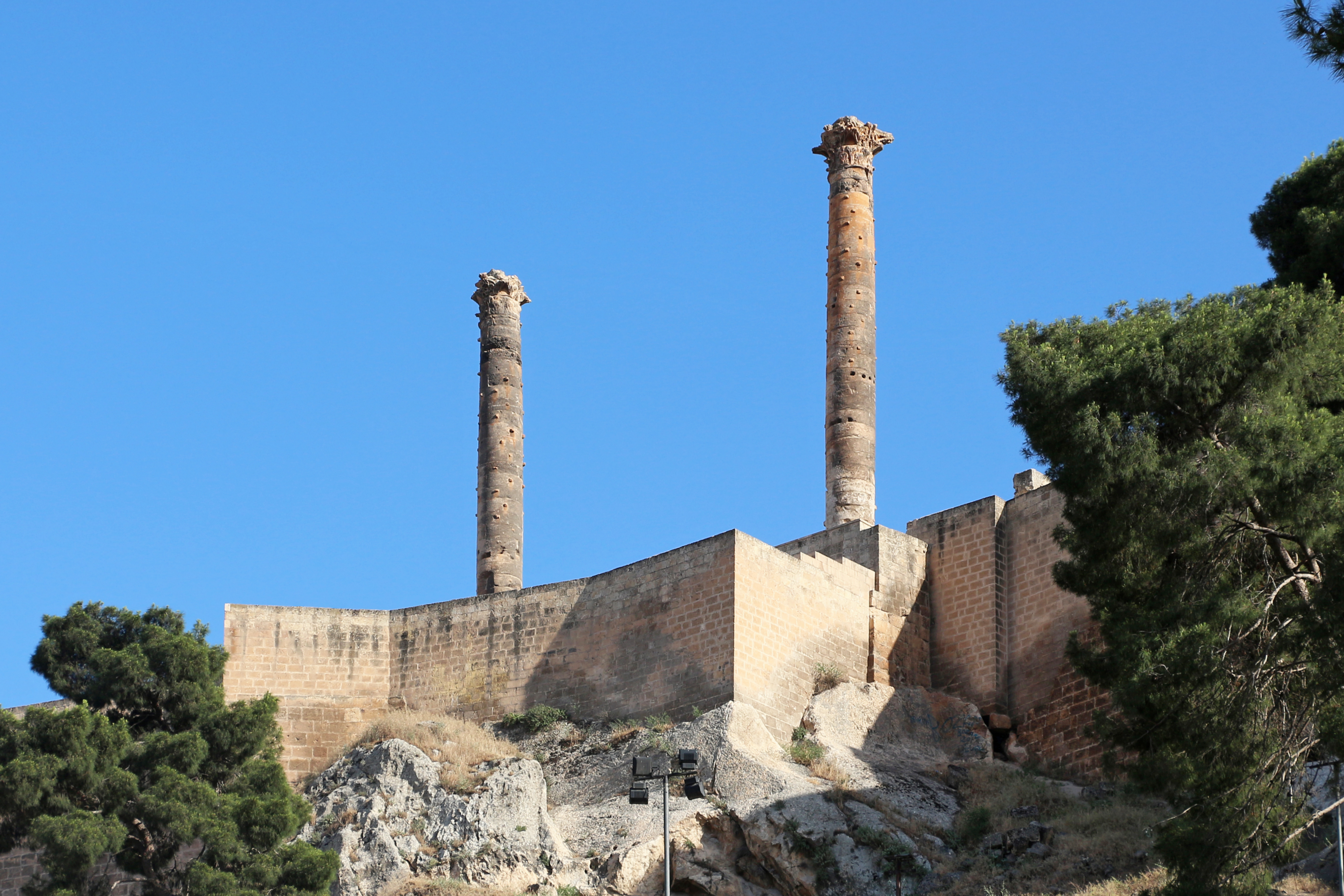
The heritage of Roman Edessa survives today in these columns at the site of Urfa Castle, dominating the skyline of the modern city of Urfa.

The earliest name of the city was Admaʾ (also written Adme, Admi, Admum; Imperial Aramaic: אדמא), recorded in Assyrian cuneiform in the Old Assyrian period. It is recorded in Syriac as ܐܕܡܐ Adme.

Modern names of the city are likely derived from Urhay or Orhay (Classical Syriac: ܐܘܪܗܝ, romanized: ʾŪrhāy / ʾŌrhāy), the site's Syriac name before the re-foundation of the settlement by Seleucus I Nicator. After the defeat of the Seleucids in the Seleucid–Parthian Wars, Edessa became capital of the Kingdom of Osroene, with a mixed Syriac and Hellenistic culture. The origin of the name of Osroene itself is probably related to Orhay. This originally Aramaic and Syriac name for the city may have been derived from the Persian name Khosrow.

The ancient town was refounded as a Hellenistic military settlement by Seleucus I Nicator in c. 303 BC, and named Edessa after the ancient capital of Macedonia, perhaps due to its abundant water, just like its Macedonian namesake. It was later renamed Callirrhoe or Antiochia on the Callirhoe (Ancient Greek: Ἀντιόχεια ἡ ἐπὶ Καλλιρρόης; Latin: Antiochia ad Callirhoem) in the 2nd century BC (found on Edessan coins struck by Antiochus IV Epiphanes, r. 175–164 BC).

Fikret Işıltan states that although the city was renamed Edessa under the Seleucids, the indigenous Syriac population continued to refer to it as Urhâi, and the local inhabitants never fully adopted the Greek name. According to Işıltan, the native name later passed into Arabic as al-Ruhā.

After Antiochus IV's reign, the name of the city reverted to Edessa, in Greek, and appears in Armenian as Urha or Ourha (Ուռհա), in Aramaic (Syriac) as Urhay or Orhay (Classical Syriac: ܐܘܪܗܝ, romanized: ʾŪrhāy / ʾŌrhāy), in local Neo-Aramaic (Turoyo) as Urhoy, in Arabic as ar-Ruhā (الرُّهَا), in the Kurdish language as Riha, Latinized as Rohais, and finally adopted into Turkish as Urfa or Şanlıurfa ("Glorious Urfa"), its present name.

Mustafa Ayataç states that the city's name evolved into Urfa following the Turkish conquest in the early 11th century.

James Silk Buckingham claimed that in earlier times, the city was known as Ruha, and with the Arabic article, it became Ar-Ruha, evolving into Urha, and eventually Urfa. Carsten Niebuhr observed that Turks called the city El-Rohha in the 18th century, although Buckingham who later visited Urfa, disagreed and noted that all Turks, and most Arabs and Kurds in the surrounding countryside called it Urfa, while a small portion of the Christians called it as the former.

In 1984, the Turkish National Assembly granted Urfa the title "Şanlı", meaning "glorious", in honor of its citizens' resistance against British and French troops at the end of the First World War, hence the present name "Şanlıurfa".

== History ==
=== Prehistory ===
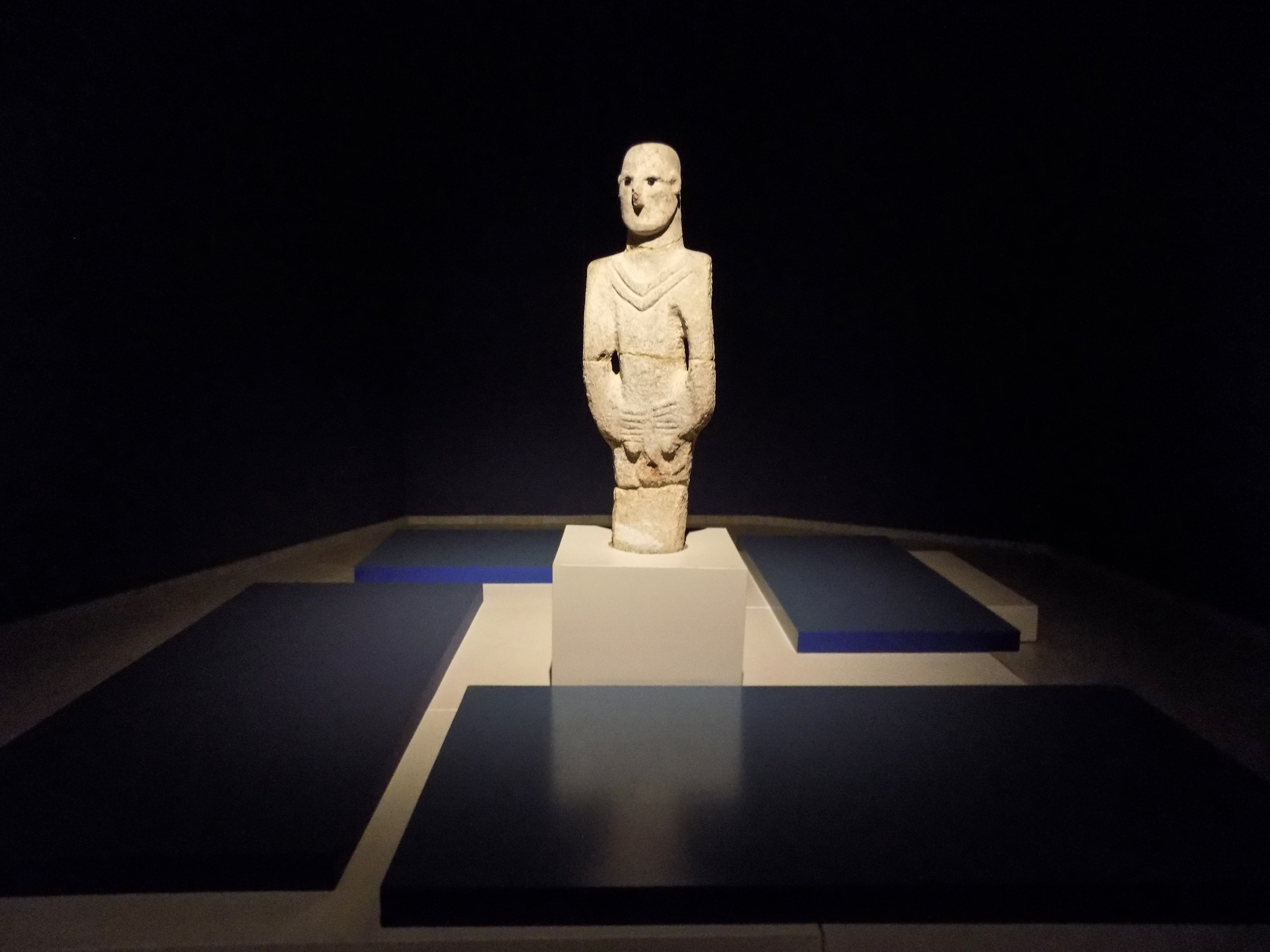
Urfa Man, Pre-Pottery Neolithic, c. 9000 BC. Şanlıurfa Museum.

Urfa shares the Balikh River Valley region with two other significant Neolithic sites at Nevalı Çori and Göbekli Tepe. Settlements in the area originated around 9000 BC as a PPNA Neolithic sites located near Abraham's Pool (site name: Balıklıgöl).

There is no written evidence for earlier settlement at the site, but Urfa's favorable commercial and geographical placement suggests that there was a smaller settlement present prior to 303 BC. Perhaps Orhai's absence from earlier written sources is due to the settlement having been small and unfortified prior to the Seleucid period.

In prehistoric times, the Urfa Region was attractive for human habitation because of its dense grazing areas and the presence of wild animals on migration routes. As a result, the area became densely populated, particularly in the Neolithic period.

In Urfa itself, there was a prehistoric settlement at Yeni Mahalle Höyüğü (aka Balıklıgöl Höyüğü), located immediately north of Balıklıgöl in the heart of the old town. Now buried under single-story houses, the site was accidentally discovered during road construction in the 1990s and then excavated in 1997 by the Şanlıurfa Museum Directorate. The findings included flint tools, arrowheads dated to the early Pre-Pottery Neolithic B phase, and two round buildings with terrazzo floors. Animal bones found at the site indicate hunting activity, and charred seed samples indicate that the villagers cultivated wheat and barley. The village at Yeni Mahalle is radiocarbon dated to roughly 9400–8600 BCE.

==== Bronze Age ====
During the Uruk expansion period, around 3200 BC, the villages of Urfa and Harran began to transform into cities. By the Early Bronze Age (2900–2600 BCE) Urfa had grown into a walled city of 200ha. This city is located at the archeological site Kazane Tepe adjacent to modern Urfa.

A much later artifact is a black stone pedestal with a double bull relief, found at a hill called Külaflı Tepe in the former village of Cavşak in the 1950s when the village was being evacuated to build a base for the Urfa Brigade. The pedestal contains an inscription with an invocation to the god Tarhunza and mentions a city whose name is only partly visible, but which Bahattin Çelik restores as "Umalia", in the country of Bit Adini.

=== City of Edessa ===
Urfa was founded as a city under the name Edessa by the Seleucid king Seleucus I Nicator in 302 or 303 BC. Seleucus named the city Edessa after the ancient capital of Macedonia.

Ancient sources describe Seleucid Edessa as following the typical plan for Hellenistic military colonies: its streets were laid out in a grid pattern, with four main streets that intersected each other. There were four city gates, and the main citadel was outside the walls. Macedonian soldiers were settled in the new city, but they never formed a majority of its population. The city's culture remained predominantly Semitic (specifically Aramaic), and any Hellenization was minimal.

Edessa was an important commercial center in the 3rd and 2nd centuries BC. Previously, the main east-west trade route across Upper Mesopotamia had gone through Harran, but the founding of Edessa caused that route to shift northwards.

In 132 BC, following the decline of the Seleucids, Edessa became the capital of the kingdom of Osrhoene, which was ruled by the Abgarids. The Abgarids were generally allied with the Parthian Empire and were under Parthian cultural influence as well.

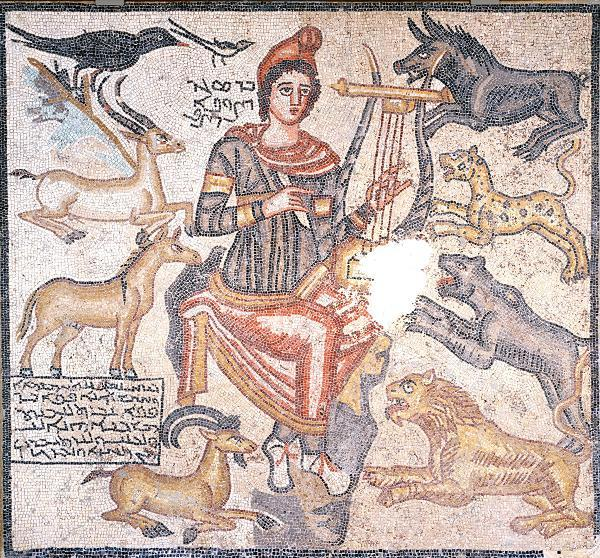
Mosaic of Orpheus from Roman Edessa, c. 200 AD

In the early second century AD, Abgar VII supported the Roman emperor Trajan's campaign in Mesopotamia and received him "sumptuously" at his court, but later rebelled. In retaliation, the Romans captured and destroyed Edessa, and Abgar VII was killed. The Romans installed a Parthian prince, Parthamaspates, on the Edessan throne as a puppet ruler in 117, but the Abgarids were later restored to power. Similarly, the Parthians captured Edessa in 163 and installed Wa'el bar Sharu as a puppet king. The deposed Ma'nu VIII went to the Romans, who took Edessa in 165 and restored Ma'nu to power. In 166, Osrhoene became a Roman client kingdom.

Ma'nu VIII died in 177 and was succeeded by Abgar VIII, also called Abgar the Great. Abgar was stripped of most of his domains except for Edessa, and Osrhoene became a Roman province, when his ally Pescennius Niger lost the civil war to Septimius Severus. Abgar devoted his remaining time to fostering arts and learning. In 201, much of Edessa was destroyed by a major flood. According to the Chronicle of Edessa, over 2,000 people died. Abgar granted a remission of taxes for people affected by the flood and immediately began a large-scale reconstruction project of the city after the old Seleucid plan. Abgar repaired the old royal palace by the river, which had been damaged by the flood, but he also built a new palace on higher ground.

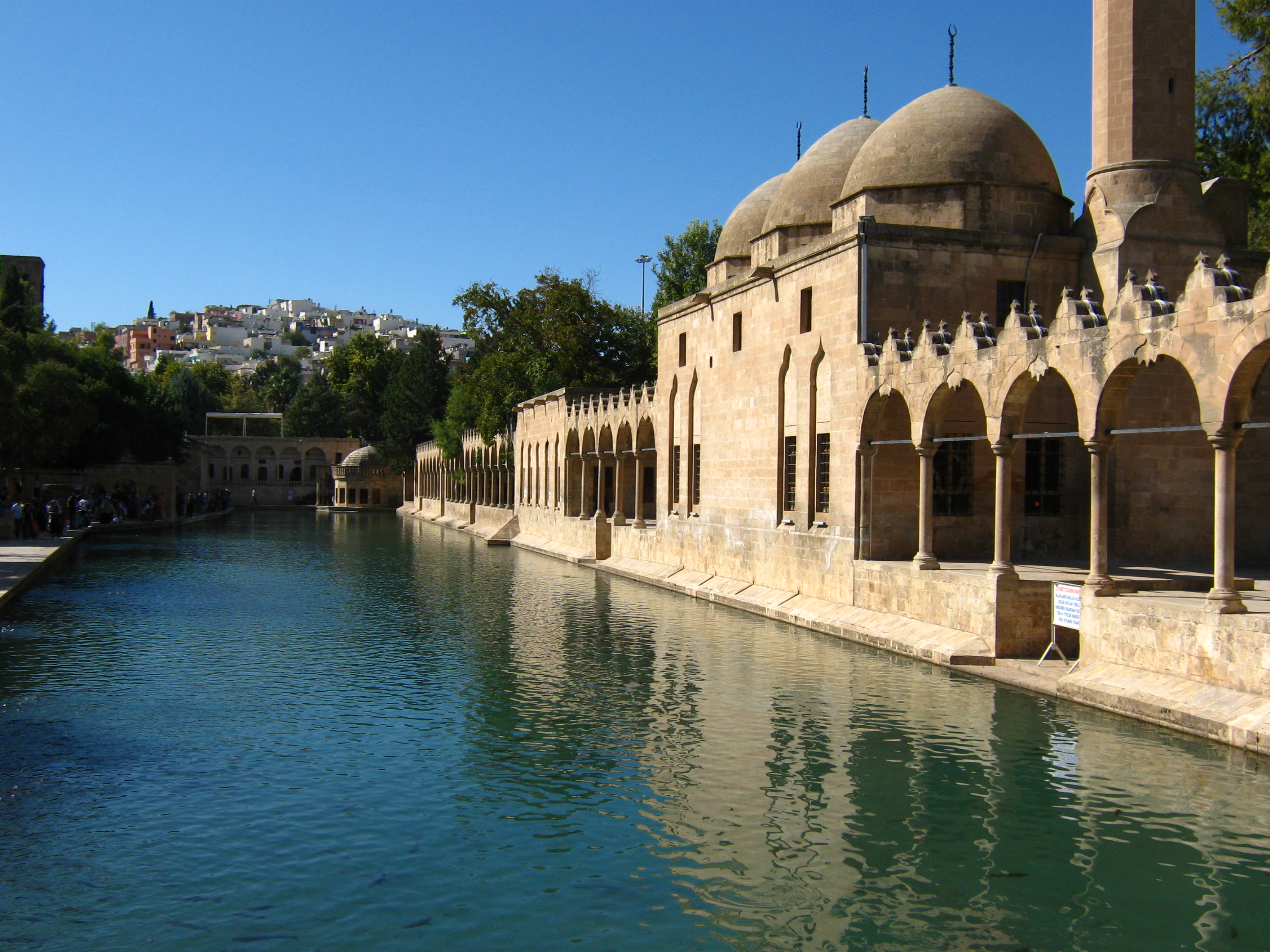
The sacred carp of Balıklıgöl: a tradition which goes back to ancient times

Ancient Edessa was an eclectic melting pot of different religious groups. Unlike Harran, where the cult of the moon god Sin predominated, the people of Edessa worshipped a whole pantheon of gods that can generally be identified with planets. In addition to polytheists, Edessa also had a prominent Jewish community. Many of Edessa's Jews were merchants, involved in long-distance trade between the Persian Gulf and the Mediterranean. By the end of the 2nd century, a small Christian community had appeared in Edessa. Christianity also resonated with several religious themes already present in Edessa – besides the concept of a virgin mother and child, there was also the concept of a divine trinity and a hope for life after death. Edessa's Jewish community was probably partly responsible for the rapid spread of Christianity in the city. Abgar the Great reportedly converted to Christianity around the turn of the 3rd century, which if true would make Edessa the first Christian polity in the world.

More religions joined the mix during the 3rd century. One was the Bardaisanites, founded by the important philosopher Bardaisan who Abgar the Great was a patron of. Another was the Elkesaites, a syncretic religion that combined elements of Christianity, Judaism, and paganism. There was already an active Manichaean community in Edessa during Mani's lifetime; there is a reference in the Cologne Mani Codex to a letter he wrote to his followers in Edessa. Manichaeism's spread to Edessa was attributed to two of Mani's disciples named Addai and Thomas. Edessa's Manichaean community remained prominent until the 5th century.

==== Roman rule ====
Abgar the Great died in 212 and was succeeded by Abgar IX, also called Severus as a sign of Roman influence. Abgar IX only reigned for a year – in 213, he was summoned to Rome by the emperor Caracalla, who then had him murdered. In 214, Caracalla made Edessa a Roman colony, officially ending any autonomy the city had. A son of Abgar IX, known as Ma'nu IX, appears to have been nominally a king until 240; he received an embassy from India in 218, during the reign of Elagabalus, but he did nothing else of note. The monarchy seems to have been restored to power at some point – and Abgar IX was apparently king until 248, when the emperor Philip the Arab had him banished after Edessa rebelled.

In 260, the Sasanian emperor Shapur I defeated the Romans in the Battle of Edessa and captured the emperor. However, either Shapur never actually captured the city or he only held it for a very short time – it is not listed among the cities he captured in his inscription on the Ka'ba-ye Zartosht, and in the aftermath of the battle he had to bribe Edessa's garrison to let his army pass unmolested.

As a result of Diocletian's reorganization of the empire in 293, a state-run factory was built at Edessa to make weapons and equipment for the soldiers stationed along the border. In 298, after Galerius Maximianus's victory over the Sasanians, Edessa was made capital of the new province of Osrhoene. It served as a military base in the Mesopotamian limes, although it was secondary to Nisibis in that system.

==== Late antiquity ====
In the 4th through 6th centuries AD, Edessa went through arguably its period of greatest prosperity. It was again an important commercial center, and merchants grew rich on trade in luxury goods from the east, particularly silk. As with later periods, the city had a council of notable citizens who were at least partly in charge of local government and administration. In the 5th century there were three different theological schools in Edessa: the School of the Syrians (affiliated with the patriarchate of Antioch), the School of the Armenians, and the famous School of the Persians (whose teachers were not actually Persians but rather members of the Church of the East). The School of the Persians was closed down in 489 and its staff relocated to Nisibis. There were many churches in the city and monasteries in the area. Just outside the walls were several infirmaries and hospitals.

When the Roman emperor Jovian surrendered Nisibis to the Sasanians in 363, an influx of refugees came to Edessa, including many Christians. One of these refugees was the writer and theologian Ephrem the Syrian, who was a co-founder of the School of the Persians in Edessa. As Christianity gained more of a presence in Edessa, the pagan planet-worshippers increasingly emigrated to Harran.

By the early 6th century, a small lake had formed on the west side of the city. In 525, a flood destroyed part of the western city wall and damaged some of the city. Afterwards, a deep ditch was dug on the north and east sides of the city to act as a flood channel. In normal weather, a low dam kept the Daisan river in its original course, but if the dam overflowed, then the floodwaters would flow through the artificial channel instead of into the city. At some point later on, the flood channel became the normal course of the river.

Edessa successfully held out during a siege in 544. In 609, however, the Sasanian emperor Khosrow II captured Edessa during his campaign in Mesopotamia. Many of the city's Monophysites were deported to Iran. In 628, the Byzantine emperor Heraclius captured Edessa.

=== Age of Islam ===
Urfa surrendered to the Rashidun general Iyad ibn Ghanm in 639 without resistance, supposedly when Iyad "stood at its gate riding a brown horse" according to al-Baladhuri. Several versions of the terms of surrender appear in historical sources, mentioning the citizens would be responsible for "repairing 'bridges and roads'". The pact also guaranteed that the city's Christians would keep ownership of the cathedral. Sometime shortly after Urfa submitted to Muslim rule, a mosque was built in the city, although its location is unknown.

In the early centuries of Arab rule, and particularly under the Umayyads, Urfa was still a major Christian city. It formed part of the province of Diyar Mudar. The city reportedly had 300 or 360 churches, and there were many monasteries. The population was mostly Syrian Orthodox but with significant Melkite and Jewish minorities; there were relatively few Muslims. The city was led by a group of distinguished citizens, including magnates and agricultural landowners, who "formed a partly self-governing body" that dealt with the caliphal government rather than the bishop. Some of the leading families in this period included the Gūmāyē, the Telmaḥrāyē, and the Ruṣāfāyē.

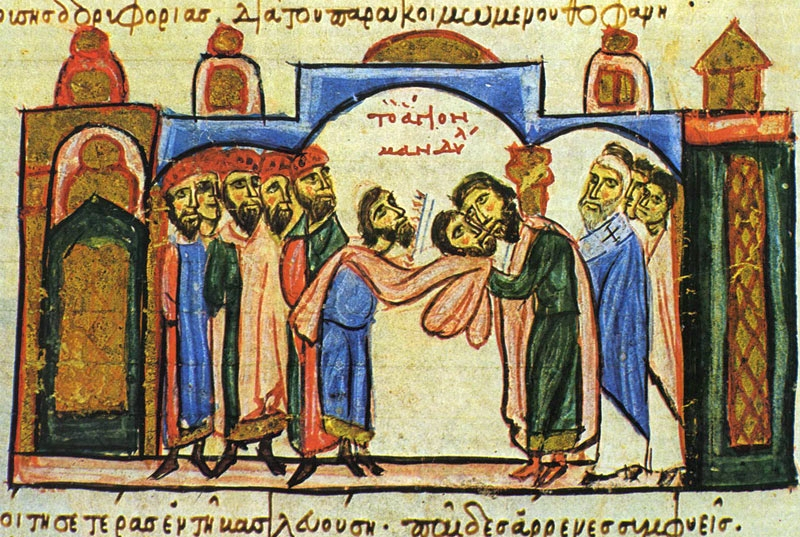
Image from the Chronicle of John Skylitzes showing the surrender of the Mandylion to the Byzantine army in 943.

During the reign of the Abbasid caliph al-Mansur, the city walls were demolished after the local Muslim governor revolted. The old walls had already been damaged by floods in the 7th and 8th centuries. In 812, Urfa's citizens had to pay a large sum to the anti-Abbasid rebel Nasr ibn Shabath al-Uqayli to prevent him from attacking the unprotected city. Afterwards, the citizens had new defensive walls built around the city. According to Bar Hebraeus, the walls were commissioned by someone named Abu Shaykh and paid for by the citizens. The walls and towers visible today belong to this rebuilding effort, albeit with later renovations. The citadel was likely begun at the same time, probably with the addition of a moat on the south side.

When the caliph al-Ma'mun came to power in 813, he dispatched his general Tahir ibn Husayn to Urfa to put down Nasr ibn Shabath's rebellion. The rebels besieged Tahir's forces in Urfa, but the local civilians (one of them was the future Syriac church leader Dionysius I Telmaharoyo) supported the soldiers and the siege was unsuccessful. Tahir's troops later mutinied, however, and he was forced to flee to Raqqa; he later appointed someone named 'Abd al-A'la as governor of Urfa. In 825, while Tahir's son Abdallah was governor of al-Jazira, his brother Muhammad enacted a series of anti-Christian policies in Urfa. He ordered the destruction of several churches, claiming that they had illegally been built after the Muslim conquest. That same year, he also had a new mosque built in the tetrapylon in front of the city's Melkite cathedral. Before its conversion into a mosque, the tetrapylon had been a meeting place for church leaders. The locations of the mosque and cathedral are unknown.

In the spring of 943, the Byzantine army campaigned in upper Mesopotamia, capturing several cities and either threatening Urfa or, according to Symeon Magister, besieging it outright. The Byzantines demanded that the mandylion (called al-mandīl in Arabic), by now a famous Christian relic, be handed over to the emperor. In return, the city would be spared and 200 Muslim prisoners would be released. With permission from the caliph al-Muttaqi, the people of Edessa handed over the mandylion and signed a truce with the Byzantines. The mandylion was translated to Constantinople; it arrived "triumphantly" on 15 August 944.

=== 11th century ===
The Numayrid emir Waththab ibn Sabiq declared independence in 990 and annexed Edessa early in his reign. Waththab appointed his cousin 'Utayr as governor of the city. 'Utayr installed someone named Ahmad ibn Muhammad as his na'ib (deputy) here, but then later had him assassinated. This evidently made 'Utayr unpopular with the locals, since Ahmad had treated them well. In 1025/6 (416 AH), the city's inhabitants rebelled and appealed to Nasr ad-Dawla, the Marwanid emir of Diyar Bakr. At first, Nasr ad-Dawla appointed someone named Zangi to be his deputy in Edessa, but Zangi died in 1027. Meanwhile, 'Utayr had been assassinated. This time, Nasr ad-Dawla ended up appointing two deputies to jointly control Edessa: he chose 'Utayr's son, known only by the nasab "Ibn 'Utayr", to be in charge of the main citadel, while he appointed a different Numayrid named Shibl ad-Dawla to be in charge of the smaller citadel – i.e. the converted east gate, now the Bey Kapısı.

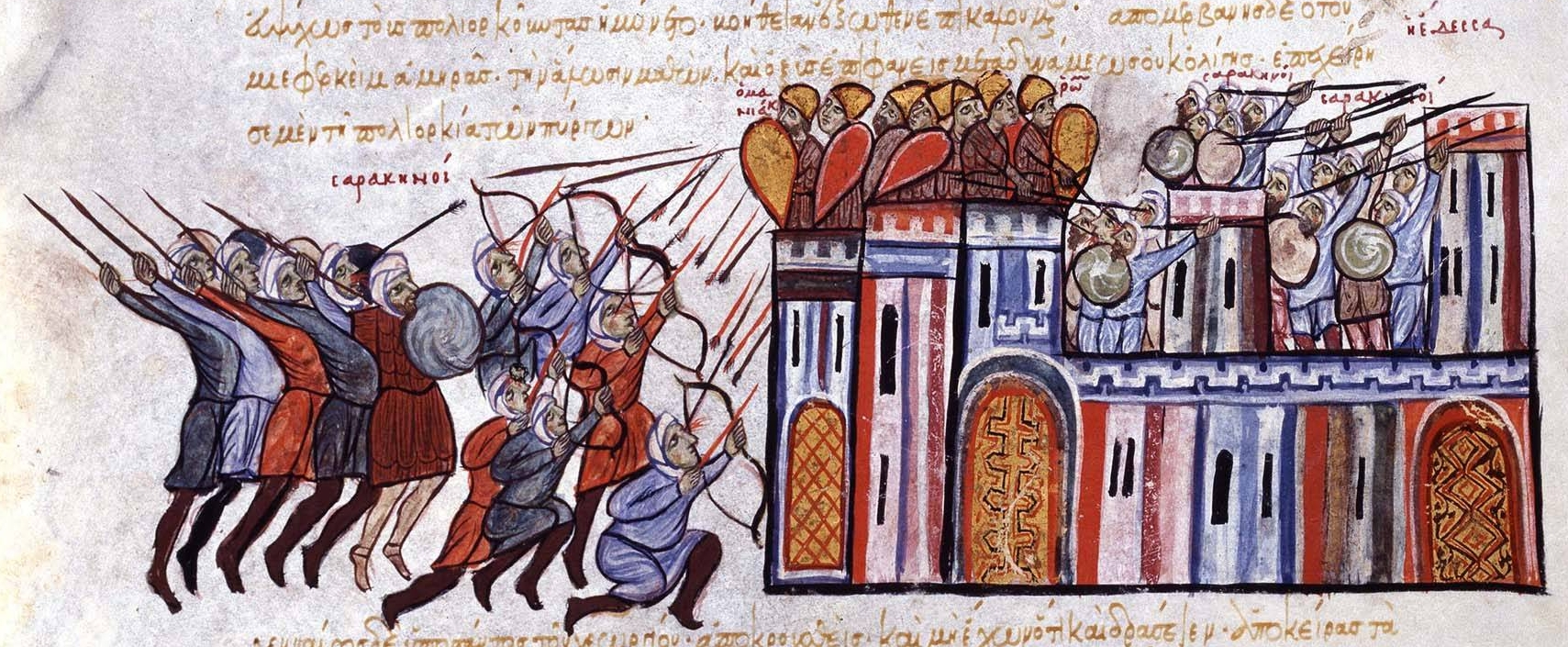
Miniature from the History of John Skylitzes showing George Maniakes defending Edessa from Nasr ad-Dawla's counterattack.

In October 1031, the Byzantine general George Maniakes conquered Edessa. This would ultimately be the last significant territorial acquisition by the Byzantine Empire in Mesopotamia. The accounts of this event differ heavily. One version says that Ibn 'Utayr had entered into negotiations with Maniakes, intending to sell him the citadel. His desire to sell was apparently motivated by a threat from Shibl ad-Dawla. In John Skylitzes's version, however, Maniakes had bribed Salman, a deputy of Nasr ad-Dawla's, into surrendering the city to him in the middle of the night. If this was the case, then Salman either had some authority over Ibn 'Utayr or had otherwise deposed him.

Whoever Maniakes had been negotiating with, Byzantine forces gained control of some of the fortifications but not the rest of the city. Exactly which parts Maniakes had taken control of are unclear – Skylitzes described Maniakes had taken possession of "three heavily fortified towers", but his description of Edessa's geography is completely inaccurate and he clearly had never been to the city himself. Matthew of Edessa's account, which is more reliable, mentions "three citadels"; the upper citadel may have been one of them. Maniakes may have already gained control of the upper citadel. That winter, Nasr ad-Dawla came with an army in an attempt to drive out the Byzantines. Nasr ad-Dawla tried to besiege the Byzantine positions but was unsuccessful and decided to loot the city and tear down buildings, then burn the city to the ground while retreating with camels carrying off precious objects. According to Skylitzes, Maniakes was able to then capture the citadel and, summoning external reinforcements, secure the whole city.

Maniakes remained in charge of Edessa for several years and, according to Honigmann and Bosworth, appears to have been relatively autonomous from the Byzantines, merely sending an annual tribute to Constantinople. On the other hand, while Skylitzes does mention that "Maniakes sent an annual tribute of 50 pounds [of gold] to the emperor", Niccolò Zorzi remarks that this "does not necessarily imply that Edessa 'enjoyed a certain amount of independence from Byzantium'". The citadel became known as "Maniakes's citadel" at some point.

In May 1036, the Numayri prince Ibn Waththab plundered the city and took the patricius of Edessa as prisoner, but the fortress remained in the hands of the Byzantine garrison. A peace treaty was reached in 1037; under its terms, Edessa came directly under Byzantine control and it was refortified. Edessa now became an important Byzantine command placed under a series of katepanos and dukes. The "duchy" of Edessa probably comprised the whole area beyond the Euphrates under their control with several fortresses north of the river. The city "was still inhabited by many Christians" at this point.

In 1065-6 and 1066-7, the city was attacked by the Turkish leader Khurasan-Salar. For 50 days beginning on 10 March 1071, Urfa was besieged by the Seljuk sultan Alp Arslan. Alp Arslan eventually lifted the siege in return for a large payment and possibly also the submission of its ruler, the doux Basilios Alousianos (son of Alusian of Bulgaria). After the Battle of Manzikert, Edessa was intended to be handed over to the Seljuks, but the Byzantine emperor Romanos Diogenes was deposed and in the political chaos its katepano Paulus ended up siding with the new emperor.

In 1077 or 1078, Basil Apokapes besieged and captured Edessa, displacing the Byzantine governor Leo Diabatenos. He was an agent of Philaretos Brachamios, the main Byzantine agent in the region who governed from Marash; however, Basil ruled Edessa independently. In 1081-2, an amir named Khusraw unsuccessfully besieged the city. After Basil's death in 1083, the citizens of Edessa elected an Armenian named Smbat to succeed him. Smbat was in charge for six months before Philaretos came in person on 23 September 1083. He appointed a Greek eunuch as governor and gave him the title parakoimomenos; this eunuch was later assassinated by an official named Barsauma.

However, Edessa was in a particularly vulnerable position "caught between two blocks of Uqaylid territory", and it was particularly vulnerable to the Seljuks. In 1086-7, the Seljuk sultan Malik Shah I sent his general Buzan to take the city while he himself campaigned in Syria. A three-month siege followed, with Barsauma defending the city. The city surrendered in March 1087 and Buzan appointed a Seljuk commander to head the citadel. At some point, an Armenian named Toros in charge of the city administration – according to the Syriac Chronicle of 1234, this happened in 1087, while Matthew of Edessa wrote that it happened after Buzan's death in 1094. Toros appears to have begun a rebuilding project on the Bey Kapısı fortress, but it wasn't finished until after his rule. Meanwhile, Malik Shah had died in 1092 and a Seljuk dynastic crisis had broken out. In 1094, Malik Shah's brother Tutush demanded the city's surrender, but both Toros and the Seljuk citadel commander refused. Tutush's forces seized the citadel and made their encampment on the west side of the city. Fearing an attack from them, Toros apparently tried to cut the citadel off by building a wall between it and the city. After Tutush died in 1095, however, his forces abandoned the citadel and Toros now took control of the whole city as a de facto independent ruler.

During the 11th century, there was a large influx of Armenian immigrants into the region, especially the towns. In Urfa, they supplanted Syrians as the leading citizens and wealthiest landowners.

=== County of Edessa ===
A map of the County of Edessa

Urfa was capital of the crusader County of Edessa for about half a century beginning in 1098. The crusaders' subjects were a mix of Armenians and Syrians. In Urfa itself, Armenians were the dominant group. The crusaders themselves don't seem to have undertaken much construction in Urfa. The only extant structure that can be attributed to them is the southernmost tower of the Bey Kapısı, on the east side of the city walls. This was completing the rebuilding that Toros had begun before the crusaders seized Edessa and was finished in 1122-3, while the count Joscelin I was in captivity at Harput.

==== Sieges of 1144 and 1146 ====
The County of Edessa had survived largely because their Muslim rivals were disunited. The rise of a single powerful Muslim rival – namely Imad ad-Din Zangi, the crafty atabeg of Mosul – spelled disaster for the county. The tipping point came in late 1144, when Joscelin II left Edessa with a big chunk of his soldiers to assist Zengi's rival Kara Arslan.

Upon becoming aware of the city's weakness, Zengi led a series of forced marches and laid siege to the city on 24 November. By 24 December, he had successfully gained entry to the city; the citadel fell two days later on the 26th. Zengi's forces spared the native Christian population and their churches, but the Franks were killed and their churches destroyed. Zengi then appointed Zayn ad-Din Ali Küçük, the commander of his guard, as governor of the city.

The fall of Edessa was a direct motivator for the Second Crusade. Christian pilgrims returning to Europe brought news of the city's conquest, and emissaries from the crusader states also came to appeal for help. The pope responded by issuing the papal bull Quantum praedecessores on 1 December 1145, which directly called for another crusade. Meanwhile, in the Muslim world, news of this victory made Zengi a hero. The caliph gave him many gifts and titles, including al-malik al-mansūr – "the victorious king".

In May 1146, there was a plot by Urfa's Armenian community to overthrow the Turks and restore the city to Joscelin II. The Turks suppressed this plot and settled 300 Jewish families in the city. However, after Zengi was assassinated on 14 September 1146, the Armenians again conspired with Joscelin II to take the city. Sometime in October, Joscelin II and Baldwin of Marash came and laid siege to the city. This second siege proved far more destructive than the first. The Franks succeeded in entering the city, but they were not properly equipped for a siege of the main citadel. During their six-day-long reoccupation of Urfa, the Franks indiscriminately looted shops belonging to Christians and Muslims alike. The city's Muslims either fled to Harran or took shelter in the citadel with the Turkish garrison.

Meanwhile, Imad ad-Din's successor Nur ad-Din Zengi had arrived with an army of 10,000 soldiers and surrounded the city. When the Franks realized they were trapped, they attempted to retreat, but it ended in disaster and they were slaughtered as they tried to escape. Moreover, the city's population was massacred – the men were put to death, while the women and children were sold into slavery. The city's Christian community, one of the oldest in the world, had been destroyed and never recovered.

=== Zengid and Ayyubid rules ===
Although Nur ad-Din was an active builder elsewhere, only one building at Urfa can be attributed to him: the "rather plain" Great Mosque, which was probably on the site of an earlier church. After Nur ad-Din's death in 1174, Urfa was captured by his nephew Sayf al-Din Ghazi II.

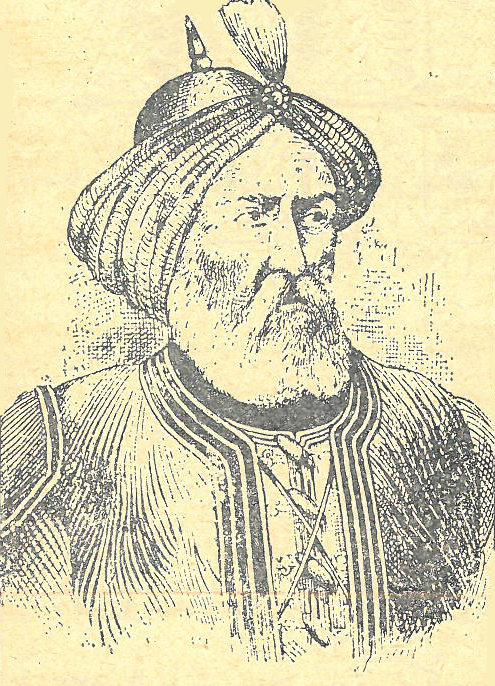
Saladin captured Urfa in 1182 after a siege, but the citadel continued to hold out and required a second siege.

Saladin captured Urfa in 1182 after a siege; he then separately besieged the citadel. He ended up paying the defenders off to let him take control of the citadel. He then appointed Muzaffar al-Din Gökböri as governor of Urfa along with Harran. During Saladin's reign, the cathedral of the Melkites was demolished. Part was used as building material for Urfa's citadel, and part was taken to Harran.

The Ayyubid empire essentially functioned as a dynastic "confederation of principalities united under one leading prince". During Saladin's reign, he established a principality based at Harran; Urfa was part of this principality. After Gökböri, the Harran-Urfa principality was also held by Saladin's brother al-Adil, who later ruled as the Ayyubid sultan himself.

During Ayyubid rule, a conservative estimate of Edessa's population is 24,000.

In June 1234, the city was taken by the Seljuk sultan Kayqubad I's army, and its inhabitants were deported to Anatolia. However, it was recaptured within four months by the Ayyubid ruler al-Kamil. Sometime shortly thereafter, the citadel was slighted on al-Kamil's orders.

=== Mongol rule ===
In 1260, Urfa voluntarily submitted to the troops of Hulagu and thus came under Mongol rule. Because the city had surrendered peacefully, its inhabitants were spared.

The Mongols never garrisoned Urfa; it was near their western border with the Mamluk Sultanate and was probably seen as "too difficult to defend". Its ruined fortress was "probably not thought worth repairing". The city was desolate at this point; its inhabitants had evacuated or abandoned it and "only Turcoman nomads lived in the otherwise empty city".

=== Mamluk and Aq Qoyunlu rules ===
The Mamluks gained control of Urfa sometime in the early 14th century. They renovated the ruined citadel probably during the third reign of an-Nasir Muhammad (1309–40), but the city "attracted few inhabitants". The Mamluk garrison only occupied the citadel itself; the surrounding city was still practically deserted and not worth committing any soldiers to defend. Located close to the Mamluks' eastern frontier, Urfa had "no commercial importance" because merchant traffic in Upper Mesopotamia was taking a route through Mardin and Ra's al-'Ayn rather than through Amid and Urfa.

That changed in the late 14th century, toward the end of the Mamluk period. Some commercial traffic had begun passing through Urfa enroute to Aleppo, and the city became at least partly repopulated. By around 1400, al-Qalqashandi wrote that Urfa had been rebuilt and was prosperous again. Meanwhile, in 1394, Timur occupied Urfa without much resistance; he "admired the buildings and took away some of the portable wealth".

The Aq Qoyunlu seized Urfa, a strategic military outpost on their western frontier, in the late 1410s or early 1420s. At some point, the Aq Qoyunlu ruler Kara Osman granted Urfa to his son Ali, whose quarrels with his brothers beginning in autumn 1428, prompted Kara Osman to replace him with Ali's brother Habil as governor of Urfa. Ali left Urfa in 1429 and headed north where he laid siege to Harpoot, which fell before Mamluk aid could come to the city's aid. This prompted the Mamluks to attack Urfa, an Aq Qoyunlu base that posed threat to Mamluk-held Aleppo. One day before the main Mamluk army arrived, a "local Arab contingent" reached Urfa and defeated Habil's Turkic forces. The Mamluk army arrived the next day and besieged the city. On 24 July, the citadel surrendered, and the Mamluks demolished the fortress and enslaved the women and children, killing many others. Contemporary historians compared the violent event to Timur's sack of Damascus in 1400.

About a decade later, Urfa was involved in the civil war between Ali Beg's son Jahangir and Jahangir's uncle Hamza for control of the Aq Qoyunlu. The contemporary historian Tihrani Isfahani wrote that Hamza's troops besieged Urfa but did not elaborate. Jahangir ended up making Urfa his main base at some point, from which he attacked Hamza in Erzincan and then later sent a raid against Ergani. Urfa was then the site of a battle in 1451, where Uzun Hasan successfully defeated other Aq Qoyunlu leaders shortly before gaining control of the tribal confederation as a whole. In 1462-3, under Uzun Hasan's reign, Urfa's citadel was renovated.

In early November 1480, a large Mamluk army under Yashbak min Mahdi, who was dawātdār-i kabīr or executive secretary to the Mamluk sultan Qaitbay, laid siege to Urfa. Yashbak bombarded the city walls with heavy cannon fire and used catapults to hurl fireballs into the city. This happened during the Islamic holy month of Ramadan, prompting Fazlallah Khunji Isfahani to liken Yashbak's actions to the tyrant Nimrod torturing the prophet Abraham with fire – also in Urfa, according to tradition. Aq Qoyunlu forces quickly arrived at Urfa from Diyar Bakr and, after a failed attempt at negotiations, a pitched battle took place. The Aq Qoyunlu army's right wing was commanded by Sulayman Beg Bijan and the left wing was commanded by Khalil Beg Mawsillu. The Mamluk forces were utterly defeated, and Yashbak was later executed. (Note: Contemporary sources give conflicting dates for when this battle took place. According to Ibn al-Himsi, it took place on 19 November; according to al-Sayrafi, 17 November; according to the anonymous Chronicle of Bar Hebraeus, 23 November.)

=== Ottoman period ===
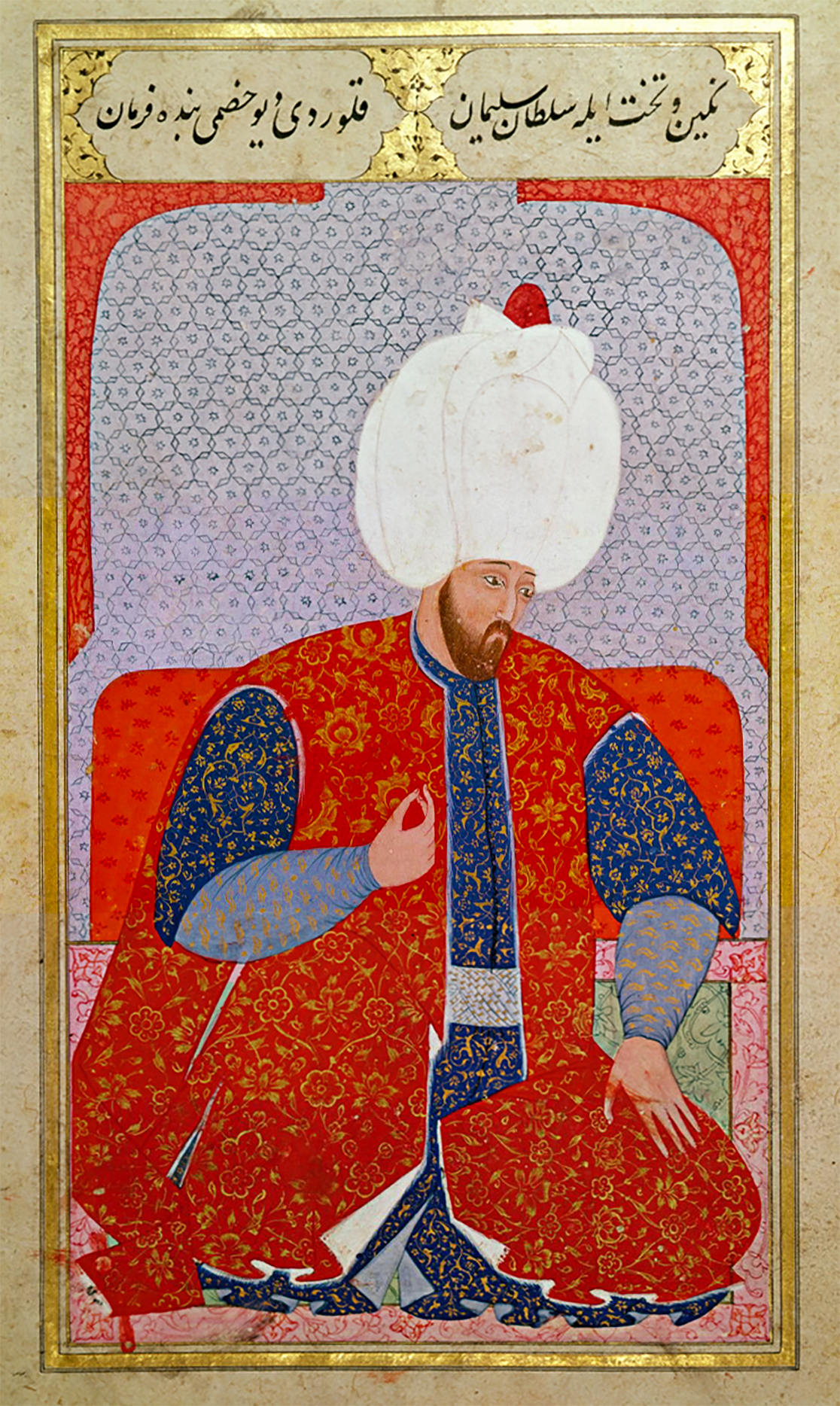
Suleiman the Magnificent's conquest of Baghdad in 1534 indirectly boosted commerce in Urfa by making regional trade routes safer to travel.

Urfa was likely initially incorporated into the Ottoman Empire during the rule of Selim I around 1517. The earliest surviving Ottoman tax register for Urfa, compiled in 1518, documented 1,082 families (700 Muslim and 382 Christian), suggesting a total population slightly exceeding 5,500 people. The relatively low population figure can be attributed to political turmoil in the region, particularly the ongoing conflict with Safavid Iran. By 1526, the city's population had increased to 1,322 families (988 Muslim and 334 Christian), indicating an estimated population of approximately 8,000.

Urfa experienced a renaissance under Ottoman rule. Industry and commerce picked back up, and its population rebounded, although it never reached the same population heights it had once held in the classical and early medieval periods. The high point lasted for about a century and a half, beginning with its conquest by the Ottomans. Urfa's population first became majority Turkish sometime during this period, sometime between 1520 and 1570. By 1566, a tax register shows the city with an estimated 13,000 to 14,000 people (1,704 Muslim families and 866 Christian families). At this point, the city was described as having five large mahalles, each named after one of the five city gates, and it "must have had an active textile industry". A bedestan is also recorded. Urfa's prosperity in the 1500s was based on both trade and agricultural production. Urfa was an important entrepot on trade routes between Iran and Aleppo.

Because of its prosperity, Urfa's population grew as it attracted residents from nearby cities. In 1586, Ottoman authorities created the Eyalet of Raqqa out of territories that had previously belonged to the Eyalet of Diyarbekir, and Urfa became "the center of economic and political power" in this new province. At the same time, the city's prosperity attracted bandits and nomadic tribes, although the urban population was largely unaffected. That changed at the end of the century, when the revolt of Karayazıcı Abdulhalim turned Urfa into a battlefield.

Relatively little is known about Karayazıcı, but he was presumably a tribesman who worked as a bureaucrat in the local administration (Yazıcı means "scribe"). His army was recruited from other local tribal members. In 1599–1600 (1008 AH), Karayazıcı's army laid siege to the outer and then inner citadel and thus gained control of Urfa. The contemporary historian Mustafa Selaniki blamed Urfa's fall on the governors of Aleppo and Damascus failing to send reinforcements in time. He set up a "quasi-state" based at Urfa's inner citadel, declaring himself sultan and Hüseyin Pasha (who had worked with him to capture the citadel) as grand vizier. Eventually, though, Ottoman troops (backed by reinforcements from Damascus and Aleppo) surrounded the inner citadel, dug trenches, and engaged the rebels in a bloody battle in the middle of the city. The rebels ran into ammunition shortages during the battle and had to melt down coins to use as bullets. Hüseyin Pasha was killed in the battle, but Karayazıcı himself managed to escape.

The instability accompanying the Celali revolts, and especially Karayazıcı's occupation of the city, must have sapped Urfa's prosperity. Several 17th-century accounts refer to parts of the town as being in disrepair. For example, when Jean-Baptiste Tavernier visited Urfa in 1644, "there were so many empty lots that [he] compared the town to a desert". The central Ottoman state's control of the surrounding Raqqa Eyalet weakened significantly in the early 1600s. Powerful ümera families from Urfa assumed responsibility for governance of the eyalet, while the actual office of governor was a sinecure for prominent Ottoman generals or their sons.

Urfa court records from about 1629 to 1631 (1039–40 AH) provide insight into local government during the Ottoman-Safavid War of 1623–1629. The Ottomans were in the process of mobilizing troops and resources in the area for the war effort, and the qadi of Urfa was responsible for billeting troops and gathering provisions. In August 1638, Sultan Murad IV stayed at Urfa along with his army while en route to Baghdad in the final campaign of the war. He ordered restoration work on the citadel, which is mentioned in written sources and confirmed by an inscription on the walls that still exists.

The most detailed account of early Ottoman Urfa was written by Evliya Çelebi, who visited the city in 1646. Part of his interest may have been because one of his relatives was a qadi here. His account mentions only three gates, with different names than those of the 1566 tax register. Evliya wrote that he counted 2,600 houses in the fortified part of the city, which probably indicates a population total similar to 1566. At this point, Urfa had houses generally made of mud brick; more opulent houses, belonging to paşas and qadis, had their own gardens and baths. Evliya also recorded 22 mosques, 3 medreses, and 3 zaviyes. He listed several hans, including the Yemiş Hânı, the Samsatkapısı, the Hacı İbrâhim Hânı, the Beykapısı Hânı, and the Sebîl Hânı. He also wrote that the city had 400 shops and several mills, including one named after one Tayyaroğlu Ahmed Paşa. However, he was apparently unimpressed by the city's shops and markets.

Evliya also wrote that Urfa had a tannery that produced high-quality yellow maroquin leather. Tavernier also noted the city's leather, saying that along with Tokat and Diyarbakır it produced some of the best maroquin leathers. Besides leather, Urfa was also renowned for its cotton fabrics during this period.

According to Onur Usta, part of why Urfa appeared to European visitors as "a derelict city with houses reduced to rubble" during this period was because it had a lot of residents from nomadic and tribal backgrounds. These people would have still engaged in nomadic transhumance activities during most parts of the year and "only needed a roof over their heads during the winter". The abandoned-looking houses would have belonged to them.

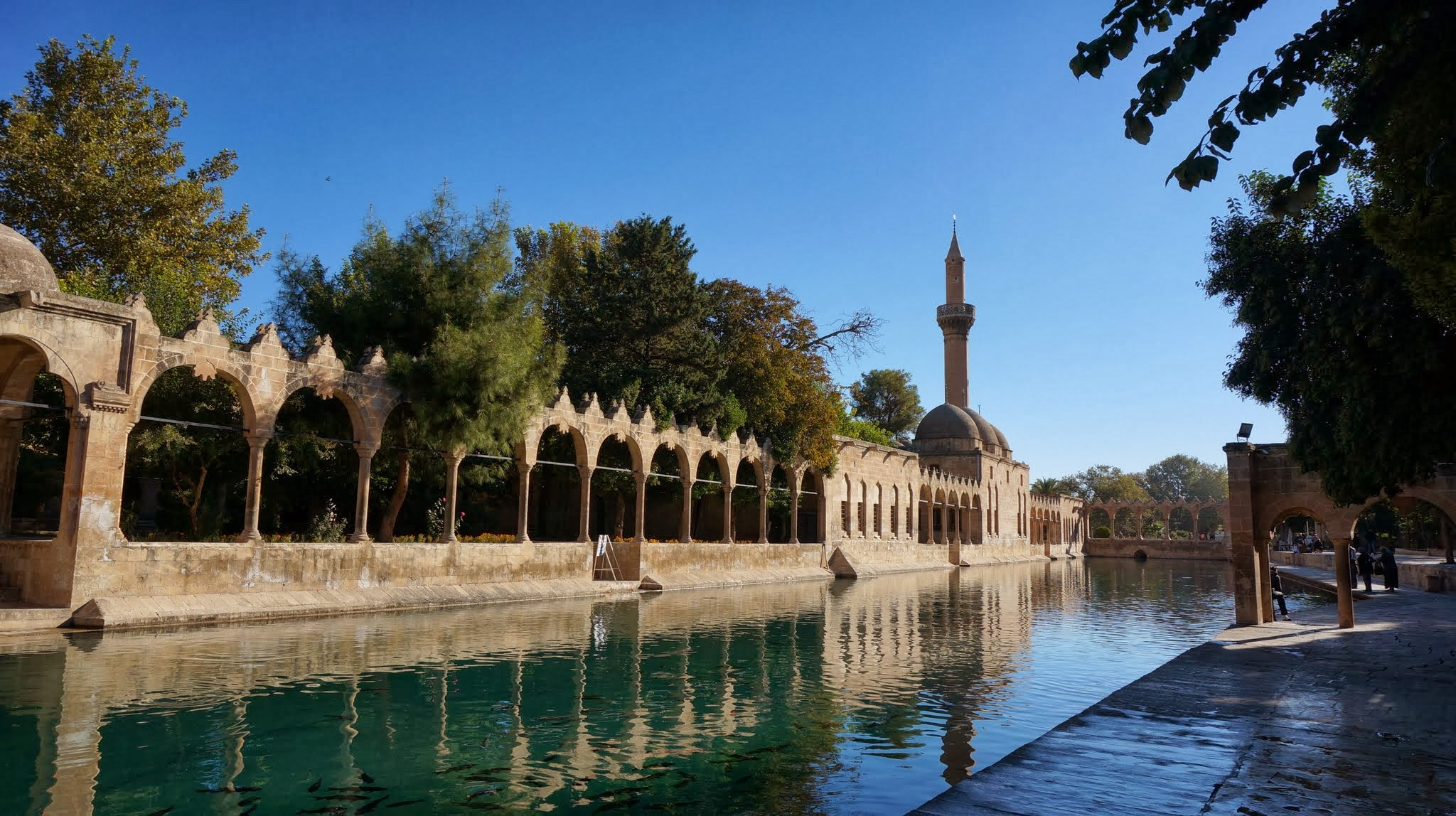
The Rızvaniye Mosque at Balıklıgöl, built in the early 1700s

Information about Urfa during the 1700s is relatively scarce, but one source is the fiscal records of the new Rızvaniye Mosque. These document the waqf properties assigned to the mosque, including shops, gardens, mills, and public baths, as well as information about tenants and rents. Based on various fiscal and tax documents, it seems that Urfa suffered a series of troubles in the 1750s and began to sink into poverty. One of the most serious problems was rampant banditry, which both impeded agricultural production in surrounding rural areas and hindered economic recovery.

A serious outbreak of plague hit Urfa in the 1780s, and many people died. Iraqi Turkmen, particularly from the regions around Mosul and Kirkuk, were deported and resettled in Urfa to help repopulate the city. The connection with Kirkuk in particular left cultural and linguistic traces in Urfa, and some present-day Urfalis have described the two cities as having an "uncle-nephew relationship".

==== 19th century ====
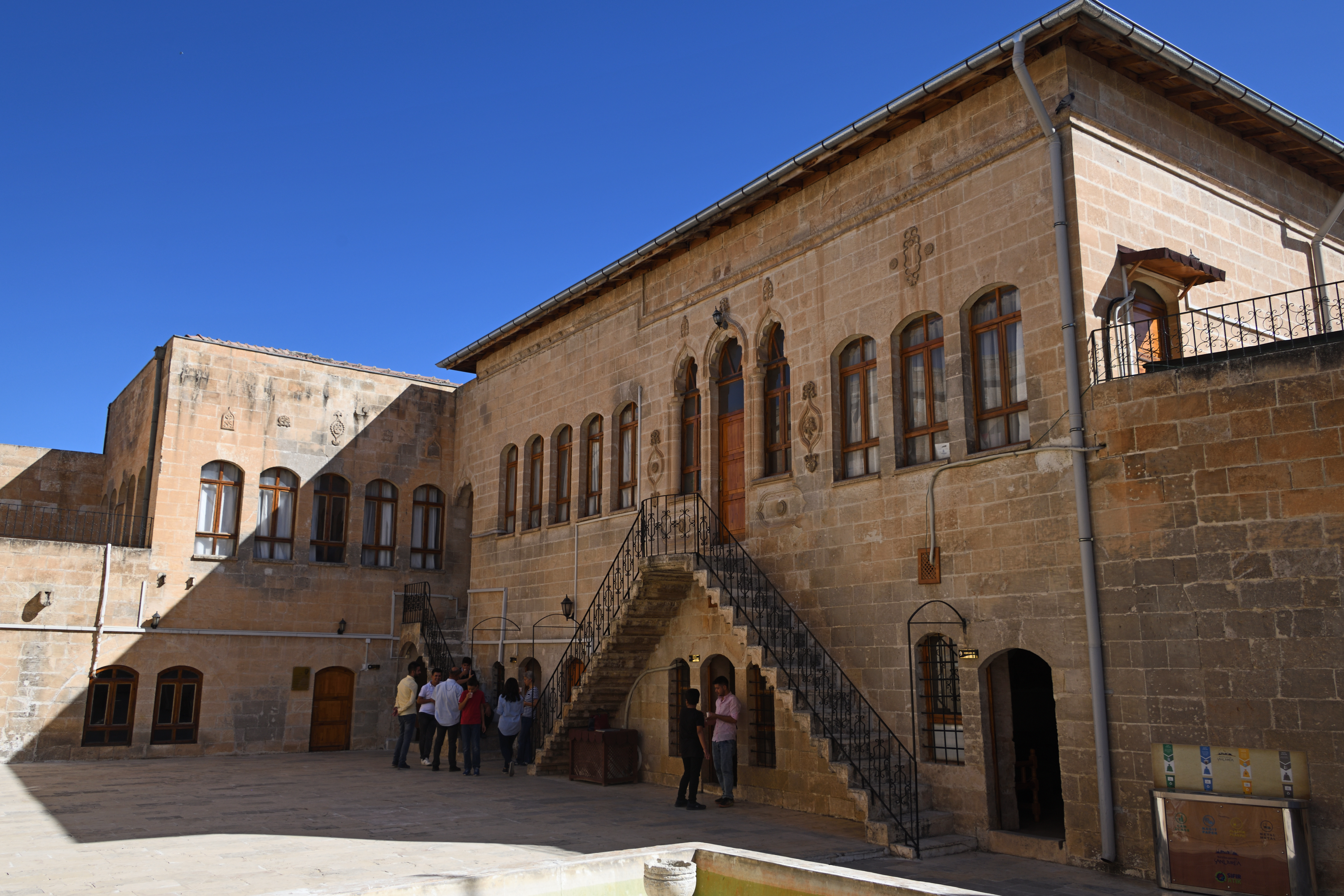
Urfa Reji Church, the structure was built on the remains of a church from the 6th century in 1861.

In the Ottoman period, Urfa was a center of commerce because of its location at a crossroads with Diyarbakır, Antep, Mardin, and Raqqa. Many Jewish, Armenian, and Greek merchants were present in Urfa, especially from Aleppo.

James Silk Buckingham visited Urfa in 1816 and ended up stuck there for a while because the roads were closed due to the ongoing Ottoman-Wahhabi War. Buckingham's account of early-1800s Urfa is one of the most informative of the late Ottoman period. By this time, the name "Urfa" had come to predominate, with only the city's Arab Christians still calling it "al-Ruha". The standard of living in Urfa had evidently increased since the 1600s – the mud brick houses recorded by Evliya Çelebi had given way to finer masonry structures that Buckingham compared to the houses of Aleppo. The houses described by Buckingham had harem and selamlik quarters separated by a courtyard, with the selamliks boasting "opulently furnished reception rooms" on their upper floors. Buckingham described the city as being divided into janissary and sharif factions, also like Aleppo. Many of the city's bazaars were closed due to the war, but Buckingham noted that Urfa had a thriving cotton trade during peacetime and observed some of the city's cotton printers at work. Coarser wool cloth and rugs were also manufactured in Urfa.

In the mid-1800s, Urfa benefitted from a general increase in commercial activity in the region. Most of the larger courtyard houses in the present-day old town probably date from this period. The large Armenian church on the western main street was built in 1842 and many mosques were probably also built around this time. According to Suraiya Faroqhi, though, the city's population "must have been at a low ebb for several decades in the mid-century".

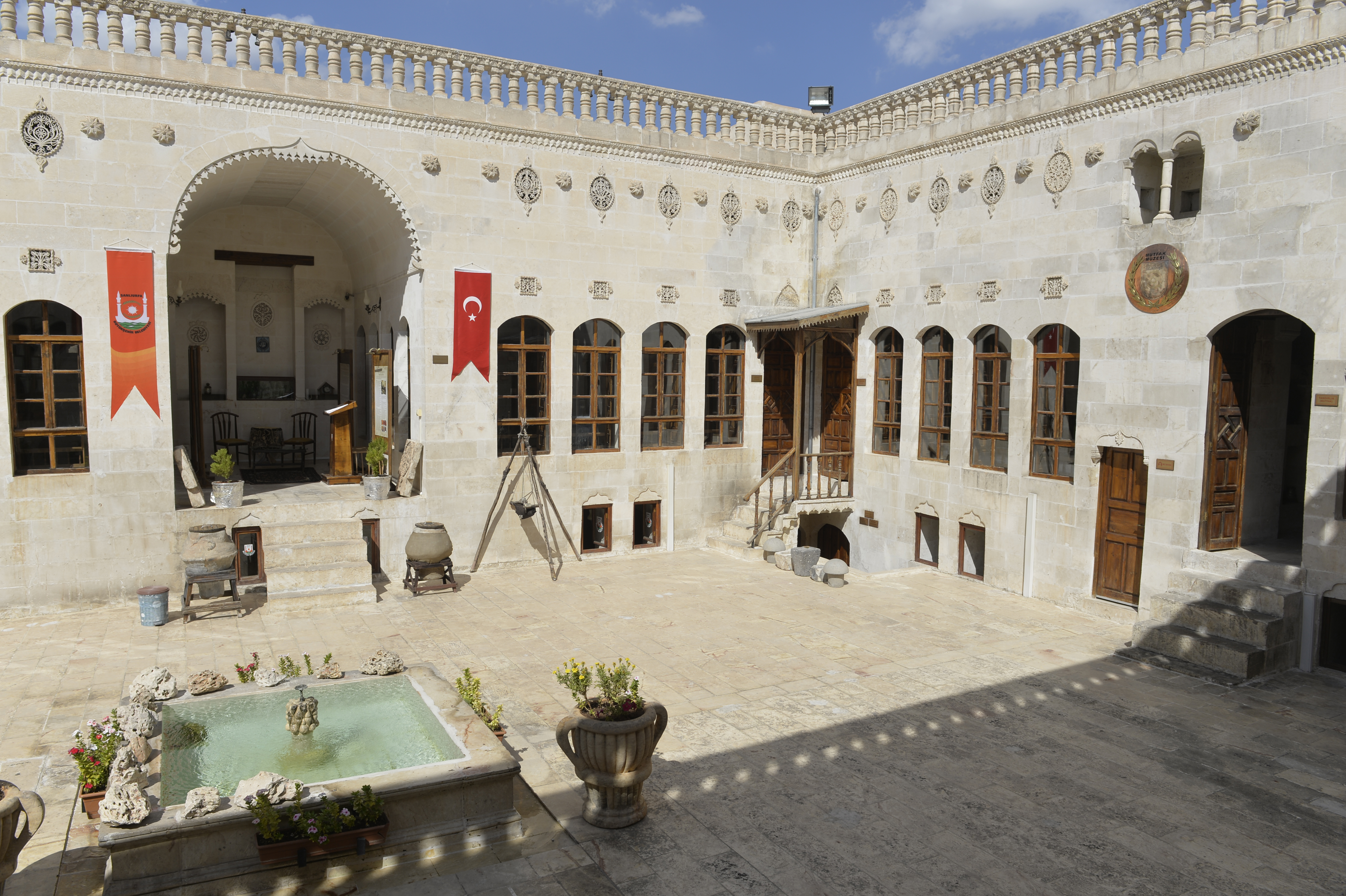
Urfa Kitchen Museum Building

However, in the late 1800s, Urfa declined in importance as a commercial center. In particular, the opening of the Suez Canal in 1869 caused a major realignment of trade routes, shifting away from overland caravans and towards maritime commerce. As a result, the volume of commercial traffic coming through Urfa decreased markedly compared to previous periods and became increasingly local/regional in nature. The local economy shifted away from producing goods for export and toward meeting the basic needs of the local population. Workshops produced less in general during this period and their focus was more on cheap basic goods like local fabrics and household goods. Imports also declined because the locals were focusing more on consuming cheap basic goods rather than luxuries; they were living simpler, more frugal lives. Because people were using more local products, the cost of living also decreased and people had to work less to meet their expenses. Contemporary court records document that there was extensive commercial contact between Muslims and non-Muslims; they bought and sold goods freely between each other and entered into commercial partnerships together, indicating that there was relatively high trust between both groups.

The main centers of commercial activity in the Ottoman period were the bazaars, where both local and imported goods were bought and sold. Generally, a bazaar would be named after its primary function and main goods sold there. For example, the İsotçular Çarşısı was named because of the homemade chili peppers sold in this street. Among the bazaars mentioned in late 19th-century records: Kadıoğlu, Köroğlu, Eski Arasa, Teymurcu, Sarayönü, Belediye, Beykapı, Akar, Sipâhî, Bedestan, Hânönü, Kafavhâne, and Hüseyniye.

There was a huge increase in the number of hans recorded in the Aleppo Salnames in the late 1800s: from just 7 in 1867 to 11 in 1888, 18 in 1889, and 32 in 1898. According to Yasin Taş, this is because not only were new hans being built, but records were simply counting more types of commercial buildings as hans. Muslim and non-Muslim travelers would both use the same hans regardless of religion.

In the countryside surrounding Urfa, life went on largely unchanged. Most rural villagers were involved in agriculture, and farmlands were typically plowed using the same low-tech methods that had been used for thousands of years. Cows and oxen were kept as draft animals. Irrigated farmland around the Euphrates and some streams was more expensive than the waterless fields called "deştî land" which was not able to be irrigated. Irrigation channels were repaired jointly among the people who used the water. Sometimes there would be people living in the city (often non-Muslim) who would own farmland outside the city and deputize local villagers (often Muslim) to run the farm under the muzâraa contract. In 1846, taxes could not be collected because of drought and locusts. In 1861, 1863, and 1886, there were locusts; in 1870 there was a drought due to lack of rain.

Up until the mid-1890s, about 20,000 of the city's 60,000 residents were Armenians. In 1895, however, thousands of Armenians were killed in a series of massacres by both civilians and soldiers. First, in October, Turkish and Kurdish locals killed hundreds of Armenians over a two-day period. Then for two months the Armenian quarter was effectively subjected to a siege, with no food or water allowed in. The Turks claimed that the Armenians had a weapon cache, which they demanded in return for lifting the siege. In December, the siege ended when "a crowd of Turkish soldiers and civilians" entered the Armenian quarter and killed thousands of its inhabitants. About 3,000 survivors sought shelter in a nearby church – which is normally recognized as a place of refuge under Islamic law. However, soldiers burned the church to the ground, killing everyone inside. The troops went on to loot and burn the rest of the Armenian quarter. According to Lord Kinross, some 8,000 Armenians were killed in total.

There was a small but ancient Jewish community in Urfa, with a population of about 1,000 by the 19th century. Most of the Jews emigrated in 1896, fleeing the Hamidian massacres, and settling mainly in Aleppo, Tiberias and Jerusalem. There were three Christian communities: Syriac, Armenian, and Latin. The last Neo-Aramaic Christians left in 1924 and went to Aleppo (where they settled in a place that was later called Hay al-Suryan "The Syriac Quarter").

=== World War I and after ===
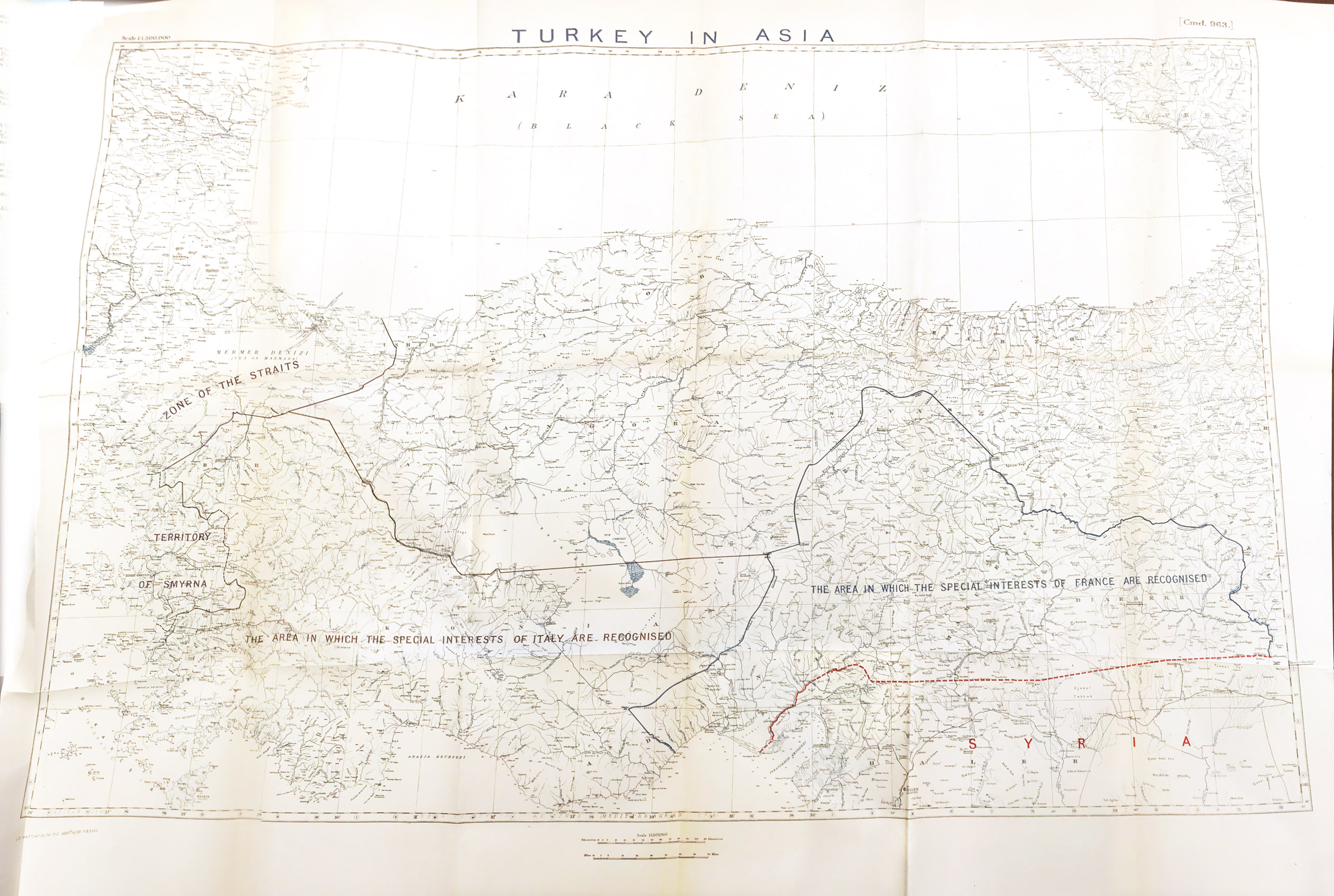
Map showing the borders set by the Treaty of Sevres, which assigned Urfa to the French-controlled Mandate of Syria. Urfa is shown here just below the dotted red line, and directly above the "Y" in "Syria".

During World War I, Urfa was a site of the Armenian and Assyrian genocides, beginning in 1915. Members of Urfa's Armenian community were deported and killed. In May, 18 families were deported from Urfa, and in June, 50 people were arrested, tortured, and then deported to Diyarbakır, where they were killed on the road. Urfa was also a stop on the deportation route, and the Urfa resistance in October was composed of Armenians deported from Van and Diyarbakır. Survivors from killings elsewhere had begun to arrive in Urfa, and by mid-August, massacres had begun in Urfa itself. Some 400 Armenians were taken to the edge of town and killed during a four-day period from 15–19 August. (Note: Armenian-Genocide.org presents a somewhat different timeline: according to them, the first killings happened on 19 August, when about 250 Armenians were killed, and the second round happened four days later on 23 August.) Another massacre took place on 23 September, when 300 Armenians were killed.

In response to the Urfa resistance in October, Mehmet Celal Bey, who had served as governor of Aleppo before being sacked for refusing to comply with the order to deport the local Armenians, commented: "Each human has the right to live. A trampled worm will squirm and wriggle. The Armenians will defend themselves." The final event of the resistance was on 15 October, when several thousand Turkish troops attacked their position. The next day, some 20,000 Armenian deportees in transit were killed in and around Urfa.

Meanwhile, during the Russian occupation of Western Armenia, many Turks fleeing those regions came and settled in Urfa. Mehmet Adil Saraç estimates that around 8,000 to 10,000 Turks migrated to the Urfa region this way.

At the end of World War I, the Treaty of Sèvres assigned Urfa to the French-controlled Mandate of Syria, 5 km south of the border with Turkey. As a result, Urfa was occupied by British and then French troops. Locals from Urfa formed a militia and successfully drove out the occupying troops on 11 April 1920. The 1923 Treaty of Lausanne officially settled the matter by including Urfa as part of the new Republic of Turkey. Under the new republic, Urfa was made capital of the new Urfa Province on 20 April 1924.

=== 21st century ===
During the Syrian Civil War, thousands of Syrian refugees fled to Turkey, and many of them settled in Urfa. When Raqqa became the capital of the Islamic State, Urfa became a gateway for jihadists entering Syria because of its closeness to the Akçakale-Tall Abyad border crossing and to Raqqa itself. The city's general religious-conservative climate meant that many locals who adhere to Salafi thought sympathized with the Islamic State, and many of its members lived in the city as well.

On 6 February 2023, Urfa suffered some damage from the twin Turkey-Syria earthquakes.

== Geography ==
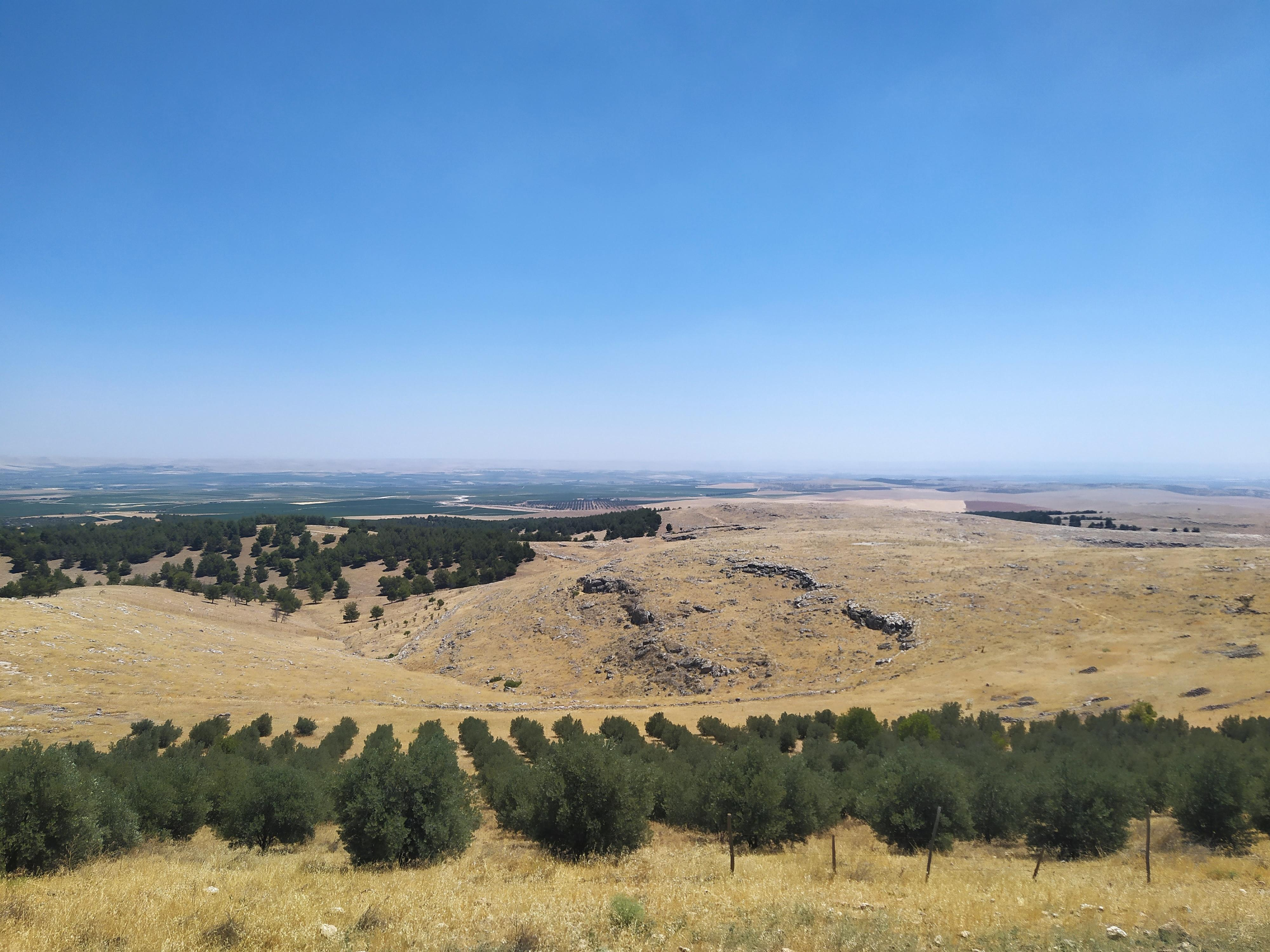
The Urfa countryside, as seen from Göbekli Tepe

Urfa is located at the border between the foothills of the Taurus Mountains and the great Mesopotamian plain. In general, these two regions meet "well to the south" of Urfa, but around Harran the plain extends northward, cutting into the hills. At the northwestern corner of the Harran plain, there is another extension in the plain, this time going westward. Urfa is located in this second extension of the plains, tucked behind the hills at its southern edge.

A small stream flows through Urfa. This stream is known as the Daisan, or "leaping river", after its tendency for flooding. Today, the Daisan flows through a man-made channel that follows the north and east sides of the old walled city. Before the channel was made, though, the stream's natural course was on the west side of the old city, then it turned east. Part of the former course survives as the fish pool called Birket Ibrahim, which tradition associates with the patriarch Abraham. To the south of the stream's old course is a spring in a cave that is now converted into a mosque.

Since the 20th century, Urfa has expanded northward, across the little plain and the hill known as Şehitlik Mahallesi with blocks of flats, as well as over the escarpment to the south.

=== Climate ===
Urfa has a hot-summer Mediterranean climate (Köppen: Csa, Trewartha: Cs). During the summer months, average high temperatures often exceed 40 °C (104 °F) and it has one of the hottest summers in the world among places that are not in arid or semi-arid regions, while rainfall is almost non-existent. Winters are cool and relatively wet, frost is common along with very sporadic snowfall. Spring and autumn are warm and moderately dry.

Highest recorded temperature: 46.8 °C (116.2 °F) on 30 July 2000
Lowest recorded temperature: −12.4 °C (9.7 °F) on 9 February 1932

Climate data for Urfa (1991–2020, extremes 1929–2023)
Month	Jan	Feb	Mar	Apr	May	Jun	Jul	Aug	Sep	Oct	Nov	Dec	Year
Record high °C (°F)	21.6 (70.9)	25.5 (77.9)	29.5 (85.1)	36.4 (97.5)	40.4 (104.7)	44.1 (111.4)	46.8 (116.2)	46.2 (115.2)	43.9 (111.0)	37.8 (100.0)	30.8 (87.4)	26.0 (78.8)	46.8 (116.2)
Mean daily maximum °C (°F)	10.6 (51.1)	12.5 (54.5)	17.5 (63.5)	23.1 (73.6)	29.6 (85.3)	35.7 (96.3)	39.5 (103.1)	39.0 (102.2)	34.5 (94.1)	27.7 (81.9)	18.9 (66.0)	12.4 (54.3)	25.1 (77.2)
Daily mean °C (°F)	6.2 (43.2)	7.5 (45.5)	11.8 (53.2)	16.8 (62.2)	22.8 (73.0)	28.8 (83.8)	32.6 (90.7)	32.0 (89.6)	27.4 (81.3)	21.2 (70.2)	13.1 (55.6)	7.9 (46.2)	19.0 (66.2)
Mean daily minimum °C (°F)	3.0 (37.4)	3.6 (38.5)	7.0 (44.6)	11.3 (52.3)	16.6 (61.9)	21.9 (71.4)	25.4 (77.7)	25.0 (77.0)	20.8 (69.4)	15.8 (60.4)	8.9 (48.0)	4.8 (40.6)	13.7 (56.7)
Record low °C (°F)	−10.6 (12.9)	−12.4 (9.7)	−7.3 (18.9)	−3.2 (26.2)	2.5 (36.5)	8.3 (46.9)	15.0 (59.0)	16.0 (60.8)	10.0 (50.0)	1.9 (35.4)	−6.0 (21.2)	−6.4 (20.5)	−12.4 (9.7)
Average precipitation mm (inches)	81.0 (3.19)	66.3 (2.61)	57.9 (2.28)	44.7 (1.76)	26.2 (1.03)	5.8 (0.23)	2.0 (0.08)	4.0 (0.16)	8.1 (0.32)	24.6 (0.97)	51.2 (2.02)	78.7 (3.10)	450.5 (17.74)
Average rainy days	11.57	10.67	9.77	9.53	7.33	1.57	0.4	0.3	1.2	5.47	7.17	10.77	75.8
Average snowy days	1.9	1.4	0.6	0	0	0	0	0	0	0	0.1	0.7	4.7
Average relative humidity (%)	70.6	66.5	59.6	55.5	45.8	34.6	32.0	36.5	39.3	47.3	59.6	70.2	51.4
Mean monthly sunshine hours	117.8	135.6	189.1	225.0	288.3	345.0	359.6	325.5	273.0	220.1	159.0	108.5	2,746.5
Mean daily sunshine hours	3.8	4.8	6.1	7.5	9.3	11.5	11.6	10.5	9.1	7.1	5.3	3.5	7.5
Source 1: Devlet Meteoroloji İşleri Genel Müdürlüğü
Source 2: NOAA (humidity, 1991–2020), Meteomanz(snow days 2000–2023)

== Main sights ==
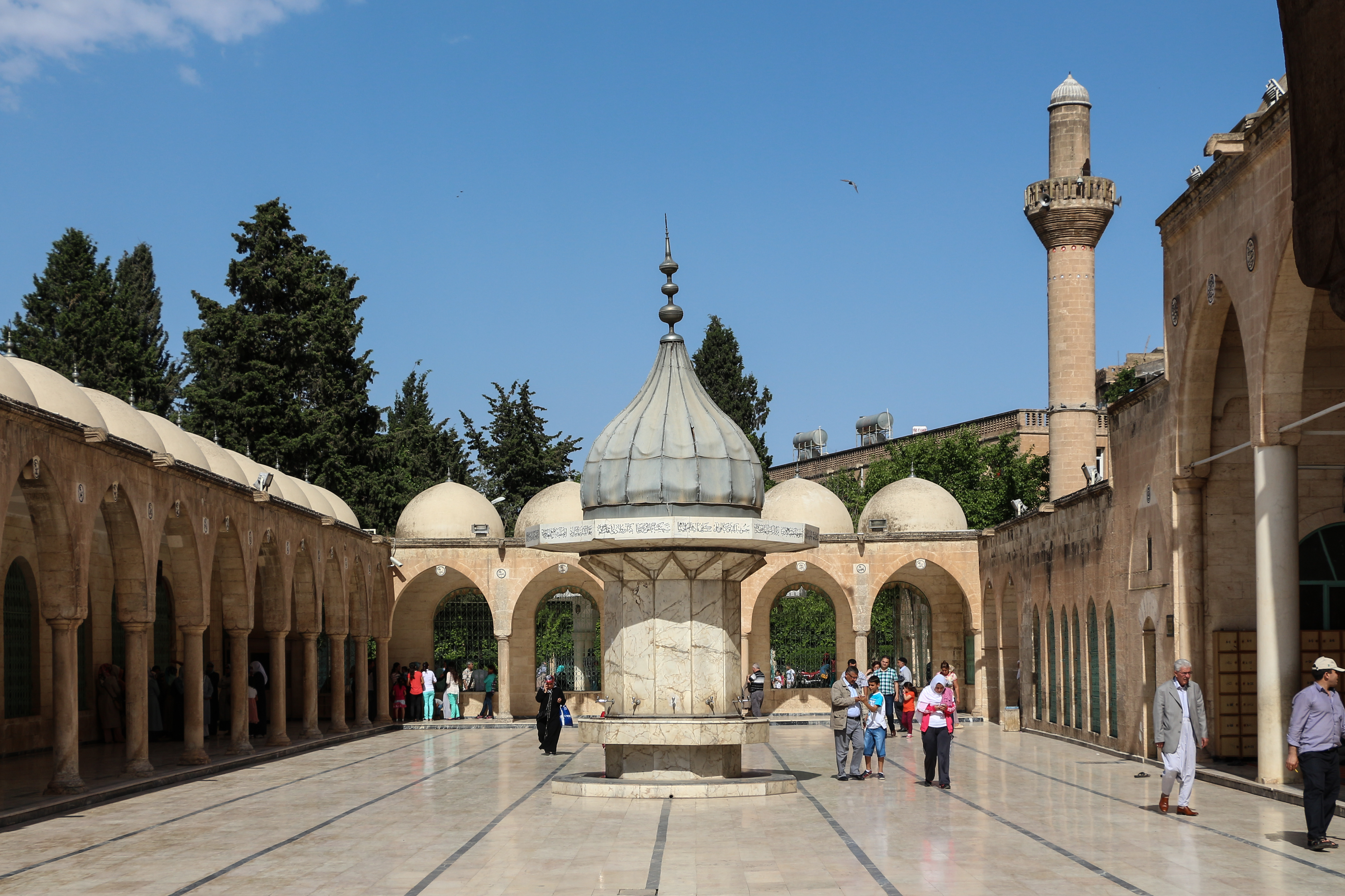
Main courtyard of the Mevlid-i Halil Mosque

=== The citadel ===
Urfa castle is located on the rocky heights south of the historical city center. It is long and thin because it crowns a ridge.

The hilltop was the site of an Abgarid winter palace built in the 3rd century; the two columns are the only remnant of this palace. The first known fortification of the site dates from the early 6th century, under the emperor Justinian. Fortifications may have existed here previously, but if they did then they went unrecorded.

The fortress was generally well-maintained during the middle ages, and it withstood a number of attacks. It was destroyed on the orders of the Ayyubid sultan al-Kamil around 1235. In the early 1300s, it was rebuilt under the Mamluk sultan an-Nasir Muhammad. It was further renovated under the Aq Qoyunlu in the 1400s, and then again under the Ottomans at various points: under Suleiman the Magnificent in the 1500s and then under Murad IV in the early 1600s.

Urfa's castle was garrisoned with janissaries until their dissolution in 1826. It was already in serious disrepair by that point, though; only the part where the janissaries were posted was maintained at all. Afterwards, the citadel was essentially abandoned. In 1849, a local citizen named Sakıp Efendi dismantled part of the citadel and used the stones to build an inn and market; he also allegedly took a lot of stones to sell for money.

=== Old city walls ===
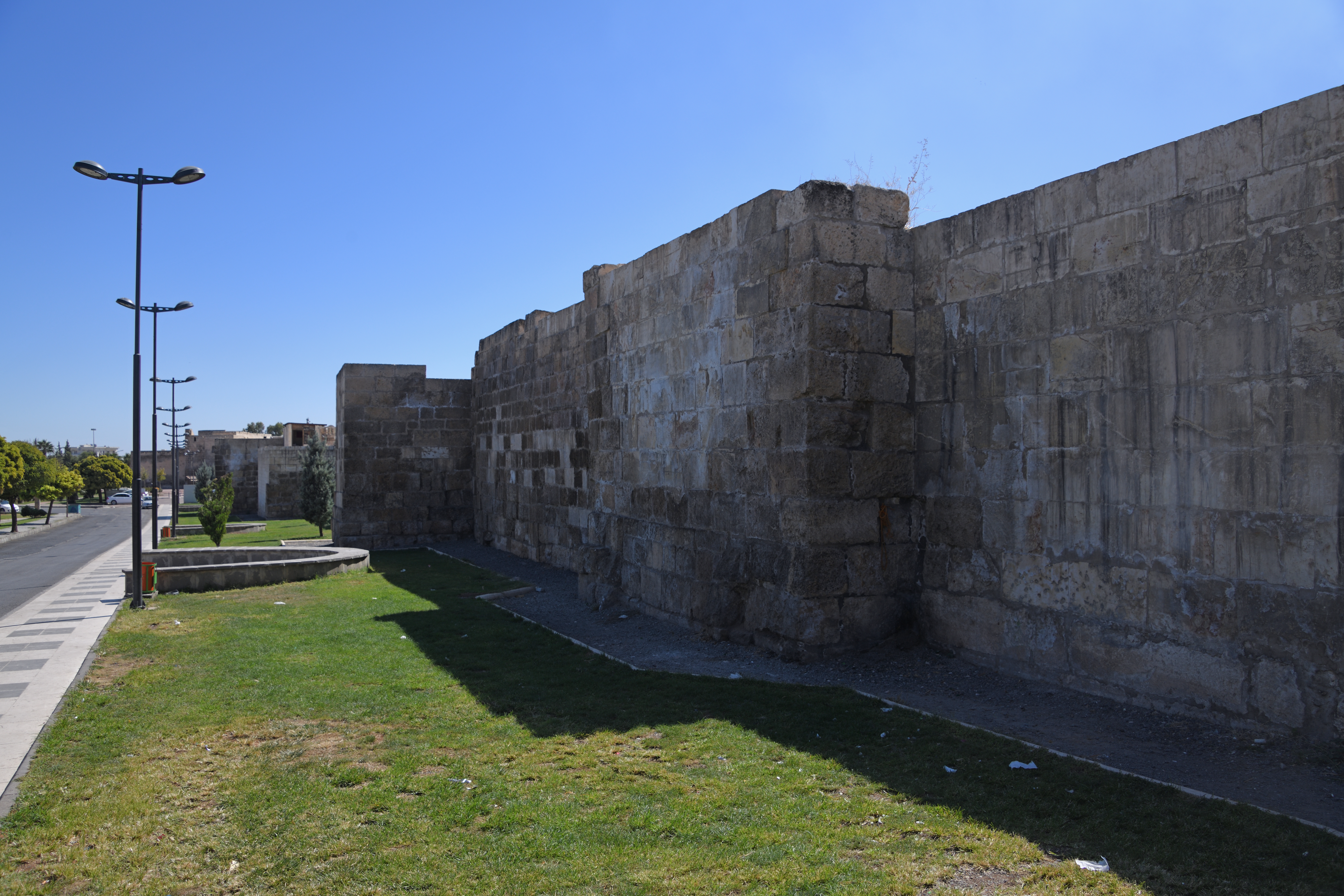
Some stretches of the old city walls remain standing

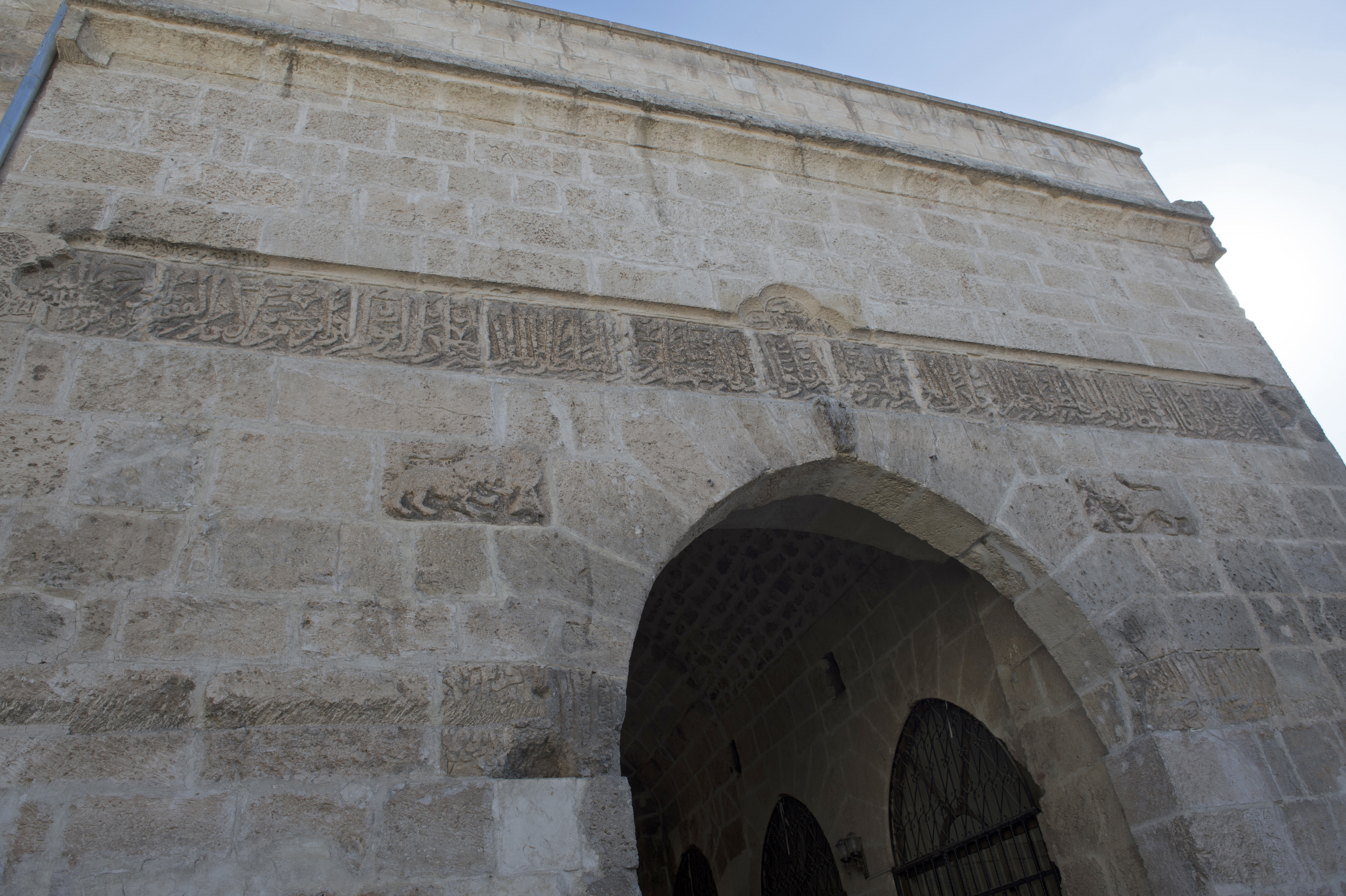
Inner face of the Harran Gate

The monumental walls surrounding the old town date from the Abbasid-era rebuilding in 812. The only major repairs to them took place during the early Ottoman period, in 1660–61, when there was restoration work done on the city's fortifications in general. The walls are made of large stone blocks over 30 cm tall all the way through (i.e. not just on the faces). The early Ottoman repairs are distinguished by their small size, white color, and light bossing. In many places, people have built private houses directly adjoining the city wall's inner face, so that it forms one side of the house. Because of Urfa's location, the east wall was always the most exposed to attack; large chunks of the surviving sections here consist of Ottoman repairs.

There were three known gates in the city walls: the Harran Gate; the Bey Kapısı, or "Lord's Gate"; and the Saray Kapısı, or "Palace Gate". The Harran Gate, located near the southeast corner of the walled city, still exists; its outer face (outside the walls) was rebuilt at some point, possibly during the Ottoman renovations of 1660–61. Its inner face, however, dates back to the Ayyubid period, under the local ruler Muzaffar Ghazi Shihab ad-Din (1230–45). The inscription recording his name runs almost from one end of the gatehouse to the other; below it, and above the top of the arch, is a small relief of a double-headed eagle.

The monumental Bey Kapısı, located on the east side of the old city, also still exists, although the actual gate no longer does. The original gatehouse was built in ancient times, perhaps during the 4th or 6th century. It probably had two large U-shaped towers with two or three gates in between them. Those two towers still exist today, although they were completely rebuilt over the centuries so that none of the original structures remain. The south tower kept its shape, but the north tower is now shaped like a polygon with straight sides. The entire gatehouse was turned into a fortress in the early middle ages. This may have happened during the Abbasid rebuilding of the city walls in 812, but in any case it had already happened by the early 11th century when sources refer to two castles in the city. The fortress consisted of a rectangular enclosure with the two towers on its east side; the north tower was probably rebuilt at this point. The fortress's entire eastern wall appears to have been moved back by about 12 m and the old gates were closed up in the process. The new gate was built at the northwest corner of the fortress, between it and the main city wall, so that there was a passage between them. At some point, this passage was blocked up. The Armenian prince Toros appears to have begun a rebuilding of the Bey Kapısı fortress, as attested by an Armenian inscription on the south tower, but this project was only finished under the crusaders. Later, during the Ottoman renovations of 1660–61, the fortress was rebuilt again. In the mid-1800s, the entire fortress was converted into a private residence, and rebuilding from this period has replaced most of the earlier masonry in many places.

As for the Saray Kapısı, it no longer exists, but it was originally located behind the bridge that takes Atatürk Caddesi over the river on the north side of town.

=== Balıklıgöl ===
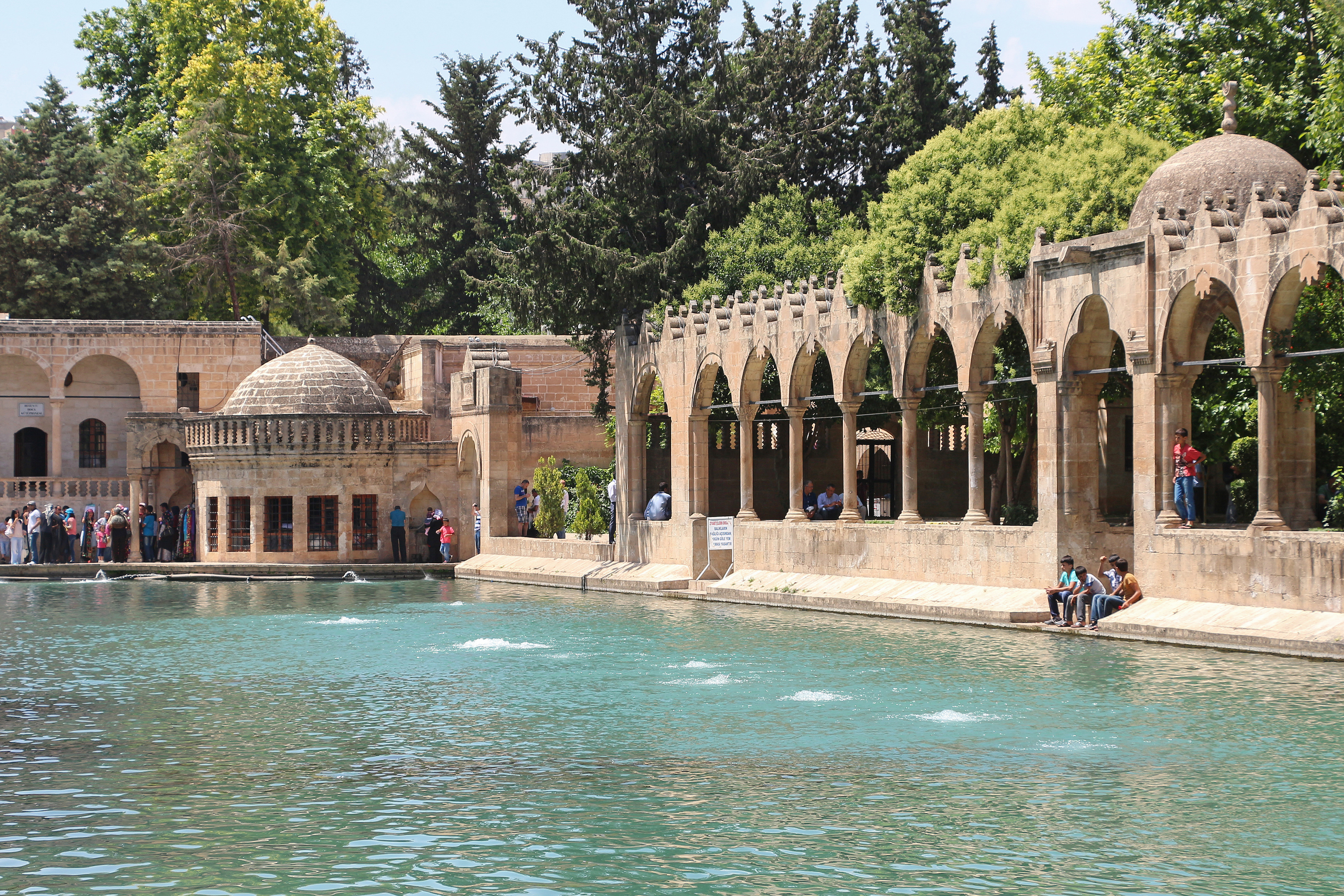
Abraham's Pool in Urfa

According to legend, Balıklıgöl was formed by the prophet Abraham's confrontation with the tyrant Nimrod, who supposedly ruled over Urfa from the citadel above. When Abraham came of age, he destroyed Nimrod's idols, and in retaliation Nimrod "made a catapult out of the castle's twin pillars" and hurled Abraham into a pit of fire below. When Abraham landed, the flames miraculously turned into water, and the wood used to stoke the fire was turned into carp.

==== Halil ür-Rahman Cami ====
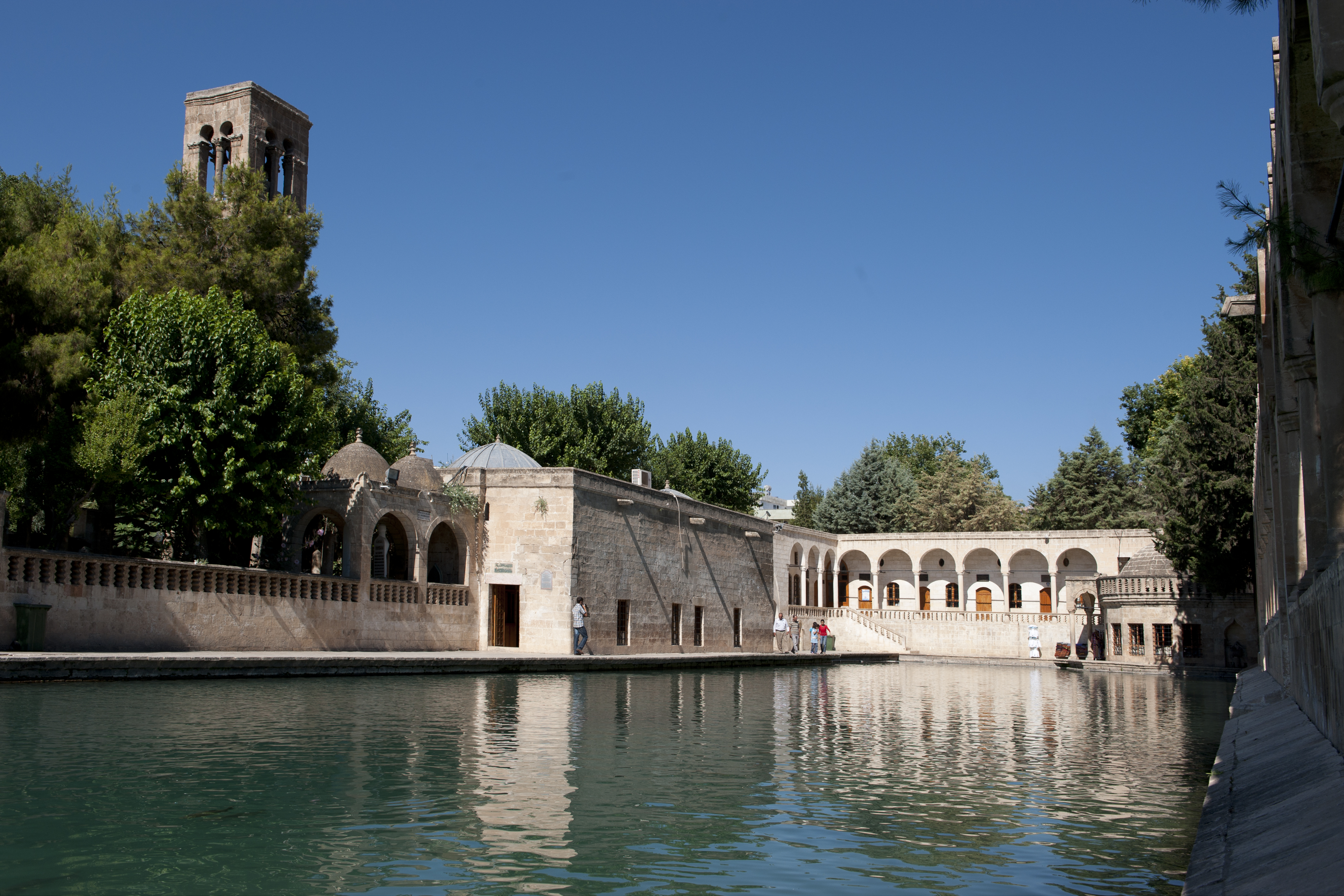
The Halil ür-Rahman Cami

The Halil ür-Rahman Cami, also called simply the Halil Cami, is a mosque and medrese located on the south side of the pool. Just south of the mosque is a cave which according to legend is where the prophet Abraham was born. Another tradition says that Abraham intended to sacrifice his son Isaac here, but sacrificed a goat instead; when he did, a spring gushed out, feeding the fish pool.

The earliest part of the complex is the minaret, which was built in 1211–12 under Ayyubid rule. There was presumably a mosque with a prayer hall on the site of the present one, which was completely rebuilt in 1819–20 (but probably similar to the original one). The other major component is a series of medrese "cells", fronted by a portico, which were built in 1808–09 and then renovated in 1871–72. The original Ayyubid complex may have been built to serve as a medrese, but by Ottoman times it was being used as a tekke with kitchens, reception rooms, and guest rooms, which may have been on the same site as the medrese cells. The tekke complex was converted into a medrese in the 1800s, possibly as soon as the medrese cells were built.

The mosque itself now serves as an antechamber where prayers can be said before entering the cave through a door on the south side. The mosque is entered through a domed vestibule on the west side. The prayer hall is a small squarish room with three aisles; two of them have groin-vaulted ceilings, while the middle one is topped with a dome. The mihrab is surrounded by an arch with squinches that seem to imitate Artukid style.

The minaret is a square tower that is visually divided into thirds by three molded cornices, one of which is at the very top. The upper level has pairs of mullioned windows on all four sides. The tops of the windows form horseshoe-shaped arches.

The medrese cells, now used as a Qur'an school, are elevated from the surrounding pavement. The cells are fronted by a portico with simple rounded arches. A balustrade with zigzag posts runs along the front of the portico. At the northwest corner of the pool is a five-sided room that projects out into the water on three sides. A restoration in the late 20th century extended the balustrade onto the top of the five-sided room.

==== Ayn Zeliha ====
The pool of Ayn Zeliha, named after Nimrod's daughter, is located south of the main pool. It is shaded by trees and surrounded by cafés.

=== Haleplibahçe museum complex ===
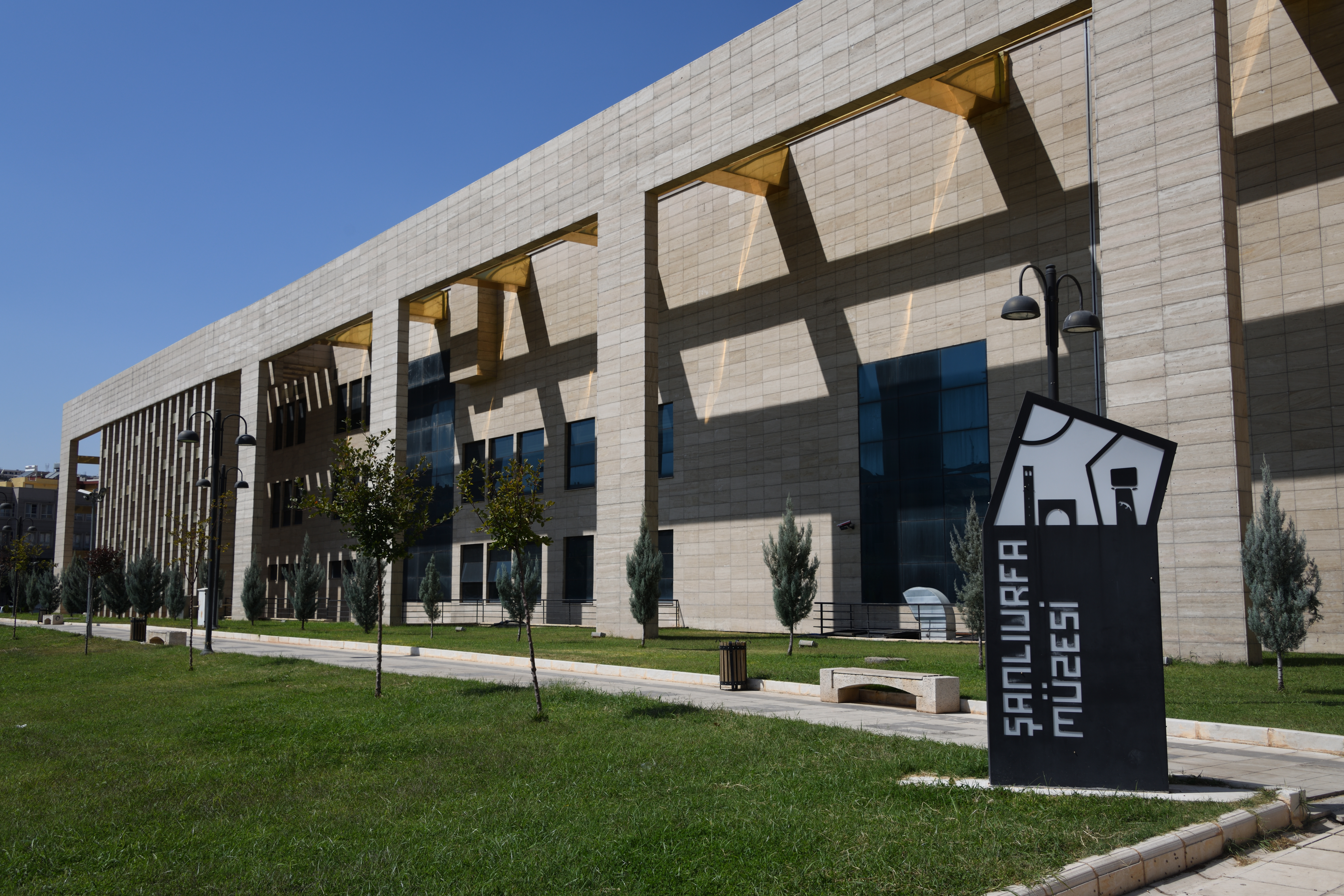
Exterior of the Şanlıurfa Museum

The Haleplibahçe museum complex (Turkish: Haleplibahçe Müze Kompleksi) is located near Balıklıgöl and occupies a 40-hectare area. It consists of two museums: the Şanlıurfa Museum and the Haleplibahçe Mosaic Museum. The Şanlıurfa Museum was originally founded in 1965 and moved to its present location in 2015. With over 34,000 square meters of indoor space, it is the largest museum in Turkey. It has 14 exhibition halls and 33 animation areas and houses some 10,000 artefacts from the Paleolithic through Islamic times. This includes finds from Göbekli Tepe, Harran, and the areas now inundated by the Atatürk Dam. As for the Haleplibahçe Mosaic Museum, it was built in situ on the top of where the Haleplibahçe mosaics were originally found. Among the mosaics on display here is the oldest known mosaic to depict the Amazons.

=== Kızılkoyun necropolis ===
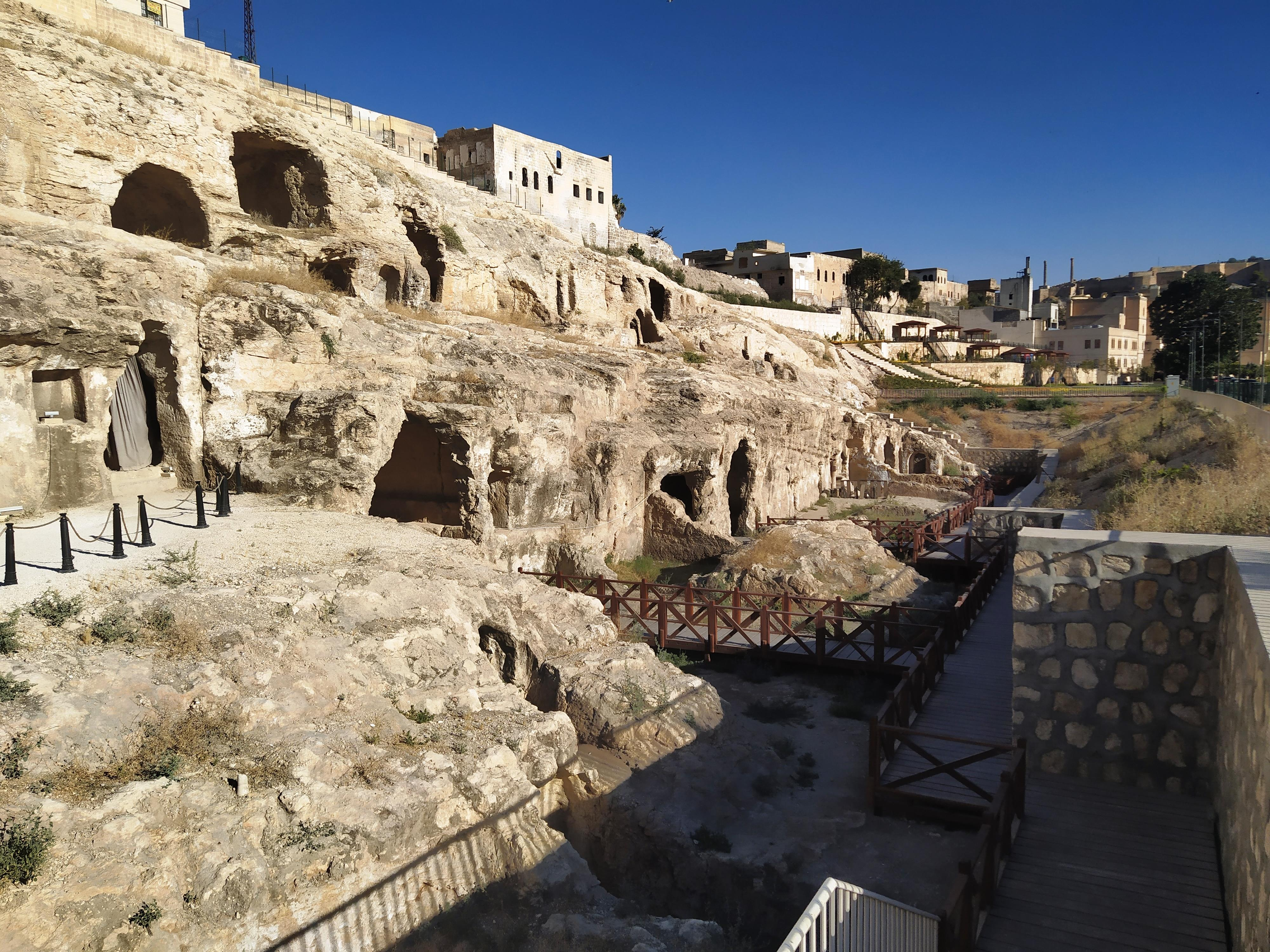
Part of the Kızılkoyun necropolis

Just to the east of the Haleplibahçe museum complex is the Kızıllkoyun necropolis, where at least 75 rock-cut cave tombs were carved into a limestone ridge during the Roman period, in the 3rd and 4th centuries. The tombs vary in size and design based on the socioeconomic status of their occupants, ranging from one to three rooms and some having special front entrances. Some of the tombs were also decorated with statues and mosaics.

In the 1970s, the Kızılkoyun area became occupied by informal squatter housing, which was later legitimized through construction amnesty in the 1980s. Nearby sites were designated as protected monuments, but the Kızılkoyun necropolis was not designated as anything until 2008 when it was declared as a second-degree archaeological site. In 2012, the necropolis was officially registered as the Yenimahalle Urban Archaeological Site, and 387 houses and workplaces on the premises were demolished. A new landscaping project was commenced in 2015.

=== Grand Mosque ===
The 12th-century Grand Mosque of Urfa is a congregational mosque.

=== Kapalı Çarşı ===
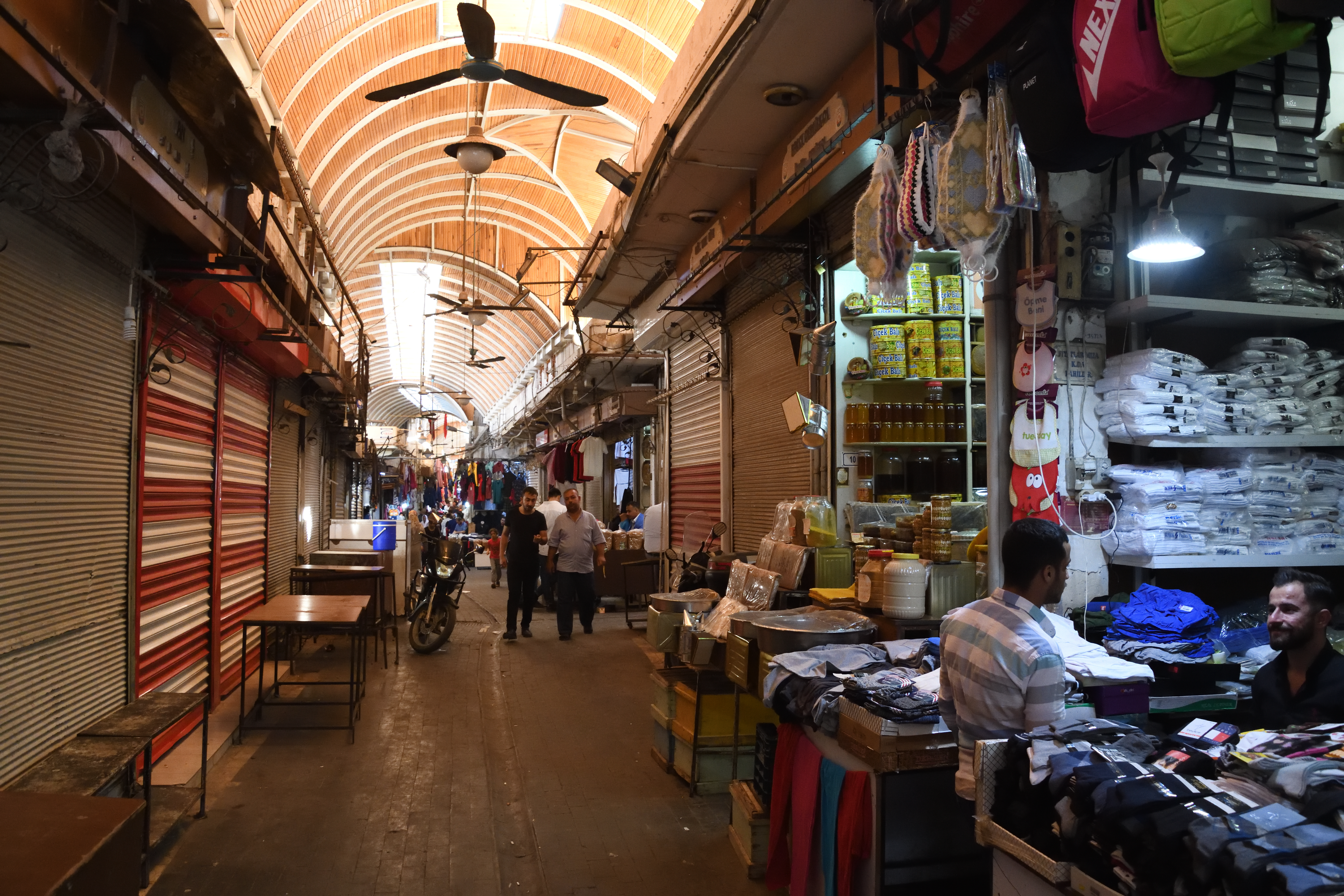
Covered marketplace in Urfa

The Kapalı Çarşı is a "maze-like" covered bazaar area at the south end of Divan Caddesi, not far from Balıklıgöl. Its narrow streets are lined with shops and stalls selling a wide variety of goods: herbs and spices, many different types of fabric, "green Diyarbakır tobacco by the kilo", even guns. Household appliances are sometimes auctioned off here as well. The bazaar is covered area because of the climate: during the summer, the covers allow people to stay cool in the shade, while in winter they offer a bit of warmth.

The Kapalı Çarşı is one of the busiest shopping areas in the city; it serves locals and tourists as well as people coming from the surrounding villages to buy things in the city. It remains popular in spite of the increasing number of shopping malls in the city.

The Kapalı Çarşı is the most traditional marketplace in Urfa. Merchants gather and take part in a traditional prayer for "good and fruitful gain" two days per week when they open their shops as part of a "traders' prayer" that dates back to the culture of the Ahi guilds. Traditional artisans make goods for sale here, including shoes, saddles, and metal goods.

Among the bazaars located within the area: Kazaz (Bedesten), Sipahi Pazarı, Kınacı Pazarı, Bakırcılar Çarşısı (coppersmiths' market), Eskici Pazarı, Kuyumcular Çarşısı (jewellers' market), Kunduracılar Pazarı (shoemakers' market). The coppersmiths' bazaar is located south of the bedesten, along with the Haci Kamil Hanı, while the Sipahi Pazarı and the Hüseyniye bazaar are located further west. In the coppersmiths' and tin-beaters' quarter, there is "a vaulted street with shops down either side."

==== Gümrük Hanı ====
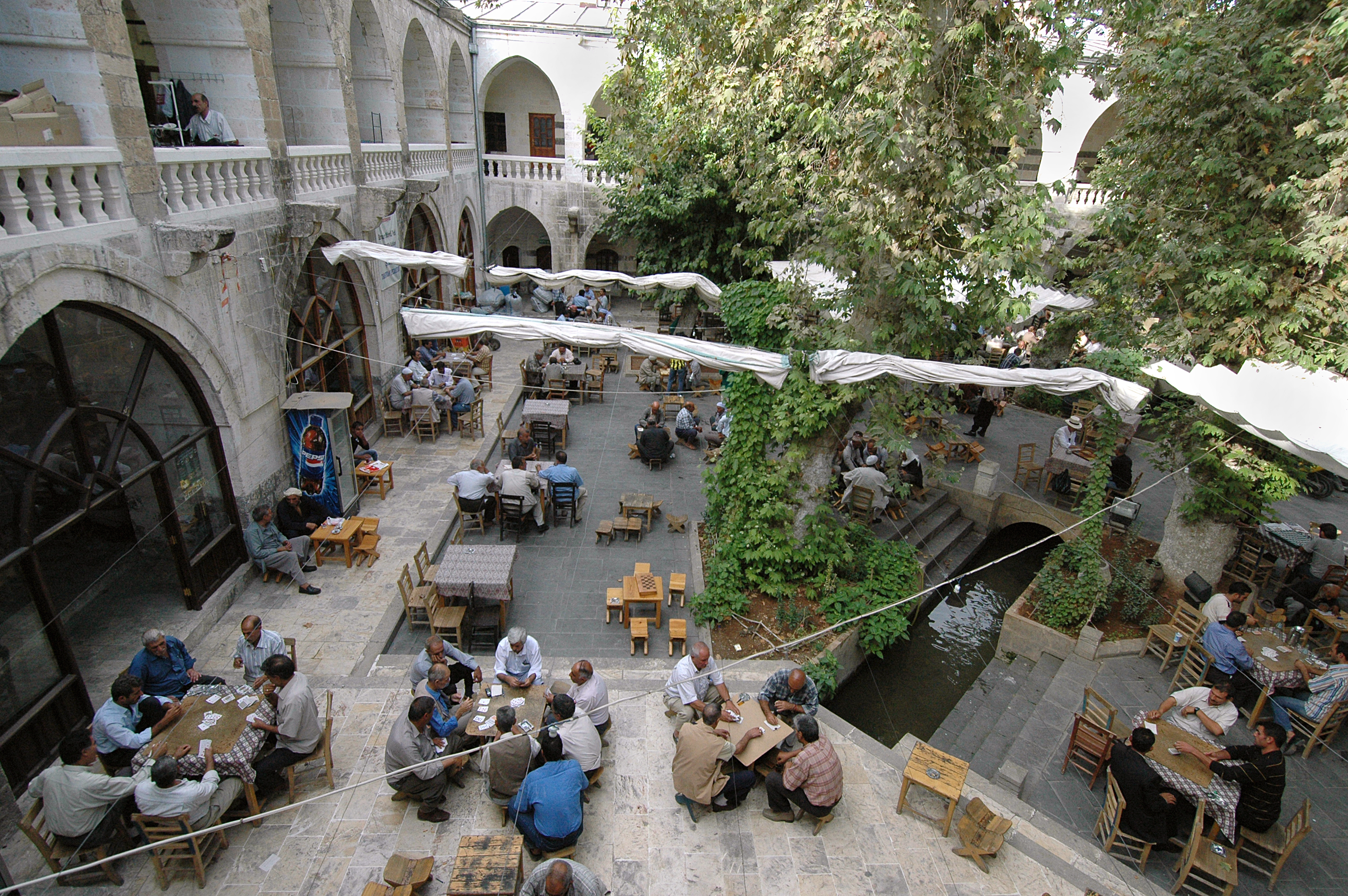
Courtyard of the Gümrük Hanı, or "Customs Inn"

The Gümrük Hanı, or "customs caravanserai", is located in the middle of the Kapalı Çarşı. Variously dated to the late 16th century or the 18th or 19th centuries, it is a two-story building arranged around "a more or less square courtyard". The ground floor is occupied by shops opening up onto the courtyard. Above the shops on the upper level is a portico with access to rooms now used as private apartments. The shady courtyard is filled with tables belonging to teahouses and watch repairers. Just next door to the Gümrük Hanı is a bedestan.

==== Bedesten ====
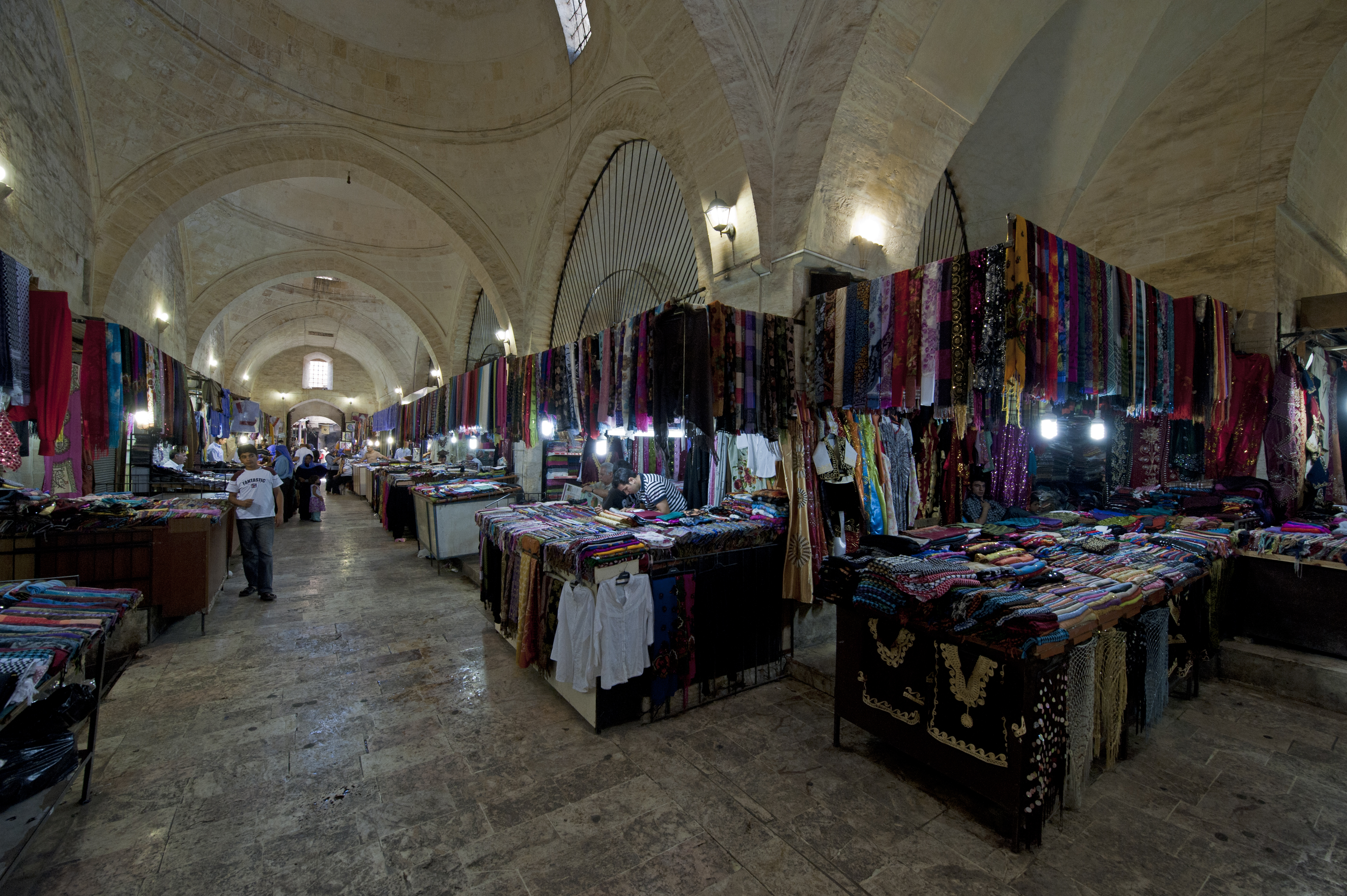
Interior of the bedesten

One of the most important markets in the Kapalı Çarşı is the bedesten, which is located just south of the Gümrük Hanı. Originally built in 1562, it is mentioned as "bezzazistan" in the waqf of Rızvan Ahmet Paşa in 1740. It was restored in 1998 by the Şanlıurfa Culture, Art, and Research Foundation (ŞURKAV). It has gates to 4 surrounding bazaars.

==== Tabakhane Cami ====
The Tabakhane Cami, or "dye-house mosque", dates from the 1700s or early 1800s. Its minaret, however, may be older – perhaps from the 15th or 16th centuries. The mosque's main prayer hall goes east-west, with a groin-vaulted portico on the north side. A rectangular courtyard surrounded by a high wall extends to the north. The main entrance to the whole complex is at the north end of the courtyard's west side, where there is a high and deep porch covered by a high semi-dome. The minaret is located at the east end of the portico; the şerefe at the top features carved designs interspersed with turquoise tiles.

=== Kara Meydanı ===
The Kara Meydanı is located at the north end of Divan Caddesi; north of here it becomes Sarayönü Caddesi. The 19th-century Yusuf Paşa Cami is located here, as is the old Haci Hafiz Efendi house, which is now restored and turned into an art gallery.

== Parks ==
The Akabe recreation area (Akabe Mesire alanı), in Batıkent mahalle, covers 100,00 square meters and was implemented by the Metropolitan Municipality under mayor Zeynel Abidin Beyazgül under the slogan "a greener Şanlıurfa" ("Daha yeşil bir Şanlıurfa"); work completed as of December 2022. It has sports fields, playgrounds, walking trails, and an archery range.

== Gallery ==
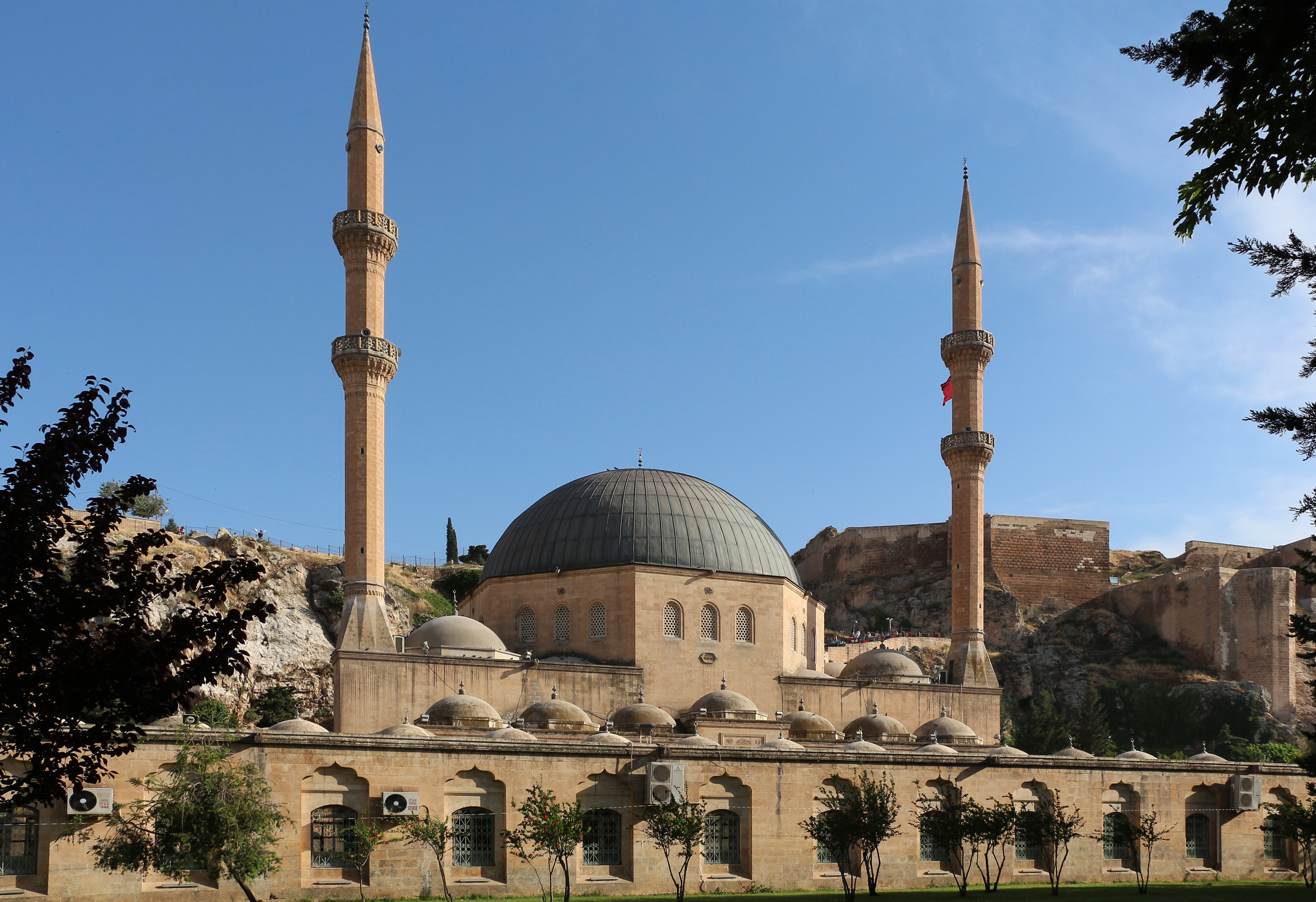
Mevlid-i Halil Mosque, built next to the site where prophet Abraham is believed to have been born.

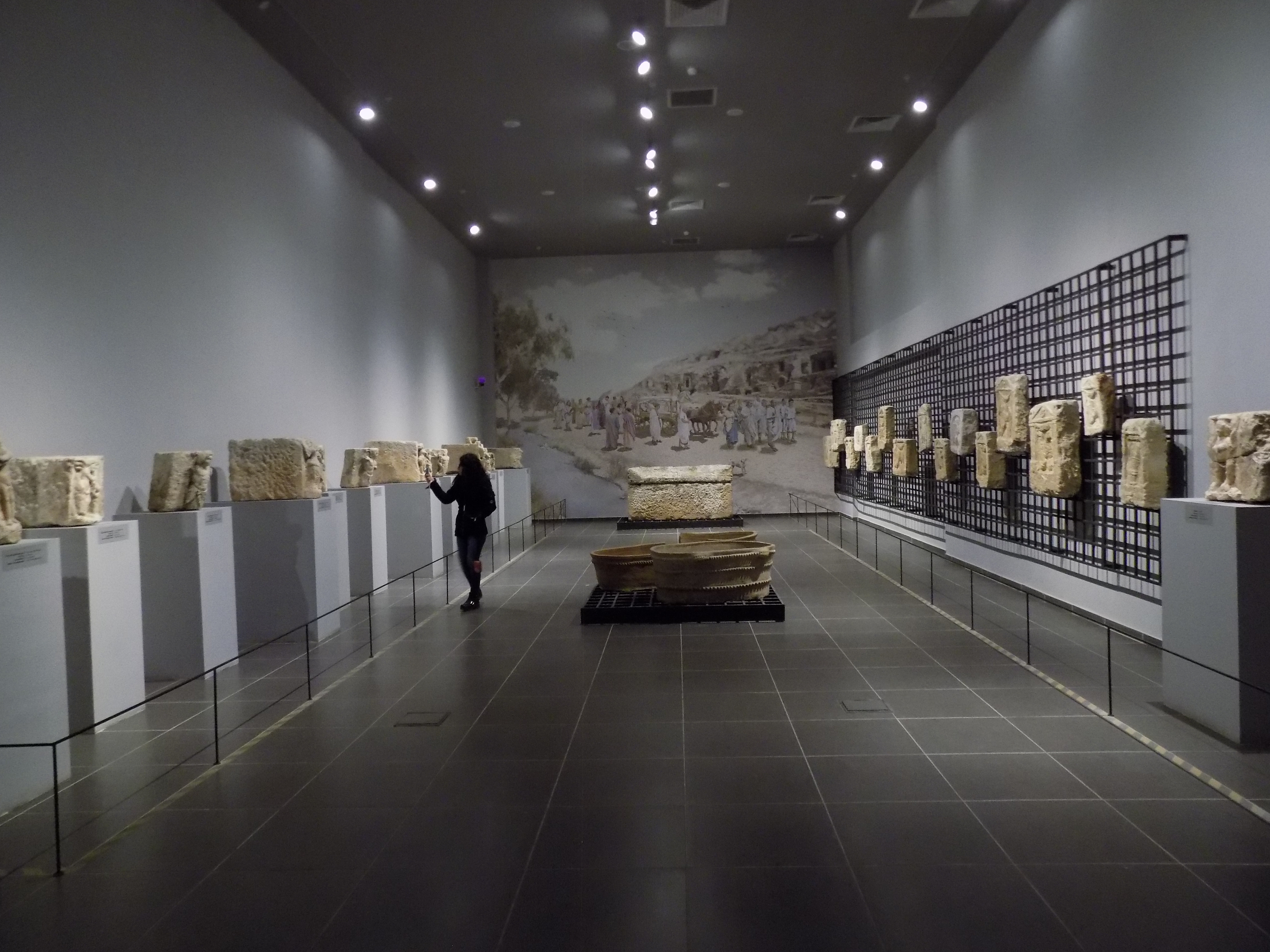
Interior of the Şanlıurfa Museum

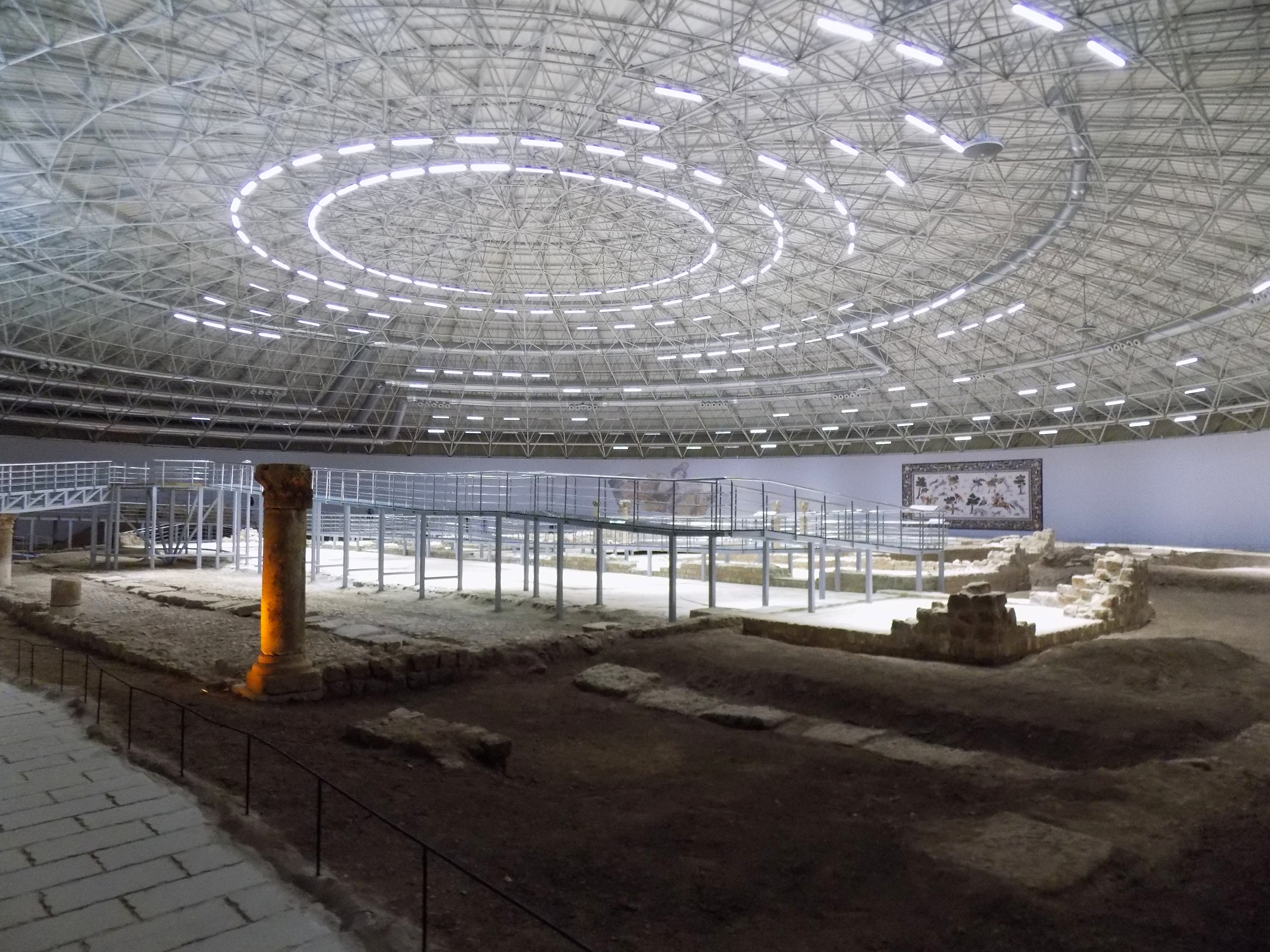
Interior of the Haleplibahçe Mosaic Museum

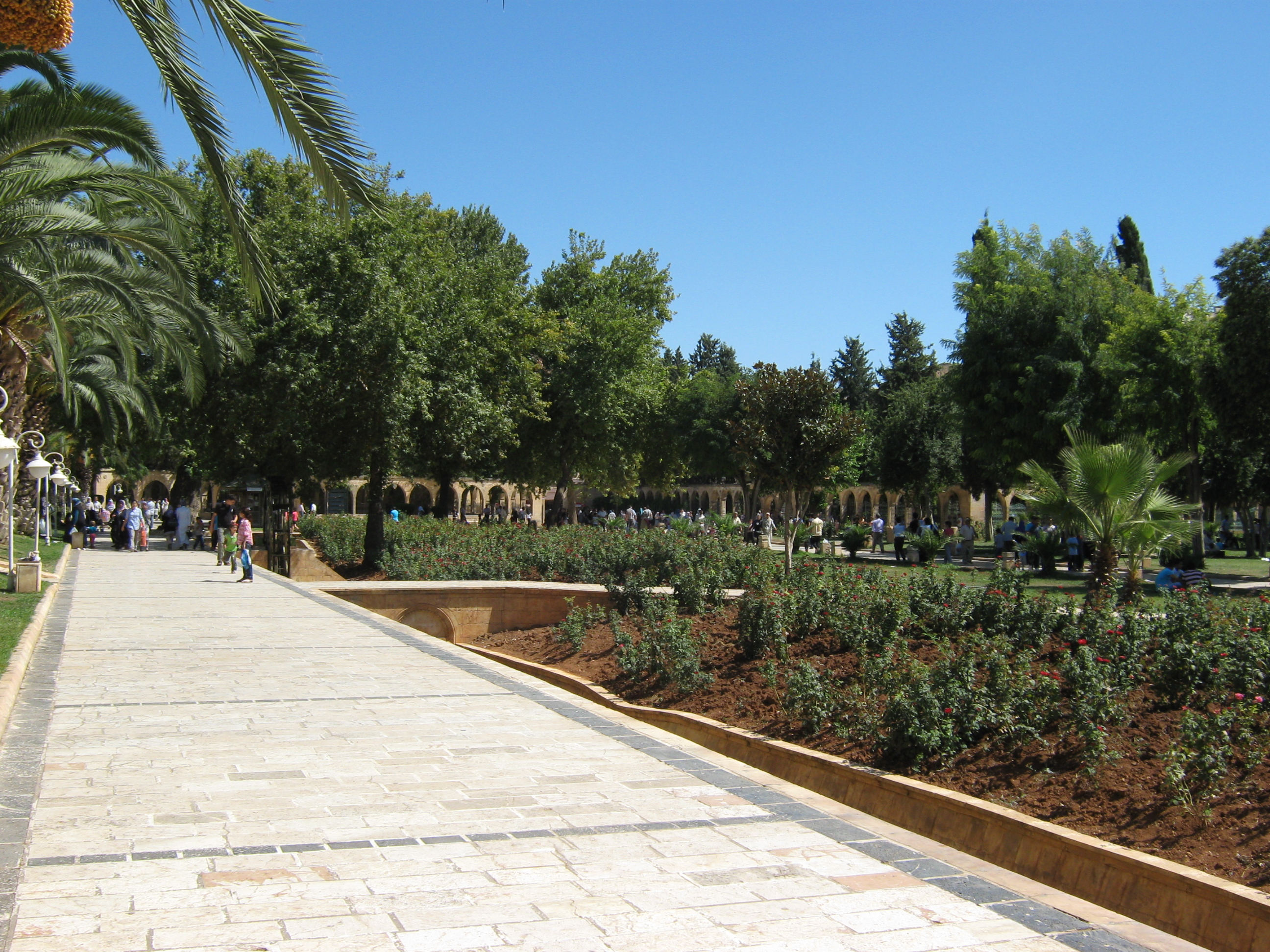
Gölbaşı-Garden

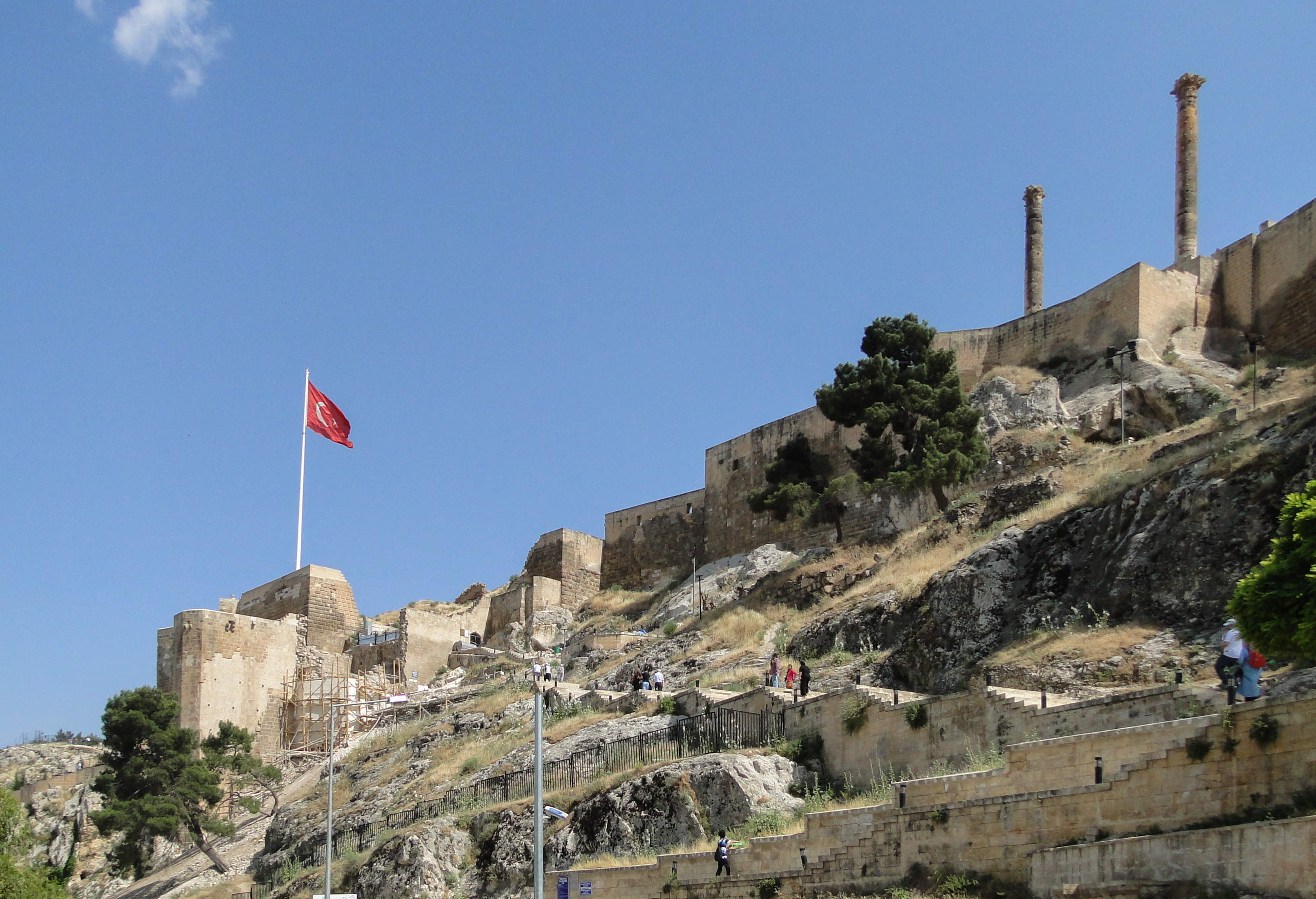
Ruins of Urfa castle

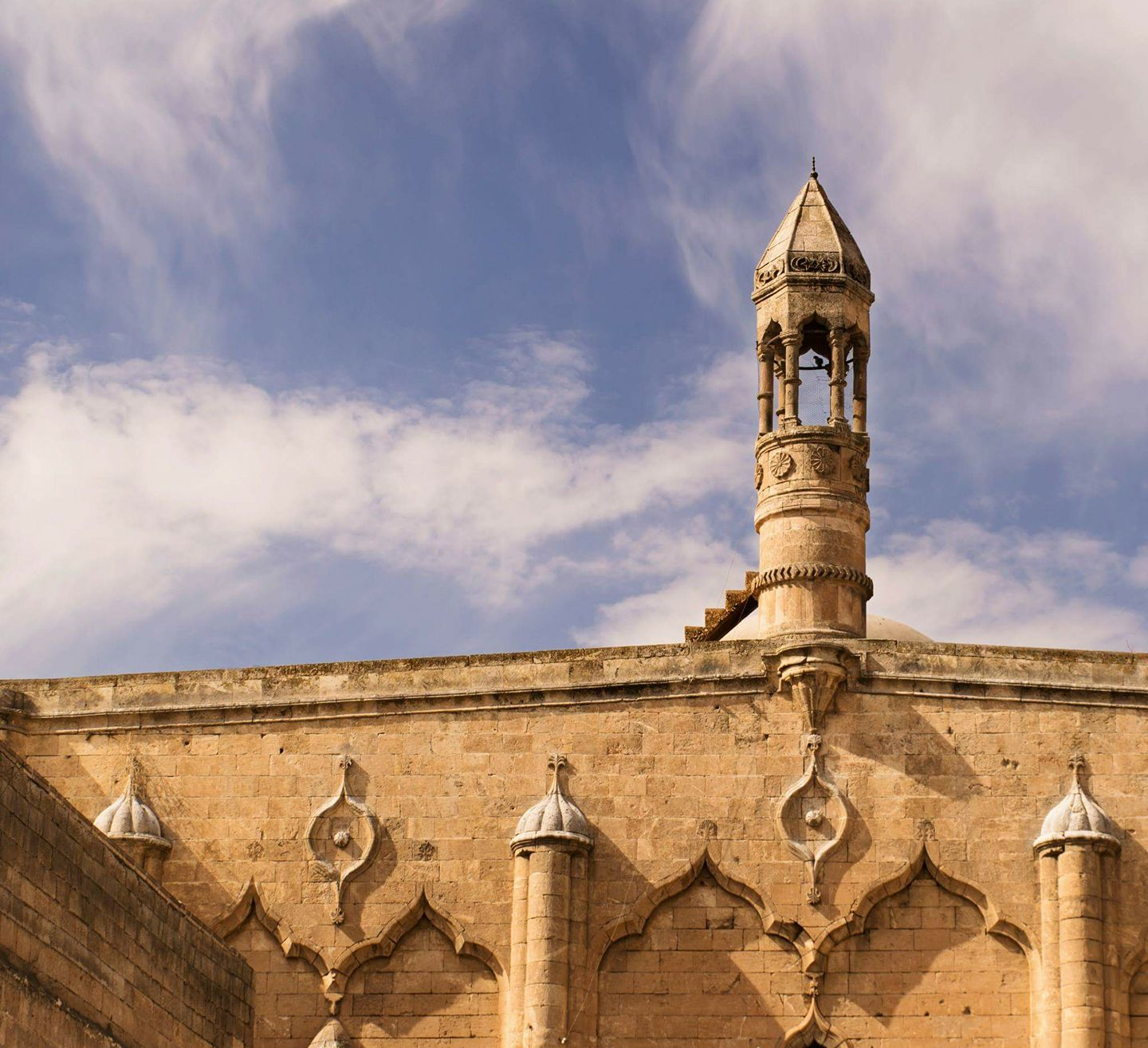
Urfa Armenian Protestant church

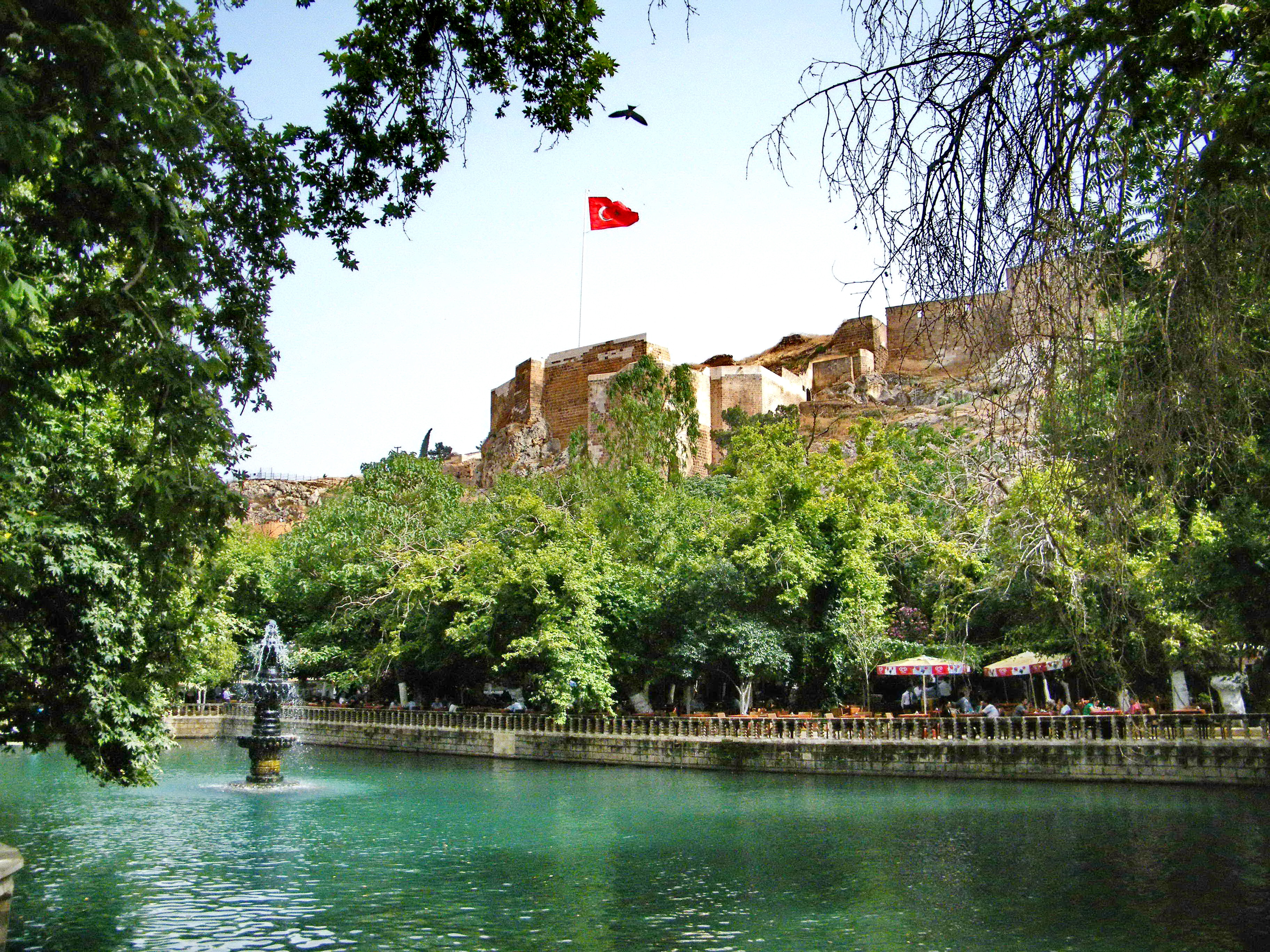
Ayn Zeliha

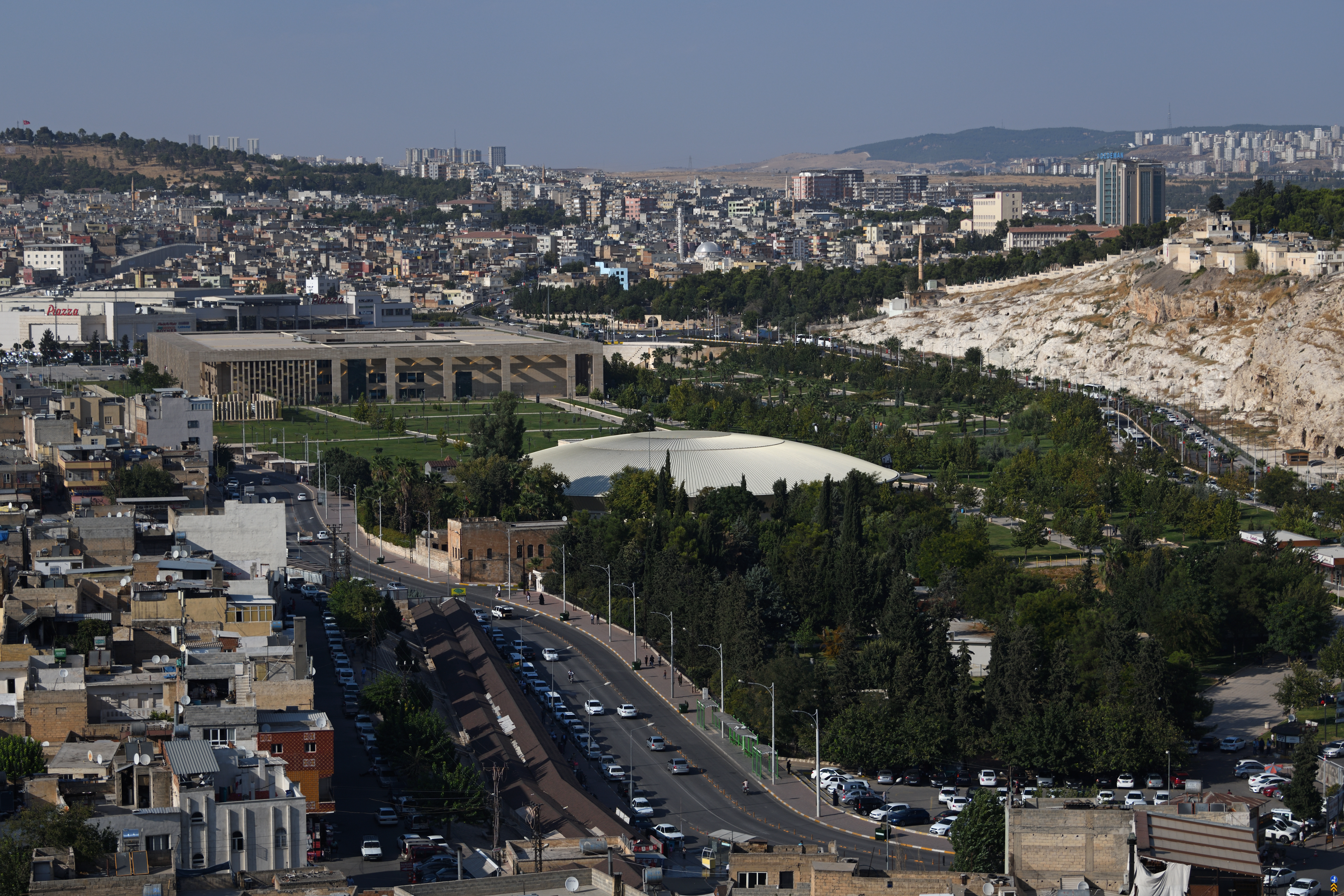
The museum complex, viewed from the south: in the foreground is the Haleplibahçe Mosaic Museum; in the background is the Şanlıurfa Museum.

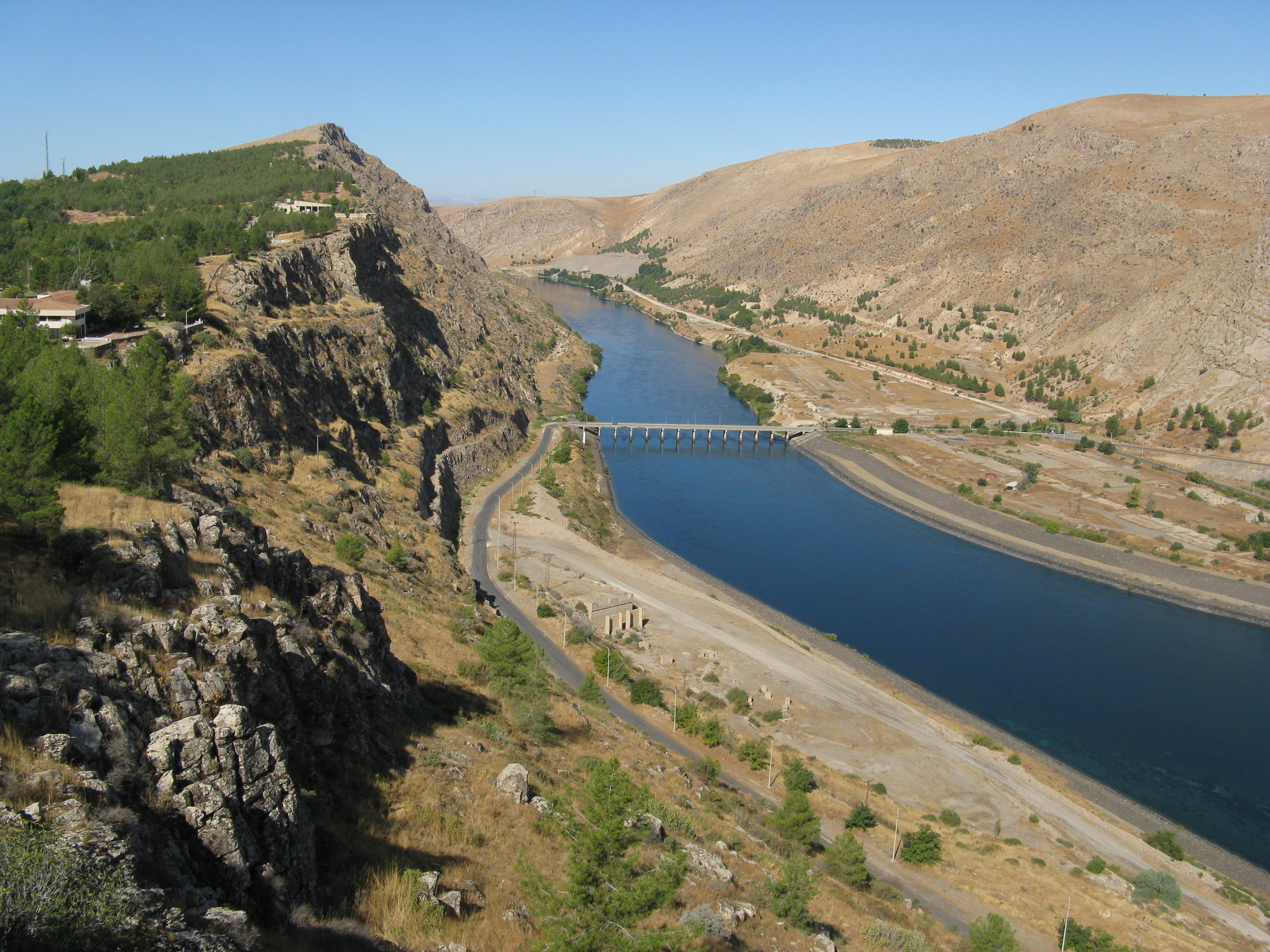
Euphrates River

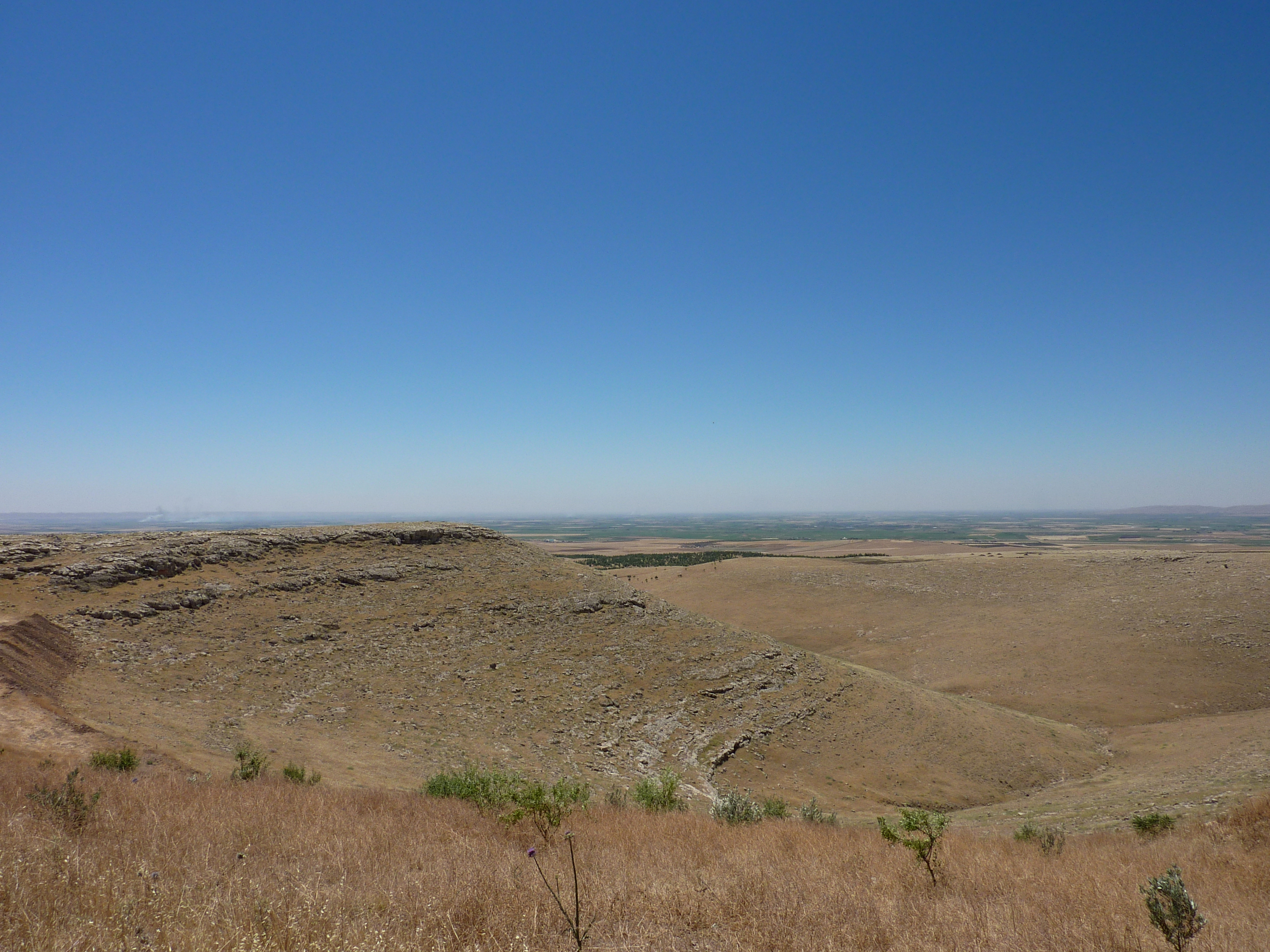
Surrounding fields of Göbekli Tepe, the site of the oldest temple in the world.

== Religious significance ==
According to some Jewish and Muslim traditions, Urfa is Ur Kasdim, the hometown of Abraham, the grandfather of Jacob. This identification was disputed by Leonard Woolley, the excavator of the Sumerian city of Ur in 1927 and scholars remain divided on the issue. Urfa is also one of several cities that have traditions associated with Job.

For the Armenians, Urfa has "great symbolic value" since it is believed that the Armenian alphabet was invented there.

== Politics ==
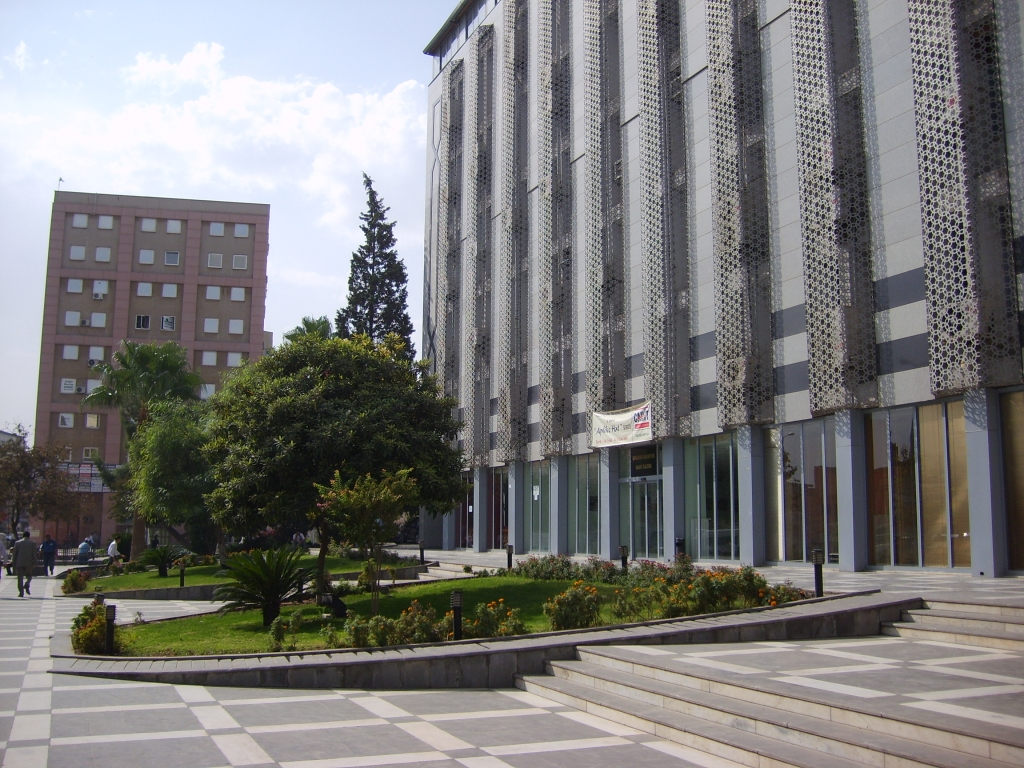
Şanlıurfa Municipality Building on the right

Urfa is a stronghold of the governing Justice and Development Party and is sometimes called a "vote depot" for the party.

From 2004 to 2014, Ahmet Eşref Fakıbaba served as mayor of Urfa for two terms. A popular figure in Urfa politics, Fakıbaba first rose to prominence as Chief Physician at the Şanlıurfa SSK Hospital, a role which he held for 11 years. In 2004 he ran as the AKP candidate in the mayoral election and won. The AKP did not nominate Fakıbaba as their mayoral candidate in the 2009 local elections, saying that they had 70% of the vote in Urfa and could win the election if their candidate was a jacket. However, Fakıbaba ran as an independent and won reelection to a second term. He later joined the Felicity Party before rejoining the AKP in 2013. In 2015, Fakıbaba was elected to the National Assembly as an AKP member, replacing previous Urfa MP Faruk Çelik. He later resigned as MP in 2022.

== Demographics ==
=== History ===
The ethnic and religious demographics of the city have shifted over the centuries and were largely diverse. In ancient times, the region was mixed with Greeks, Arabs, Syrians, and Armenians. At the time of the First Crusade, the majority of the population were either Armenian or Assyrian.

There was an ancient Jewish community in Urfa, with about 1,000 people by the 19th century. Most of them emigrated in 1896, fleeing the Hamidian massacres, and settling mainly in Aleppo, Tiberias and Jerusalem. In 1910, Ely Bannister Soane wrote that apart from Turkish effendis, Urfa was populated by Arabs, Kurds and a large number of Armenians. British forces reported a mixed pre-war population of Kurds, Turks and 7,500 Armenians. The Armenian Patriarchate of Constantinople reported 25,000 to 30,000 Armenians in Urfa and its environs, on an overall population of 60,000. According to Agha Petros, there were 7,200 Syriacs in the city of Urfa, and 8,000 in ten surrounding villages. Joseph Tfinkdji reports 200 Chaldeans. According to 1918 reports of the Urfa mutasarrifate, there were 33,000 Turks, 27,000 Kurds, 12,000 Arabs, 5,500 Armenians, 3,000 Assyrians, and 500 Jews in the central kaza.

The Armenian and Assyrian Genocides, undertaken by Ottoman troops and Ottoman-sponsored militias such as the special organization, led to the slaughter, deportation, and ethnic cleansing of much of the Christian population of Urfa and the surrounding region. Following the establishment of the Republic of Turkey, most of the remaining non-Muslim population left the city due to continued persecution.

==== Language ====
In the early 19th century, the dominant language of the city was Turkish, while Armenian, Syriac, Kurdish, Arabic, and Persian were also spoken. Armenians were observed to speak Turkish to strangers, while Assyrians spoke Arabic.

=== Present-day ===
Today, the city is mainly composed of Arabs and Kurds as well as Turks.

==== Syrian refugees ====
Since the outbreak of the Syrian Civil War, large numbers of refugees from Syria have settled in Urfa because of its closeness to the border and opportunities for employment. As of 2017, as many as 300,000 Syrians live in Urfa, out of the total population of 750,000 in the province. As of 2014, about 79% of Syrian refugees in Urfa were Arabic-speakers, while the other 21% were Kurdish-speakers.

In general, Syrians in Urfa have clustered in areas where home rental prices are lower; typical rents range from 600 to 900 liras (as of 2019). These homes are often small, and often more than one nuclear family shares the same residence, so a 100-140-square-meter may accommodate 6–17 people. Syrians with the lowest incomes are most heavily concentrated in run-down neighborhoods with a lot of squatting that were previously inhabited mostly by poor people who had moved to Urfa from the countryside. Often, they are in outlying neighborhoods far from the city center. The largest number of Syrians in Urfa are in the Haliliye district, where they are especially concentrated in the neighborhoods (mahalles) of Devteşti, Ahmet Yesevi, Süleymaniye, Bağlarbaşı, Şehitlik, Cengiz Topel, Şair Nabi, Yeşildirek, İpekyolu, Sancaktar, İmam Bakır and Yavuz Selim. The second-highest concentration is in Eyyübiye, whose neighborhoods (mahalles) with the highest concentrations of Syrians are Eyyüpnebi, Hayati Harrani, Eyüpkent, Akşemsettin, Yenice, Muradiye, Direkli and Kurtuluş. In both cases, the Syrians here tend to prefer single-story residences where rents are not too high. The third urban district of Urfa, Karaköprü, has a much smaller Syrian presence. This area has been built up significantly in recent decades, with lots of luxury multi-story residences with high rents preferred by middle- and high-income residents. The Syrians who live here mostly had relatively high pre-war incomes. They are clustered in Maşuk, Karşıyaka, Akbayır and Şenevler. As of 2014, the largest concentrations of Syrians in the city were in the mahalles of Hayati Harrani (165 families), Bağlarbaşı (115), Devteşti (105), Ahmet Yesevi (91), and Eyyüpnebi (90 families).

Syrian refugees in Urfa often struggle with financial difficulties and unemployment. The language barrier hinders integration into the surrounding community, and many Syrians tend to form their own communities and interact less with Turkish locals. Many Syrians in Urfa run their own businesses; workplaces belonging to Syrian refugees are clustered around Şehit Nusret Caddesi and Atatürk Boulevard, Sarayönü and Divanyolu Streets, and Haşimiye Meydan. Many Syrians are also self-employed as street vendors, selling food, clothes, toys, and other items.

Before 2017, relations were relatively friendly between Syrians and Turks, but after 2017 relations began to deteriorate as there was a growing perception among Turks that Syrians were to blame for economic stagnation. The rapid increase in Syrian-owned businesses in Urfa, depressed wages for workers, and a perception that Syrians are "cheap labor" have all contributed to anti-Syrian sentiment among Turks. Some Turks also resent the fact that Syrian refugees have free access to healthcare and education. In July 2019, local authorities removed all Arabic-language signs on Syrian-owned businesses in Urfa and made Turkish-language signs mandatory.

== Economy ==
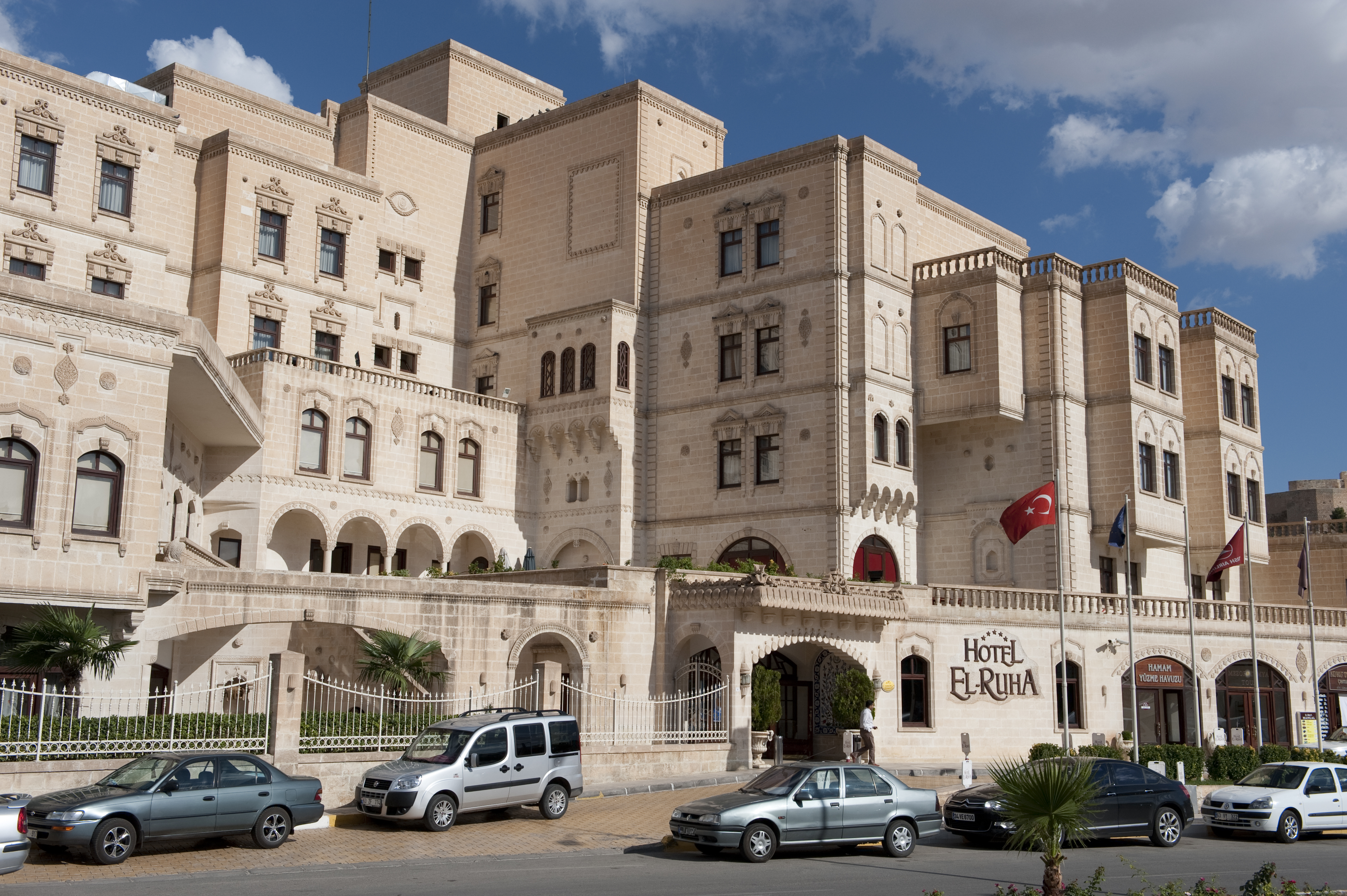
A hotel in Şanlıurfa. Tourism contributes to the economy of the city.

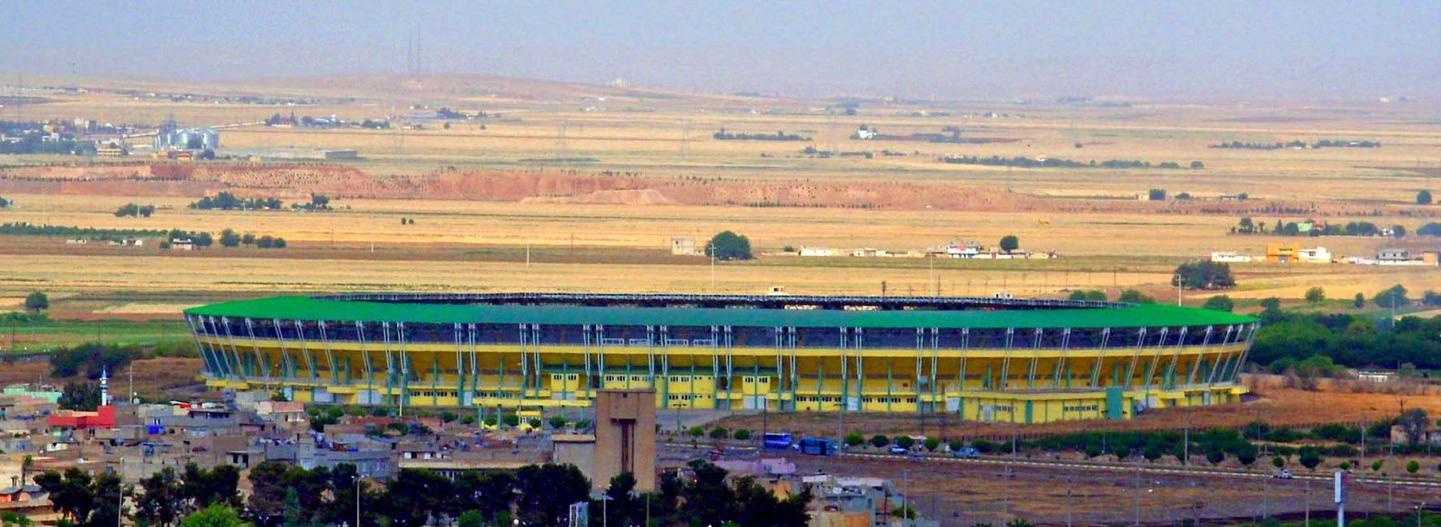
Şanlıurfa GAP Arena is the largest stadium

As of 2018, the average per capita income in Urfa is $4,400 USD per year. As of 2018, unemployment in Urfa is 18%, among young people it is 35%.

Urfa is a center of footwear production in the region, and around 5,000 people are employed in this sector. The Istanbul-based shoe retailer FLO, owned by the Ziylan Group, opened a shoe factory in Urfa in 2012. As of 2018, this factory employed 900 people and was the largest footwear factory in the region, producing 1.8 million pairs of shoes per year. FLO was planning to open a second factory, employing 1,500 more people, in the city in early 2019. According to the province governor Abdullah Erin, there were also plans to open some 13 more shoe factories in the Organized Industrial Zone by 2023, employing as many as 20,000 people and producing 30 million pairs of shoes annually.

Urfa is a major producer of pistachio nuts, with 29.7 million trees in the whole province producing 38,576 tons of pistachios in 2021. However, most processing is done in Gaziantep, which is the other main pistachio producer in Turkey. Both cities' pistachios have geographical indications under different names for different cultivars, with Urfa's officially known as the "Urfa flax village pistachio" (Urfa keten köyneği fıstığı).

=== Handicrafts ===
Urfa has a rich tradition of handicrafts: coppersmiths, furriers, weavers and carpetmakers, felt makers, saddle makers, and jewelers all form part of this tradition. Historically, the various trades had their own bazaars where artisans sold their wares. In the 21st century, however, these handicrafts have been on the decline, and new generations are generally not learning them.

Copper-smithing is relatively prosperous among Urfa's handicrafts, although demand has fallen in favor of more contemporary décor. Many coppersmiths have left the profession altogether, and those who remain often face declining incomes. Jewelry making also remains a thriving business; its continued importance is partly because of traditional wedding customs that are still practiced. The making of prayer beads (tespih) also continues in Urfa, with craftsmen working particularly around the Gümrük Han and the shopping areas around Balıklıgöl. Woodcarvers, although few in number, are still in demand for restoration of old buildings. A few furriers and saddle makers also continue to ply their trades in the city.

Artisanal leather tanning, on the other hand, is no longer practiced in Urfa, and new apprentices are not taught. Professionals now send the hides to industrial-scale leather factories instead. Commercial production of handmade embroidery has also ceased in Urfa, although many women continue the craft for dowry purposes.

=== Limestone quarrying ===
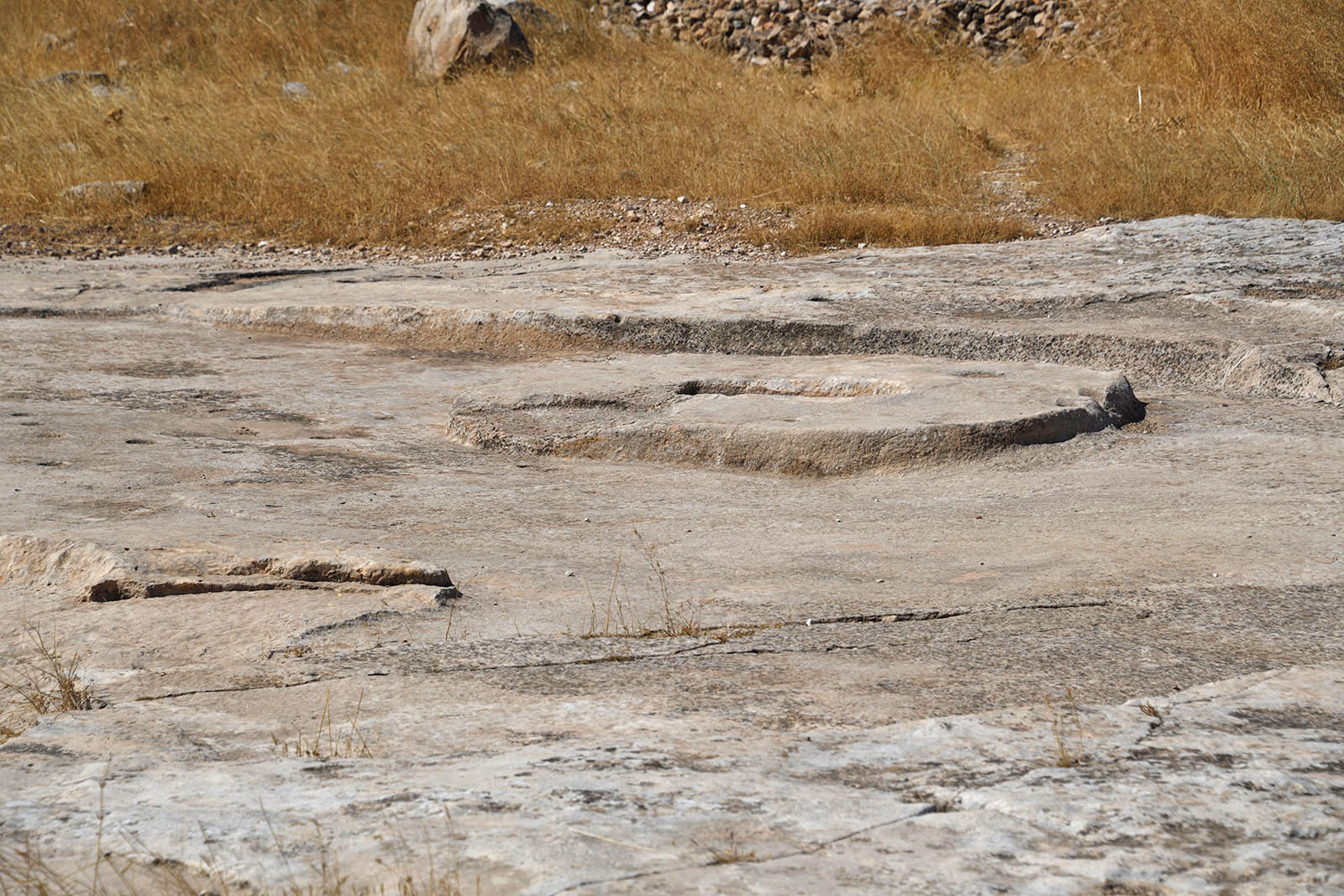
Limestone bedrock at Göbekli Tepe, an example of Urfa limestone

There is an abundance of limestone in the Urfa area, and it has been quarried extensively since ancient times for use as a building material. This limestone, known as Urfa limestone, was mostly deposited in Eocene through Miocene times (about 56-5 million years ago). It has a light, whitish-yellow ochre color. When freshly extracted from the quarry and still rather moist, Urfa limestone is relatively soft and can easily be cut with a handheld saw. Once exposed to the atmosphere, though, its surface gradually hardens so that it makes a suitably strong building material.

Urfa limestone has been quarried for human use since at least the Neolithic period: it was the main building material used at Göbekli Tepe, 12,000 years ago, and the prehistoric quarries and workshops at Göbekli Tepe are among the oldest in the world. On the southern edge of the rocky plateau, there are also traces of quarries dating back to ancient Roman times. Many old quarries in the area were also dug underground, forming artificial caves. The oldest of this type is the massive 4-story Basda quarry, although its precise age is unknown.

A number of active limestone quarries exist today in the Urfa area. Much of the quarrying is done just west of the city, around the Evren Industrial Estate. Şanlıurfa province's total limestone reserves amount to 62.2 million tons, and its industry has an annual processing capacity of 31,680 tons. Many of the stone blocks quarried from the Urfa area are sent to Mardin and Midyat for processing.

Before the introduction of reinforced concrete structures, Urfa limestone was the main building material used for "major" construction projects in the area. Many historical structures in the city were built with this limestone: the castle and city walls, the Ulu Cami, the Halil ür-Rahman and Rızvaniye mosques, and the Gümrük Hanı, as well as many of the old 18th- and 19th-century houses in the old town. It is also used in many contemporary buildings, such as the Mevlana mosque complex. Especially since the start of the GAP in the 1980s, regional demand for Urfa limestone as a construction material has been increasing, particularly since it is cheaper than reinforced concrete. It is also commonly used in combination with other building materials, such as aerated concrete and pumice blocks. In addition to being used as a building block, Urfa limestone is also used for cladding on the outside of walls, as well as decorative finishing on indoor walls. Its use is mostly regional; it is not used much outside the area.

=== Industrial zones ===
==== Organized Industrial Zone ====
The Organized Industrial Zone (Turkish: Organize Sanayi Bölgesi) is located 17 km west of central Urfa on the highway to Gaziantep. Construction started in 1991. The site consists of three areas covering over 1,700 hectares as of 2018. It is home to about 250 companies and employs about 13,000 people.

==== Evren Industrial Estate ====
The Evren Industrial Estate (Turkish: Evren Sanayi Sitesi) is a Small Industrial Site located about 7 km west of central Urfa on the highway to Gaziantep. It covers about 140 hectares and is home to about 1500 businesses. It became operational in 1994. Urfa's limestone quarries are also clustered around here.

== Culture ==
=== Cuisine ===
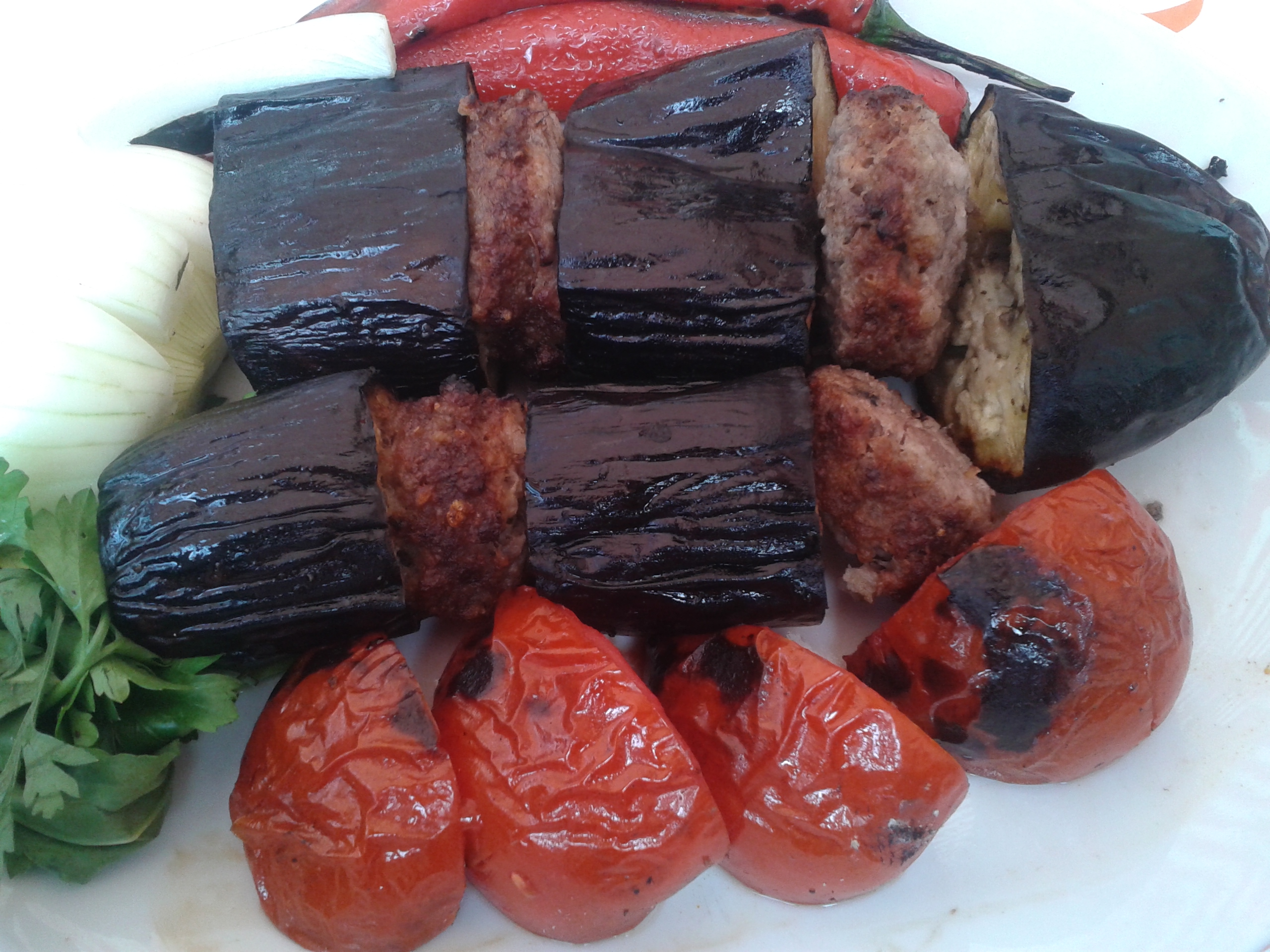
Patlıcan kebap, served at an Urfa-style restaurant in Ankara

As the city of Urfa is deeply rooted in history, so its unique cuisine is an amalgamation of the cuisines of the many civilizations that have ruled in Urfa . It is widely believed that Urfa is the birthplace of many dishes, including Çiğ köfte, that according to the legend, was crafted by the Prophet Abraham from ingredients he had at hand.

Meat-based dishes are a staple of everyday meals in Urfa. There is a local saying, "There is no trouble where meat comes in" (Turkish: et giren yere dert girmez). Foods like lahmacun and kebab are consumed daily by many people. Ciğer kebabı, or liver kebab, is especially popular among poorer Urfalis, since liver is usually a relatively cheap meat. Liver kebab is popularly eaten for either breakfast, lunch, or dinner.

The walnut-stuffed Turkish dessert crepe (called şıllık) is a regional specialty. According to legend, its sweet syrup was first made using molasses from the Hanging Gardens of Babylon.

=== Hospitality ===
Urfali society traditionally places a great value on hospitality, and inviting guests over and sharing food with them has a special importance. Locals attribute this to the prophet Abraham, who according to legend never dined alone — he always had guests over to share his meals with. The locally common epithet "Halil İbrahim Sofrası" ("the tablecloth-like") depicts this characterization.

=== Literature ===
Urfa has a long history of literature, going back to early Christian writers such as Bardaisan and Ibas of Edessa. A prominent medieval writer from Urfa was the 9th century Arabic author al-Ruhawi, whose Adab al-Tabib covered the topic of medical ethics. Later, from the 1600s to the 20th century, divan poetry became popular in Urfa. The popularity of divan poetry in Urfa is unusual because, by the 1600s, Urfa was not a major center of learning that would typically be expected to produce a lot of poetry. In all, 130 different Urfali poets are known from this period. A few of them are Nâbî, Ömer Nüzhet, Admî, Fehim, Hikmet, Şevket, Sakıb, and Emin. Many of them were Sufis, affiliated with orders like the Bektashis, Mevlevis, Naqshbandis, Qadiris, and Rifa'is; they gathered in places like the Hasanpaşa Medrese, the İhlasiye Medrese, the Hasan Paşa Medrese, the Sakıbiye Tekke, the Halil’ür Rahman Medrese, the Rızvaniye Medrese, the Dabbakhane Medrese, and the Eyyübî Medrese. Urfali divan poets almost exclusively used the ghazala form, with almost no known examples of the qasida.

=== Traditional house architecture ===
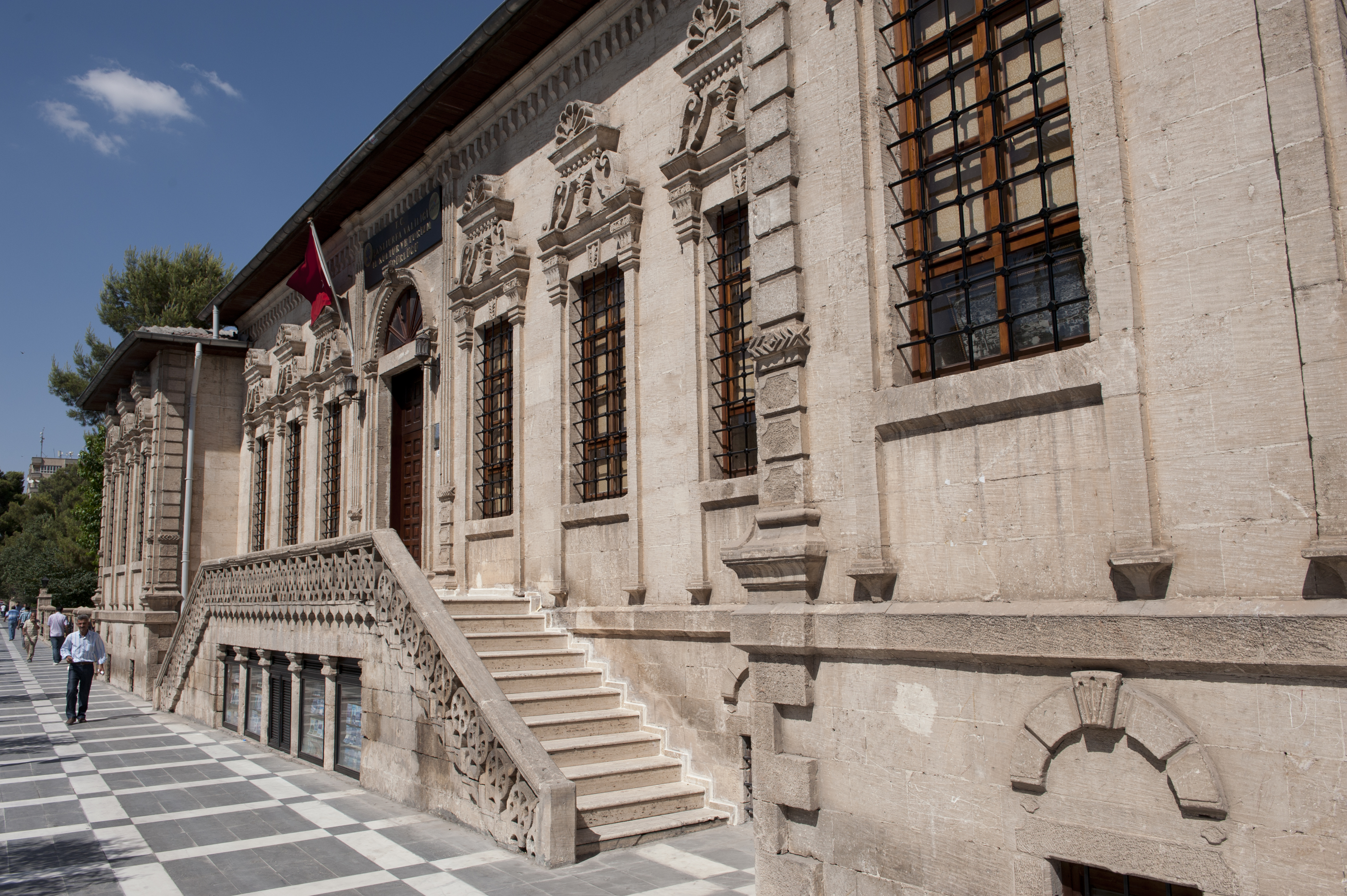
Şanlıurfa Provincial Directorate of Culture and Tourism Building

Urfa's old town has many old courtyard houses; many were built during a construction boom in the 19th century. A typical Urfa courtyard house is centered around a high-walled courtyard that is closed to the street. Facing the courtyard is a porticoed antechamber covered by a roof and partially surrounded by three walls. In Urfa, the name for this space is mastaba; elsewhere, the more general term is iwan. Other typical rooms include bedrooms, a kitchen (tandir), a sitting room, or a water closet. There is also a semi-basement called the zerzembe, which is used for winter food storage and is practically omnipresent in traditional Turkish homes in regions with hot climates. The house as a whole, with its courtyard, mastaba, and other rooms, forms one integrated living space rather than each room being its own "isolated, independent" space.

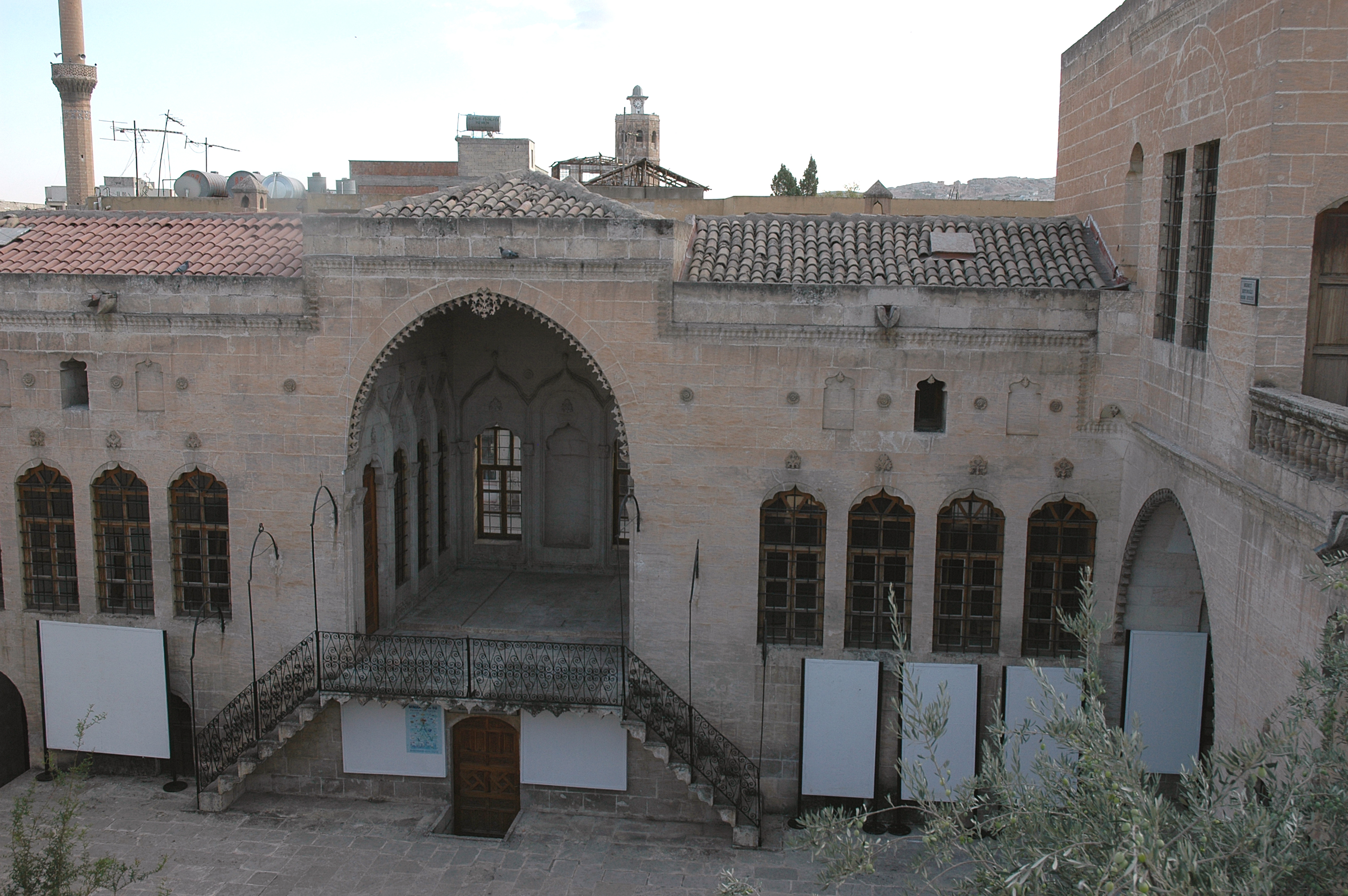
The Hacı Hafız house, now used as an art gallery, is a good example of traditional Urfa house architecture from the 1800s. The grand mastaba is in the middle. Below it is the entrance to the zerzembe.

An important consideration in domestic architecture is mahremiyat, which could roughly be translated into English as "privacy" or "intimacy" but which carries stronger implications. This concept is especially important when it comes to relations between men and women – outside the extended family, interaction between men and women is restricted. As a result, traditional Urfa houses are constructed in ways to prevent men outside from viewing the women of the household. For example, doors facing each other, windows facing the street, and significant differences in roof elevation are all avoided.

=== Local Turkic variety ===
Turkish linguist Bilgehan A. Gökdağ classifies the Turkic language spoken in Urfa within the Oghuz branch of the Turkic languages. According to Turkish linguist Mehmet Adil Saraç, the Turkic language spoken in Urfa is the language of Turkmens whose migrations and settlements in the region span nearly 1,200 years. He identifies the Turkic language spoken in Urfa today as none other than the language of the Aq Qoyunlu. Saraç further states that this language was the Turkic language spoken in Transoxiana (Maveraünnehir), which was brought to Urfa through successive Turkmen migrations.

Saraç argues that, if the Turkic language spoken in Urfa is to be classified within a Turkic dialect group, the Kirkuk Turkic variety of Iraqi Turkmen is the most appropriate comparison on historical, geographical and phonetic grounds. He also notes a longstanding folk tradition describing the relationship between Urfa and Kirkuk as that of "maternal uncle and nephew" (dayı–yeğen). Throughout his work, he consistently prefers the expression "the Turkic language spoken in Urfa" rather than "the Urfa dialect".

According to Turkish linguist Sadettin Özçelik, the Turkic language spoken in Urfa preserves historical phonological features and forms inherited from Old Turkic. Its phonetic system includes distinctions beyond those represented in standard written Turkish. Özçelik's transcription distinguishes additional vowel qualities, including ė (a closed vowel between e and i), í (between ı and i), á (between a and e), and ó (between o and ö), as well as consonantal distinctions represented by ġ (ghayn), ḳ (qāf), and ẖ (ḫāʾ), which occur in words of Turkic origin. The letter ẖ (ḫāʾ) also occurs in Arabic loanwords, alongside ḥ (ḥāʾ) and ᶜ (ʿayn), which occur mainly in Arabic loanwords. Özçelik also describes vowel harmony as a prominent feature of Urfa speech, noting that harmony generally predominates and also affects borrowed words.

Özçelik also gives a number of examples of historical preservation from Old Turkic, including alma (< Old Turkic alma), altun (< altun), ėyí (< edgü), beglen (< beg), bişer (< biş-), tırlıġ (< türlüg), yaẖanır (< yaykan-), onda (< anda), ögde (< öng), and others. He also traces several grammatical forms in Urfa speech to Old Turkic, including forms of the locative, directive, and instrumental/comitative suffixes. Linguist İsmail Güneş likewise identifies archaic features preserved in the Turkic language spoken in Urfa and describes the continuation of forms inherited from Old Turkic, including the preservation of word-initial /b-/, /k-/, and /t-/; Urfa examples include bişen, kölgelıẖ, and tikmíşem, among others.

In a comparative study, Güneş also notes that the Turkic language spoken in Urfa shows similarities with both Azerbaijani Turkic and the Kirkuk Turkic variety of Iraqi Turkmen. In his comparison of Urfa with Azerbaijani Turkic, Güneş identifies a wide range of phonological and grammatical similarities. These include similarities in vowel harmony, consonant changes and losses, metathesis, consonant gemination, verb conjugation and person endings, reflected in Urfa forms such as pıçaẖ, ayaġ, daşın-, çaẖmaẖ, torpaġ, dorġı, ikkí, ürek, çüt, yuẖa, tanışiyıẖ, alacaẖsız, aliyıẖ, göraẖ, and alım.

== Education ==
=== Harran University ===
Harran University was established in Urfa in 1992 as an amalgamation of several different faculties that had previously been attached to two different universities.

=== Former vocational schools ===
==== Mekteb-i Sanayi ====
By 1906, the presence of a vocational school in Urfa called the Mekteb-i Sanayi is attested. It was used as a hospital for wounded fighters during the Turkish War of Independence. This school stayed open after the war and is attested again in 1927, by then under the name of Urfa Male Industry School (Urfa Erkek Sanayi Mektebi). This school's building was demolished in the late 1930s and the Halkevi building was built on its site.

==== Urfa Girls' Institute ====
The Urfa Girls' Institute (Turkish: Urfa Kız Enstıtüsü), which opened in 1942, was an early vocational school teaching practical trades and general subjects to girls and young women.

==== Urfa Institute of Art for Boys ====
The boys' equivalent to the Girls' Institute was Urfa Institute of Art for Boys (Turkish: Urfa Erkek Sanat Enstıtüsü), which provided vocational education to boys aged 12 to 17.

== Health ==
=== Old state hospital ===
The old state hospital in Urfa was established by Ethem Bey in 1903 and became a public hospital in 1943. This hospital eventually came to comprise four different buildings, serving as the A, B, C, and D blocks. The A-block building, which was three stories tall, opened in 1962 and was originally dedicated to treatment of tuberculosis. The B-block building opened in 1972 and had 200 beds. The D block was for emergency care. Demolition of the old state hospital, which was located in Atatürk mahalle of Haliliye district, was completed in 2022. At the time of the demolition, the provincial health directorate was planning to build a new 150-bed children's hospital on the site.

=== Şanlıurfa Balıklıgöl State Hospital ===
The Şanlıurfa Balıklıgöl State Hospital (Şanlıurfa Balıklıgöl Devlet Hastanesi) was established in 1963 as a "Health Station" (Sağlık İstasyonu), and then became a dispensary in 1975. In July 1983, it became the Şanlıurfa SSK Hastanesi and was operating as an inpatient facility with 150 beds. In addition, a 5-story outpatient department building began construction in 1991 and then became operational in 1994. It was renamed in 2005 to its current name.

=== Şanlıurfa Training and Research Hospital ===
The Training and Research Hospital (Şanlıurfa Eğitim Ve Araştırma Hastanesi) was established in 1973 with 125 beds. Originally, it was a branch hospital under the State Hospital, until 1984. From 1984 until 2004, it was a gynecology and pediatric hospital, and in 2004 it was split in two: the gynecology and obstetric hospital, which remained in the same building, and the pediatric hospital, which moved into the old State Hospital building. In 2016, the two branch hospitals were combined together into the Training and Research Hospital in the current building due to a shortage of beds. The current building, as of 2019, covers over 100,000 square meters and has 400 patient rooms (with separate beds and restrooms), 18 operating rooms (2 of which are set aside for "maternity emergencies"), a 180-person conference hall, and an 80-person training hall, as well as a helipad and a parking lot with 1,200 spaces. The hospital covers gynecology, pediatric, and adult healthcare.

=== Mehmet Akif İnan Training and Research Hospital ===
The Mehmet Akif İnan Training and Research Hospital (Mehmet Akif İnan Eğitim ve Araştırma Hastanesi) opened in 2004 and handles as many as 3,500 to 6,000 patient applicants per day. It has 500 beds (rooms have 1, 2, or 3 beds, as well as their own restrooms) and a conference hall that can seat 156 people. There is a blood center, a dialysis unit, and an intensive care unit, as well as a physical therapy unit for outpatients.

== Transport ==
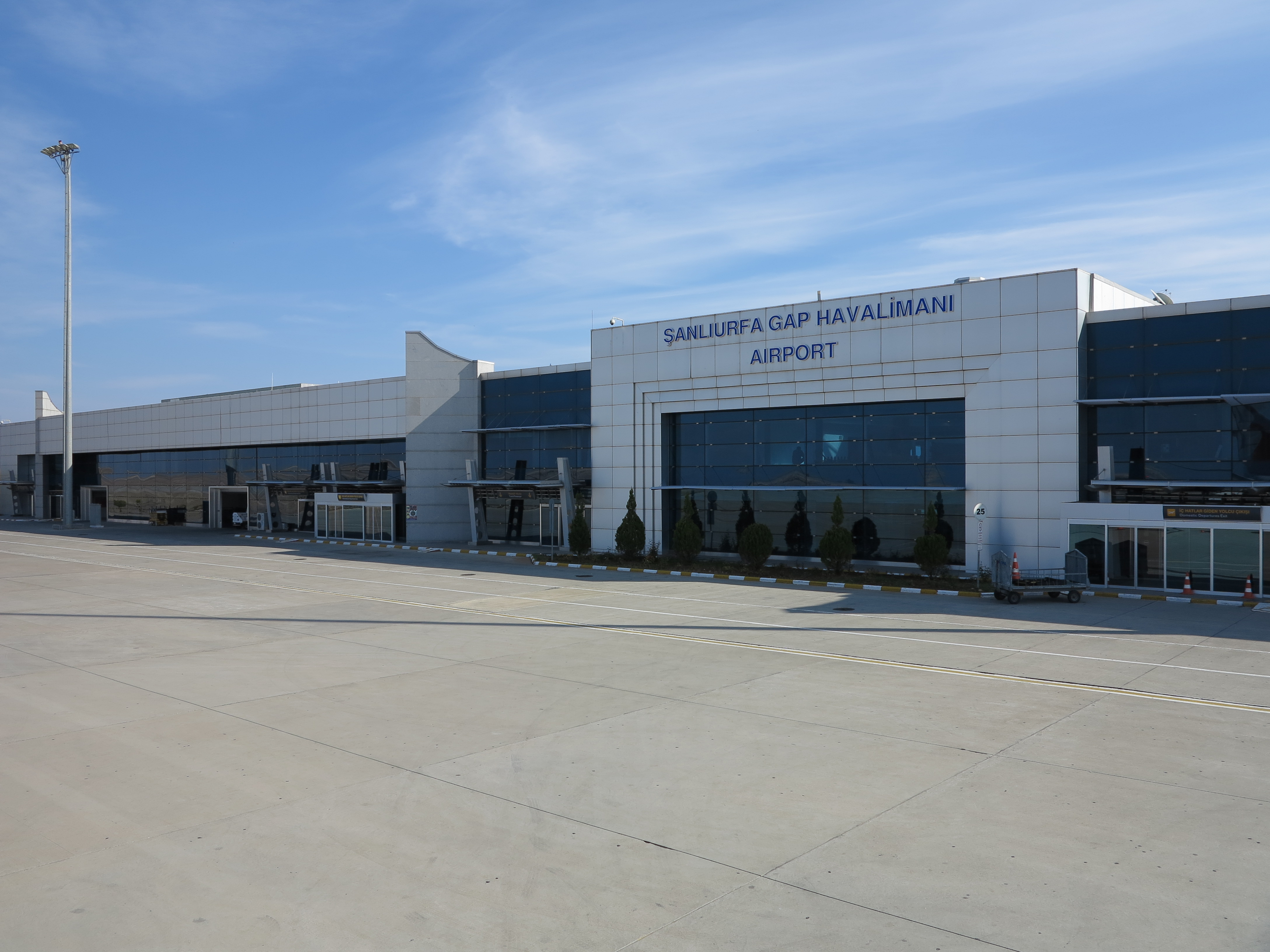
Şanlıurfa GAP Airport

Şanlıurfa GAP Airport is located about 34 km (21 mi) northeast of the city and has direct flights to Istanbul, Ankara and Izmir. The main highway from Gaziantep to Diyarbakır now bypasses Urfa on the northwest.

Construction of the first phase of a planned four-route, 78 km network of trolleybus lines began in late 2017, and the first of 10 bi-articulated trolleybuses built by manufacturer Bozankaya was received in September 2018. However, work on additional vehicles was suspended because of various problems, and in 2020 the single vehicle delivered in 2018 remained the only trolleybus completed. In late 2020, the original order for 10 bi-articulated vehicles was replaced by one for 12 standard-articulated vehicles, and the first of these was delivered in April 2022. The trolleybus line opened for service on 28 April 2023, by which time six of the 12 vehicles had been received. However, because of earthquake damage to certain streets in February 2023, among other factors, several temporary changes were made to the planned route after completion of the overhead wiring and other infrastructure such that, after the line's opening, the vehicles initially operated as trolleybuses on only about 600 metres of the now-7.1-km route. The trolleybuses are able to operate on battery power on sections of the route that are not equipped with overhead wires and recharge their batteries during an extended layover at the terminus. By July 2024, following repairs to the earthquake-damaged streets, the trolleybus service finally began following the originally planned route, which is equipped with overhead wires over most sections. Numbered 63, the route begins at Emirgan Aktarma Merkezi.

== Twin towns and sister cities ==
- Urmia, Iran (since 2025)

== See also ==
- Cilicia War
- Urfa Resistance
- Chronology of the Turkish War of Independence
- Cities of the ancient Near East
- Haliliye
- Karaköprü
- Göbekli Tepe
- Ur of the Chaldees in southern Iraq, also claimed as the birthplace of Abraham
- Yezda Urfa
