= Abdulsamet Ocakoğlu =

Turkish para arm wrestler (born 2000)

Personal information
- Nationality: Turkish
- Born: 2000 (age 25–26) Haliliye, Şanlıurfa, urkey
- Education: Sport management at Muş Alparslan University

Sport
- Country: Turkey
- Sport: Para armwrestling
- Club: Depsaş Enerji
Medal record
Armwrestling
Representing Turkey
World Para Armwrestling Championships
Silver medal – second place	2025 Albena	65 kg
Gold medal – first place	2024 Chișinău	65 kg
Silver medal – second place	2023 Almaty	65 kg
European Para Armwresting Championships
Gold medal – first place	2024 Bratislava	65 kg
Gold medal – first place	2023 Chișinău	65 kg
Gold medal – first place	2022 Bucharest	65 kg

Abdulsamet Ocakoğlu (born 2000) is a Turkish world and European champion para arm wrestler.

== Personal life ==
Abdulsamet Ocakğlu was born in Haliliye District of Şanlıurfa Province, southeastern Turkey in 2000.

He is a student of Sport management in the Sports Science Faculty at Muş Alparslan University.

== Sport career ==
Ocakoğlu caught the attention of his school teachers by defeating his four-years older brother in arm wrestling. Encouraged by his school teachers, he then became involved in arm wrestling. He came second in the Turkish Championship, which he participated in for the first time in 2016. He became Turkish champion in his second year after being admitted to the national team. He competes in both, the paralympic armwrestling due to the disability in his right hand and also normal armwrestling. He is a member of Depsaş Enerji Sports Club. He trains at the sport hall of the Haliliye Municipality.

He achieved a world champion, three European champion, and eight Turkish champion titles, as well as a world runner-up title, a European third-place finish, and numerous other accolades in national competitions, all in just nine years.

He became champion at the 2022 WAF Armwrestling European & Para Armwrestling Championships in Bucharest, Romania. At the 2023 World Armwrestling & Para-Armwrestling Championships in Almaty, Kazakhstan, he took the silver medal in the 65 kg event. He won the gold medal at the 2023 WAF Armwrestling European & Para Armwrestling Championships i Chișinău, Moldova. In 2024, he captured the gold medal at the 45th World Armwrestling & 26th World Para-Armwrestling Championships in Chișinău, Moldova. In 2024, he captured his third gold medal at the WAF Armwrestling European & Para Armwrestling Championships in Bratislava, Slovakia. He won the silver medal at the 2025 World Armwrestling & Para-Armwrestling Championships in Albena, Bulgaria.
