= Çamurlu =

Çamurlu, meaning "muddy" in Turkish, may refer to:

== Places ==
- Çamurlu, Göynücek, a village in Göynücek district of Amasya Province, Turkey
- Çamurlu, Hınıs
- Çamurlu, Horasan
- Çamurlu, Hopa, a village in Hopa district of Artvin Province, Turkey
- Çamurlu, Şanlıurfa, a village in the Merkez district of Şanlıurfa Province, Turkey
- Çamurlu, Savaştepe, a village
- Ceamurlia de Jos (derived from Çamurlu), a commune in the southeast of the Tulcea County of Romania

== Other uses ==
- Battle of Çamurlu, the battle fought in 1413 between Ottoman prince brothers Musa Çelebi and Mehmet I
- Çamurlu oil field, an oil field discovered 1975 in southeastern Turkey
