= Urfa butter =

Urfa butter (Turkish: Urfa yaği), also called Urfa clarified butter (Turkish: Urfa sadeyaği), is a type of clarified butter made from sheep's milk that is distinct to the Turkish city of Urfa and the surrounding region. It is produced from the milk of the Üveysi sheep pastured on the southern outskirts of the Karaca Dağ and on the Tektek Dağ. The plants growing in these hilly regions form part of the sheep's diet and impart a slightly distinct flavor to their milk. Like other sheep's milk products, Urfa butter has a high percentage of milk fat. Besides Urfa itself, Urfa butter is also made in other parts of Şanlıurfa province, such as Siverek, Viranşehir, Ceylanpınar, and Harran.

== Production ==
There is no single, standardized production method for Urfa butter, so its composition and fat content can vary somewhat depending on the sample. The sheep are milked in the spring, and the milk is boiled. Then the milk is churned to produce butter, which is then melted to separate the butterfat from the milk solids and water. Today the clarifying process is done by machine, but in the past it was done manually in containers made from animal skins.
