= Yeniköy, Şanlıurfa =

Yeniköy
- Neighbourhood
- Location in Turkey Yeniköy (Şanlıurfa)
- Coordinates: 37.1264°N 38.8915°E
- Country: Turkey
- Province: Şanlıurfa
- District: Haliliye
- Population (2022): 926
- Time zone: UTC+3 (TRT)

Yeniköy is a neighbourhood of the municipality and district of Haliliye, Şanlıurfa Province, Turkey. Its population is 926 (2022). The village is built on top of an archaeological mound where a survey found Early Bronze Age remains.
