= Boydere, Şanlıurfa =

Boydere
- Neighbourhood
- Location in Turkey Boydere (Şanlıurfa)
- Coordinates: 37.11443°N 38.87971°E
- Country: Turkey
- Province: Şanlıurfa
- District: Haliliye
- Population (2022): 901
- Time zone: UTC+3 (TRT)

Boydere is a neighbourhood of the municipality and district of Haliliye, Şanlıurfa Province, Turkey. Its population is 901 (2022). There is an archaeological mound located underneath the village; an archaeological survey here unearthed Early Bronze Age and Roman-era artifacts.
