= Gölpınar =

Gölpınar can refer to:

- Gölpınar, Adıyaman
- Gölpınar Dam
- Gölpınar, Erzincan
- Gölpınar, Şanlıurfa
