= Göktepe (disambiguation) =

Göktepe can refer to:

- Göktepe
- Göktepe, Akçakoca
- Göktepe, Balya
- Göktepe, Biga
- Göktepe, Çermik
- Göktepe, Çınar
- Göktepe, Karayazı
- Göktepe, Orhaneli
- Göktepe, Şanlıurfa
