= Konuklu =

Konuklu (literally "guest place") is a Turkish place name that may refer to the following places in Turkey:

- Konuklu, Aydın, a village in the district of Aydın, Aydın Province
- Konuklu, Besni, a village in the district of Besni, Adıyaman Province
- Konuklu, Kulp
- Konuklu, Şanlıurfa, a municipality in the Merkez district of Şanlıurfa Province
- Konuklu, Ulus, a village in the district of Ulus, Bartın Province
