= Kısas, Haliliye =

Village in Şanlıurfa Province, Turkey

Kısas
- Neighbourhood
- Location in Turkey Kısas (Şanlıurfa)
- Coordinates: 37.1058°N 38.9315°E
- Country: Turkey
- Province: Şanlıurfa
- District: Haliliye
- Population (2022): 3,555
- Time zone: UTC+3 (TRT)

Kısas is a neighbourhood of the municipality and district of Haliliye, Şanlıurfa Province, Turkey. Its population is 3,555 (2022). Before the 2013 reorganisation, it was a town (belde).

It is built on top of an old archaeological mound (höyük) which has not been excavated because it lies completely under the town. Kısas is distinct because it has a predominantly Alevi Turkmen population, whereas most of the surrounding villages are populated by Arabs. It is one of only three villages in the area with a predominantly Alevi Turkmen population (the other two are Akarpınar and Sırrın). According to Mehmet Adil Saraç, the Alevi Turkmen community here has its origins in people fleeing from the Mongol invasions during the Middle Ages.

Kısas maintains strong Turkmen cultural traditions such as âşık folk poetry set to bağlama music. The âşık tradition is particularly associated with the village, and it is known as "land of the âşıks". Âşıks in Kısas stay in one place, unlike the tradition in regions further east where they tend to be itinerant. Instead, the Kısas âşıks mostly earn a living through farming or "doing practical jobs locally". Their main role is performing at Alevi cem rituals, as well as at the muhabbet, or informal conversation preceding a cem. They also perform at wedding ceremonies.
