= Istanbul Volleyball Club =

İstanbul Voleybol
- Full name: İstanbul Voleybol Kulübü
- Short name: İVK
- Founded: 2010
- Ground: TVF 50th Anniversary Sport Hall (Capacity: 1,288)
- Chairman: (Turkey) Nüket Yolaç
- Manager: (Turkey) Kerem Akkaya
- Website: Club home page

Istanbul Volleyball Club (Turkish: İstanbul Voleybol Kulübü: İVK) is a sports club founded in 2010 in Üsküdar district of Istanbul, Turkey. Apart from volleyball, it also operates an archery branch. The archery branch participates in competitions under the name of İVK Archery. Nüket Yolaç is the president of the club, which has red, white and black colors.

== Men's volleyball team ==
The club's men's volleyball team competed in the Istanbul Senior Men's League between 2010 and 2015. Since the 2015–2016 season, it has started to compete in the Regional League, which is the upper league of the Istanbul Senior Men's League. In the Regional League in the 2016-2017 and 2018–2019 seasons, it was promoted to the 2nd League of Turkey as the Istanbul champion and participated in the finals. It finished second both seasons.

=== 2010-2015 seasons ===
Although it started shortly after its establishment, it formed the A Men's team and completed the 2010–2011 season, the first season in which it joined the Big Men League, ranking 5th among 18 teams.

Completing the group stage in the 2011–2012 season in the first two places, the club faced the Ataşehir Tennis Club in the last game of the league. Although he was ahead 2-0 by winning 23, it lost its medal chances when they lost the 3rd and 4th sets 16–25, 20–25. Losing 15–9 in the 5th set, the team lost 3-2 from the last game and finished the 2011–2012 season in Istanbul in 4th place of 19 teams.

In the 2012–2013 season, Istanbul Volleyball, which faced the leader Büyükdere in the last match of the Istanbul Senior Men's final group, took the first set 25-13 and took the lead 1–0. In the 4th set, it lost the set it had led for a long time, 23-25 and lost 3–1, thus completing the final group with 4 wins and 3 defeats with 12 points, İVK came 4th in Istanbul in the Big Men League, of 17 teams.

In the 2013–2014 season, after the group stage, he finished 4th in the final group where 10 teams competed, and the 5th in the first round of the Play-Off, the Olimpia 2023 team with the results of 3-0 and 3-0 and reached the semi-finals in the series. Matching with Titan Academy, Istanbul Volleyball lost the first match 3–2, scoring 5 matches. In the second match, the club lost 3–1 to its opponent, Istanbul became the right to play the match for the third place. He finished the league he participated in as 4th in Istanbul.

Istanbul Volleyball, which won 10 wins in 10 matches in the group in the Big Men League in the 2014–2015 season and won the final group and won the first match of the final group, on April 15, before the Beyogluspor match, with a sufficient number of athletes and the team captain, the decision of the board of directors after it was conveyed to the club by our team captain. has decided to withdraw from the league in the rest of the league. Before the match, this notification was made by his opponent Beyoğluspor and the match was canceled.

=== 2015-2016 season ===
In the 2015–2016 season, in which it competed in the regional league for the first time, the club separated its ways with all the players who played in the team in the previous season and formed a new team by making 12 transfers. Being the youngest team of the Istanbul group with an average age of 19.6, the club played its first match against Sultangazi Olimpik, the champion of the previous season. He lost the first set 22–19, lost to his opponent 23–25, and won the second set 25–15, but lost the third set 19–25, the fourth set 16–25, and lost the match 3–1 in the other matches in the league, Arnavutköy Belediyesi, İbrahim Turhan Sports Club and Haydarpaşa High School teams 3-0 and finished the season as the 2nd due to the defeat in the first match due to the league being played in a single period, and completed the season by failing to go to the finals only because the champion made it to the finals.

=== 2016-2017 season ===
Failing to achieve the desired success in its first season in the regional league, the club started the season with 7 transfers.

Competing in the Istanbul Anatolian Side Group, Istanbul Volleyball faced the Haydarpaşa team on the first day. The team, which won the match 3–0 with the sets of 25–17, 25-21 and 25–21, finished the first day as the leader. The team that faced Pendik Çınarderespor, who was in the last place on the last day of the group, won 26-24 despite having difficulty in the first set, despite the difficulty of securing the finals. He won -13 and left the field with a 3–0 victory and collected 9 points without any set in all the matches he played, and earned the right to participate in the Finals as the champion of Istanbul.

In the finals held in Yalova on 03-5 March, İVK faced the champion of the South Marmara group Gemlik Basketball on the first day, leaving the match with a 3–0 defeat despite the very close set results and took the first defeat of the season. On the last day of the tournament, Istanbul Volleyball, which played against Istanbul European Side Champion Adakent in the Istanbul derby, left the match with a 3–1 victory and finished the Regional League in the second place with 5 points.

After the matches in which the top players of the group rose to the 2nd rank, Istanbul Volleyball won the right to be the first team to be invited if there is a team that does not participate in the league or is missing. Thus, the club established in 2010 achieved a Turkish degree in volleyball for the first time.

=== 2017-2018 season ===
Due to the fact that the dates of the matches in the Regional Men's League, which he participated for the 3rd time, were very bad and we struggled with the missing squad, the club performed far from the previous season's Istanbul Championship and Turkey second place, and did not qualify for the finals in Istanbul in the 2017–2018 season.

=== 2018-2019 season ===
Istanbul Volleyball, which was 3rd in the previous Istanbul and could not achieve the success it wanted by failing to qualify for the final group, met Pendik Çınarspor at Bahçelievler Sports Hall, despite having two Anatolian Side teams in their first match with their 11 new transfers and changing technical staff. The İVK, which fell 2–0 in the match with sets of 16-25 and 22–25, put its weight on the game as of the third set and brought the situation to 2–2 with the sets of 25-18 and 25–10. the winner İVK came from behind 2-0 from the field and won 3-2 and won 2 points. The second match of the group will be held in Kocaeli, beating Haydarpaşa High School team with sets of 26–24,25-23 and 25-15 3-0 and in the last match against Istanbul Sanatspor with sets of 25–10,25-9 and 25–12. Turkey won the 2nd League Promotion Final matches.

Istanbul Volleyball Club, which won all the matches it played in Istanbul this season and gained the right to stay in the finals undefeated, took part in the Kocaeli group with Istanbul Yeniköy and Tekirdağ Karacaklavuz. Tekirdağ representative did not take the field in both Istanbul Volleyball and Yeniköy matches and finished the tournament in last place.

In the final match of Kocaeli Hasan Gemici Sports Hall, Istanbul Volleyball played against Yeniköy, the other representative of Istanbul, in this match with a squad missing from two players from the squad they played in Istanbul. moved forward. Against Yeniköy, who won the second set 25–21, İVK started very well in the last set and got ahead 14–9, but could not maintain its superiority, lost the set 20-25 and lost the match and missed the championship.

=== 2019-2020 season ===
Istanbul Volleyball, who had to compete with three missing players in the first match of the league, lost the first set and the second set 26–24 against Çengelköyspor, which was leading until the end of the set, and lost the third set 25–20 in the fourth set and lost 3–1 in the fourth set. In the other matches of the group, the team competed with the full team in the second match, Pendik Volleyball with sets 25–12, 25–16, 25–11, in the third match Süreyyapaşa team with sets 25–9, 25–11, 25-14 and in the fourth match. He managed to beat Haydarpaşa High School with the sets of 25–17, 25–20, 25-23 3–0.

Despite the fact that Haydarpaşa and Çengelköy played 3–2, the club remained second behind Çengelköy on average, due to the unlucky defeat of the only team in the first match and did not win the right to participate in the Turkey 2nd League Promotion Final matches to be held in Bursa as the 2nd in Istanbul.

=== 2020-2021 season ===
The Regional League, which was organized under difficult conditions due to the pandemic conditions, started on June 10 after the 10-day preparation period was given after the bans were lifted on June 1.

In the men's league, 113 teams participated in 32 groups in total, and the club was in the 7th group.

Istanbul Volleyball, which faced Gökspor in its first match, won the field 3–0 with sets of 25–17, 25-15 and 25–15. In the second match of the group, it faced Süreyyapaşa in the match 25–12, 25–10, 18-25 and 25-25. They won 3–1 with 19 sets. In the last match of the group, IVK, who faced Tuzla Gelişim, who won the group like himself in the first two days, in a kind of group final, won the match 3–0 with sets of 25–21, 25-16 and 25-19 and got the right to participate in the Regional League Finals undefeated from the group from which one team came achieved.

On 21–23 June, in Istanbul, three Istanbul and one Tekirdağ teams competed in the 2nd Division Promotion Finals, in the Marmara Region group, IVK played its first match with Tekirdağ representative Çorlu Volleyball.

Istanbul Volleyball won the match 3–0 against Çorlu Volleyball with sets of 25–18, 28-26 and 25-21 and finished the first day as the leader. In the match, they lost the other sets 19–25,17-25 and 22-25 and were defeated 3–1. In the last match of the group, IVK, which faced the North Stars, won the match 25–18, 22–25, 21–25, 26-24 and 15–10. After winning 3-2 sets, he managed to come second in the regional league for the third time after the 2016-2017 and 2018–2019 seasons.

== Beach volleyball teams ==
The Beach Volleyball Clubs League, which was organized by the Turkish Volleyball Federation in 2009 and was suspended in 2015, started to organize again in 2017, and the Istanbul Volleyball Club formed a beach volleyball team and competed in both men and women.

The TVF Beach Volleyball League, which was formed for the first time in Turkey and in the world with the participation of only clubs and which is the biggest beach volleyball club league in the world, participated in 130 teams, 67 for men and 63 for women in 2017.

=== Women's teams ===
==== 2017 season ====
İVK Beach Volleyball Women's team consisting of Mihrican Alıosman Mehmed - Betül Dinç and Damla Tilki in the Marmara Region and Beşiktaş, GMB Çamlık, Marmara Academy, Sorgunspor, UPS and Büyükdere played in double circuit at the end of the matches played by GMB Çamlık and Marmara Academy. After that, Marmara Region became the 3rd and qualified to participate in the finals to be held in Sinop.

İVK Beach Volleyball Women's team beat Beşiktaş with a 2-1 result in both competitions they played in the league, enabling them to get a final ticket in front of their strong opponent.

Istanbul Volleyball, which was in Group D, competed with GMB Çamlık, Şile Municipality and Samsun Metropolitan Municipality in the finals of the Beach Volleyball Clubs League held in Sinop between 30 June - 2 July 2017.

The team that could not take the first two places in the group finished the tournament as the ninth in Turkey.

==== 2018 season ====
The women's team, which managed to be the 3rd in the Marmara Region and the 9th in Turkey in 2017, also joined the league in 2018.

The İVK Beach Volleyball Women's Team, which consists of Betül Dinç and Damla Tilki, who played against Beşiktaş, Teşvikiye and Alternatif in a double-circuit league method in the Istanbul Group, won all the matches they played without a set and became the undefeated champion.

In the finals held at Sinop Kumkapı Beach on 20–22 July 2018, the team beat İbradı Municipality 2–0 in the first round and lost 2–0 to Keçioren Belediyesi Bağlumspor in the second round.

On the second day of the tournament, Samsun 15 July team beat 2–0 in the third round and Antalya Youth team 2–1 in the fourth round and lost to Antalya Şimşekspor in the fifth round of the day, and the İVK Beach Volleyball Women's Team finished the tournament as the 5th in Turkey.

After the Beach Volleyball Clubs League was organized in 2018, it was not organized by TVF again.

=== Men's teams ===
==== 2017 season ====
İVK Beach Volleyball men's team in the Marmara Region was in the group with Beşiktaş, Sumak Petrol Boğaziçi, Büyükdere, Sinop Poyraz and Şile Gençlik At the end of the double-circuit matches, he defeated Beşiktaş once, Sinop Poyraz and Şile Gençlik teams twice in the two competitions and finished the league in 5th place in the 5-win group and failed to make it to the finals.

==== 2018 season ====
İVK Beach Volleyball Men's Team, which failed to participate in the finals in 2017, took part in the finals in 2018.

Participating with the team consisting of Burak Balıbey and Iranian National Beach Volleyball player Behzad Haddade Kahnamouse in the Finals held at Sinop Kumkapı Beach on 20–22 July 2018, the team passed by on the first day as the first round was seeded. In the second round, the TRNC representative, Vakıflar Spor, lost 2–1 with sets of 13–21, 21–12, 13-15 and left the group with the unfortunate defeat.

On the second day of the tournament, the team beat Beşiktaş 2–1 with the sets 21–19, 20–22, 15–12 in the first match of the tournament and in the fourth round Samsun 15 July team beat 21-11 and 21-10 sets 2–0. Matched with AP Sportif who finished as champion. İVK Beach Volleyball Men's Team lost the game against AP Sportif with 16-21 and 18-21 sets and finished the tournament as the 5th in Turkey.

After the Beach Volleyball Clubs League was held in 2018, it was not organized by TVF again.

== Social responsibility ==
Istanbul Volleyball Club is an active club in the field of social responsibility apart from sports activities. The club still carries out Material Support to Village Schools and Social Responsibility activities in other subjects. Also, on June 5, 2021, World Environment Day, the new social responsibility project "Each Set of Saplings" was implemented.

=== Each Set is a Sapling Social Responsibility Project ===
Each Set is a Sapling Social Responsibility Project Certificate of donation made at the end of the 2020-2021 Season

It implemented its new social responsibility project on June 5, 2021, World Environment Day.

Within the scope of the project, one sapling will be donated for each set won in the official matches played by the volleyball teams of the club. In addition, saplings will be donated as detailed in the tournaments to be held at the provincial and Turkish level.

Each Set is a Sapling Project will start in the Regional League matches of the 2020–2021 season and will continue in the 2021–2022 season. On the club's official website, the details of the project and the situation in which saplings will be donated are announced, and there is a counter on the home page of how many saplings will be donated as of the first match.

In the 2020–2021 season, the club donated 16 saplings to be planted through OGEM, the Foundation of the General Directorate of Forestry, after 16 sets won in 6 matches played in the Regional League group and final stages.

=== Aid to village schools social responsibility project ===
The social responsibility project initiated by the club in 2014 reached the ninth village school in 2021. After the 2021 pandemic, with the start of face-to-face education of village schools, the Social Responsibility project of Material Support for Village Schools has provided the aid of 2021 to the village school Eyyübiye Bulduk Primary School, 45 km away from Şanlıurfa, through the Village School Aid Project Association.

Material supported schools
Year	Ci̇ty	Town	School name
2014	Şırnak	Cizre	Cizre Science High School
2015	Van	Gevaş	Yunus Emre Primary School
2016	Şırnak	Beytüşşebap	Aşağıdere Primary School
2017	Bingöl	Solhan	Bölge Boarding school
2019	Batman	Kozluk	Girls Primary School
2019	Diyarbakır	Ergani	Makam Dağı Anatolian High School
2020	Muş		Bağlar Köyü Bağlar Primary School
2020	Muş		Selahaddin Eyyubi Anatolian High School
2021	Şanlıurfa	Eyyubiye	Bulduk Primary School

=== Other social responsibility projects ===
Except for material support to village schools, the club has not been affected by natural disasters and accidents, etc. It comes to the fore with the help it provides in social events.

After the mining disaster in Soma in 2014, the club's volleyball team played their first official match in the BLACK jersey with the #SOMA written on it.

The club made these projects in 2020, the assistance it provided to the children of Siirt who built a volleyball court with the car tires they bought from the gas station, the pandemic was intensively provided to healthcare personnel during night shifts, to donate saplings for the forests damaged by the forest fire in Hatay, İzmir and Elazığ. He continued with his help in the earthquakes that occurred in.
