= Hancığaz =

- Neighbourhood
- Location in Turkey Hancığaz (Şanlıurfa)
- Coordinates: 37.0912°N 38.8618°E
- Country: Turkey
- Province: Şanlıurfa
- District: Eyyübiye
- Population (2022): 759
- Time zone: UTC+3 (TRT)

Hancığaz is a neighbourhood of the municipality and district of Eyyübiye, Şanlıurfa Province, Turkey. Its population is 759 (2022). The village is the site of an 8-meter-tall archaeological mound where a survey found Chalcolithic and Byzantine-era remains.
