= Örencik, Şanlıurfa =

Örencik Xirabreşk
- Neighbourhood
- Location in Turkey Örencik (Şanlıurfa)
- Coordinates: 37°12′46″N 38°53′55″E
- Country: Turkey
- Province: Şanlıurfa
- District: Haliliye
- Population (2022): 1,924
- Time zone: UTC+3 (TRT)

Örencik (Karaharabe in 1925, Kurdish: Xirabreşk) is a neighbourhood of the municipality and district of Haliliye, Şanlıurfa Province, Turkey. Its population is 1,924 (2022).

== See also ==
- Göbekli Tepe
