= Ulubağ, Şanlıurfa =

Ulubağ
- Neighbourhood
- Location in Turkey Ulubağ (Şanlıurfa)
- Coordinates: 37.163°N 38.882°E
- Country: Turkey
- Province: Şanlıurfa
- District: Haliliye
- Population (2022): 2,170
- Time zone: UTC+3 (TRT)

Ulubağ is a neighbourhood of the municipality and district of Haliliye, Şanlıurfa Province, Turkey. Its population is 2,170 (2022). The cemetery area in the north side of the village exists on top of an archaeological mound measuring 60 m in diameter and 3 m in height. An archaeological survey in 1963 encountered artifacts from the Chalcolithic (Halaf and Ubaid periods), early Bronze Age, and Roman and Byzantine periods.
