= Shabakhtan =

Shabakhtān was the medieval Arabic name of a region east of ar-Ruha and Harran, consisting of the Tektek Dağ hills as well as the area around Viranşehir. It is mentioned roughly from the time of the Crusades until the end of the 13th century, when much of the region's population probably left. It had several fortified strongholds with dependent fiefs (‘amal, plural a‘māl). Of these, the most frequently mentioned was Jumlayn, which is the present-day site known as Çimdine Kalesi in the eastern Tektek Dağ. Other sites included Tall Mawzan, al-Qurādī, and al-Muwazzar. T.A. Sinclair identified Tall Mawzan with present-day Viranşehir. Al-Quradi may have been the fort at Sumatar; less likely possibilities are Şuayp Şehir and Qal'ah Choban. Al-Muwazzar (or al-Muwaddar) may also have been at Sumatar. Further north, Siverek was not part of Shabakhtan.

The Tektek Dağ region was likely a stronghold of the "pseudo-Sabians" (i.e. the moon- and planet-worshipping pagan religion that had its center in Harran) and may have had a sizeable population of them as late as the 13th century. Tall Mawzan, on the other hand, seems to have been mostly Christian; it was the seat of a Syrian Orthodox bishop and was probably outside the area inhabited by the pseudo-Sabians.

Shabakhtan changed hands often during the 12th and 13th centuries when sources mention it. Some or all of it had been part of the short-lived County of Edessa, but by 1144 at the latest it had come under Imad ad-Din Zangi. After he died, Shabakhtan was taken over by the Artuqids of Amid and then their relatives the Artuqids of Mardin. It was then ruled by several different Ayyubid princes, then by the Khwarazmshahs and the Mongols, and finally by the Artuqids again at the end of the 13th century.
