= Külaflı, Karaköprü =

Külaflı
- Neighbourhood
- Location in Turkey Külaflı (Şanlıurfa)
- Coordinates: 37°22′N 38°52′E
- Country: Turkey
- Province: Şanlıurfa
- District: Karaköprü
- Population (2022): 169
- Time zone: UTC+3 (TRT)

Külaflı is a neighbourhood of the municipality and district of Karaköprü, Şanlıurfa Province, Turkey. Its population is 169 (2022). Its distance to the city center of Şanlıurfa is 33 km.

== Demography ==
Historical population
Year	Pop.	±% p.a.
2007	155	—
2012	172	+2.10%
2017	179	+0.80%
2022	169	−1.14%
Source: TÜIK (2007-2022)
