= Gölpınar, Şanlıurfa =

Gölpınar
- Neighbourhood
- Location in Turkey Gölpınar (Şanlıurfa)
- Coordinates: 37.2857°N 38.8265°E
- Country: Turkey
- Province: Şanlıurfa
- District: Karaköprü
- Population (2022): 670
- Time zone: UTC+3 (TRT)

Gölpınar is a neighbourhood of the municipality and district of Karaköprü, Şanlıurfa Province, Turkey. Its population is 670 (2022). It is located about 15 km (9.3 mi) north of Urfa. It is located just south of the road to Kabahaydar, 2 km (1.2 mi) east of the road's intersection with the main Urfa-Siverek highway. It lies on a plain that stretches east toward Kabahaydar, between the Akziyaret Tepe hill to the north and the forested hills called Atatürk Ormanı (part of Germuş Dağ) to the south. There is a spring in the east of the village.

== Archaeology ==
The village sits on top of a small archaeological mound about 250 m in diameter and 10 m in height. In some places, erosion from the spring has revealed basalt architectural fragments. Old relief fragments are also visible in the walls of some houses. Two ancient stone artifacts were found at Gölpınar: one is a broken stele, 116 cm tall and 42 cm wide, is now kept at the Şanlıurfa Museum; the other is an orthostat measuring 116x75x20 cm. F. Kulakoğlu dated the stele to approximately the 8th century BCE and the orthostat to about the late 10th century BCE. The stele depicts a male figure riding on a bull; the upper part of the male figure is missing. He is wearing a short skirt with a wide belt and traditional Hittite shoes with upturned tips. Attached to his belt is a sword. The orthostat depicts a male figure riding a deer, also in a Hittite-like style with the head and lower body in profile but the torso shown head-on. In this case, his head is missing except for his beard. He is wearing a short-sleeved robe with a wide belt; attached to the belt is a short sword with a crescent-shaped hilt. He is holding a bow in his left hand and two arrows in his right. This imagery is associated with a god who was protector of the countryside.
