= Göktepe, Şanlıurfa =

Göktepe
- Neighbourhood
- Location within Turkey Location within Şanlıurfa
- Coordinates: 37.1794°N 38.9112°E
- Country: Turkey
- Province: Şanlıurfa
- District: Haliliye
- Population (2022): 833
- Time zone: UTC+3 (TRT)

Göktepe is a neighbourhood of the municipality and district of Haliliye, Şanlıurfa Province, Turkey. Its population is 833 (2022). It is located by the Urfa-Viranşehir highway and the Mucid Dere stream. There is an archaeological mound located north of the village, measuring 80 m in diameter and 20 m in height. An archaeological survey in 1963 encountered Early and Middle Bronze Age as well as Roman and Byzantine artifacts.

The neighbourhood is populated by Arabs of the Bini icil (Benî icl) tribe
