= Eyyübiye =

- District and municipality
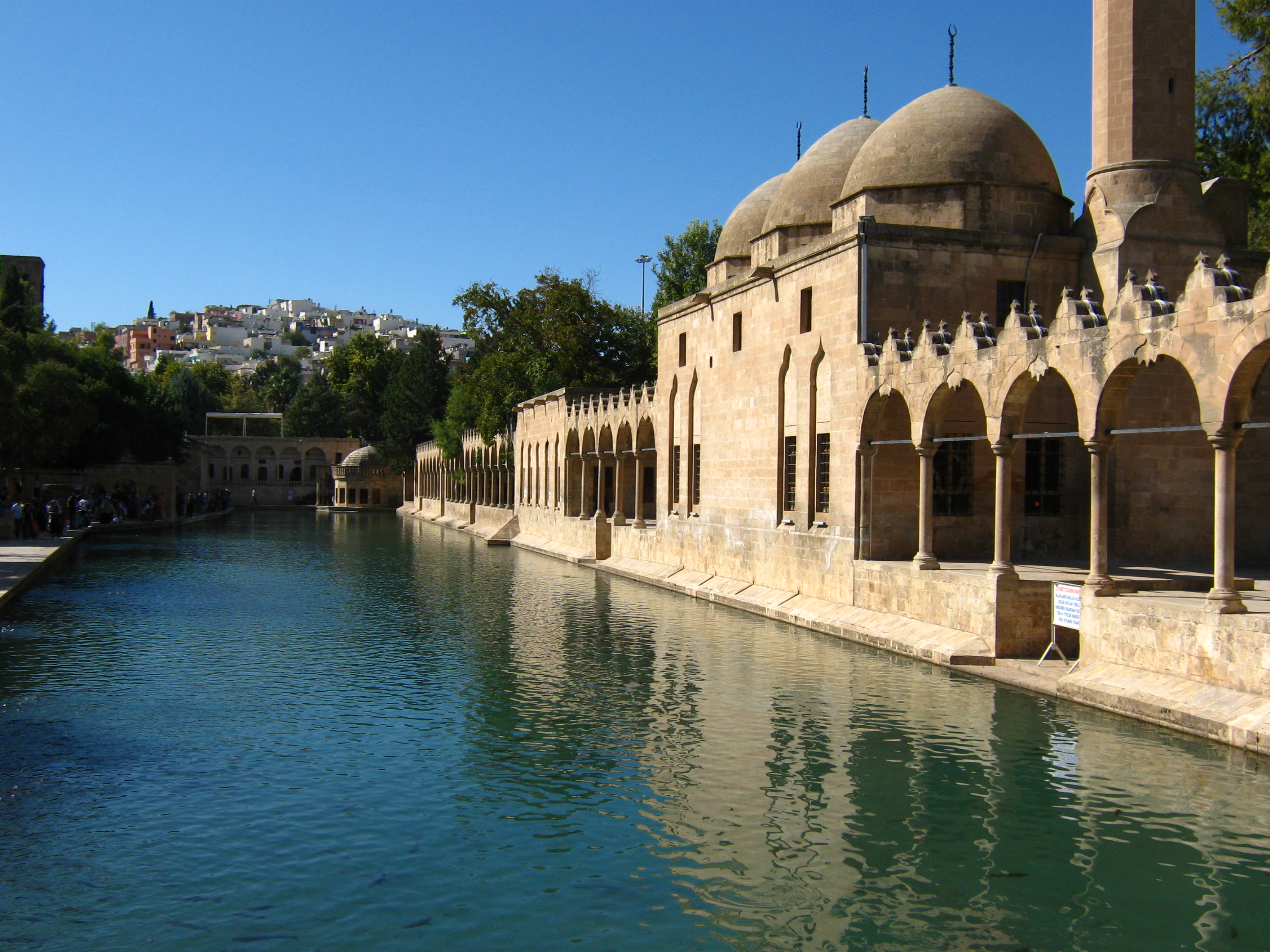
- Balıklıgöl is located in the district

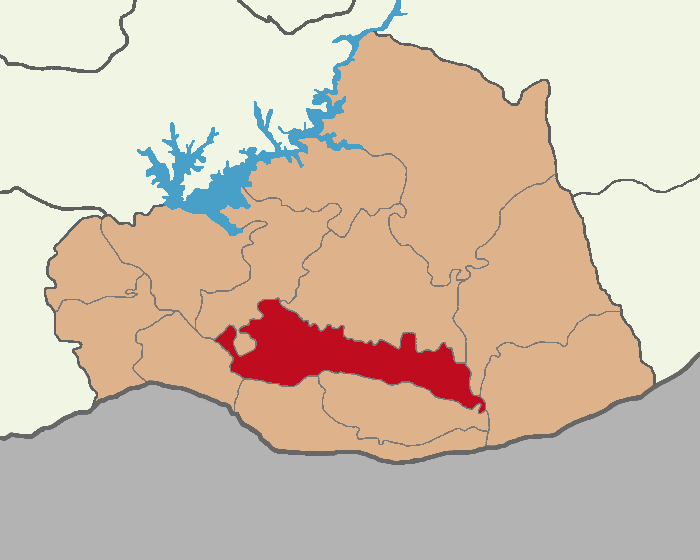
- Map showing Eyyübiye District in Şanlıurfa Province

- Location within Turkey Location within Şanlıurfa
- Coordinates: 37°07′58″N 38°47′55″E
- Country: Turkey
- Province: Şanlıurfa

Government
  - Mayor: Mehmet Kuş (AKP)
- Area: 1,626 km^{2} (628 sq mi)
- Population (2022): 391,795
  - Density: 241.0/km^{2} (624.1/sq mi)
- Time zone: UTC+3 (TRT)
- Area code: 0414
- Website: www.eyyubiye.bel.tr

Eyyübiye is a municipality and district of Şanlıurfa Province, Turkey. Its area is 1,626 km^{2}, and its population is 391,795 (2022). The district Eyyübiye was created at the 2013 reorganisation from part of the former central district of Şanlıurfa Province, along with the new districts Haliliye and Karaköprü. It covers the central and southern part of the agglomeration of Şanlıurfa and the adjacent countryside. In the local elections of 31 March 2019, Mehmet Kuş (AKP) was elected mayor. Mustafa Hamit Kıyıcı is the appointed district governor.

== Demography ==
A 2018 survey on first language conducted by the municipality showed that 56.8% of the district spoke Kurdish as their first language, followed by Arabic at 38.9% and Turkish at 4.3%.

Historical population
Year	Pop.	±% p.a.
2013	360,509	—
2017	375,967	+1.06%
2022	391,795	+0.83%
Source: TÜIK (2013-2022)

== Composition ==
There are 163 neighbourhoods in Eyyübiye District:

- 15 Temmuz
- Abdurrahmandede
- Açmalı
- Akabe
- Akçamesçit
- Akdilek
- Akmağara
- Akmeşhet
- Akören
- Akşemsettin
- Alkanlı
- Altın
- Altınbaşak
- Altıntepe
- Ambartepe
- Apalı
- Aşağıhemedan
- Aşağıkoçlu
- Aşağıyazıcı
- Asya
- Atlıkonak
- Ayrancı
- Bağış
- Bakırtaş
- Bakışlar
- Banarlı
- Başgök
- Başgöze
- Başören
- Batıkent
- Bayraklı
- Beşat
- Beyazyaprak
- Beykapısı
- Bıçakçılı
- Bildim
- Bozhöyük
- Buhara
- Bulduk
- Büyükdüzlük
- Büyükhan
- Büyükhancağız
- Büyükotluca
- Çalışkanlar
- Camikebir
- Çamurlu
- Dedeosman
- Dernek
- Dilimli
- Direkli
- Dolutepe
- Duruca
- Eyyubiye
- Eyyüpkent
- Eyyüpnebi
- Gelincik
- Göldere
- Göller
- Görenler
- Gözeller
- Gümüşkuşak
- Gümüşören
- Günbalı
- Güneş
- Güngören
- Güzelkuyu
- Hacıbayram
- Hacılar
- Haleplibahçe
- Hamzababa
- Hancığaz
- Hayatiharrani
- Hekimdede
- Horozköy
- İkizce
- Kadıkendi
- Kadıoğlu
- Kapköy
- Kaplanköy
- Karaali
- Karahisar
- Karakoyunlu
- Karaman
- Keberli
- Keçikıran
- Kendirci
- Keserdede
- Keskin
- Kınalı
- Kırçiçeği
- Kırkmağara
- Kızılkuyu
- Koçören
- Köprülük
- Kubacık
- Küçük Çamurlu
- Küçükdüzlük
- Küçükhan
- Külünçe
- Küpeli
- Kurtuluş
- Kurucuk
- Mance
- Mihraplı
- Muradiye
- Mutlukaya
- Nadire
- Olgunlar
- Olukyanı
- Onikiler
- Örenli
- Ortahemedan
- Osmanlı
- Ovabeyli
- Ozanlar
- Özlü
- Payamlı
- Pınarbaşı
- Ruha
- Sağlık
- Şahinalan
- Şahinler
- Seksenören
- Selçuklu
- Selman
- Şıhmaksut
- Süleymanşah
- Sultantepe
- Tarlabaşı
- Taşlıca
- Tekyamaç
- Tepe
- Topdağı
- Türkmeydanı
- Turluk
- Tuzluca
- Uğurlu
- Ulak
- Ulucanlar
- Uluköy
- Umuroba
- Üzerlik
- Vergili
- Yağmurlu
- Yakubiye
- Yamaçaltı
- Yanıkçöğür
- Yardımcı
- Yaşar
- Yaykılıç
- Yediyol
- Yeni
- Yenice
- Yeşildere
- Yolbaşı
- Yolbilir
- Yukarı Koçlu
- Yukarıçaykuyu
- Yukarıhemedan
- Yukarıyazıcı
- Yusuf
- Yusufpaşa
- Zeynepköy
