= Çamurlu, Şanlıurfa =

Çamurlu
- Neighbourhood
- Location within Turkey Location within Şanlıurfa
- Coordinates: 37.0831°N 38.8744°E
- Country: Turkey
- Province: Şanlıurfa
- District: Eyyübiye
- Population (2022): 766
- Time zone: UTC+3 (TRT)

Çamurlu is a neighbourhood of the municipality and district of Eyyübiye, Şanlıurfa Province, Turkey. Its population is 766 (2022). The village is the site of Çamurlu Tepe, an archaeological mound measuring 160 m in diameter and 14 m in height. An archaeological survey conducted by N. Yardımcı found remains at Çamurlu Tepe dating from the Halaf and Ubaid periods of the Chalcolithic era, the early Bronze Age, and the Roman and Byzantine periods.

The neighborhood is populated by Arabs
