= Karaköprü =

- District and municipality
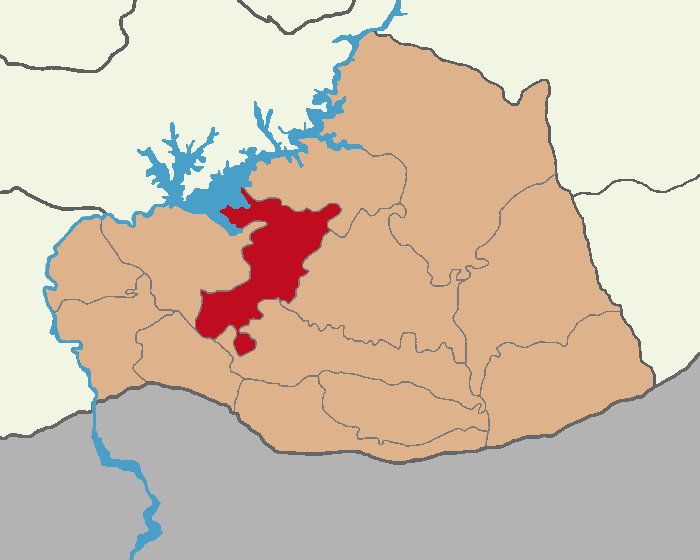
- Map showing Karaköprü District in Şanlıurfa Province

- Location in Turkey Karaköprü (Şanlıurfa)
- Coordinates: 37°11′05″N 38°47′27″E
- Country: Turkey
- Province: Şanlıurfa

Government
  - Mayor: Nihat Çiftçi (YRP)
- Area: 1,222 km^{2} (472 sq mi)
- Population (2022): 265,035
  - Density: 216.9/km^{2} (561.7/sq mi)
- Time zone: UTC+3 (TRT)
- Area code: 0414
- Website: www.karakopru.bel.tr

Karaköprü (Kurdish: Pira Reş) is a municipality and district of Şanlıurfa Province, Turkey. Its area is 1,222 km^{2}, and its population is 265,035 (2022). The district Karaköprü was created at the 2013 reorganisation from part of the former central district of Şanlıurfa Province, along with the new districts Eyyübiye and Haliliye. It covers the northern part of the agglomeration of Şanlıurfa and the adjacent countryside. Its eponymous city center is slightly north from central Urfa. In the local elections of March 2019, Metin Baydilli was elected Mayor of Karaköprü. The current Kaymakam is Yakup Kılınçoğlu.

== Composition ==
There are 100 neighbourhoods in Karaköprü District:

- Ağılcık
- Ağızhan
- Akbayır
- Akçahisar
- Akıncı
- Akpınar
- Akpıyar
- Akziyaret
- Ali Baba
- Apaydın
- Aşağıçiftlik
- Aşıkköy
- Atakent
- Ayanlar
- Bahçeli
- Başören
- Batıkent
- Bezirci
- Bölücek
- Bozköy
- Buğdayhüyük
- Büyük Alanlı
- Büyük Kargılı
- Büyükçömlekçi
- Büyükördek
- Büyüksalkım
- Çakmak
- Çamlıyayla
- Çankaya
- Cemal
- Çiftekemer
- Çıralı
- Cülmen
- Demircik
- Doğukent
- Dolunay
- Doyumlu
- Düğer
- Ergünköy
- Esemkulu
- Esentepe
- Estafirullah
- Gazibey
- Geçitköy
- Gelibolu
- Göbekli
- Gölgen
- Gölpınar
- Güllübağ
- Günışık
- Hamurkesen
- Horzum
- Hüyüklü
- İlhan
- İsaören
- Karataş
- Karşıyaka
- Kasımkuyu
- Kırkpınar
- Kızılburç
- Kızlar
- Köksüren
- Korukezen
- Küçükalanlı
- Küçüktülmen
- Külaflı
- Kuşluca
- Kuyucak
- Lüleci
- Maşuk
- Mehmetçik
- Millisaray
- Mustafacık
- Narlıkuyu
- Öğütçü
- Örcünlü
- Otlukalan
- Överler
- Özgedik
- Pınarbaşı
- Şahin
- Sakça
- Sancak
- Sarım
- Şeker
- Şenevler
- Şeyhzeliha
- Seyrantepe
- Tatburcu
- Tülmen
- Türkmen
- Uzuncuk
- Yarımtepe
- Yaylacık
- Yedikuyu
- Yemişli
- Yığınak
- Yoğunburç
- Yukarıkoşma
- Yusufkuyu
