= Bozova =

- District and municipality
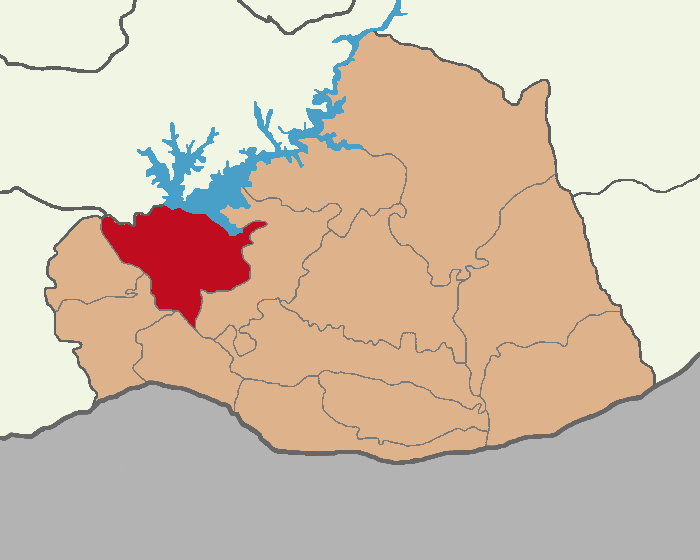
- Map showing Bozova District in Şanlıurfa Province

- Location within Turkey Location within Şanlıurfa
- Coordinates: 37°21′46″N 38°31′32″E
- Country: Turkey
- Province: Şanlıurfa

Government
  - Mayor: Suphi Aksoy (AKP)
- Area: 1,329 km^{2} (513 sq mi)
- Population (2022): 52,680
  - Density: 39.64/km^{2} (102.7/sq mi)
- Time zone: UTC+3 (TRT)
- Area code: 0414
- Website: www.bozova.bel.tr

Bozova (Ottoman Turkish: بوزاووه Kurdish: Hewenge) is a municipality and district of Şanlıurfa Province, Turkey. Its area is 1,329 km^{2}, and its population is 52,680 (2022). It is 38 km from the city of Şanlıurfa.

== Composition ==
There are 88 neighbourhoods in Bozova District:

- 75.Yıl
- Akmağara
- Altınlı
- Argıncık
- Arıkök
- Arpalı
- Avlak
- Aylan
- Bağlıca
- Baltaş
- Binekli
- Biris
- Boztepe
- Budaklı
- Bulancak
- Büyükhan
- Çakmaklı
- Çatak
- Cavsak
- Deliler
- Denizbacı
- Dutluca
- Dutluk
- Eskin
- Fevzi Çakmak
- Gerdek
- Gökören
- Gölbaşı
- Göynik
- Gözenek
- Hacıköy
- Hacılar
- Hisarlar
- İkiz
- İncirli
- Kabacık
- Karaca
- Karacaören
- Karakaş
- Karapınar
- Kargılı
- Kepirce
- Kesmetaş
- Kevik
- Kılçık
- Kılıçören
- Killik
- Kındırali
- Kırağılı
- Kırmızıpınar
- Kızlar
- Koçhisar
- Koçveran
- Konuksever
- Köseşahin
- Küçük Hisarlar
- Küpeli
- Maşuk
- Mülkören
- Narsait
- Norçin
- Örgülü
- Ortaören
- Ortatepe
- Özgören
- Pirhalil
- Sağırlı
- Saluc
- Şanlıavşar
- Şeyhler
- Seyitören
- Sığırcık
- Sızan
- Soğukkuyu
- Söğütlü
- Taşan
- Tatarhüyük
- Tekdiş
- Tozluca
- Tunalı
- Türkmenören
- Üçdirek
- Uzunburç
- Yalıntaş
- Yaslıca
- Yavuz Selim
- Yaylak
- Yeşilova
- Zivanlı
