= Konuklu, Şanlıurfa =

Konuklu
- Neighbourhood
- Location in Turkey Konuklu (Şanlıurfa)
- Coordinates: 37.1263°N 38.8486°E
- Country: Turkey
- Province: Şanlıurfa
- District: Haliliye
- Population (2022): 7,813
- Time zone: UTC+3 (TRT)

Konuklu is a neighbourhood of the municipality and district of Haliliye, Şanlıurfa Province, Turkey. Its population is 7,813 (2022). Before the 2013 reorganisation, it was a town (belde).

It is the site of Kazane Höyük, an archaeological site that covers 40 hectares, making it the largest in the Southeastern Anatolia Region. The site dates to the Halaf and Ubaid periods of the Chalcolithic era, the early Bronze Age, and the Iron Age. Excavation started in 1992 and as of 2008 an area of about 400 square meters has been excavated. Remains of houses from the late Chalcolithic were found with mud brick, adobe, and pisé walls and plastered floors. According to excavator Patricia Wattenmaker, the settlement at Kazane Höyük was a large town surrounded by thick city walls around 1800 BCE.
