= Haliliye =

- District and municipality
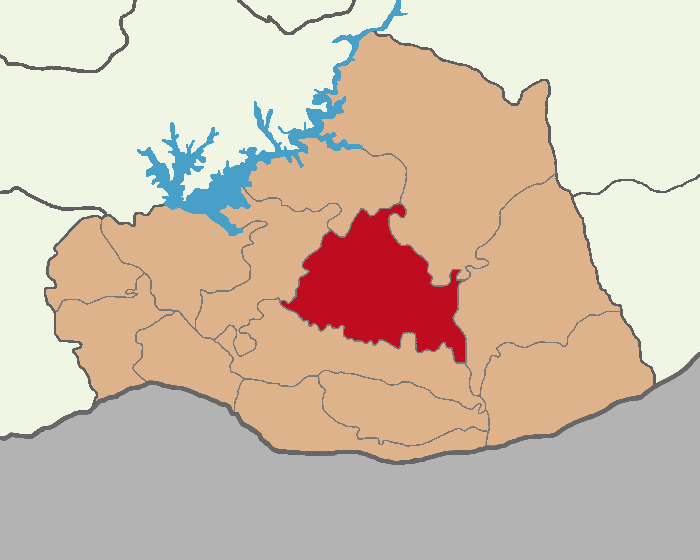
- Map showing Haliliye District in Şanlıurfa Province

- Location in Turkey Haliliye (Şanlıurfa)
- Coordinates: 37°09′46″N 38°49′24″E
- Country: Turkey
- Province: Şanlıurfa

Government
  - Mayor: Mehmet Canpolat (AKP)
- Area: 1,924 km^{2} (743 sq mi)
- Population (2022): 396,656
  - Density: 206.2/km^{2} (534.0/sq mi)
- Time zone: UTC+3 (TRT)
- Area code: 0414
- Website: www.haliliye.bel.tr

Haliliye (Kurdish: Xelîlî) is a municipality and district of Şanlıurfa Province, Turkey. Its area is 1,924 km^{2}, and its population is 396,656 (2022). The district Haliliye was created at the 2013 reorganisation from part of the former central district of Şanlıurfa Province, along with the new districts Eyyübiye and Karaköprü. It covers the eastern part of the agglomeration of Şanlıurfa and the adjacent countryside. The name "Haliliye" refers to Halil İbrahim, the Muslim pronunciation of Abraham whose tomb is believed to be in Şanlıurfa. In the local elections of 31 March 2019, Mehmet Canpolat from the Justice and Development Party (AKP) was elected mayor. As Kaymakam Serap Özmen Çetin was appointed.

The village Dağeteği used to be called Garmuç. It had 5,000 Armenian inhabitants before the Armenian genocide.

== Composition ==
There are 170 neighbourhoods in Haliliye District:

- Acaryurt
- Açıkyazı
- Ahmetyesevi
- Akçalı
- Akdoğan
- Akpınar
- Aktaş
- Altındamla
- Altıntepe
- Anaz
- Aşağı Içkara
- Aşağıakören
- Aşağıkoymat
- Aşağıvarlıca
- Aslanlı
- Asri
- Atatürk
- Ayazca
- Bağlar
- Bağlarbaşı
- Bahçelievler
- Bakımlı
- Balkatan
- Ballıca
- Bamyasuyu
- Boncuk
- Boydere
- Büyük Mirdesi
- Çamlıdere
- Çanakçı
- Çatallı
- Çekçek
- Cengiztopel
- Çiçekli
- Çiçektepesi
- Çukurdoruç
- Dağeteği
- Dağyanı
- Dalbaşı
- Denizci
- Derinkuyu
- Derman
- Devteşti
- Dikme
- Diktaş
- Diphisar
- Eğerkıran
- Emirler
- Ernebi
- Ertuğrulgazi
- Esenyayla
- Göktepe
- Güçlü
- Gülveren
- Gümüştaş
- Gürpınar
- Güvenli
- Güzelköy
- Güzelyurt
- Halime
- Hamidiye
- Havşanlı
- Hızmalı
- İbrik
- İkiağız
- İmambakır
- İnci
- İncirağacı
- İncirli
- İpekyol
- İrice
- Kahraman
- Kalecik
- Kalınbayat
- Kanatlı
- Kanberiye
- Kanoğlu
- Kapaklı
- Karatepe
- Kargalı
- Karpuzlu
- Karşıyaka
- Kavakbaşı
- Kayalı
- Kaygılı
- Kaynaklı
- Keçili
- Kengerli
- Kepez
- Kepirli
- Keremli
- Kesme
- Kısas
- Kızılpınar
- Koçak
- Konaç
- Konak
- Konuklu
- Körkuyu
- Kösecik
- Köseköy
- Küçüksenemağara
- Mağaracık
- Mamuca
- Mehmetcik
- Mil
- Mimarsinan
- Mutluca
- Nokta
- Oğulbey
- Örencik
- Ortaören
- Osmanbey
- Osmangazi
- Parmakkapı
- Paşabağı
- Payamlı
- Perşembe
- Refahiye
- Şairnabi
- Şairşevket
- Sancaktar
- Sarışeyh
- Sarıtaş
- Sarpdere
- Sefalı
- Şehitlik
- Selahaddinieyyubi
- Sendebelen
- Şenocak
- Şeyhçoban
- Seyrantepe
- Sırrın
- Süleymaniye
- Sultanfatih
- Sumaklı
- Susuz
- Taşlıca
- Tekerli
- Tepedibi
- Tepeköy
- Terzi
- Topraklı
- Üçgöze
- Üçkonak
- Üçkuyu
- Ulubağ
- Ulubatlı
- Uluhan
- Umut
- Üzümkara
- Uzunköy
- Veyselkarani
- Yarımsu
- Yavuzselim
- Yazılıkavak
- Yedikuyu
- Yenice
- Yeniköy
- Yenişehir
- Yenisu
- Yeroluk
- Yeşildirek
- Yeşilköy
- Yeşiltepe
- Yeşilyurt
- Yıldız
- Yolyazı
- Yukarıakören
- Yukarıkoymat
- Yenimahalle

== Notable natives ==
- Abdulsamet Ocakoğlu (born 2000), world and European champion para arm wrestler.
