= Sumatar Harabesi =

- Location of Sumatar Harabesi
- Coordinates: 37°0′N 38°58′E
- Country: Turkey
- Region: Southeast Anatolia
- Province: Şanlıurfa
- Time zone: UTC+3 (TRT)

Sumatar Harabesi (also, Sumatar Ruins or simply, Sumatar or Soğmatar) was an ancient watering place for semi-nomadic peoples located in the Tektek Mountains, 60 kilometers (37 mi) southeast of Urfa (Edessa, Mesopotamia) and 40 kilometers (25 mi) northeast of Harran, in modern-day Turkey. A now deserted oasis, it consists of a set of ruins and tombs situated around a central mount of rock 50 meters (160 ft) in height and width.

A series of Syriac inscriptions dating to the 2nd and 3rd centuries CE have been found at the site. Inscriptions that refer to the "Lord of the gods," are thought to be references to the moon god Sin. In nearby Edessa, worship of Sin, who was also the main deity in Harran, extended back to the beginning of the 1st millennium BCE, and continued until some time in the 4th century CE when solar worship began to predominate.

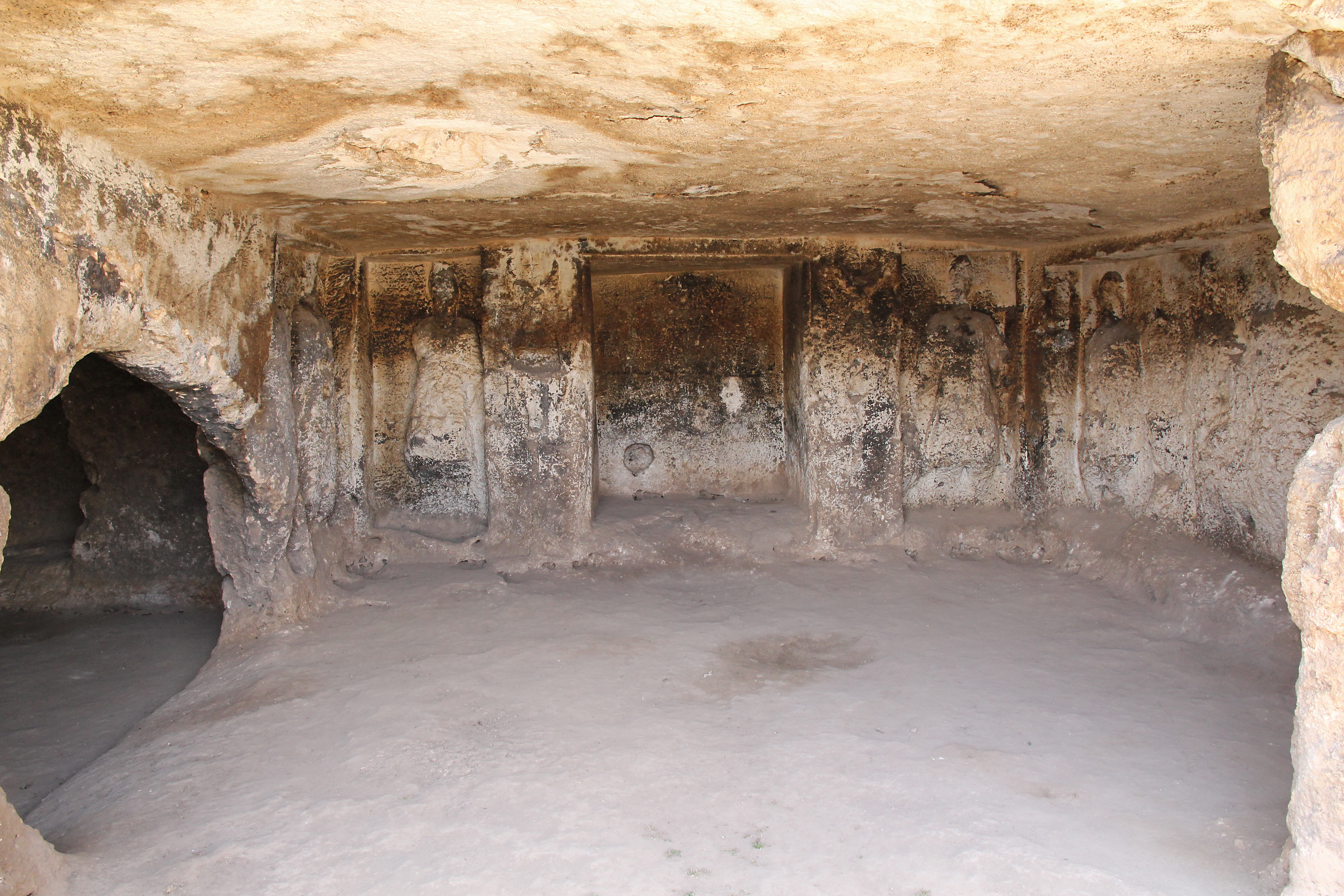
Part of interior of Pognon's cave

Sumatar is also described as, "the seat of the governors of 'Arab," who derived their authority from Sin. Five of the Syriac inscriptions at Sumatar Harabesi refer to "the 'Arab", only one of which has been dated (circa 165 CE). Jan Rëtso writes that these inscriptions confirm the presence of Arabs in the area around Edessa, as mentioned twice in the writings of Pliny the Elder. The governors of the 'Arab were thought to be members of the Edessene royal family, or closely related to them, appointed by Sin to look after the "blessed mountain" that served as his sanctuary. There, these religio-political officials had altars and baetyls erected in the god's honour. A large cave at Sumatar, known as Pognon's cave, is decorated with a horned pillar, Sin's symbol.

== See also ==
- Kingdom of Hatra

== Bibliography ==
- Bowman, Alan K.; Garnsey, Peter; Cameron, Averil (2005). The Cambridge Ancient History: The Crisis of Empire, A.D. 193-337 (2nd, illustrated, revised ed.). Cambridge University Press. ISBN 9780521301992.
- Drijvers, H. J. W.; Healey, John F. (1999). The old Syriac inscriptions of Edessa and Osrhoene: texts, translations, and commentary - Volume 42 of Handbuch der Orientalistik (Illustrated ed.). BRILL. ISBN 9789004112841.
- Lipiński, Edward (2000). The Aramaeans: their ancient history, culture, religion - Volume 100 of Orientalia Lovaniensia analecta (Illustrated ed.). Peeters Publishers. ISBN 9789042908598.
- Lipiński, Edward (1994). Studies in Aramaic inscriptions and onomastics, Volume 2. Peeters Publishers. ISBN 9789068316100.
- Retsö, Jan (2003). The Arabs in antiquity: their history from the Assyrians to the Umayyads - Volume 91 of Nordic Institute of Asian Studies monograph series (Illustrated ed.). Routledge. ISBN 9780700716791.
- Segal, J. B. (2005). Edessa: The Blessed City (2nd ed.). Gorgias Press LLC. ISBN 9781593331931.
- Teixidor, Javier (1979). The pantheon of Palmyra: Volume 79 of Education and Society in the Middle Ages and Renaissance (Illustrated ed.). Brill Archive. ISBN 9789004059870.
