= Muş Alparslan University =

Public university in Muş, Turkey

- Established: 2007
- Rector: Prof. Dr. Mustafa Alican
- Location: Güzeltepe village, Muş, Turkey; 38.7712°N 41.4247°E
- Language of Education: Turkish
- Colors: Red and White
- Website: Official website

Muş Alparslan University is a university located in Muş, Turkey. It was established in 2007.

== History ==
Muş Alparslan University was established on May 29, 2007.

== Transportation ==
The university campus is located in Güzeltepe village on the 7th kilometer of Muş-Diyarbakır road. Transportation is carried out by public transportation from within the city.

== Foreign relations ==
Muş University is a member of the Caucasus University Association.
