= Çamurlu oil field =

Oil field in southeast Turkey

Çamurlu
- Country: Turkey
- Region: South East
- Location: South East of Turkey close to the Syrian border
- Offshore/onshore: onshore
- Operator: Türkiye Petrolleri Anonim Ortaklığı

Production
- Current production of oil: 3,000 barrels per day (~1.5×10^{5} t/a)
- Estimated oil in place: 51.4 million tonnes (~ 59.9×10^{6} m^{3} or 377 million bbl)

The Camurlu Oil field, located in the South East of Turkey close to the Syrian border, has been discovered in 1975.

The producing formations are located in three separate layers:

- the shallowest one, which is about 1250 m deep, is the light-brown limestone formation of Alt Sinan. The total formation thickness is approximately 150 m including 60 m which contain a heavy viscous oil (10-12 oAPI) below the gas cap,

- under the Alt Sinan formation, a ta depth of about 1400 m, is a dolomitic formation showing local producing capacities of heavy oil (10-12 oAPI) with a high watercut: Beloka,

- the deepest layer, known as Mus formation, around 2200 m deep, in the Trias, is a gas-condensate reservoir which contains 73% CO_{2}, it is also limestone having a good producing potential.

The gas cap at the top of Alt Sinan formation covers a large area. Wells producing in the oil zone of this formation have had to be shut-in due to their low oil productivity (oil viscosity is 284 cp under reservoir condition) or to the breakthrough of gas attributed to gas coning.

Wells completed and produced in the Beloka formation were shut in as well on account of their high watercut. For this reason the development of an EOR process has been restricted to the Alt Sinan formation.

Oil production started in May 1976, with average initial rate of 100 STB/day for most wells. Production rates gradually dropped to 15-20 STB/day within 2 years with a small watercut. At the end of December 1986 the cumulative oil production was 689,546 STB.
