= Balıklıgöl =

Pool in Şanlıurfa, Turkey

Coordinates: 37°08′52″N 38°47′04″E

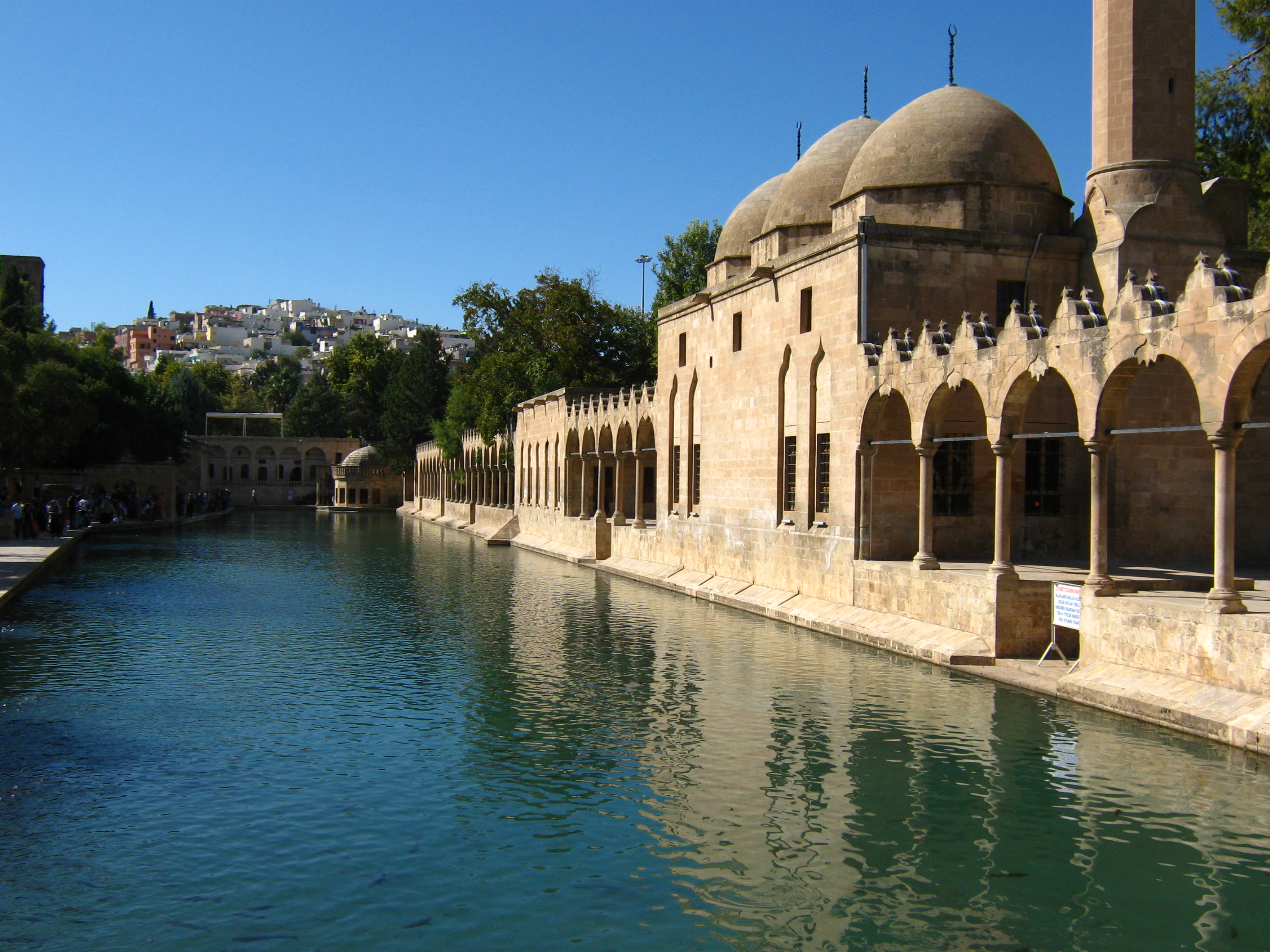
Balıklıgöl in Turkey

Balıklıgöl (or Pool of Abraham, Halil-Ür Rahman Lake), is a pool in the southwest of the city center of Şanlıurfa, Turkey known in Jewish and Islamic legends as the place where Nimrod threw Abraham into a fire. Balıklıgöl and neighbouring Aynzeliha pools are among the most visited places in Şanlıurfa.

== History ==
Balıklıgöl appears to have been a venerated site long before the time of Abraham, as a statue was found there which dates to the Pre-Pottery Neolithic period (roughly 8000 B.C.). Like the city of Urfa itself, the subsequent history of the site is uncertain until the Hellenistic period, when the city was conquered by Macedonian forces under Alexander the Great, and it was renamed Edessa by the general Seleucus I. During the Hellenistic period, Edessa was one of the holy sites of the Syrian goddess Atargatis, which also had prominent centers throughout Syria and the Levant in places such as Hierapolis and Ashkelon. In these locations as well, pools of fish were sacred locations, and people were forbidden from consuming them. While Lucian himself does not explicitly mention Edessa as a holy site for Atargatis, it is a plausible speculation given the widespread presence of sacred pools throughout the region.

In the period of Late Antiquity, the site was connected to the history of Abraham and his confrontation with Nimrod. This connection originally dates back to a first century AD Jewish haggada by Pseudo-Philo, which sketches out the basic outline of the story which would eventually have so much significance, where Nimrod, angered by Abraham's rejection of his worship of idols and construction of the Tower of Babel, attempted to burn the patriarch alive, only for him to be miraculously rescued from the flames. The story would later appear in rabbinic literature such as the Genesis Rabbah. Due to the similarity between the Hebrew word ’or (“flame, fire”) and the city Ur, later commentators saw the declaration “I am the Lord who brought you out of Ur of the Chaldees [lit: Ur Kasdim]” in Genesis 15:7 as a reference to this confrontation. Even amongst the scholars who identified Ur of the Chaldees as a location rather than an event, many still sought to connect it to the conflict between Abraham and Nimrod. While one proposed location was the ancient city of Ur in southern Mesopotamia, another was Urfa, and this latter location was favored by most of the ancient traditions. Even as late as eighteenth century, the local Jewish population claimed Urfa to be the site of this confrontation between Abraham and Nimrod.

While the majority of Jewish and subsequent Christian and Muslim commentators considered Urfa to be the birthplace of Abraham, this did not necessarily mean there was an explicit connection to Nimrod. For instance, when the late fourth century AD Christian pilgrim Egeria visited the city, she noted in particular that “there were fountains full of fish such as I never saw before, of so great size, so bright and of so good a flavour were they.” However, in her detailed description of the pool, instead of Abraham and Nimrod, she associated the site with the more recent history of King Abgar V of Osroene, who supposedly was one of the first monarchs to convert to Christianity. According to Egeria, the local bishop claimed the pool was created when the city was besieged by the Persians, who had diverted the city's water supply to their own camp. However, as soon as they had done so, “the fountains which you see in this place burst forth at once at God's bidding, and by the favour of God they remain here from that day to this.” For some early Christians then, the pool did have a miraculous origin, but it was one unrelated to Abraham.

=== Islamic mythology ===
In the Quran, there is mention of Abraham's rescue from fire after challenging his father's idolatry, and though Nimrod is not explicitly mentioned in this scene, later commentators often identified him with the unnamed opponent in the account. Regardless, the conflict between Abraham and Nimrod eventually became a prominent tradition in early Islam, though this popularity may have sparked disagreement as to where their confrontation took place. According to Caroline Janssen, there are at least four distinct Nimrods in medieval Arabic geographical texts, and several locations besides Urfa were suggested by Muslim scholars, including Kutha in Iraq and Abarkuh in Persia, where hills of ashes from the fire reportedly could still be seen. However, Urfa also became another strong contender for the site of the conflict, and the fish pool was also given a role in the story. In this telling, Abraham had been born at Urfa, and had eventually fallen in love with the daughter of Nimrod, Zeliha. Angered by this, Nimrod then cast Abraham into a massive fire, but the flames were miraculously transformed by God into the pool of water and the logs into the sacred carp. While this pool became known as the Halil-Ür Rahman Lake, the other nearby body of water, the Aynzeliha Lake, was said to be formed by Zeliha's tears after the event, and supposedly can strike whoever drinks from it blind. Other sites around the city were also connected to the story, such as a nearby cave said to be the birthplace of Abraham, and the ruins of two Roman columns on the old acropolis of the city, which were interpreted by the seventeenth century Ottoman traveler Evliya Çelebi as the remnants of an ancient war machine constructed by Nimrod to battle Abraham. Eventually, the Halil-Rahman and Rizvaniye mosques were built at the site as well to venerate the deliverance of the patriarch, replacing an earlier synagogue and church.

==== Islamic references ====
Several Islamic scholars have made statements about the pool. There is no narrative about Balıklıgöl in the Qur'an and hadith. They said that mythology was a folk superstition. Islamic scholars accepted that the pools belonged to the pagan faith. The story was produced by the public from Jewish mythology between 1900 and 1960.

== The modern site ==
Makam-ı İbrahim Mosque and cave are situated to the South East of the pools, and are also considered to be connected to the life of Abraham, being the cave where Abraham is said to have been born. Modern Balıklıgöl remains a popular site for devotees and tourists alike, with tens of thousands of visitors arriving at the pool every year. Like the earlier devotees of Atargatis, the carp are still considered to be sacred and people are not allowed to catch or eat them. However, in an interesting twist from Egeria's account of the excellent taste of the carp, Elif Batuman recounts a local legend which claims that anyone who eats one will go blind, a fate which is itself quite similar to the traditions surrounding Aynzeliha Lake and the tears of Zeliha. Instead, visitors are encouraged to feed the fish, as this is their main source of food, given the lack of suitable prey in the pool itself. Even now then, the popularity of Balıklıgöl relies heavily upon the Biblical past, which also preserves some of the alternative traditions which developed around it over its history.
