= Tektek Mountains =

Mountain range in Turkey

Coordinates: 36°57′N 39°27′E

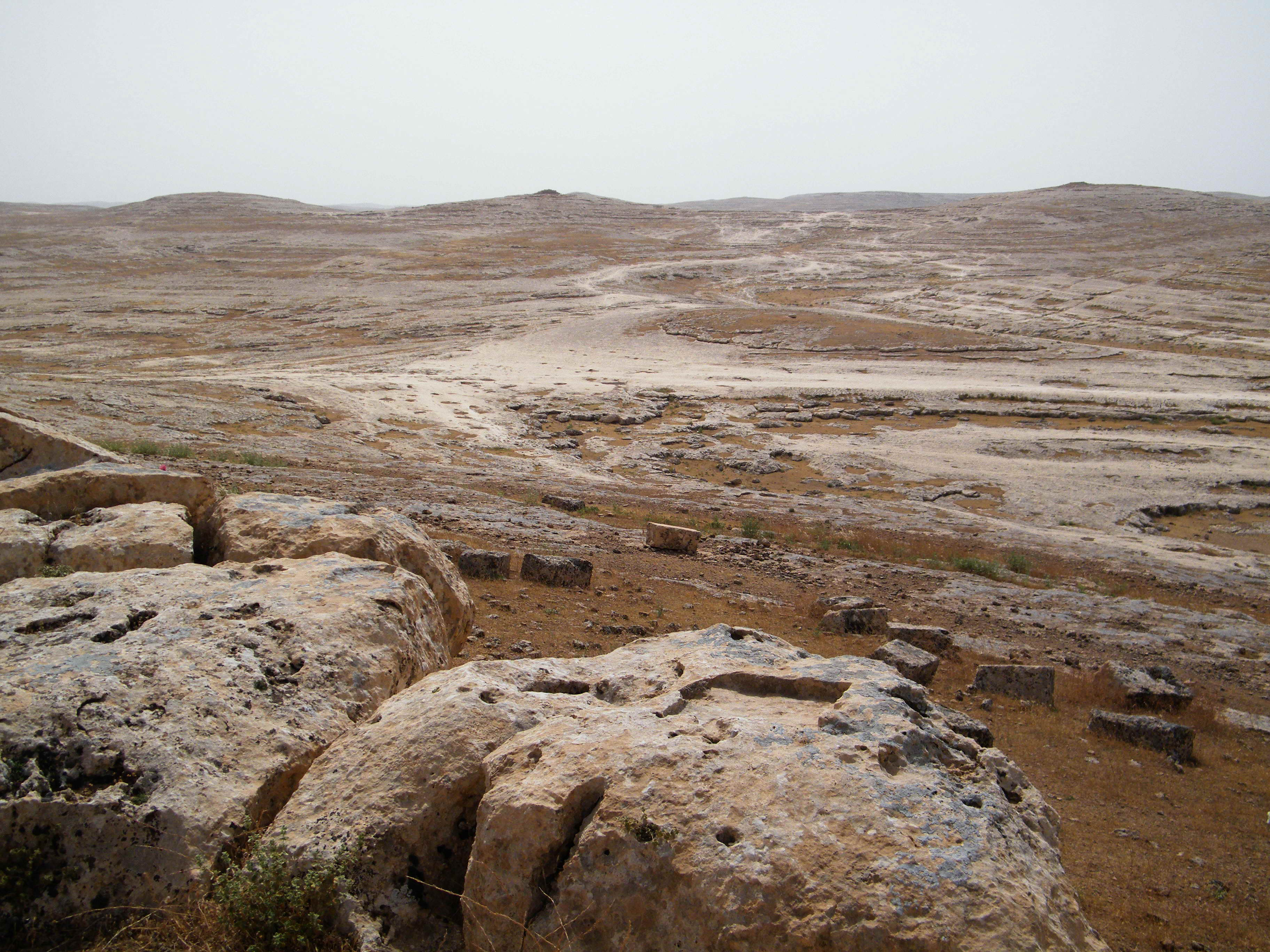
Landscape in the Tektek mountains, near the village of Yağmurlu

The Tektek Mountains (Turkish: Tektek Dağları; also Tektek Dagh) are a range of mountains located east of Şanlıurfa (Urfa, formerly Edessa) in southeastern Turkey near the border with Syria.

The Tektek Mountains are known for the proliferation of large stone markers and cairns at summit of every height. There are also at least two ancient sites located there: Karahan Tepe and Sumatar Harabesi.

== Physical geography ==
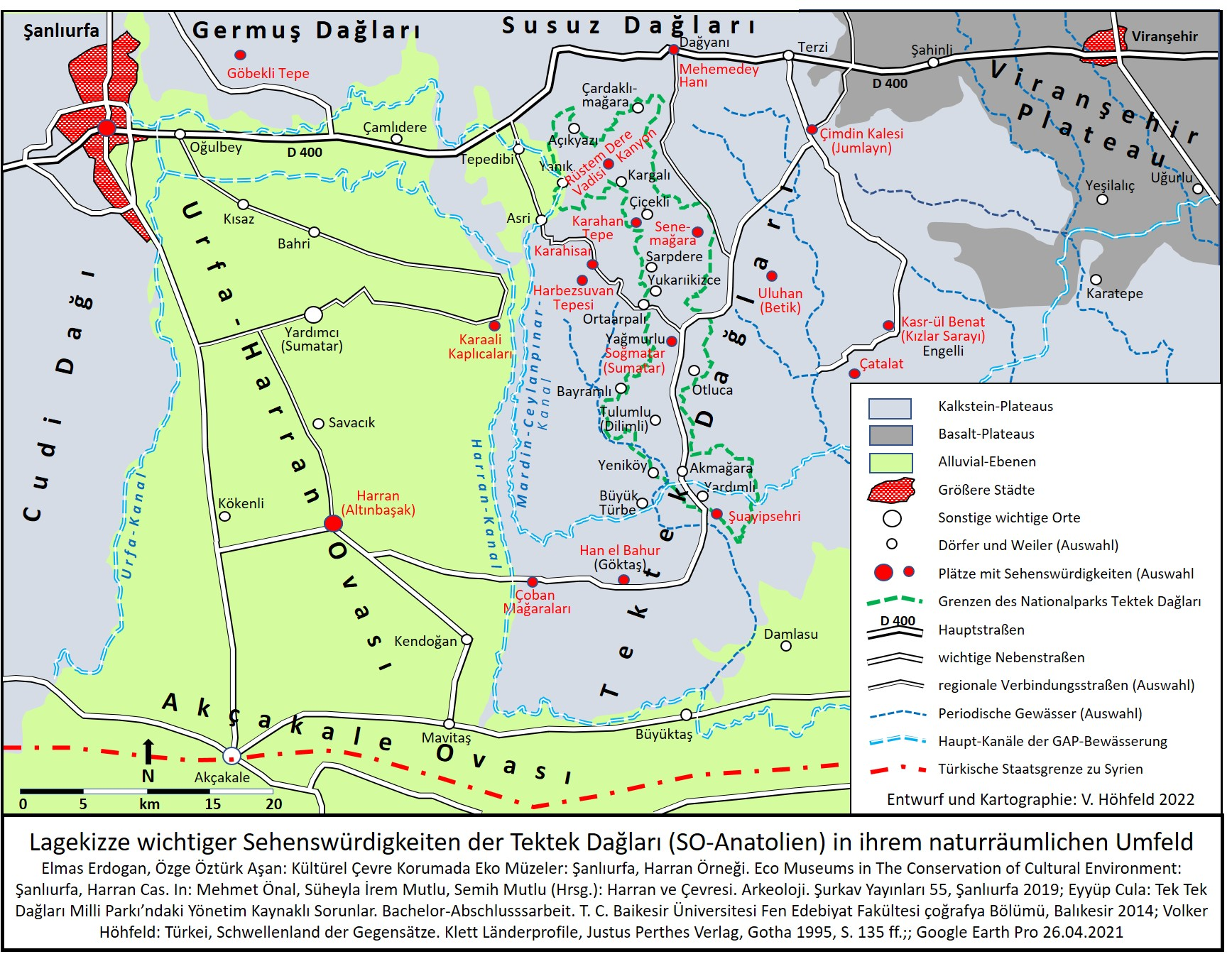
Geological map of the surrounding region

The Tektek Mountains are located on the northern border of the Urfa-Harran plain, between the headwaters of the Tigris and Euphrates rivers. Reaching an altitude of 801 meters (2,628 ft), this spur extends southward from the Tur Abdin mountain range about 30 kilometers (19 mi) away. The Şebeke Mountains to the west form a chain together with the Tektek and Susuz Mountains. The Viranşehir plain, which covers an area of 1,200 square kilometers (460 sq mi), lies between the Tektek and Karacadağ Mountains.

The mountain range is composed of Eocene and Miocene limestone, its valleys formed in the humid climatic conditions characteristic of the interglacial and post-glacial periods. There is no basalt present. The Tektek Mountains are devoid of woodland, with the exception of an area at the northwest end of the range where pistachio (pistacia khinjuk) trees grow.

== Inhabitants ==
Villages in the Tektek Mountains are inhabited by semi-nomadic pastoralists and agriculturalists of uncertain origin whose housing is constructed low to the ground, and sometimes within it, using the mud upon which they are situated. Crops can be grown in the spring, but the summer heat drives away most of inhabitants, many of whom graze their livestock elsewhere at that time of the year. Nomadic families from the Karacadağ Mountain come to the Tektek Mountains for the autumn and winter seasons to graze their animals and hunt wild game. Near a hill known as Keçili Tepe, there is a small village of the same name.

== Ancient sites ==
The two ancient sites located in the Tektek Mountains are Karahan Tepe, some 63 kilometers (39 mi) east of Urfa, and Sumatar Harabesi, some 60 kilometers (37 mi) from the same.

Sumatar Harabesi is an oasis that served as an ancient watering hole for semi-nomadic peoples, as well as a sacred site with baetyls and altars dedicated to the worship of the deity, Sin.

Karahan Tepe is a site that was discovered in 1997 and was dated to c. 9500–9000 BC by Bahattin Çelik, a Turkish archaeologist. Covering an area of 325,000 square metres (3,500,000 sq ft), it consists of a number of stone T-pillars and high reliefs depicting, among other images, a winding snake and the battered torso of a naked man. There are also polished rock statues of goats, gazelles and rabbits.

== History ==
In the 12th and 13th centuries, the Tektek mountains formed part of the region known as Shabakhtan. In the middle ages, the Tektek mountains were probably mostly inhabited by "pseudo-Sabians" – the moon- and planet-venerating pagans whose main religious center was Harran. They may have remained a significant community here as late as the 13th century, outlasting the pseudo-Sabian community of Harran by some 150 years.

Historically, agriculture in the Tektek mountains was rather precarious. Because the mountains are limestone, the soil and rock don't retain water very well, so water would have had to be stored in cisterns during summer and autumn, like in nearby Tur Abdin. There may have been an olive growing industry, which requires little water but steady markets – during periods of prolonged instability, as happened in the 13th and 18th centuries, olive growers would have suffered heavily. There has never been any significant woodland in the Tektek mountains; even when settled agriculture here was most prosperous, there was no wood available for construction.

One period of instability was during the late 13th century, when the Mamluks and Mongols fought several wars in the vicinity. Many of the people inhabiting the Tektek mountains probably left around this time and moved elsewhere. Finally, the Tektek mountains were completely abandoned by permanent settlement sometime during the 18th century. Why is unknown, although it may have been because of Bedouin raids.

== Specialty products ==
The butter used in Baklavacı Güllüoğlu baklava, made by a company founded by the Güllü brothers in 1871, is made from milk taken from sheep and goats in the Tektek Mountains. The butter is on average five times more expensive than the margarine used by other baklava producers, costing some US$15 per kilo.

== Bibliography ==
- The World Almanac & Book of Facts. Newspaper Enterprise Association. 1903.
- Facaros, Dana; Pauls, Michael (2000). Turkey (4th, illustrated ed.). New Holland Publishers. ISBN 9781860110788.
- Ross, Steven K. (2001). Roman Edessa: politics and culture on the eastern fringes of the Roman Empire, 114-242 C.E. (Illustrated ed.). Routledge. ISBN 9780415187879.
