= Şanlıurfa Province =

Şanlıurfa Province Şanlıurfa ili
- Province and metropolitan municipality
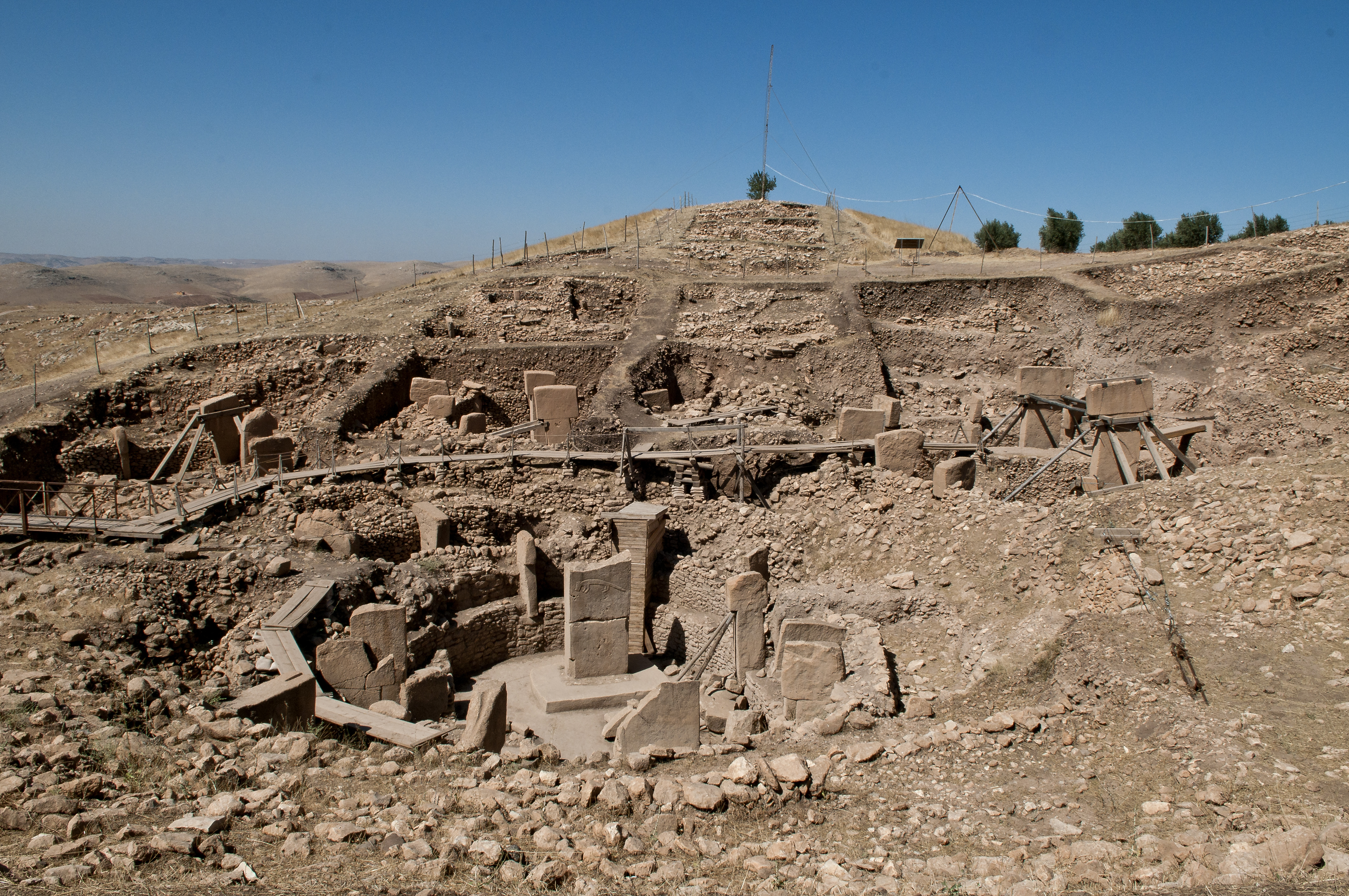
- Göbekli Tepe

- Location of the province within Turkey
- Country: Turkey
- Seat: Şanlıurfa

Government
  - Mayor: Mehmet Kasım Gülpınar (IND)
  - Vali: Hasan Şıldak
- Area: 19,242 km^{2} (7,429 sq mi)
- Population (2022): 2,170,110
  - Density: 112.78/km^{2} (292.10/sq mi)
- Time zone: UTC+3 (TRT)
- Area code: 0414
- ISO 3166 code: TR-63
- Website: www.sanliurfa.bel.tr www.sanliurfa.gov.tr

Şanlıurfa Province (Turkish: Şanlıurfa ili; Kurdish: Parêzgeha Rihayê), also known as Urfa Province, is a province and metropolitan municipality in southeastern Turkey. The city of Şanlıurfa is the capital of the province which bears its name. Its area is 19,242 km^{2}, and its population is 2,170,110 (2022). The province is considered part of Turkish Kurdistan and has a Kurdish majority with a significant Arab and Turkish minority.

== Districts ==
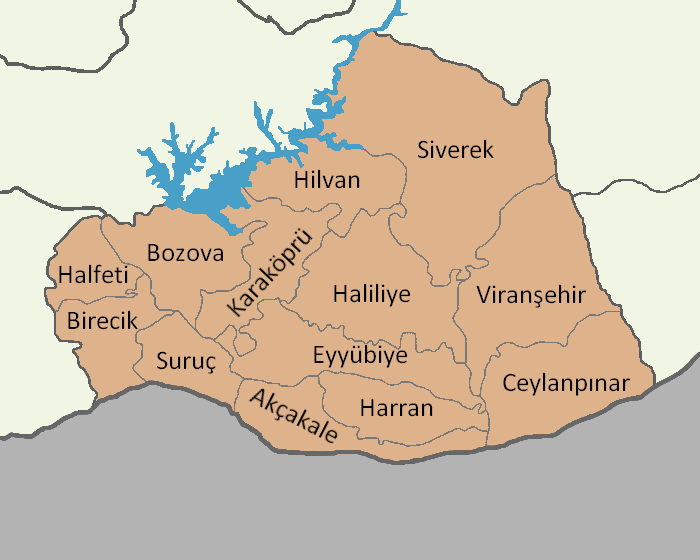
Districts of the Şanlıurfa Province

Şanlıurfa province is divided into 13 districts, listed below with their populations as at 31 December 2022 according to the official government estimates:

- Akçakale (123,721)
- Birecik (93,613)
- Bozova (52,680)
- Ceylanpınar (90,440)
- Eyyübiye (391,795)
- Halfeti (41,662)
- Haliliye (396,656)
- Harran (96,072)
- Hilvan (42,218)
- Karaköprü (265,035)
- Siverek (267,942)
- Suruç (100,961)
- Viranşehir (207,315)

== Geography ==
Rainfall by season in the Urfa region
1. Winter (51.0%)
2. Spring (29.0%)
3. Summer (1.00%)
4. Autumn (19.0%)

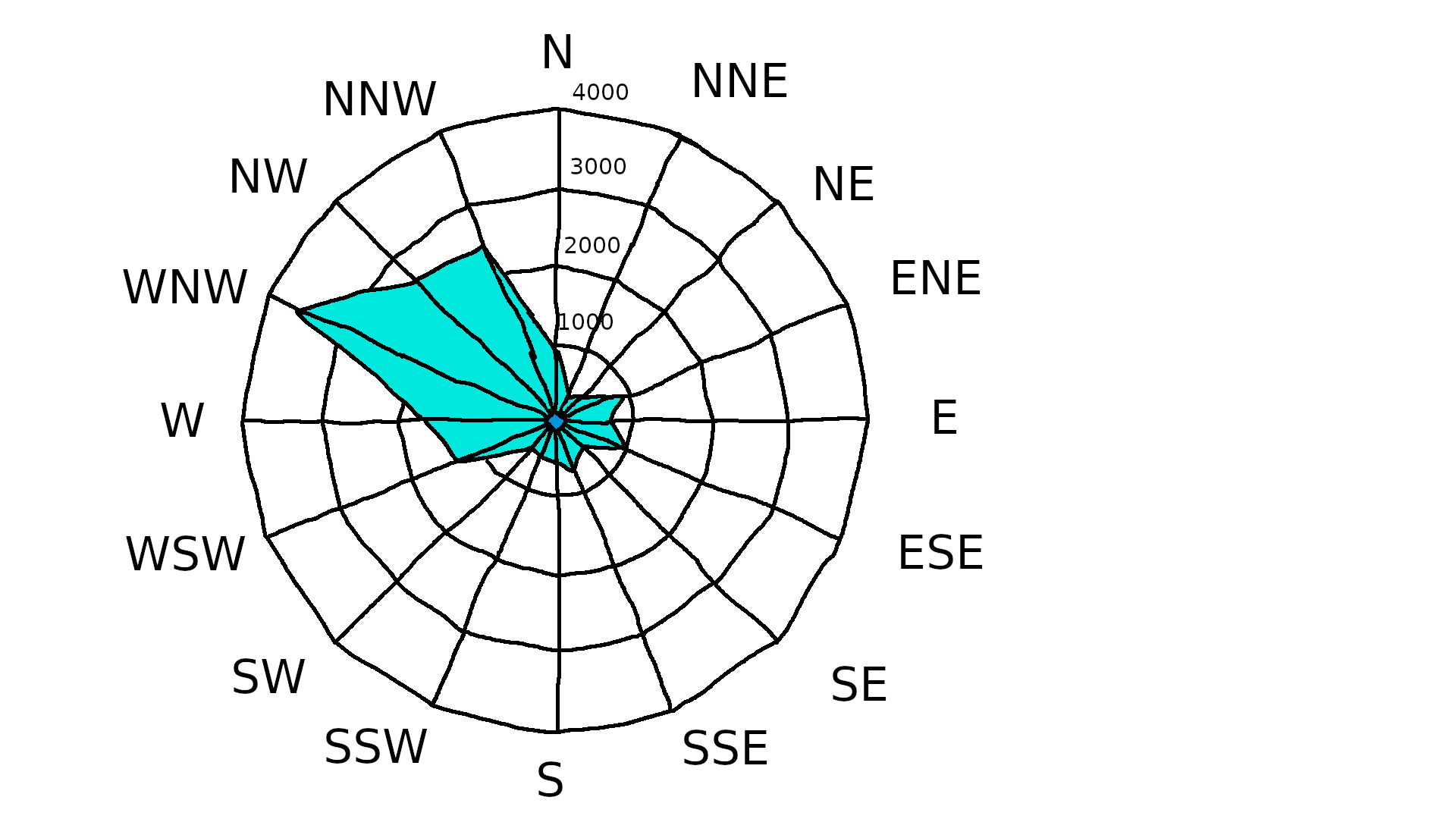
Wind rose of the Urfa region, showing the primary directions where wind blows from.

With an area of 19,242 km^{2} (7,429 sq mi), it is the largest province of Southeast Anatolia with:

- Adıyaman Province to the north;
- Syria to the south;
- Mardin Province and Diyarbakır Province to the east; and
- Gaziantep Province to the west.

Şanlıurfa includes several major components of the Southeastern Anatolia Project (in Turkish Güneydogu Anadolu Projesi (GAP)) designed to:

- exploit the hydropower potential of the Tigris and Euphrates Rivers;
- dramatically expand irrigation for agriculture; and
- develop the economy of the region.

This very large-scale, state-sponsored development project involved the damming, redirecting, hydroelectric tapping and other use of rivers in this broad, semi-arid region. (The rivers then flow into Syria and Iraq.) The GAP includes 22 dams and water supply for 1.8 million hectares for agricultural areas.

=== Climate ===
The Urfa region is characterized by a semi-arid Mediterranean climate. Rainfall mostly comes in winter, when the temperature is mildest; summers are very hot and dry. Annual mean precipitation is 458.1 mm. The annual mean temperature is 18.5 °C. The coldest month is January, which has an average temperature of 2.7 °C, while the hottest month is July, with an average temperature of 39 °C. The dry season typically begins around April, peaks in intensity around July, and ends around October. Wind typically blows from the northwest, with west-northwest winds being the strongest.

The area around Urfa and Viranşehir, and continuing towards Mardin further east, is the driest part of a "desert-like steppe" region in southeastern Anatolia. This area is characterized by vast plains as well as "low and broad hills [that] come [one] after another". As one approaches the Syrian border in the south, the climate gets drier due to less rainfall and it becomes more desert-like. In some areas, however, water from karstic sources makes things greener.

The plant life of this southeastern steppe region is less diverse than the steppes of central and eastern Anatolia because the dry season is longer here. Perennial xerophytes like Astragalus, Verbascum, Phlomis, Centaurea, and Cirsium predominate. In some sheltered valleys, though, pockets of Mediterranean flora still exist—remnants of what was once a more widespread distribution prior to a climactic shift in the region sometime in the past.

=== Geology ===
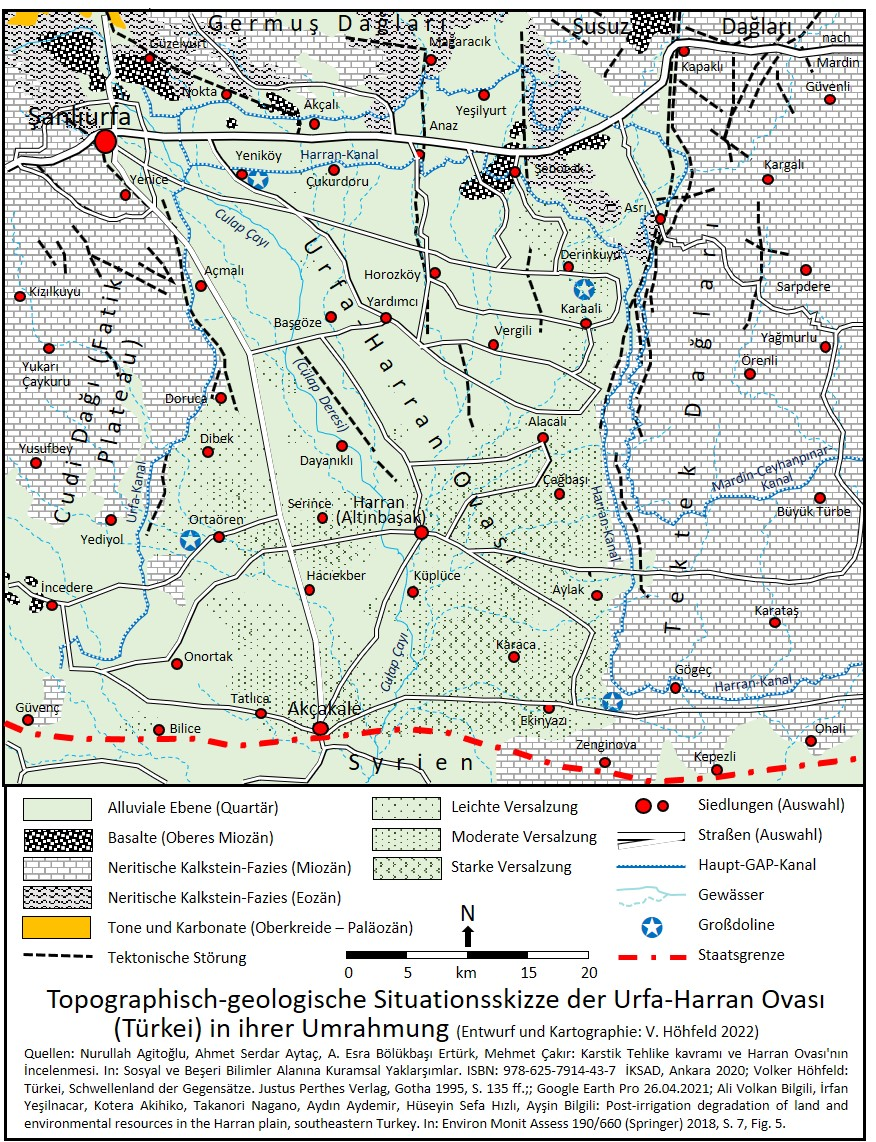
Geological map of the Urfa-Harran plain and surroundings (in German)

Most of Şanlıurfa province consists of Cenozoic formations. Calcareous formations are predominant on the Fatik plateau, west of the Urfa-Harran plain, and in the Tektek Mountains to the east of the plain. Among these are vast Eocene deposits north and west of Urfa, as well as younger Oligocene-Miocene deposits on the Tektek and lower Fatik plateaus. There are also basalt deposits, dating from the Pliocene-Quaternary periods, just north of the city of Urfa itself. These are associated with the Karacadağ Formation. These basalt deposits are generally covered by just 5 to 10 cm of soil deposits; in some places, though, there is thick enough topsoil for agriculture. On the Harran plain, more recent alluvial deposits from the Quaternary period predominate.

== Economy ==
Agriculture is the largest economic sector in Şanlıurfa province. As of 2000, 43% of the province's GDP is in agriculture, 40% service, 11% industry, and 6% in construction. The total GDP is US$1.85 billion.

=== Agriculture ===
Şanlıurfa province is a major producer of cotton, wheat, and barley. Cotton production in particular increased dramatically after the GAP was initiated in 1995. The influx of irrigation availability meant that many farmers could switch from dry to irrigated agriculture, and cotton's high market value enticed a majority of farmers to start planting it. The province's annual cotton yield rose from 277,000 tons in 1995 to 708,602 tons in 2004. By 2021, the province produces 42% of all cotton in Turkey. As of 2008, the province also produced 11% of all dry legumes, 6.4% of barley, and 4% of wheat in the country. Other crops include red lentil, pistachio, grape, sesame, and various vegetables. In terms of animal husbandry, sheep and goats are the most important. As of 2015, about 32% of the province's workforce is employed in agriculture. However, the employment share of agriculture has been declining. Another problem is that excessive irrigation has caused increased soil salinity.

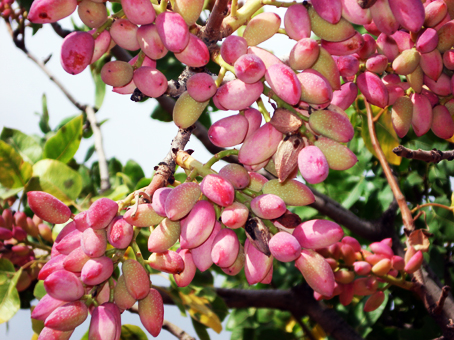
Pistachio clusters growing on a tree in Şanlıurfa province. The province is one of Turkey's leading pistachio producers.

Şanlıurfa province is among the leading producers of pistachios in Turkey. As of 2021, the province has 29.7 million pistachio trees and produced 38,576 tons of pistachios—about a third of the national total of 119,000 tons. However, most of the processing for the pistachios is done in Gaziantep instead.

The province is also a major producer of several varieties of peppers. As of 2021, Şanlıurfa province produced 77,663 tons of capia peppers; 6,180 tons of sivri peppers; and 1,296 tons of bell peppers.

Agriculture in Şanlıurfa province is dominated by large-scale landowners. Since the outbreak of the Syrian Civil War, an influx of Syrian refugees willing to work for cheap have changed the agricultural labor market here. Local seasonal farm workers, who demand higher wages, are unable to find work in the province and are increasingly temporarily migrating to other provinces for seasonal farm work.

==== Dairy products ====
Urfa cheese (Urfa peyniri) bears similarity to other cheeses in the region, such as Diyarbakır's örgü, Kahramanmaraş's Maraş-sıkma, or Gaziantep's Antep-sıkma. It is mostly made from sheep and goat milk. Most production is done in villages using traditional techniques and low-tech equipment and lacking hygienic standards or pasteurized milk; however, industrial-scale production has begun in recent decades. There is no single standardized method of production for Urfa cheese, so its qualities can vary. It is aged for anywhere between 3 and 7 months.

Another regional specialty is Urfa butter (Urfa yaği), a type of clarified butter made from sheep's milk. It is made in Urfa itself as well as in other towns in the province like Siverek, Viranşehir, Ceylanpınar, and Harran.

=== Industry ===
Industry has been increasing in employment share in Şanlıurfa province, reached 16% in 2006. The biggest industries include food processing (especially baked goods and dairy products) and textiles (especially cotton fabrics), which as of 2002 together employ 54% of industrial workers in the province. Other important industries (based on location quotient) include treatment and coating of metals (especially copper) and the manufacturing of pumps, compressors, and other agricultural equipment.

Important industries in Şanlıurfa province (as of 2002)
Industry	Number of firms	Number of employees
Manufacture of crude oils and fats	9	86
Dairy products and cheese making	6	1,727
Ice cream manufacturing	9	19
Grain mills	142	324
Bread, pastry, and other baked goods	803	3,315
Preparing and spinning of cotton fabrics	57	966
Wood carpentry and joinery	366	766
Baked clay bricks, tiles, and other construction products	57	189
Concrete construction products	8	121
Plaster construction products	5	22
Ready-mix concrete	6	105
Metal carpentry and joinery	106	270
Forging, pressing, stamping, and roll forming of metals; as well as powder metallurgy	47	105
Treatment and coating of metals	183	317
Manufacture of pumps and compressors	19	92
Tractor manufacturing	11	34
Manufacture of non-electric domestic appliances	42	106
Manufacture of electric motors, generators, and transformers	10	73
Jewellery making	82	103
Collection, purification, and distribution of water	8	224
Test drilling and boring	7	14
General construction	67	1,993
Construction of water projects	3	794

=== Services ===
The largest part of the service sector in Şanlıurfa province, both in GDP and employment, is wholesale and retail trade. Many wholesalers and retailers in the province are closely linked to the agricultural sector—for example, through wholesale of seeds for farmers, wholesale of dairy products, retail sale of meat products, or retail sale of textiles. Another important activity in this sector is freight transport by road, which has a high location quotient for the province because it lies on the main road connection between the port of Mersin and the Habur border crossing into Iraq.

== Demographics ==
As of 2000, the province has a population growth rate of 30.9%, which is well above the national rate of 14.9%. Average household size in the province is 6.87 people, which is above the national average of 4.5. About 42% of the province's population lives in rural areas and 58% in urban areas—a somewhat lower rate of urbanization than the country as a whole, which is 65% urban. The average per capita income is US$1,300 annually. The province has a low literacy rate—especially among women, who are only 52% literate in the province compared to 80% nationwide. The province also has high out-migration.

Şanlıurfa province has the highest population of Syrian refugees in Turkey. There are an estimated 350,000 to 400,000 Syrian refugees in the province, including some 80,000 living in 4 refugee camps. The presence of large Kurdish and Arab populations in the province means that there is less of a language barrier for Syrians in Şanlıurfa province than in other parts of Turkey, and the similar cultural and religious values make the province a more comfortable setting for many migrants as well. As a result, tensions between locals and refugees are somewhat lower in Şanlıurfa province than elsewhere.

Employment for Syrians is concentrated most heavily in the construction, retail and wholesale, and agricultural sectors. Syrian labor is desirable for many employers because they are willing to work for lower wages than locals. For example, while mechanized cotton harvesting is an option for farmers, it is cheaper for them to hire Syrian workers to pick cotton by hand. Competition between Syrian and local seasonal farm workers has contributed to tension between the two groups, as the influx of Syrian labor has driven local farm workers to migrate to other provinces for seasonal farm work.

Şanlıurfa province has one of the highest rates of child marriage in Turkey. According to TÜİK, there were 955 marriages of girls under the age of 18 in Şanlıurfa province in 2021, which was the second-highest in the country behind Gaziantep.

== Culture ==
The traditional culture of the city of Urfa differs from the rest of the province.

=== Cuisine ===
The famous çiğ köfte belongs to the culinary traditions of the city and was unknown to the rural population until 1980s. Tırşik is a traditional dish of the rural population within the province.

=== Games and dance ===
"Çan Çekiç Oyunu" is a traditional dice game of Urfa played with eight dice for money. "Dörtlü Oyunu" is a traditional dance of Urfa involving four people who each hold a red handkerchief in the right hand and a white one in the left hand. It is set to music played on the zurna and davul (types of horn and drum, respectively).

==== Playground games ====
"Derrebu Derinebu" is a tag-like playground game from Urfa that is a variant of the game "Darabil" from Gaziantep. In Derrebu Derinebu, players form two teams that face each other. A player from one team attempts to cross over to the other team, tag any number of players, and return, all while singing a rhyme without pausing for breath. The game locally known as "Arası Kesme" (called "Ara Kesme", "Esir Almaca", or other names in other parts of Turkey) is a capture-style game where one team tries to retrieve players from a designated area while the other team tries to stop them. A local variety of hide-and-seek (Saklambaç) is known as "Ebe Saklama". "Alkuç Balkuç" is an object-hiding game from Urfa where players stand in a circle and secretly pass an object from hand to hand. "Çukur Atma" is a marbles-type game of Urfa, except played with plum or apricot seeds instead of actual marbles. Another game particular to Urfa is "İğne Miğne Kiraz" and the finger-and-hand-based games "Beş Parmağı Yüz veya Bin Yapmak" and "Açıl Kilidim Açıl".

=== Music ===
A rich body of folk literature from Urfa is the mâni—a type of sung, single-stanza folk poetry consisting of seven lines with an A-A-B-A rhyme scheme. The hoyrat is a local subgenre of the mâni where the first line is missing a syllable. The hoyrat is a cultural tradition also present at Kirkuk in Iraq.

== Politics ==
On 1 January 1928, the province was included into the First Inspectorate-General over which an Inspector-General ruled according to the policies recommended in Report for Reform in the East. The Inspectorate was governed with martial law and span over the provinces of Hakkâri, Siirt, Van, Mardin, Bitlis, Şanlıurfa, Elaziğ and Diyarbakır. The office of the Inspector General was dissolved in 1952.

Şanlıurfa once being a relatively competitive province between the ruling Justice and Development Party (AKP) and the True Path Party (DYP), it is now one of the most solid AKP provinces.

While the AKP managed to win Şanlıurfa with a comfortable 43.04% during the 2004 local elections, it has since then increased its margins of victory here. Following the diminishing popularity of smaller parties such as the DYP, Şanlıurfa heavily shifted towards the AKP, winning the November 2015 election with 64.55% of the votes. Şanlıurfa once again showed its status as an AKP stronghold in the 2017 referendum, with the Yes vote winning with a wide margin of 41.8%.

The Peoples' Democratic Party (HDP) came in second with 38.1 in the general elections in June 2015, and with 28.2% the HDP was also second in the November 2015 general election.

The far-right Nationalist Movement Party (MHP) scored an exceptional 7.18% in the 1999 local elections. Its vote share eventually ebbed to a more usual 2.97% in the 2004 local elections. The MHP showed a significant recovery in the indecisive June 2015 election by winning 5.56% of the votes. However, the MHP went on to suffer from a nationwide loss in the upset November 2015 election, with its vote share declining to 2.75% in Şanlıurfa.

The centre-left Republican People's Party (CHP) usually maintains a modest share of slightly below 5%. Similar to the other two opposition parties, the CHP suffered a loss in Şanlıurfa, going from 4.10% in the June 2015 election to 2.70% in the November 2015 election.

The current Governor of Sanliurfa is Abdullah Erin.

== Places of interest ==
The province is famous for its Abrahamic sites such as Balıklıgöl, where Prophet Abraham was cast by Nimrod into fire that is believed to have turned to water. Also the Mevlid-i Halil Mosque, where Abraham is believed to be born in the cave next to the mosque is well known. Within the province, approximately 12 km (7 mi) northeast of the city of Şanlıurfa, is the pre-historic site of Göbekli Tepe, where continuing excavations have unearthed 12,000-year-old sanctuaries dating from the early Neolithic period, considered to be the oldest temples in the world, predating Stonehenge by 6,000 years.

The following tombs and sacred spots are located within the province:

- Prophet Ibrahim (Abraham)'s birthplace
- Prophet Ayyub (Job)'s cave and tomb
- Prophet Alyasa (Elisha)'s Tomb
- Imam Bakir's Tomb
- Shaykh Hayat al-Harrani's Tomb
- The first burial place of Said Nursi
- Rahma Hatun's Tomb
- Neolithic Temple at Göbekli Tepe
- Neolithic Settlement at Nevalı Çori

=== Gallery ===
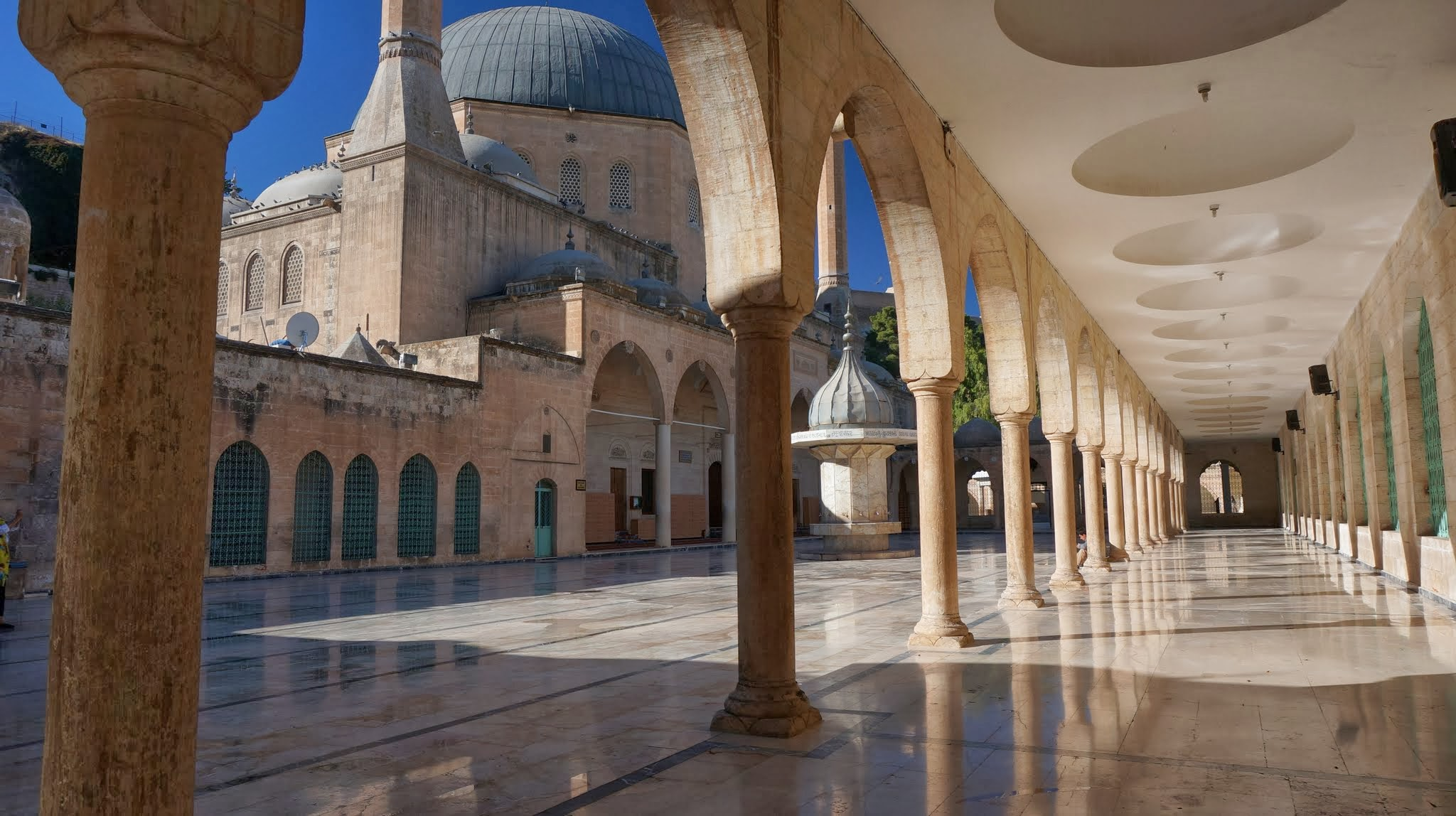
Ridwaniya Mosque

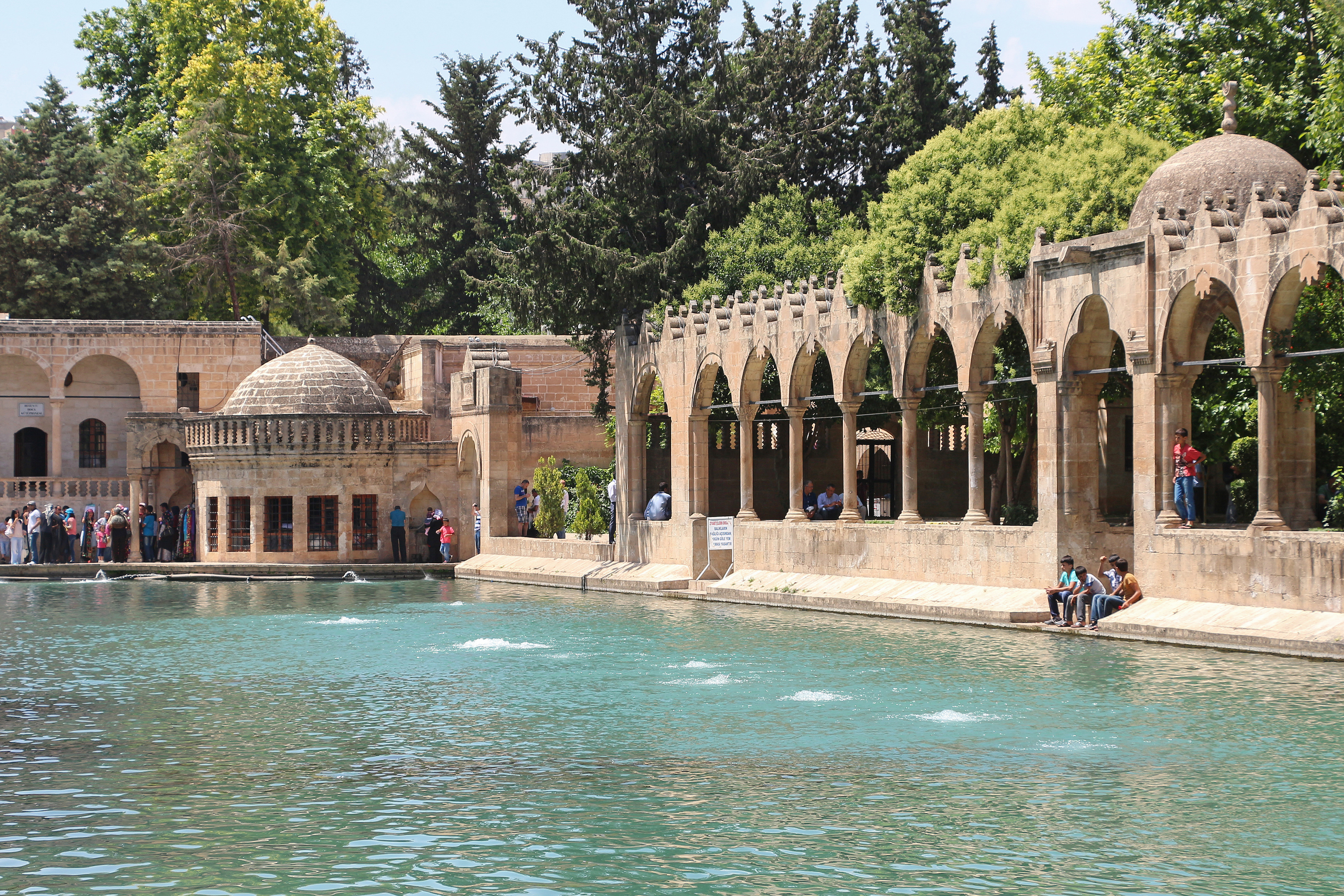
Balıklı Göl (Fish Pond) and people

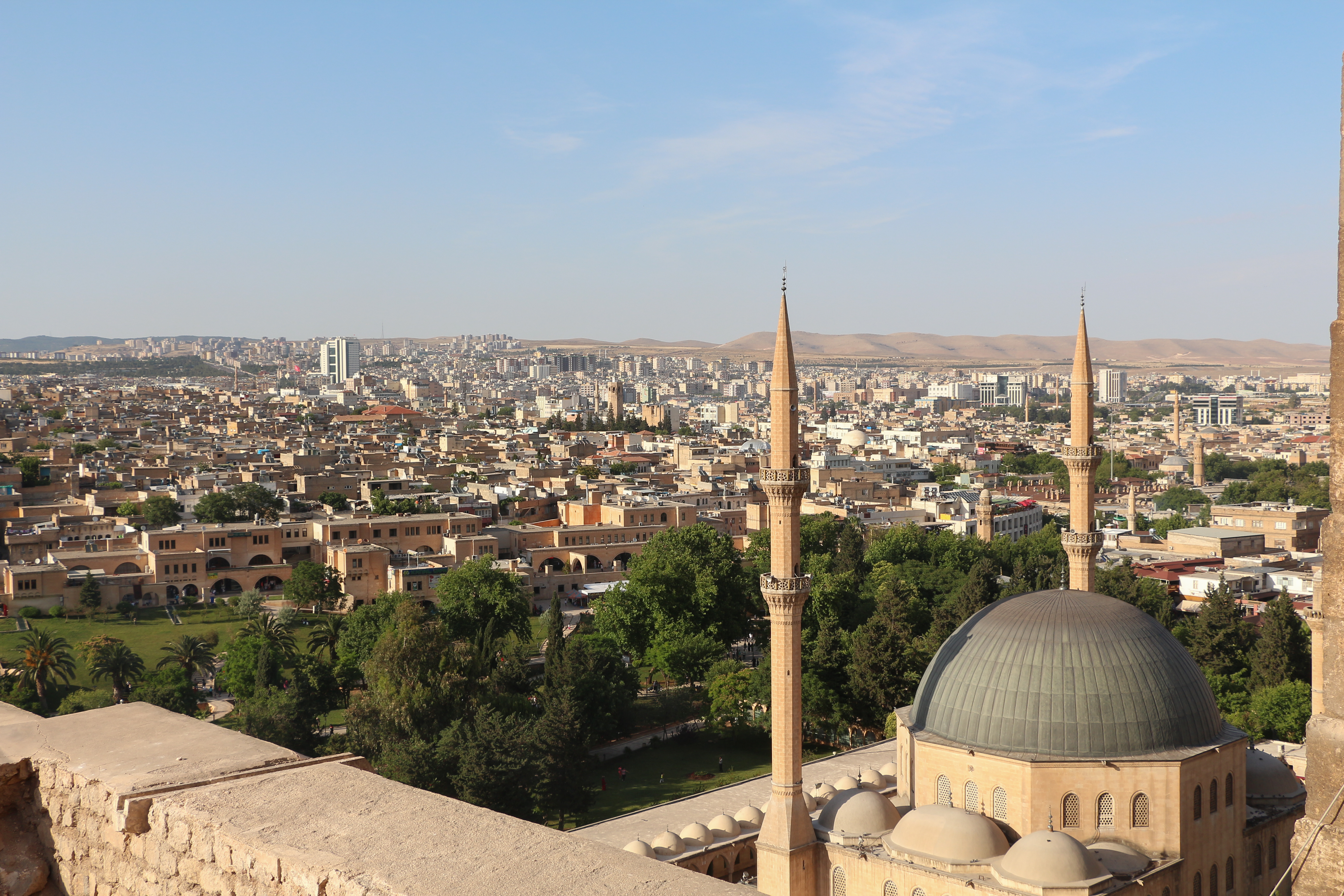
Mevlid-i Halil (Birth of Abraham) Mosque

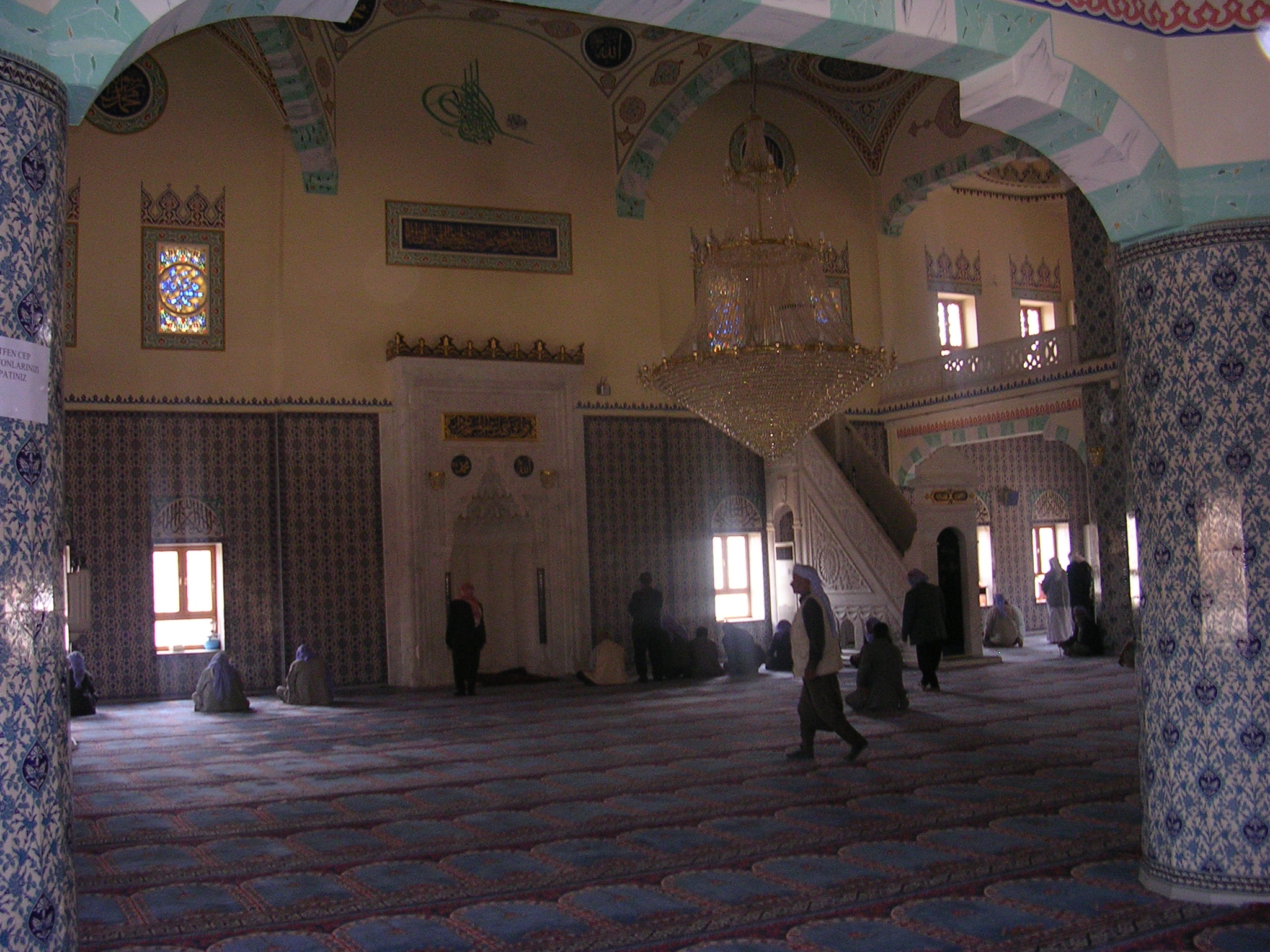
Salahaddin Mosque

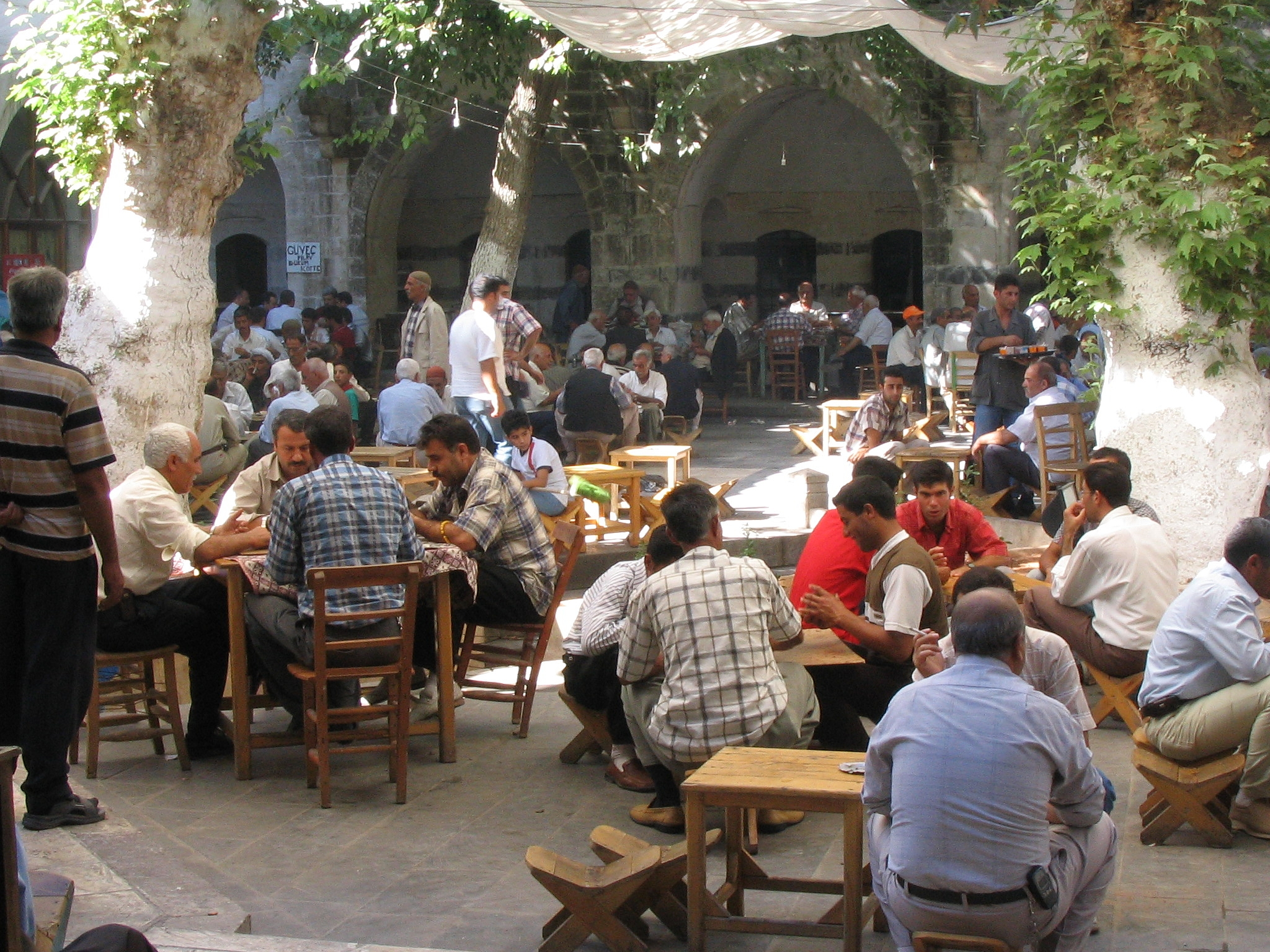
Urfa's central market

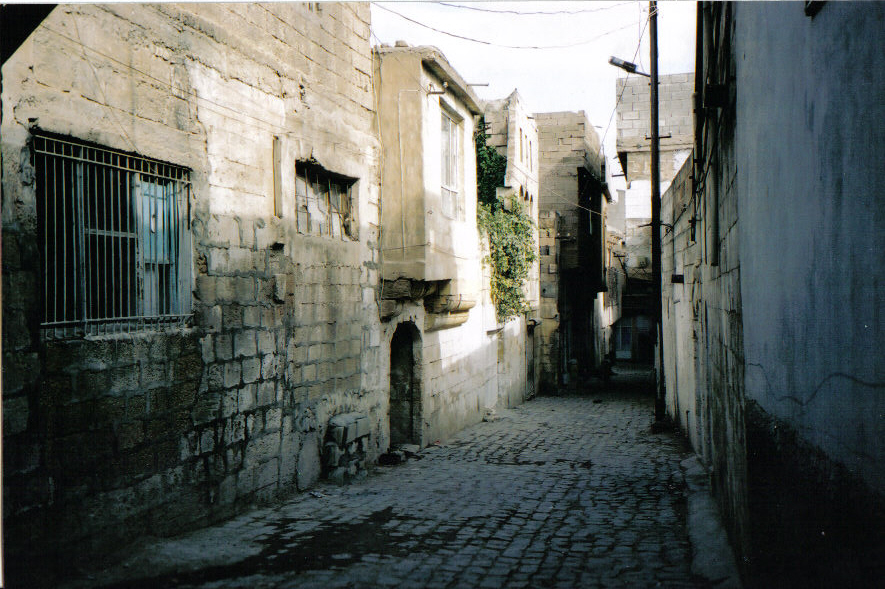
Traditional Narrow Streets

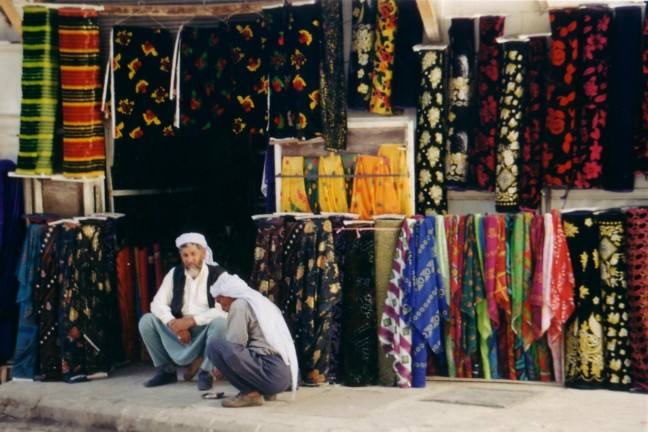
Urfa's retailers

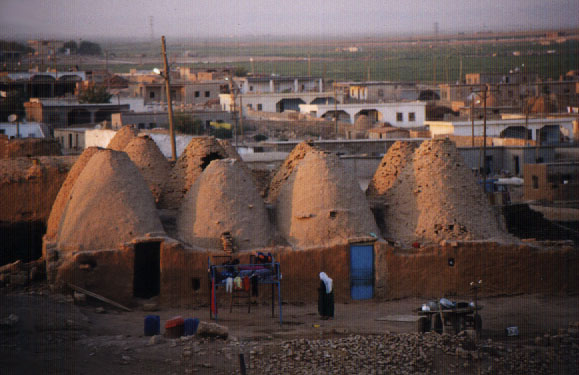
Harran District
