= Semra =

Semra may refer to:

- Semra (given name)
- Semra, Bhopal, a village in Madhya Pradesh, India
- Semra, Buxar, a village in Bihar, India
- Semra, Gopalganj, a village in Bihar, India
- Semra, Ghazipur, a village in Uttar Pradesh, India
- Semra, Lucknow, a village in Uttar Pradesh, India
