= Ülkü =

Turkish surname

Ülkü (literally: "ideal") is a Turkish surname and a unisex given name. People with the name include:

== Given name ==
- Ülkü Adatepe (1932–2012), youngest adopted daughter of Mustafa Kemal Atatürk
- Ülkü Azrak (1933–2020), Turkish lawyer
- Ülkü Tamer (1937-2018), Turkish poet
- Ülkü Uludoğan (born 1940), Turkish artist

== Surname ==
- Mehmet Ülkü (1877–1946), Turkish businessman and politician
- Semra Ülkü, Turkish educator

== See also ==
- Ülkü (magazine)
