= Kebede =

Kebede is a name of Ethiopian origin. Notable persons with the name may include:

- Aberu Kebede (born 1989), Ethiopian long distance runner
- Alemayo Kebede (born 1987), Eritrean football midfielder
- Ashenafi Kebede (1938–1998), Ethiopian composer, conductor, ethnomusicologist, historical musicologist, and music educator
- Berhanu Kebede (born 1956), Ethiopian ambassador
- Dawit Kebede (born 1980), Ethiopian journalist
- Daniel Kebede British trade union leader.
- Endalkachew Kebede (born 1980), Ethiopian boxer
- Getaneh Kebede (born 1992), Ethiopian footballer
- Liya Kebede (born 1978), Ethiopian-born model, maternal health advocate, clothing designer, and actress
- Moges Kebede, Ethiopian author, essayist, and editor
- Semra Kebede (born 1987), Ethiopian beauty pageant titleholder, model, and actress
- Tsegaye Kebede (born 1987), Ethiopian long-distance runner
- Yonathan Kebede (born 1991), Ethiopian soccer player
- Zeritu Kebede (born 1984), Ethiopian singer, songwriter, social activist, actress, and film producer
- Kebede Balcha (born 1951), Ethiopian marathon runner
- Kebede Bedasso (born 1949), Ethiopian sprinter
- Kebede Michael (1916–1998), Ethiopian-born author of both fiction and non-fiction literature
