= Uludoğan =

Uludoğan is a surname. Notable people with the surname include:

- Naim Uludoğan (1911–2010), Turkish artist
- Ülkü Uludoğan (born 1940), Turkish artist
