= Semra (given name) =

Semra is a given name of Turkish origin. Notable people with the name include:

== Given name ==
- Semra Aksu (born 1962), Turkish sprinter
- Semra Ertan (1956–1982), Turkish migrant worker and writer in Germany
- Semra Kebede (born 1987), Ethiopian beauty pageant titleholder, model and actress
- Semra Özal (born 1934), eighth First Lady of Turkey
- Semra Özdamar (born 1956), Turkish actress
- Semra Sezer (born 1944), First Lady of Turkey between 2000 and 2007
- Semra Ülkü, Turkish educator and university administrator
- Semra Yetiş (born 1987), Turkish mountain biker
- Semra Eren-Nijhar (born 1967), German-Turkish author and social commentator
- Semra Dinçer (actress) (1965–2021), Turkish actress
- Semra Güzel (born 1984) doctor and politician
