= Ayşe Sürücü =

Turkish politician

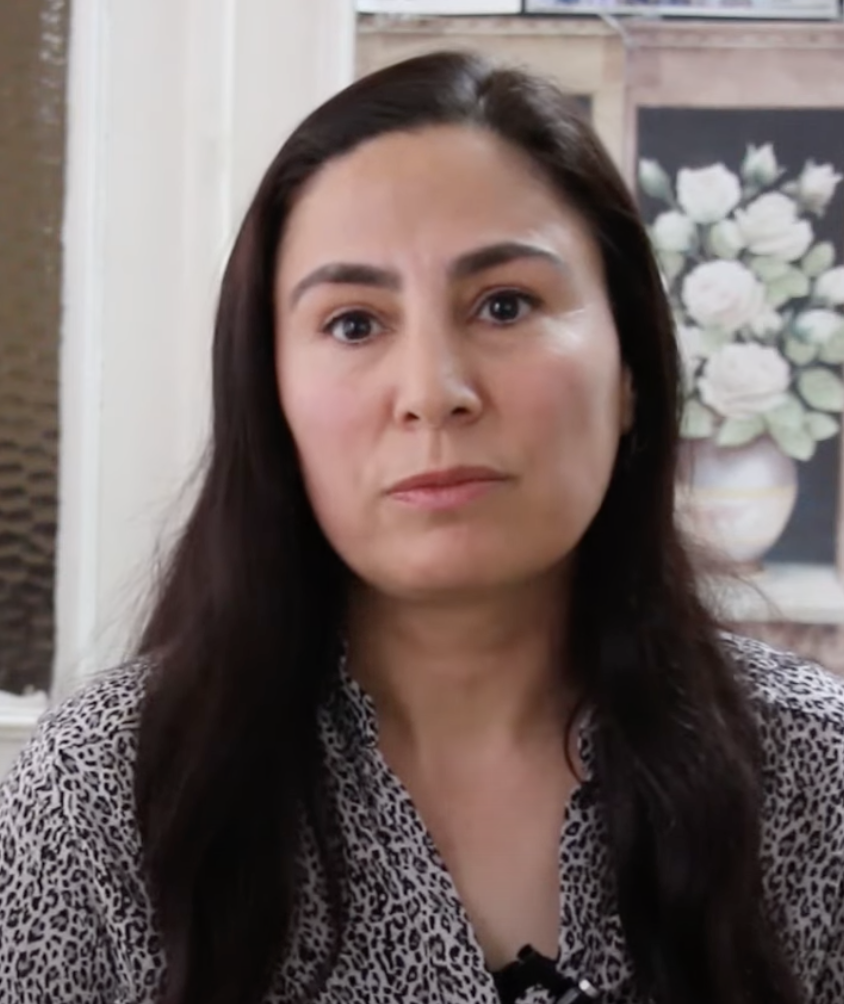
Ayse Sürücü, 2022

Ayşe Sürücü (born 1983, Viranşehir, Turkey) is a Kurdish politician of the Peoples' Democratic Party (HDP) and a current member of the Grand National Assembly of Turkey.

== Political career ==
She was elected into the municipal council of Viranşehir in the local elections of 2009 and later she entered the Peoples' Democratic Party in which she became the Co-Chair of the Viransehir district in 2014 and the Şanliurfa Province between 2016 and 2018. She was elected to the Grand National Assembly of Turkey in the Parliamentary Elections of June 2018 representing Şanliurfa for the HDP. She is a women's rights activist and a defender of gender equality. She also supports the use of the Kurdish language.

=== Legal prosecution ===
In October 2016, Sürücü was detained for a few days due to an investigation over terror propaganda. In March 2019 she was sentenced to more than one year and eight months in prison for taking part in a protest which was banned by the Governor of Şanlıurfa at the time. Her lawyer stated that the verdict will be appealed. In April 2020, an investigation with the aim to lift her and twenty other HDP politicians parliamentary immunity was initiated. In March 2021 another attempt was made to lift her parliamentary immunity, this time for attending a press statement concerning the International Day for the Elimination of Violence against Women on the 25 November 2019.
