= Ayele =

Ayele (Amharic: አየለ) is a male name of Ethiopian origin that may refer to:

- Ayele Abshero (born 1990), Ethiopian long-distance runner and world junior cross country champion
- Ayele Mezgebu (born 1973), Ethiopian long-distance runner
- Alemayo Kebede Ayele (born 1987), Eritrean footballer
- Ayele Seteng (born 1955), Ethiopian-Israeli marathon runner

== See also ==
- Haile, a variant of the name
