= Miran (tribe) =

Kurdish tribe

The Miran tribe (Kurdish: Mîran) is one of the Kurdish tribes who was a part of the Chokhsor confederation. The tribe eventually came to dominate the others of the tribal confederation for a period of time after the demise of Cizre Botan.

== Name ==
The name Miran (Kurdish: میران/Mîran) is believed to have originated from the Kurdish word Mîr, meaning "prince" or "lord," which was historically used as a title for Kurdish tribal leaders and rulers. The suffix "-an" denotes a collective or plural form in Kurdish, meaning "the people of the Mir" or "the princely ones."

The Miran tribe has been historically associated with leadership and governance in various Kurdish regions, particularly in what is now southeastern Turkey, northern Iraq, and parts of Syria. Some historical sources suggest that the tribe's name reflects its noble lineage and influence in the region, often linked to Kurdish emirates and semi-autonomous principalities during the Ottoman and Safavid periods.

While the exact etymology remains debated, local oral traditions and historical texts consistently emphasize the tribe's connection to ruling elites and military leadership, reinforcing the meaning of their name as "the tribe of lords" or "the ruling clan."

== Geographic Distribution ==
The Miran tribe is primarily found in the Kurdish regions of Turkey, Iraq, and Syria, with historical presence in parts of Kurdish Iran. The tribe's traditional strongholds have been in southeastern Turkey, particularly in the provinces of Şırnak, Hakkâri, and Mardin. During the Ottoman period, the Miran were influential in these areas, often serving as local rulers or military leaders.

In Iraq, the Miran tribe is found mainly in the Dohuk Governorate of the Kurdistan Region, where they have historically played a role in Kurdish tribal politics. Some members of the tribe also reside in Erbil and Mosul, having migrated due to political and economic factors.

In Syria, the tribe is predominantly located in the Al-Hasakah Governorate, especially in areas such as Qamishlo, and surrounding villages. There are also some of them in Kobanî in the Aleppo Governorate. Many Miran Kurds in Syria were historically involved in agricultural and trade activities, while some later migrated to urban centers.

Due to conflicts and displacement in the 20th and 21st centuries, many Miran Kurds have also migrated to Europe, particularly to Germany, Sweden, and the Netherlands, forming a significant diaspora community.

== History ==
According to the British Consul for Kurdistan, the Miran tribe was, "though not the largest, one of the most influential and richest tribes in the area around the highlands to south of Lake Van." Mir Bedrxan had to incorporate the tribe to be a part of his emirate by force. Upon the defeat of Bedirhans by the Ottomans, some Miran chiefs were contenders for the principal authority of Cizre Botan. The tribe was nomadic and in the winter season was in the area around Mosul, in spring travelled to the town of Cizre to engage in their annual trade, and in summer he was at the Van Lake. After the departure of the Bedirhanis the Miran and Milan tribes were the only Kurdish tribes who filled the power vacum in Cizre and were thus also rivaled (not in the negative sense). After the departure of the Bedirhani family, a leader of the Miran tribe, Mustafa Ağa was also a serious local contender. The Miran were also rivaled with the Tay/Tayan tribe. When Kurds were leaving Bakûr, 1500 families of the Miran tribe fled to Mosul. The Miran tribe was also rivaled with the Bedir Khans. The Miran tribe were also rivaled with Aghayê Sor of the Şirnak region. The Miran in Rojava are said to be closely related to the Barzanis.

=== Mustafa Pasha of the Miran ===
In the 1890s, the Miran tribe's Agha was made a Pasha by Sultan Abdul Hamid II and thus became the only chieftain in the former emirate of Cizre Botan who was an entitled Pasha. The Miran tribe also contributed regiments to the Hamidiye cavalry. Mustafa Pasha was a favoured Hamidiye commander. He used to be a shepherd ten or fifteen years ago in his tribe and was called "Misto the Bald."

In December 1900, Abdurrahman Badirkhan published an article in Kurdistan, the very first Kurdish journal, in which he described the deterioration in Kurdish-Armenian relations and denounced Mustafa Pasha, leader of the Miran tribe as a "traitor." It is worth quoting at length:

"Before Abdul Hamid II ascended the throne, the Kurds were knowledgeable and civilized people, having brotherly relations with Armenians and avoiding any kind of confrontation. Then what happened? Did Kurdish civilization and knowledge turn into barbarity, ignorance, and organized rebellion? Who else carries out the atrocities in Kurdistan but the members of the Hamidiye divisions, who are armed by the sultan and proud of being loyal to him? For example, there is Mustafa Pasha, the head of the Miran tribe (...) He used to be a shepherd ten or fifteen years ago (...) We do not know what he did to become a favorite of the sultan, who thought that he would assist in shedding blood and hurting people. He made him a pasha and introduced him with the title of commander of a Hamidiya division. (...) Would he not butcher the Armenians and pillage the Muslims?"

=== The First World War ===
The Miran tribe served the Ottoman Empire and was deployed all the way into Bulgaria. Dr. Mehmed Reshid admitted in his memoirs that without the support of the Millî, Mîran, and Karakeçi tribes, generally located in the west of Diyarbekir province, it would not have been possible to provide the necessary resources and requisitions for the Ottoman army.
