= Burç =

- Neighbourhood
- Location in Turkey Burç (Şanlıurfa)
- Coordinates: 37°16′20″N 39°46′19″E
- Country: Turkey
- Province: Şanlıurfa
- District: Viranşehir
- Population (2022): 325
- Time zone: UTC+3 (TRT)
- Postal code: 63700

Burç is a neighbourhood of the municipality and district of Viranşehir, Şanlıurfa Province, Turkey. Its population is 325 (2022). Its inhabitants are Yazidi. The village is located ca. 4 kilometres (2.5 mi) north of Viranşehir in southeastern Anatolia.
