= Ibrahim Pasha Milli =

Kurdish tribal leader and Ottoman commander

Pasha Ibrahim Pasha Milli
- Îbrahîm Paşayê Milî
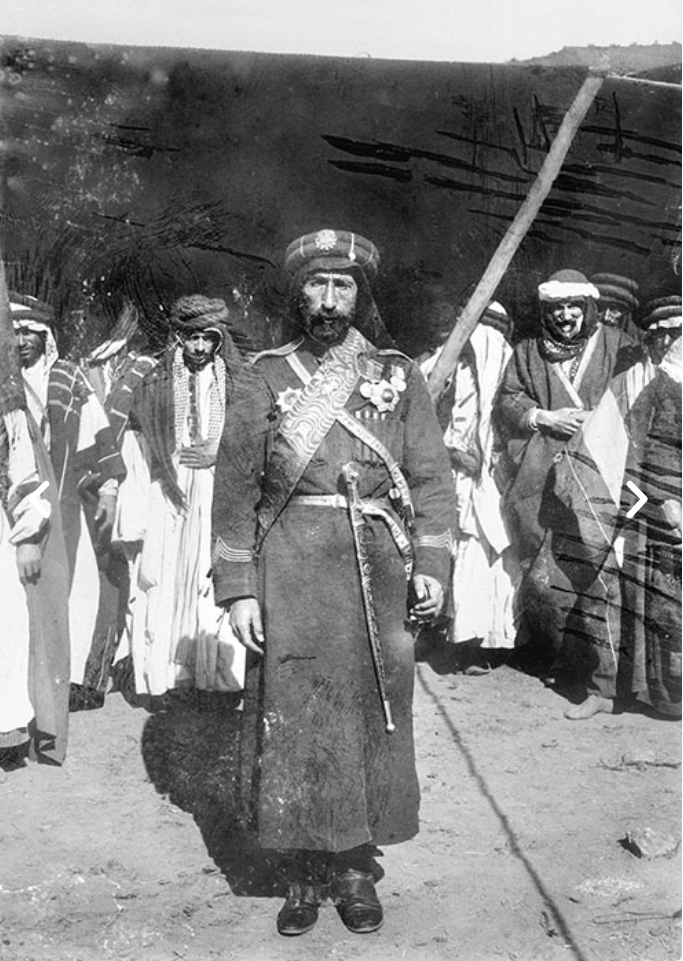
- Ibrahim Pasha Milli 1899
- Born: Ibrahim; January 1, 1843; Urfa, Ottoman Empire
- Died: January 1, 1908; Constantinople, Ottoman Empire
- Other names: Milli Ibrahim Pasha, İbrahim Paşa Mili, ابراهيم باشا ملى
- Occupations: Tribal chief, military commander
- Years active: 1863–1908
- Era: Late Ottoman Empire
- Employer: Ottoman Empire
- Organization: Hamidiye regiments
- Known for: Leader of the Kurdish Milan tribal federation; commander of Hamidiye cavalry; protector of Christians during 1895 massacres
- Title: Pasha
- Term: 1863–1908
- Opponents: Ziya Gökalp; Committee of Union and Progress
- Children: Multiple sons, including tribal leaders
- Awards: Title of Pasha by Sultan Abdul Hamid II

Ibrahim Pasha Milli, (born 1843 in Urfa – 1908 in Constantinople, sometimes also referred to as 'Milli Ibrahim Pasha' of the tribe of Milli, Milan, Mellan; Kurdish Îbrahîm Paşayê Milî ar ابراهيم باشا ملى), was the chief of the Kurdish Milan tribal federation in Upper Mesopotamia, the Aleppo Vilayet, and the Syrian Vilayet of the Ottoman Empire and the commander of several paramilitary Hamidiye regiments.

== Life and military career ==
Ibrahim was a descendant of the Kurdish tribal leader Eyyub Beg (Bey) whose clan headed a multi-confessional, but mostly Sunni Muslim and Kurmanji speaking federation of tribes that dwelled between Viranşehir, Urfa, Mardin and Diyarbakir and Dêrsim in modern-day Turkey, but also in what is now Northern Iraq's Niniveh Governorate, the Syrian Governorates of Aleppo and Hasakeh (Jazirah), and the Iranian West Azerbaijan Province.

During the first Egyptian military campaign of Ottoman Syria under Ibrahim Pasha of Egypt (not to be confounded with Ibrahim Pasha Milli) which weakened the Ottoman rule over the region, the Milli had taken control of the Euphrates east bank. Ibrahim Pasha's had also repeatedly quarreled with the Arab Shammar tribe, which he defeated at the banks of the Zergan river. During the Ottoman Tanzimat reform period (1839 - 1876) several Milli clans members were imprisoned.

Ibrahim Pasha took over the chieftaincy of the tribe in 1863 and developed political ties with the Ottoman Palace. In 1891 Ibrahim became a commander of the Hamidiye regiments in the rank of a Colonel. Following a visit to Constantinople during which he was given the title of a Pasha, he arose to a prominent supporter to Sultan Abdul Hamid II.

At the end of the 19th century Ibrahim Pasha had raised the substantial number of six regiments, counting 500 to 1150 men each, for the Ottoman Hamidiye cavalry. As he fell ill in June 1897, he was treated by the Swiss surgeon and doctor Josephina Theresia Zürcher.

In 1902 Ibrahim Pasha was given the actual rank of paşa (equivalent to Brigadier) at the occasion of a visit to the Ottoman capital Constantinople (Istanbul). He established his rule over Viranşehir and encouraged Christian craftsmen and traders, mainly Armenians and Assyrians (who were Chaldean Catholic), to settle there. During the Armenian massacres of 1895 committed also by several Hamidiye paramilitary troops (therefore also called 'Hamidian' massacres), Ibrahim Pasha is said to have protected and saved a considerable number of Christians. In 1906 Ibrahim Pasha went to Damascus, where he was deployed to secure the construction of the German-Ottoman Hijaz railway project.

Ibrahim Pasha extended his zone of influence progressively and, due to a conflict with the notables of the city of Diyarbakir among which was the Turkish writer and politician Ziya Gökalp, laid siege to the city in 1907 and coerced the citizens to pay him a tribute. Before the incident, representatives of the city had sent a telegram to the Sultan in Constantinople in which they demanded the withdrawal of Ibrahim Pasha's military credentials and those of his sons "who gave up the honor of being a soldier through brigandage and murder". General Talaat Pasha, who would later become a member of the ruling Committee of Union and Progress, was sent as special envoy to Diyarbakir by the Sublime Porte to deal with Ibrahim Pasha.

During the Young Turk Revolution of 1908, Ibrahim Pasha rushed for Damascus and defended the city for the Sultan. In 1909, upon his return to the Diyarbakir region, he was persecuted by forces of the Young Turk government, who wanted to restore direct control over the region, and died during the escape. Other sources claim that a group of rival tribesmen had pursued him and that he died as a result of dysentery near the town of Nusaybin.

== Legacy ==
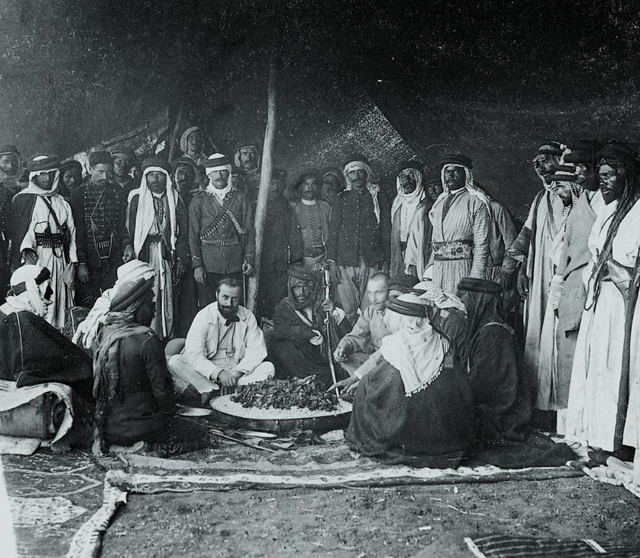
Max von Oppenheim with members of Ibrahim Pasha's tribe 1899, possibly also his sons.

In light of ethno-sectarian conflicts during and after Ottoman rule in Syria, and in spite of his reputation as a plundering gang-leader in Upper Mesopotamia, Ibrahim Pasha's measures to protect of Christians during the massacres, risking confrontation with Ottoman authorities, made him a reference figure for later generations of Syrian nationalists in their striving to overcome sectarianism.

Ibrahim Pasha received a number of European travellers, diplomats and scholars of Oriental Studies. The British colonial officer and politician Sir Mark Sykes who studied the tribes in Syria, wrote about Ibrahim Pasha's that he was the "most interesting" tribal leader and that his "mother was an Arab of the noblest race, his father a Kurdist chieftain of renown." In 1899 Ibrahim Pasha encountered the German archaeologist, historian and spy Max von Oppenheim and gifted him a peculiar stone statue from Ras al-Ayn. This led to Oppenheim's excavation campaign and the discovery of the 9th Century BC Aramaen kingsize of Tell Halaf .

After World War I and the Establishment of the French Mandate over Syria and Lebanon, members of Ibrahim Pasha's family took part in several uprisings against colonial rule, such as the Jazirah Revolt along the Euphrates against British Mandate for Mesopotamia (1937-1938) or the nationalist movement of the Syrian National Bloc for Syrian independence from French rule. The leading clan of the Milli tribe allied with several urban notables of Aleppo such as Abd al-Rahman al-Kayyali, Ibrahim Hananu, or the Barazis, another significant Kurdish clan from Hama. The sons of Ibrahim Pasha took parts in Guerilla operations against the French forces during the so-called Hananu Revolt in 1920 and fought alongside the Ottoman an Sharifian officer Ramadan al-Shalash. One of Ibrahim Pasha's grandsons today is the tribal leader Ibrahim Ibrahim Pasha (Basha, Bascha) who co-founded the 'Council of the Syrian Charter' and is a Syrian political and civil society activist.
