= Dilan Kunt Ayan =

Dilan Kunt Ayan MP
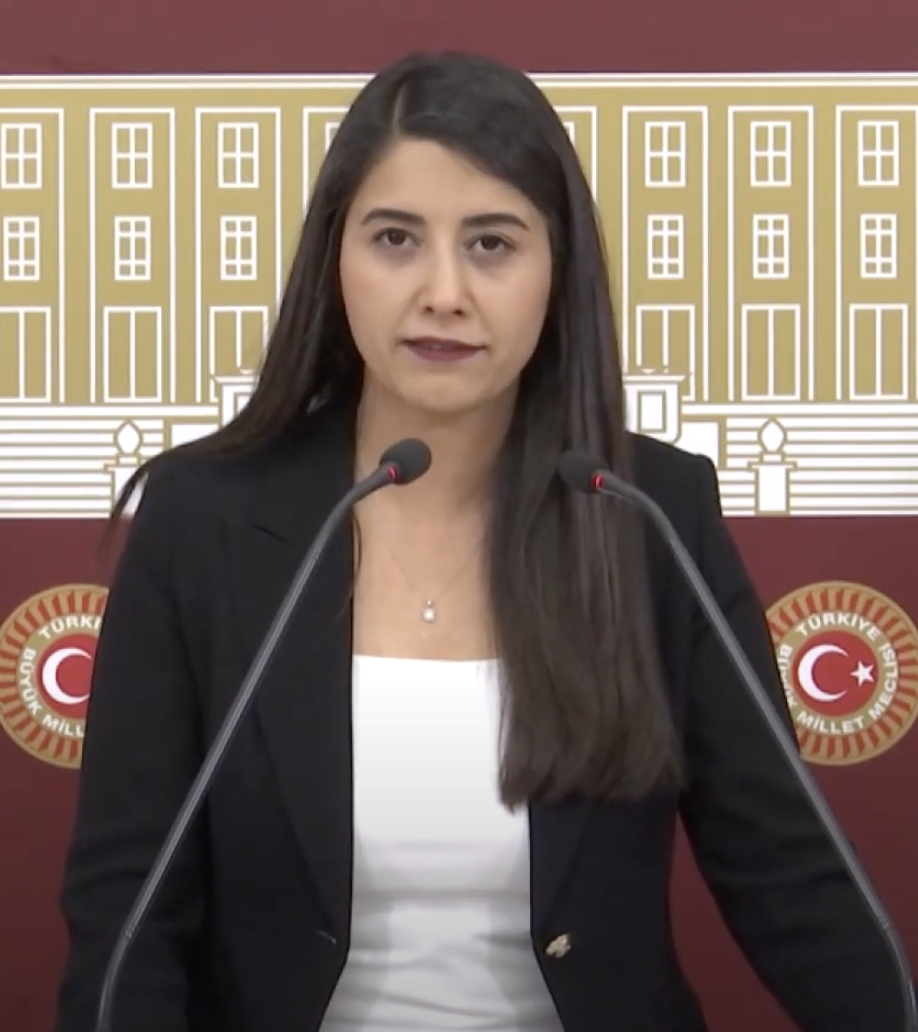

Member of the Grand National Assembly
- Incumbent
- Assumed office 2 June 2023
- Constituency: Şanlıurfa (2023)

Personal details
- Born: 1989 (age 36–37) Viransehir, Turkey
- Party: Green Left Party (YSP)
- Education: Law, Istanbul Kültür University

Dilan Kunt Ayan (born 1989 in Viransehir, Turkey), is a Kurdish lawyer, women's rights activist and politician of the Green Left Party (YSP). Since June 2023, she is a member of the Grand National Assembly of Turkey representing Şanlıurfa for the YSP.

== Early life and education ==
Dilan Kunt Ayan was born in 1989 in Viransehir, Şanlıurfa province and studied law at the Istanbul Kültür University. Following her graduation, she worked as a lawyer in Urfa and was involved in Urfa Bar Association in women's rights commission.

== Professional career ==
In 2016, she established herself as a lawyer in Van, where she became a Member of the Board of the Van Bar Association and was involved in the associations women's affairs. In March 2021, the Star Women's Association was founded in Van, of which she was elected its president in April of the same year. In 2022, she requested the permission for the realization of a march in memory for the International Women's Day on the 8 March, which was denied by the Governor of Van.

== Political career ==
In the parliamentary elections of May 2023, she was elected to the Grand National Assembly of Turkey, representing Sanliurfa for the YSP.
