= Dinçkök =

Dinçkök Gede
- Neighbourhood
- Location in Turkey Dinçkök (Şanlıurfa)
- Coordinates: 37°15′8″N 39°54′17″E
- Country: Turkey
- Province: Şanlıurfa
- District: Viranşehir
- Population (2022): 250
- Time zone: UTC+3 (TRT)
- Postal code: 63700

Dinçkök (Kurmanji: Gede) is a neighbourhood of the municipality and district of Viranşehir, Şanlıurfa Province, Turkey. Its population is 250 (2022). Its inhabitants are Yazidi. The village is located approximately 11 kilometres (6.8 mi) east of Viranşehir in southeastern Anatolia.
