= Üçgül =

Üçgül Minminik
- Neighbourhood
- Location in Turkey Üçgül (Şanlıurfa)
- Coordinates: 37°17′10″N 39°53′4″E
- Country: Turkey
- Province: Şanlıurfa
- District: Viranşehir
- Population (2022): 43
- Time zone: UTC+3 (TRT)
- Postal code: 63700

Üçgül (Kurmanji: Minminik) is a neighbourhood of the municipality and district of Viranşehir, Şanlıurfa Province, Turkey. Its population is 43 (2022). Its inhabitants are Yazidi. The village is located ca. 10 kilometres (6.2 mi) northeast of Viranşehir in southeastern Anatolia.
