= Semra Güzel =

Turkish politician (born 1984)

Member of the Grand National Assembly
- In office 8 July 2018 – 23 December 2022
- Constituency: Diyarbakır (2018)

Personal details
- Born: 1984 (age 41–42) Viransehir
- Party: HDP
- Education: Harran University

Semra Güzel (born 1984, Viranşehir, Turkey) is a medical doctor, a politician and member of the Peoples' Democratic Party (HDP). She was a member of the Grand National Assembly of Turkey (Turkish Parliament) until her dismissal in December 2022.

== Early life and education ==
She was born in Viransehir in the province of Sanliurfa where she attended primary and secondary education. She graduated from the University of Harran where she studied medicine. She then was employed at the Children's and Gynecological Hospital of Mardin in May 2009 and by November 2010 she became a medic in Nusaybin, Mardin province. In 2012, she followed up on her studies at the Anesthetics and Reanimation department of the Gazi Yasargil Hospital in Diyarbakir. Additionally, she served as Member of the Board and co-chair in the Medical Chamber of Diyarbakir.

== Political career ==
She was elected to the Turkish Parliament in the parliamentary elections of 2018, representing the HDP for Diyarbakir. In parliament she was concerned on issues concerning health and the Kurdish language. She questioned the fact that Health Ministry's medical hotline didn't provide a service in the Kurdish language but in other languages and also that the Health Cards issued in a hospital in Elazığ were in 17 languages but excluded the Kurdish language which is spoken by a considerable population in the province of Elazığ and also in Turkey. Due to press reports which showed her together with a member of the Kurdistan Workers' Party (PKK), Özgür Özel of the Republican People's Party (CHP) mentioned the party would approve the lifting of her parliamentary immunity. She defended herself claiming that she had been engaged to Volkan Bora and as they met in 2014, it was during the peace process between the PKK and Turkey.

=== Arrest ===
In September 2022, the Interior Minister Süleyman Soylu announced her arrest over terrorism related charges and accused her of having tried to escape to Greece with a false passport. Imprisoned, she was dismissed from parliament, for not attending its sessions in December 2022.

== Personal life ==
She was engaged to the PKK militant Volkan Bora, who was killed in a Turkish airstrike in Adiyaman.
