= Oğlakçı =

- Neighbourhood
- Location in Turkey Oğlakçı (Şanlıurfa)
- Coordinates: 37°15′39″N 39°48′15″E
- Country: Turkey
- Province: Şanlıurfa
- District: Viranşehir
- Population (2022): 175
- Time zone: UTC+3 (TRT)
- Postal code: 63700

Oğlakçı is a neighbourhood of the municipality and district of Viranşehir, Şanlıurfa Province, Turkey. Its population is 175 (2022). Its inhabitants are Yazidi. The village is located ca. 2.5 kilometres (1.6 mi) northeast of Viranşehir in southeastern Anatolia.
