= Harran University =

Public university in Şanlıurfa, Turkey

- Harran Üniversitesi
- Type: State University
- Established: 1992
- President: Prof.Dr. Mehmet Tahir GÜLLÜOĞLU
- Location: Şanlıurfa, Turkey
- Website: harran.edu.tr

University rankings

Regional – Overall
- QS Emerging Europe and Central Asia: 301-350 (2022)

Harran University (Turkish: Harran Üniversitesi) is a state university in Şanlıurfa, Turkey, founded in 1992.

== History ==
Şanlıurfa is the homecity of Harran University. It is one of the oldest settlements in the world, with its history going back to 11,000 years before now.

The first higher education unit established in Sanliurfa is the Sanliurfa Vocational School (1976). Then the Faculty of Agriculture (1978), and the Department of Civil Engineering (1984) both affiliated to Dicle University were founded. Following these schools, the Faculty of Theology was formed in Sanliurfa by Gaziantep University in 1988.

In 1992, as a result of a move to form 23 new universities, Harran University was founded (July 9, 1992; Law No.: 3837) and the schools mentioned above were affiliated to this institution together with two faculties (Faculty of Arts and Sciences, Faculty of Medicine), one vocational school (Sanliurfa Vocational School o Health Services), and three institutes (Institute of Natural and Applied Sciences, Institute of Health Sciences, Institute of Social Sciences).

In 1994, new vocational school (the vocational schools of Siverek, Hilvan, Suruc, Birecik, Viransehir and Bozova) and faculties (Veterinary Medicine, Economic and Administrative Sciences) were joined to the system. Later, the vocational schools of Akcakale (1995), Ceylanpinar (1995) and Kahta (1997) were established. The College of Health was formed in 1997.

A new vision to expand the educational programs was put into action in 2007, following which the Faculty of Education and Faculty of Fine Arts were chartered along with te College of Tourism and Hotel Management.

== University today ==
As of December 2015, Harran University functions with nine faculties and two colleges offering 4+ years of undergraduate degree programs and ten vocational schools which provide two-year associate degree programs. The students in three institutes enroll to get degrees toward master's or Ph.D. levels. Over 800 faculty members serve in about 70 different departments/programs to a population of 12,000 students. In Harran University, the language of education is Turkish. An educational system of two-semesters is followed.
