= Bozca, Viranşehir =

Bozca Xirbe Belek
- Neighbourhood
- Location in Turkey Bozca (Şanlıurfa)
- Coordinates: 37°11′50″N 40°0′59″E
- Country: Turkey
- Province: Şanlıurfa
- District: Viranşehir
- Population (2022): 357
- Time zone: UTC+3 (TRT)
- Postal code: 63700

Bozca (Kurmanji: Xirbe Belek) is a neighbourhood of the municipality and district of Viranşehir, Şanlıurfa Province, Turkey. Its population is 357 (2022). Its inhabitants are Yazidi. The village is located ca. 21 kilometres (13 mi) southeast of Viranşehir in southeastern Anatolia.
