= Bilge Özgen =

- Born: 1935 (age 90–91); Viranşehir, Turkey
- Genres: Ottoman classical music Turkish makam music
- Occupations: composer, lyrics author

Bilge Özgen (born in Viranşehir, Turkey in 1935) is a Turkish composer and lyricist. Özgen graduated from Ankara Boys' Senior Technical School of Teaching in 1959. He received his first music instruction from his father Sabri Özgen, an amateur musician. Özgen met Vedia Tunççekiç and Erol Sayan while he was a student in Ankara, a period which he calls his "second period in music". He worked as an instrument builder for a while, and retired in 2000 from his job as a lute performer at Istanbul Radio. Özgen was encouraged as a composer by Alaeddin Yavaşça, Niyazi Sayın, Yılmaz Pakalınlar and Mustafa Erses. A composer of memorable works, Özgen has produced more than 300 pieces.

== See also ==
- List of composers of classical Turkish music
