= Milan (tribe) =

Kurdish in Turkey and Iran

The Milan (Kurdish: Mîlan) is a Kurdish tribe that was historically at the head of a multi-confessional tribal confederacy, and is the subject of one of the legends of origin of Kurds, together with their rivals, the Zilan.

The tribal confederacy was most active in the region of Viranşehir, between Urfa, Mardin and Diyarbakir, but the Milan tribe was present in many other places including Dêrsim.

== History ==
The earliest account of the Milan was in the Maku. However, it was not until the Ottoman times, in the 16th century, that they became prominent. They were mentioned in tax registers, as present in Dêrsim as the Lesser and Greater Milli, and they were also the tax-farmers of the district of Mardin. From the early 17th century on, the Ottomans repeatedly attempted to sedentarize the Milan, even giving them the title İskan Başı, or Head of Sedentarization.

In 1758 the Ottomans feared the Milli chief Keleş Evdo (Kalash 'Abdi) was trying to set up an autonomous state in the Khabur Valley, and in 1800 they appointed his grandson Milli Timur Paşa as governor of Raqqa in an attempt to contain his ambitions. During the 19th century, however, the Millis gradually lost their position, and came under pressure from the Ottoman government during the Tanzimat reforms.

Some of them were deported to Ar Raqqah, where some of the Milan tribal leaders had already been the de facto masters of the region. As such, many notable families of Raqqah could trace their ancestry back to the Milan, though these had been mostly assimilated already in the late 19th century.

Its most renowned chief was Ibrahim Pasha, who led the tribe from 1863 to 1908. He contributed to the building of Viranşehir, and was a Hamidiye regiment leader, but during the massacres of Christians in the late 19th and early 20th centuries, he sheltered Christians and revolted against the Ottomans.

== Role in the Egyptian-Ottoman war (1831–1833) ==
The relationship began with the rise of the Alawiyya Muhammad Ali of Egypt dynasty) in Egypt, during the reign of Muhammad Ali of Egypt, while Ayub Bey was the prince of the Milli Emirate at the time. The Milli Emirate was completely independent, extending over a vast area from Lake Bingöl to Sinjar Mountains and possessed significant power—Ayub Bey commanded an estimated fifty thousand tents

During the Egyptian–Ottoman War (1831–1833), the Millis found themselves literally caught between a declining empire and a rising central power. The Millis cooperated with Muhammad Ali Pasha due to their shared goal of resisting the Ottoman Sultanate and freeing themselves from its centralized authority. This was also driven by long-standing animosity, as the Ottomans had executed many members of the Milli ruling family, including Ayub Bey's uncle and cousin, and earlier his grandfather, Mahmud Bey, among others.

The Millis provided food, livestock, and logistical support to the Egyptian army. They even fought alongside the Egyptians against the Ottomans and opened the way for Egyptian troops to enter Kurdish areas near the heart of the Ottoman Empire.

The military support of the Millis for the Egyptian forces was notable, particularly in the Battle of Hims (1832) against the Ottomans. When Ibrahim Pasha, son of Muhammad Ali, captured Aleppo in 1832, Prince Ayub Bey sent him a letter congratulating him. When the Egyptian forces reached Urfa, Ayub Bey met with Muho Bey (an officer of Muhammad Ali) in Qarsaqonli. After the meeting, Milli forces under Ayub Bey attacked and occupied the city of Diyarbakır. In gratitude, Muhammad Ali sent Ayub Bey a gift: a pair of golden pistols and a gold sword hilt

However, the alliance began to falter as tensions rose between the Millis and the Egyptians, who started interfering heavily in Milli affairs—something Prince Ayub Bey, formerly independent, could not accept.

In 1834, Muho Bey (an officer of Muhammad Ali) sought to strike Ayub Bey using his cavalry due to Ayub’s inclination toward independence and his communication with Rashid Pasha (an Ottoman commander). Ayub Bey then lent his support to the Ottomans, which led to a split within the Milli tribe. A misunderstanding later arose between Ayub Bey and Mehmed Rashid Pasha over villages that Ayub Bey had controlled for over thirty years.

At this point, Ayub Bey found himself at odds with both the Egyptians and the Ottomans—who were themselves at war—while his emirate sat geographically between their territories, the Ottomans in the north and the Egyptians in the south.

Rashid Pasha launched a campaign against the Millis to reduce the influence of Kurdish emirates in the region by force. After several battles, Ayub Bey sought refuge in Egyptian-controlled territory. Later, Rashid Pasha granted him amnesty but then arrested and imprisoned him, where he died shortly thereafter.

There is a discrepancy between sources: Ottoman-based sources claim Ayub Bey died in prison, while Egyptian sources suggest he was released. However, the Ottoman version is more credible, as they were the ones who imprisoned him. Moreover, the Prince of Kurdish Princes reportedly told Mark Sykes that Ayub Bey was executed in Diyarbakir.

The Milli Emirate lost a significant portion of its power and territory following Rashid Pasha’s campaign. After Ayub Bey’s death, his nephew, Prince Timawi Bey, took leadership of the emirate.

Prince Timawi Bey reestablished an alliance with the Egyptians and launched an attack on Mardin, capturing it. The Milli Emirate regained some of its strength, but after the Egyptian forces withdrew, the governor of Diyarbakir attacked Mardin and killed Timawi Bey in battle.

Following the Egyptian withdrawal and Prince Timawi’s death, his son Prince Mahmud Bey assumed leadership. Later, the governor of Diyarbakir attacked Viranşehir, captured Mahmud Bey, and imprisoned him. In response, Mahmud’s son Ibrahim Bey (later known as Prince of Kurdish Princes Ibrahim Pasha) traveled to Egypt to seek help from Khedive Ismail. Ismail mediated with Sultan Abdulaziz, and Mahmud Bey was released

emirates in the year 1835. The Milli Emirate (Emirate of Milan) appears on this map at a critical contact point between the Ottoman Empire and the Egyptian state. However, the map reflects the emirate in a weakened state, following its significant territorial losses in the wake of the Ottoman campaign led by Reşid Pasha and the death of Prince Ayub Bey in 1834, as documented by Dr. Winter. This period also marks the beginning of the reign of Prince Timawi Bey, Ayub's nephew.

== Legend ==
The Milan, together with the Zilan, are by many tribes considered to be their legendary parental tribe. According to Sykes, Ibrahim Pasha's own explanation was as follows: "Years and years ago the Kurds were divided into two branches, the Milan and Zilan; there were 1,200 tribes of the Milan, but God was displeased with them and they were scattered in all directions, some vanished, others remained; such as remained respect me as the head of the Milan."

One variation adds a third branch, the Baba Kurdi. According to one version of the legend, the Milan settled in Dêrsim, but Sultan Selim ordered some to sedentarize and build houses, and others to nomadize southward.

There's another version of the legend, as recounted by Celadet Bedirxan. In it, the ancestor of the Kurds was a man named ‘Kurd' living on the mountains, who died during heavy snow fall; only two of his sons survived, one was named Mil, the other Zil.

A famous semi-historical Yazidi figure of Kurdish folklore, Derwêşê Evdî, was of the Şerqî tribe of the Milan.

== Tribes ==
Being a tribal confederacy, the Milan historically attracted many and lost many constituent tribes. Next to the Mîlan themselves, the following are the six core tribes.

- Khidrekan
- Çemkan
- Dodikan
- Koran
- Şerqiyan
- Tirkan
- Nasıran
