= Josephina Theresia Zürcher =

Swiss medic (1866–1932)

Josephina Theresia Fallscher-Zürcher
- Born: Josephina Theresia Zürcher; 1 October 1866; Zürich
- Died: 10 July 1932 (aged 65); Stuttgart
- Other name: Sephy
- Citizenship: Swiss, after the marriage German
- Education: University of Zurich
- Occupation: Medic

Josephina Theresia Zürcher (1866–1932) was a Swiss medic known for being one of the first women to serve as a medic in the Ottoman Empire. She served as a doctor in several cities, such as Aleppo, Marash, Antakya, and Haifa.

== Early life and education ==
She was born on 1 October 1866 as the fourth child to Chief Bedel of the ETH Zurich, Karl Joseph Eduard Zürcher, and Anna-Barbara Hirt. Her parents had a close relationship with Gottfried Keller, who attended her baptism ceremony. After her father became ill in 1874, a medic advised the family to move to the countryside, and the family bought a farm in Urdorf. In Urdorf, her father became a goose breeder, and her mother cared for children in the summer months. Her father didn't recover fully and died in 1876. Being a half-orphan, she and her brother came into the care of a legal guardian who sent them to an orphanage as her mother couldn't be the head of the family as a woman. In the orphanage, she graduated from school at the age of fifteen. After some discussions between herself, her mother, and the orphanage's authority, she was eventually allowed to enter the vocational school. By 1886, she began to study medicine at the University of Zurich and was the fifth woman who registered for the state exam to become a medic in 1891. However, although she was allowed to work as a medic in Switzerland, the clinics refused to employ her. She went to Davos, where she was absolved from military service. From December 1891 to April 1894, she was able to act as a substitute for a female medic in her practice in Bern. She returned to focus on her studies and obtained her Doctorate with a dissertation on Joan d'Arc from a psychological and psychopathological point of view in 1895. She was the 13. Swiss woman to obtain a doctorate in medicine. Her doctoral advisor was the Swiss psychiatrist Auguste Forel, who also suggested the theme of the dissertation.

== Professional life ==
After graduation, she went to Dresden, where she was employed in the Gynaecology department of the Lahmann Sanatorium "White Deer" for some time. It was in Dresden where she came into contact with Alfred Ilg, a Swiss advisor to the Abyssinian King Menilek who wanted to recruit Zürcher as a medic for the noblewomen of Addis Abeba. Zürcher declined after she learned that Menilek would reward her services only in territory but not in money. At about the same time, she received a call from the German Orientalist Johannes Lepsius, who encouraged her to set up a clinic for the Armenians in Urfa. After some negotiations, she was allowed to enter the Ottoman Empire as a doctor under the precondition that she would dress as a man for as long she was not in an exclusively female environment after she had passed Aleppo on her way to Urfa.

=== In the Ottoman Empire ===
In May 1897, she left Switzerland and travelled from Trieste to Beirut on a ship of the Austrian Lloyd. Over Alexandretta and Aleppo, she reached Urfa on the 3 July 1897. While in a caravan from Alexandretta to Urfa, she stayed in several Kurdish villages and treated the Kurdish tribal leader Ibrahim Pasha. In Urfa, she established a clinic for the Armenian Charity (later the German Oriental Mission), where Armenian Abraham Attarian assisted her. In the clinic, surgeries and ophthalmological treatments were performed. The treatments were usually free, but with the wealthy, terms on just remuneration were agreed upon. Her stay in Urfa was cut short, as she was prohibited from continuing her work as a medic by the Ottoman authorities. In March 1898, Zürcher was permitted to practice as a medic in the Vilayet of Aleppo, after which she and her husband settled in Aleppo, where they established a practice. She was the only European medic in the region, which gave her a valuable status among the local population as well as in the European circles. During a Cholera epidemic, she opened a pharmacy. Shortly after, the local government official demanded renovation of the clinic's license. Later, he also insisted that pharmacies be allowed to provide services with an Ottoman license. After more obstacles, she decided to move on.

Between 1904 and 1905, she acted as a substitute for the doctor of the German Missionary hospital in Marash. In 1905, she established a practice in Antakya. In 1905, her husband Henry was offered employment as an accountant in the Deutsche Palästina-Bank, and she agreed to follow him to Haifa, the city of his Henry youth. The decision was not easy, as her passion was her work as a doctor, and Henry's employment would mean she had to end her work in Antakya. However, her salary depended on what her clients could give, how it was common for the Ottoman Empire doctors, and that Henry's employment provided the family with a calculable income, and she agreed to move to Haifa.

=== In Palestine ===
In Haifa, she was a doctor for the surrounding villages and the Baháʼí Faith community. In 1912, she moved to Nablus and established a private medical practice. In October 1915, her husband had to liquidate the local branch of the Deutsche Palästina-Bank in Nablus due to the outbreak of World War I. Following the family's settlement in Jerusalem, Zürcher prevented the closure of the German hospital as she (contrary to the acting head doctor) had a permit from the Ottoman Authorities to act as a medic in the Syrian provinces.

== Later life ==
As her husband Henry was drafted, she returned to Germany in 1917, where she was a doctor in Stuttgart. She returned to the Near East between 1922 and 1930 before settling in Stuttgart for the last two years of her life.

== Personal life ==
She married Henry Fallscher in 1899 at the German Consulate and subsequently became a German citizen. Henry was born to a German family of Swiss descent in Jerusalem. She gave birth to a girl in September 1901. She died on the 10 July 1932 in Stuttgart.
