= Viranşehir =

- District and municipality
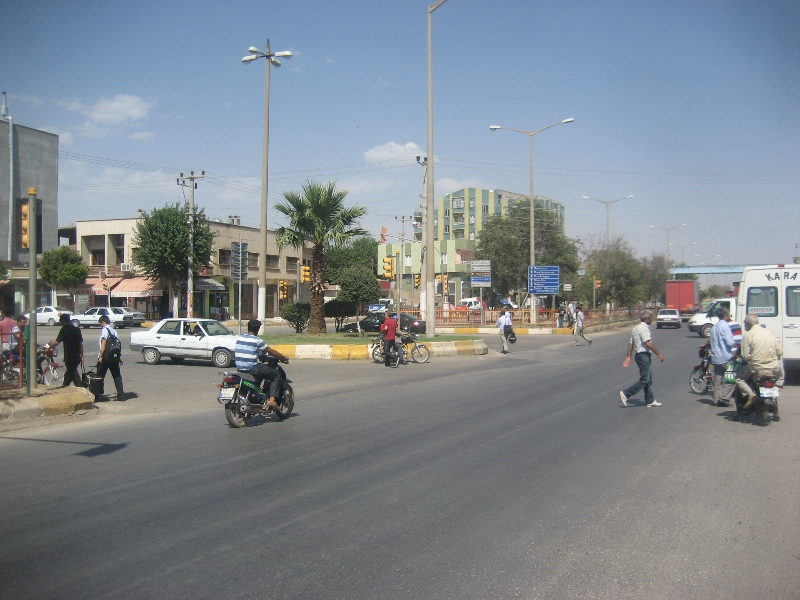
- Mardin-Viranşehir road

- Logo

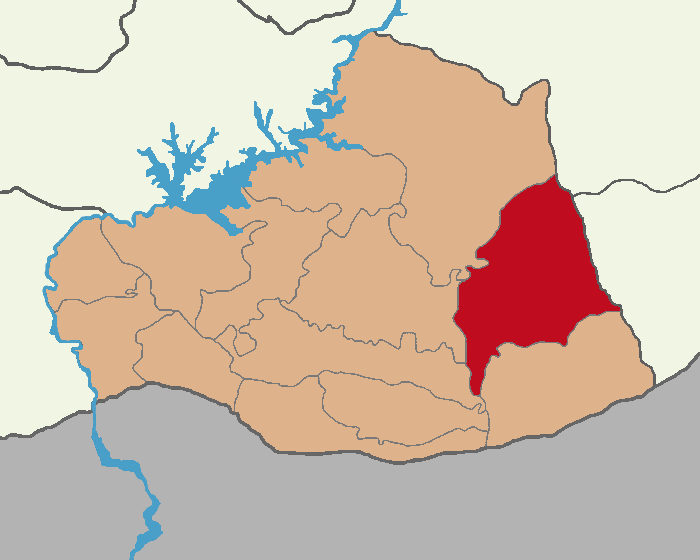
- Map showing Viranşehir District in Şanlıurfa Province

- Location within Turkey Location within Şanlıurfa
- Coordinates: 37°13′50″N 39°45′55″E
- Country: Turkey
- Province: Şanlıurfa

Government
  - Mayor: Serhat Dicle Inan (DEM)
- Area: 2,297 km^{2} (887 sq mi)
- Population (2022): 207,315
  - Density: 90.25/km^{2} (233.8/sq mi)
- Time zone: UTC+3 (TRT)
- Postal code: 63700
- Area code: 0414
- Website: www.viransehir.bel.tr

Viranşehir (Kurdish: Wêranşar) is a municipality and district of Şanlıurfa Province, Turkey. Its area is 2,297 km^{2}, and its population is 207,315 (2022). It is a market town serving a cotton-growing area, 93 km east of the city Şanlıurfa and 53 km north-west of Ceylanpınar at the Syrian border. In Late Antiquity, it was known as Constantina or Constantia (Greek: Κωνσταντίνη) by the Romans and Byzantines, and Tella by the local Assyrian/Syriac population.

== History ==
According to the Byzantine historian John Malalas, the city was built by the Roman Emperor Constantine I on the site of former Maximianopolis, which had been destroyed by a Persian attack and an earthquake. During the next two centuries, it was an important location in the Roman/Byzantine Near East, playing a crucial role in the Roman–Persian Wars of the 6th century as the seat of the dux Mesopotamiae (363–540). It was also a bishopric, suffragan of Edessa. Jacob Baradaeus was born near the city and was a monk in a nearby monastery. The city was captured by the Arabs in 637.

The city became the base for the Ottoman statesman of Kurdish origin Ibrahim Pasha, leader of the Kurdish Milan tribe, in the late nineteenth century. Beginning in 1891, Ibrahim Pasha led several regiments of the state-sponsored tribal light cavalries known as the Hamidiye Brigades. He enjoyed the favor of Sultan Abdul Hamid II, and also extended protection to local Christian populations, with some 600 families taking up residence in the district by the early 1900s. The British spy and diplomat Mark Sykes claimed that Ibrahim Pasha had also saved some 10,000 Christians in the midst of the massacres of the 1890s. The historian Janet Klein writes that "on the eve of the Young Turk Revolution, Ibrahim Pasha was one of the most powerful figures in all of Kurdistan." Yet after the revolution, Ibrahim Pasha could no longer count on the support of the palace. He died on 27 September 1908 of dysentery, hotly pursued by Ottoman troops near Nusaybin.

On the eve of World War I, Viranşehir's Armenian population of numbered 1,339. The city's kaimakam apparently objected to May 1915 orders of raids on the population, but higher-ups eventually prevailed, and the entire population was massacred or sent to Ras al-'Ayn.

== Modern city ==
Historical population
Year	Pop.	±% p.a.
1990	100,361	—
1997	163,975	+7.27%
2007	152,469	−0.72%
2012	172,422	+2.49%
2017	192,966	+2.28%
2022	207,315	+1.44%
Source: 1990 census, 1997 census and TÜIK (2007-2022)

Thanks to the income from cotton, Viranşehir is a fast-growing town.

The Mayor of Viransehir, Leyla Güven, was detained in December 2009 under Turkey's anti-terror legislation. Her trial began on 18 October 2010. She was released in July 2014 with 30 other local elected representatives, after four years of detention. Serhat Dicle Inan from the Peoples' Equality and Democracy Party (DEM) was elected Mayor of Viranşehir in the 31 March 2024 Local Election. The current Kaymakam is Önder Koç.

== Composition ==
There are 148 neighbourhoods in Viranşehir District:

- Abalar
- Adaköy
- Akçataş
- Akkese
- Alakonak
- Altınbaşak
- Anıt
- Arısu
- Arıtır
- Aşağıtınaz
- Aslanbaba
- Atatürk
- Atıcılar
- Ayaklı
- Ayrıdüşen
- Azadi(Evrenpaşa)
- Bahçelievler
- Bakımlı
- Ballıca
- Başaran
- Başköy
- Beğrük
- Binekli
- Bozca
- Burç
- Büyükbardakçı
- Büyükçavuş
- Büyükgörümlü
- Büyükmutlu
- Çalıcık
- Çamurlu
- Ceylan
- Çiftçiler
- Çiftekuyu
- Çokran
- Cumhuriyet
- Dedeköy
- Defterdar
- Değim
- Demirci
- Dikili
- Dinçer
- Dinçkök
- Ekinciler
- Ekindöver
- Elbeğendi
- Elgün
- Emiroğlu
- Engelli
- Eser
- Eskikale
- Eşkin
- Esvetoğlu
- Evcimen
- Eyyüpnebi
- Germen
- Göğerli
- Göktepe
- Gölbaşı
- Gölcük
- Gömülü
- Gönüllü
- Gözeli
- Gözler
- Güleryüz
- Gürpınar
- Güzlek
- Hürriyet
- İncirli
- İsa Harabesi
- Işıldar
- Kadıköy
- Kale
- Karakuzu
- Karataş
- Karatepe
- Kargalı
- Karınca
- Kavurga
- Keçeli
- Kemerli
- Kervansarayı
- Kınalıtepe
- Kırbalı
- Kırkgöz
- Kışla
- Kızlarsarayı
- Kolağası
- Konakyeri
- Koşulu
- Kucak
- Küçükmutlu
- Küçüktopça
- Kumçeşme
- Kurtulmuş
- Kururoğlu
- Malta
- Mehmetçik
- Nergizli
- Oğlakçı
- Övüncük
- Özal
- Pınarlar
- Reyhanlı
- Sağırtaş
- Şahinli
- Sakalar
- Samanlı
- Sarıbal
- Şarkpınar
- Satıcık
- Sayoba
- Şehit
- Selahattinieyyubi
- Sepetli
- Sergen
- Sevgili
- Şırnak
- Sözeri
- Süleymaniye
- Tanyeli
- Taşönü
- Taşyaka
- Tekke
- Tekneli
- Tepedüzü
- Toklu
- Tunçbilek
- Türkeli
- Üçgül
- Uğurlu
- Ulaklı
- Yaban
- Yağızlar
- Yarpuz
- Yayık
- Yazgüneşi
- Yeni
- Yenişehir
- Yeşilalıç
- Yeşildurak
- Yıldız
- Yolbilen
- Yollarbaşı
- Yüceler
- Yukarıbağ
- Yukarıdilimli
- Yukarışölenli

== Notable people ==
- Jacob Baradaeus (c. 500–578), Bishop of Edessa
- Ibrahim Pasha Milli (1843-1908), Kurdish chief
- Bilge Özgen (1935*), musical Artist
- Şivan Perwer (1955*), musical Artist
- Nureddin Nebati (1964*), politician
- Ayşe Sürücü (1983*), politician
- Semra Güzel (1984*), medical doctor and a politician
- Deniz Kadah (1986*), footballer
- Dilan Kunt Ayan (1989*), politician
- Deniz Undav (1996*), footballer
