= Hamidiye (cavalry) =

1890–1908 Ottoman irregular cavalry regiment

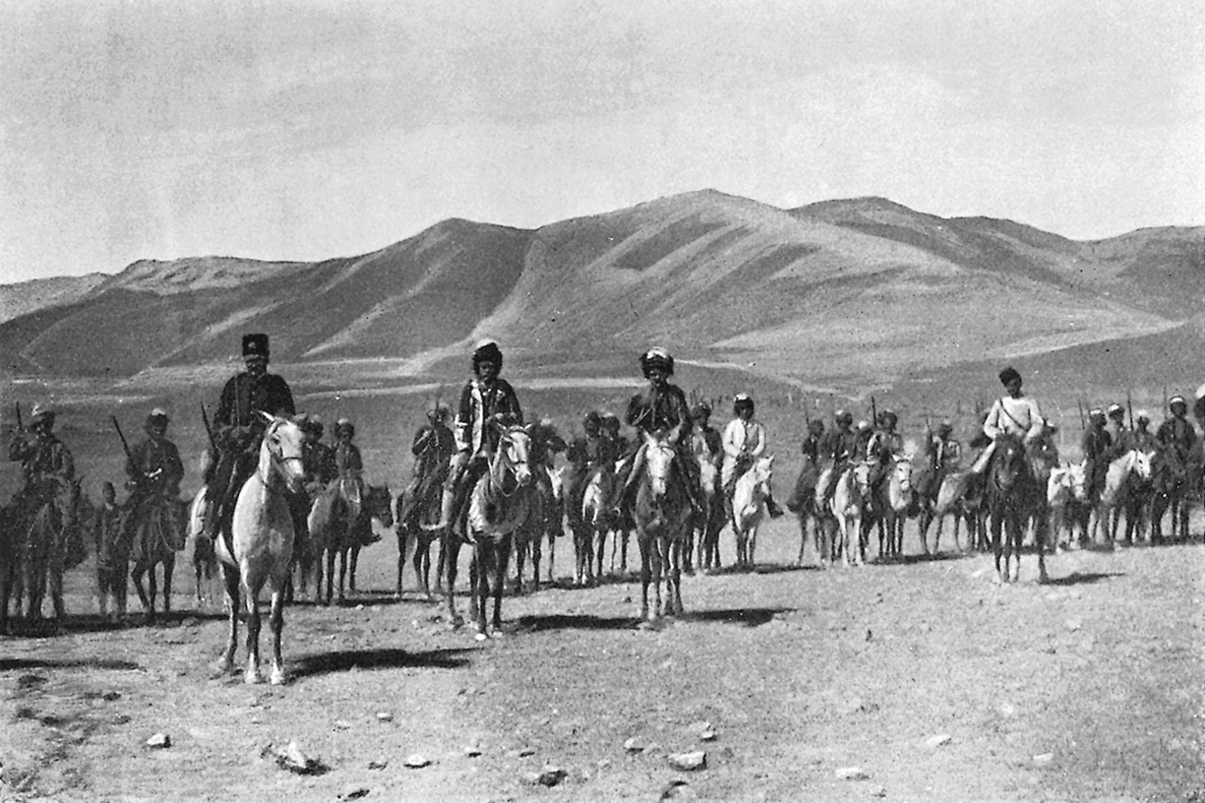
- Hamidiye Cavalry
- Active: 1890–1908
- Country: Ottoman Empire
- Branch: Ottoman Army
- Type: Cavalry
- Size: 16,500+ in 1892.

Commanders
- Notable commanders: Zeki Pasha, Ibrahim Pasha Milli

The Hamidiye regiments (literally meaning "belonging to Hamid", full official name Hamidiye Hafif Süvari Alayları, Hamidiye Light Cavalry Regiments) were well-armed, irregular, mainly Sunni Kurdish but also Turkish, Circassian, Turkmen, Yörük, and Arab cavalry formations that operated in the southeastern provinces of the Ottoman Empire. Established in 1891 by Sultan Abdul Hamid II and named after him, the regiments were intended to be modeled after the Cossacks and were supposedly tasked with patrolling the Russo–Ottoman frontier. However, the Hamidiye regiments were frequently used by the Ottoman authorities to harass and assault Armenians living in the eastern provinces of the Ottoman Empire (Western Armenia in some sources).

A major role in the Hamidian massacres of 1894–1896 has been often ascribed to the Hamidiye regiments, particularly during the bloody suppression of the revolt of the Armenians of Sasun (1894).

After Sultan Abdul Hamid II's reign, the cavalry was not dissolved but given a new name: the Tribal Light Cavalry Regiments.

Although initially envisioned as a modernizing step in tribal-military integration, the Hamidiye regiments often became a source of tension. Their semi-autonomous status led to frequent clashes with rival tribes and conflicts with local populations. While the regiments were disbanded during the early years of the Young Turk period (post-1908), their legacy influenced later Kurdish tribal politics and paramilitary models.

The Hamidiye operated mostly in the provinces of Erzurum, Van, Bitlis, Diyarbakır, and Mosul.

== Historical background ==
Sultan Abdul Hamid II's reign has the reputation of being "the most despotic and centralized era in modern Ottoman History". Sultan Abdul Hamid II is also considered the last sultan to have full control over the territories of the Ottoman Empire. His reign struggled with the culmination of 75 years of change throughout the empire and an opposing reaction to that change. Abdul Hamid II was particularly concerned with the centralization of the empire. His efforts to centralize the Sublime Porte were not unheard of among other sultans. The Ottoman Empire's local provinces had more control over their areas than the central government. Sultan Abdul Hamid II's foreign relations came from a "policy of non-commitment." The sultan understood the fragility of the Ottoman military, and the Empire's weaknesses of its domestic control. Pan-Islamism became Sultan Abdülhamid's solution to the empire's loss of identity and power. His efforts to promote Pan-Islamism were for the most part unsuccessful because of the large non-Muslim population, and the European influence onto the empire. Abdul Hamid II's policies essentially isolated the Ottoman Empire, which further aided in its decline. Several of the elite who sought a new constitution and reform for the empire were forced to flee to Europe. After the Treaty of Berlin (1878), the Ottoman Empire began to contract and it lost certain territories. New groups of radical uprisings began to threaten the power of the Ottoman Empire.

== Creation of Hamidiye cavalry ==
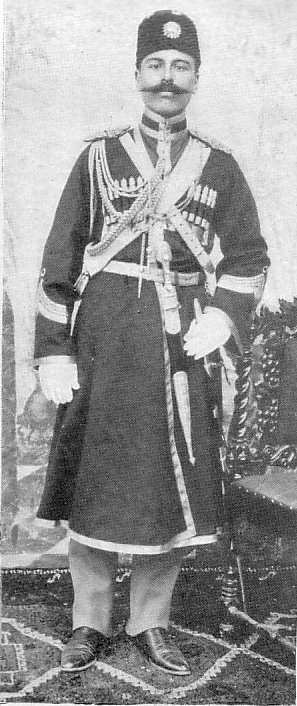
Kurdish Hamidiye officer

The Hamidiye regiments were established in 1891 following a decree published in November 1890. There are several reasons advanced as to why the Hamidiye light cavalry was created. The establishment of the Hamidiye was in one part a response to the Russian threat, although some scholars believe that the central reason was to suppress Armenian socialist/nationalist revolutionaries. After the Russo-Ottoman war in 1877-1878 the six eastern provinces were left under the control of several non-state actors with spheres of interest of Kurdish tribes and Armenian revolutionaries. The Armenian revolutionaries posed a threat because they were seen as disruptive, and they could work with the Russians against the Ottoman Empire. The first Armenian revolutionary party was the Social Democrat Hunchakian Party. The Social Democrat Hunchakian Party was made up of Armenian university students whose aim was "to create an independent Armenian state." The Hamidiye Light Cavalry was created to "combat local and cross-border challenges to Ottoman authority." The biggest patron of the Hamidiye was Abdul Hamid II. They were named after him and under the direct order of him and his brother-in-law Zeki Pasha, the Circassian commander of the 4th Army based in Erzincan. Zeki Pasha was given the task of collecting sufficient taxes in order to recruit Kurds into the Hamidiye. If one was a member of the Hamidiye and a crime was committed against him, the government would take immediate action to punish the criminals. The plunder, murder, and theft that the Hamidiye carried out went unpunished, but if a non-Hamidiye group did similar actions they were punished. Other groups who associated themselves with the Hamidiye received benefits as well, they rose in power with the money and land they acquired illegally. Abdul Hamid II. wanted to create a relationship of commitment and loyalty with the Kurds that were chosen to make up the Hamidiye cavalry. The Hamidiye was divided into groups according to age: the ibtidaiye (ages 17–20), the nizamiye (age 20–32), and the redif (age 32–40). An Ottoman diplomat, close advisor to the sultan, and contributor to the creation of the Hamidiye Light Cavalry was Şakir Pasa, was put in charge of the Hamidiye following the massacres against Armenians in 1895–1896. The Kurdish Hamidiye commanders were given exceptional rights to negotiate with the Sultan. Notable commanders were Ibrahim Pasha, Hacı Musa Beg or Kör Hüseyin Pasha. Over time the Russians forged relationships with Armenian revolutionaries, and with Kurdish tribal leaders.

The Ottoman Empire understood the threat this created and is in large part why they chose the Kurds to make-up the Hamidiye. The Kurdish population could potentially unite with the Russians, but with the formation of the Hamidiye they would protect the frontiers of the Ottoman Empire. Some argue that the creation of the Hamidiye "further antagonized the Armenian population" and it worsened the very conflict they were created to prevent.

The Hamidiye shaped the "social, economic, and political transformations" in Kurdish societies. The Hamidiye received several benefits for their participation. They were able to seize much of the lands they occupied, whether lawful or not. The Hamidiye were protected during their annual migrations (periods when they took care of their livestock). They were supplied with the most advanced weapons from the state, and were given armed escorts. The Hamidiye stole money from the villages they plundered without fear of government sanction. The plunder, murder, and theft that the Hamidiye carried out went unpunished, but if a non-Hamidiye group did similar actions they were punished. Other groups who associated themselves with the Hamidiye received benefits as well, they rose in power with the money and land they acquired illegally.

The Hamidiye were not held responsible for their actions. They were assured freedom of action in raids that involved non-Hamidiye parties. The Hamidiye obtained wealth illegally with secret help from the Ottoman government. The corruption, chaos, and destruction caused by the Hamidiye is a direct cause of their lack of order and control. No guidelines in the Hamidiye cavalry led some of its members to not be a part of the indulgences that came with the corruption. Ottoman soldiers described the some Hamidiye as "miserable, hungry, and sometimes poorly clothed." The Hamidiye's performance was due to their "lack of professionalism superimposed on an emotionally charged mission requiring highly disciplined troops." The cavalry was not prepared for all they were intended to do because they were not trained properly and based their raids on anti-Armenian ideologies. These factors led to the slow disintegration of the Hamidiye.

== Armenian and Assyrian genocide ==
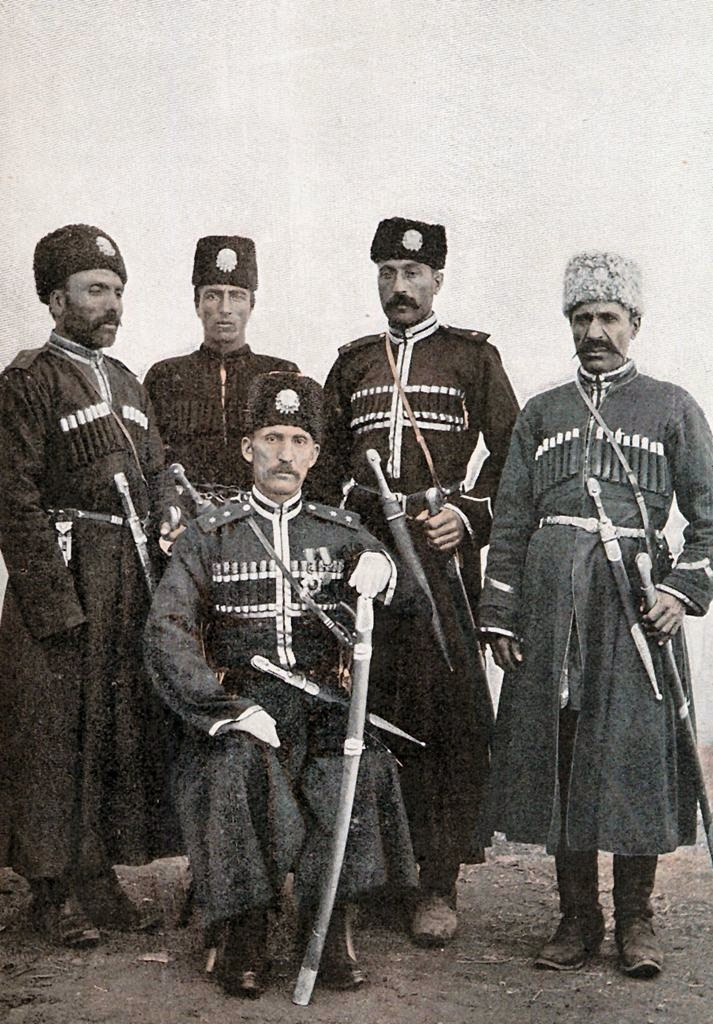
Officers of the Karapapakh Hamidiye cavalry

The Hamidiye played a significant role in the Armenian genocide and largely responsible for the Hamidian massacres that occurred from 1894 to 1896. They were told to take control of many lands populated by Armenians to weaken "internal enemies" along with the hidden agenda of eventually eliminating the Armenians. Regions with high Armenian revolutionary actions were targets for the Hamidiye. The Hamidiye created an "Armenian Conspiracy" to justify their reasons for killing the Armenians.

According to some estimates, about ten to twenty thousand Armenians were slaughtered by the Hamidiye units. According to Janet Klein, Hamidiye units were involved in the large scale massacres and violence against Armenians in the period 1894-96 and 1915, and they were also "implicated in mass murder, deportation and looting" during the First World War.

According to Richar G. Hovannisian, an Armenian-American, the Ottoman armed forces and Hamidiye units slaughtered Assyrians in the Tur Abdin region in 1915. It is estimated that ten thousand Assyrians were killed, and according to a document from the same years, "the skulls of small children were smashed with rocks, the bodies of girls and women who resisted rape were chopped into pieces live, men were mostly beheaded, and the clergy skinned or burnt alive".

== Uniforms ==
The uniform ranking system was based on the 1861 patterns of cuff chevrons. Several ceremonies took place for the Hamidiye, where they wore elegant uniforms showing their ranks and accomplishments. The new uniforms were to take the place of the colorful uniforms previously worn by the Kurds. Its purpose was to create an identity for the Hamidiye who were spread across the frontiers of the empire. Other than this, the Ottoman army was greatly influenced by the Circassians. They wore cherkeska and they were armed with shashka Circassian swords and Caucasian dagger. They sometimes consisted of grey tunics or waist-belts, grey trousers with a narrow red stripe, and kalpak with the imperial arms. The uniforms slightly varied depending on the region the Hamidiye was located.

== Units ==
The Hamidiye regiments were stationed in the following towns and villages:

Number	Group or tribe	Place	Cavalry	Infantry	Total
1	Sipkân	Dutak	400	250	650
2	Sipkân	Hosuna	400	175	575
3	Sipkân	Cemal Verdi	400	225	625
4	Zilan	Toprakkale	250	360	610
5	Zilan	Karakilise	450	250	700
6	Karapapak	Eleşkirt and Karakilise	400	150	650
7	Terekeme	Tutak - Karakilise	300	200	500
8	Keşvan	Hasankale	200	175	475
9	Şapikan and Badayan	Kızıldiz	250	325	575
10	Taşkesen, Diyadin	Kasatkanlı	198	350	548
11	Mikaili	Karakilise, Diyadin	175	325	500
12	Hamdiki, Başımi, Hal Hesini	Karakilise, Diyadin	225	350	525
13	Haydaran	Bergiri (Muradiye)	200	318	518
14	Haydaran	Bergiri (Muradiye)	175	350	525
15	Şevli	Van, Timar	200	350	550
16	Kalıkan, Livi	Erciş	255	270	525
17	Mukuri	Saray	215	315	530
18	Takari	Zermaniz, Saray	300	380	680
19	Milli, Şemsiki	Saray	225	425	650
20	Şkeftka	Eblak	327	213	540
21	Adaman, Zilan, Hecidıran	Erciş	250	275	525
22	Haydaran	Erciş	175	350	525
23	Haydaran	Adilcevaz	200	350	550
24	Heydaran	Erciş	175	350	525
25	Marhoran	Adilcevaz	250	300	550
26	Hasenan	Hınıs (Kumdeban)	335	205	540
27	Hasenan	Malazgirt	340	200	540
28	Hasenan	Malazgirt (Diknuk, Dinbut)	304	230	534
29	Hasenan	Moranköyü	310	230	540
30	Hasenan	Bulanık	308	232	540
31	Cibran	Gümgüm	308	232	540
32	Cibran	Hınıs	310	235	545
33	Cibran	Varto	315	330	545
34	Zirkan	Hınıs	300	250	550
35	Zirkan	Hınıs (Halilçavuş)	375	500	875
36	Cibran	Kiğı	285	265	550
37	Jalali	Bayezit (Örtülü kışlağı)	305	370	540
38	Celali	Bayezit (Şeyhlu kışlağı)	300	240	540
39	Takori	Mahmudiye (Saray)	305	301	606
40	Caucasian muhajirs	Sivas	275	500	775
41	Milli	Mardin	275	265	540
42	Milli	Siverek	255	375	630
43	Milli	Siverek	303	247	550
44	Karakeçi	Siverek	305	225	530
45	Kikan	Ra's al-'Ayn, Mardin	350	270	620
46	Tayy	Nusaybin	445	185	630
47	Karakeçi	Siverek	310	230	540
48	Miran	Cezire	335	205	540
49	Miran	Cezire	308	232	540
50	Ertoşi	Elbak	375	300	625
51	Kays	Urfa	450	200	650
52	Kays	Harran	400	150	550
53	Berazı	Urfa	250	300	550
54	Berazı	Urfa	300	300	600
55	Berazı	Urfa	275	300	575
56	Gevdan	Hakkari	200	300	500
57	Şadili	Hasankale	300	250	550
58	Adaman	Erciş	200	350	550
59	Pinyan	Hakkari	150	400	550
60	Şidan	Hakkari	350	300	650
61	Kasıkan	Söylemez	250	300	550
62	Kiki	Harran	250	350	600
63	Milli	Viranşehir	550	250	800
64	Milli	Viranşehir	600	225	825
65	Belideyi	Erciş, Patnos, Malazgirt	250	200	450

== Bibliography ==
- Klein, Janet. The Margins of Empire: Kurdish Militias in the Ottoman Tribal Zone. Stanford: Stanford University Press, 2011.
- Klein Janet, Joost Jongerden, Jelle Verheij, Social Relations in Ottoman Diyarbekir, 1870-1975. Koninklijke Brill NV, Leidin, Netherlands, 2012
- Edward J. Erickson, Defeat in Detail: The Ottoman Army in the Balkans, 1912-1913. 2003
