= Semra, Bhopal =

Semra
- village
- Location within Madhya Pradesh Location within India
- Coordinates: 23.732047°N 77.396842°E
- Country: India
- State: Madhya Pradesh
- District: Bhopal
- Tehsil: Berasia

Population (2011)
  - Total: 516
- Time zone: UTC+5:30 (IST)
- ISO 3166 code: MP-IN
- Census code: 482134

Semra is a village in the Bhopal district of Madhya Pradesh, India. It is located in the Berasia tehsil.

== Demographics ==
According to the 2011 census of India, Semra has 100 households. The effective literacy rate (i.e. the literacy rate of population excluding children aged 6 and below) is 68.18%.

Demographics (2011 Census)
	Total	Male	Female
Population	516	284	232
Children aged below 6 years	76	42	34
Scheduled caste	55	31	24
Scheduled tribe	42	20	22
Literates	300	202	98
Workers (all)	129	119	10
Main workers (total)	111	105	6
Main workers: Cultivators	78	72	6
Main workers: Agricultural labourers	33	33	0
Main workers: Household industry workers	0	0	0
Main workers: Other	0	0	0
Marginal workers (total)	18	14	4
Marginal workers: Cultivators	0	0	0
Marginal workers: Agricultural labourers	11	9	2
Marginal workers: Household industry workers	7	5	2
Marginal workers: Others	0	0	0
Non-workers	387	165	222
