= Ülkü Azrak =

Turkish lawyer and academic (1933–2020)

- Born: Ali Ülkü Azrak; 24 July 1933; Istanbul, Turkey
- Died: 15 April 2020 (aged 86); Istanbul, Turkey
- Education: Istanbul University (BS, 1956); Istanbul University (PhD, 1970)
- Occupations: Lawyer, academic
- Title: Professor Doctor
- Spouse: Hannelore Azrak
- Children: 2

Ali Ülkü Azrak (24 July 1933 – 15 April 2020) was a Turkish lawyer and academic.

== Personal life ==
He had two sons from his marriage to Hannelore Azrak, who was of German origin. He spent the majority of his time between Turkey and Germany. Their children Deniz and Attila live in Germany.

== Career ==
=== Academic ===
Azrak graduated from Vefa High School as a top student. He later graduated from Istanbul University School of Law in 1956. He started to work as an assistant in Istanbul University in 1958. He became "Associate Professor" in 1970. In 1971, he started to work as an "Associate Professor" at Istanbul University School of Law - Administrative Law department and continued this duty until 1979. In 1979, he was among the people who founded the Istanbul University School of Political Sciences. He became a "Professor" in 1982 and continued his career as a lecturer until 2000 when he retired from Istanbul University, School of Political Sciences, Department of Management. He lectured at the Istanbul Academy of Economic and Commercial Sciences and Marmara University between 1972 and 1985. In 1988, he became the Head of Management Sciences Department.

He served as the Head of Istanbul University Institute of Social Sciences between 1994 and 1999, as Dean of Istanbul University Faculty of Political Sciences between 1995 and 1998, and as Head of Public Administration Department of Istanbul University Faculty of Political Sciences between 1998 and 1999. In 1999, he resigned from both his positions as head of the Social Sciences Institute and head of the Department of Public Administration and relinquished membership of the Senate after running into problems with Kemal Alemdaroğlu, the rector of Istanbul University at the time. He retired in 2000, but later started to work as a lecturer at Maltepe University School of Law. He left there in 2009 and returned to Istanbul University. Between 2001 and 2005, he served as a member of the Council of Higher Education after being appointed by President Ahmet Necdet Sezer.

=== Other sectors ===
Between 1994 and 1999 he was made the deputy chairman of the Touring and Automobile Club of Turkey. Between 2001 and 2003, he was a member of the Turkey Bar Association's Human Rights Advisory Board. He also served as the President of the Turkish-German Cultural Association and a member of the German-Turkish Public Law Platform. He also took part in the Advisory Board of the Union of Historic Cities.

== Awards ==
He was awarded the Order of Merit of the Federal Republic of Germany on 29 November 2007.

== Death ==
Azrak died at the Florence Nightingale Hospital on 15 April 2020, from complications of COVID-19 during the disease's pandemic. 10 days before his death, his German-born wife Hannelore Azrak had died from the same disease.
