= Naim Uludoğan =

Turkish artist, sculptor and cartographic officer

- Born: 1911; Shkodër, Ottoman Empire
- Died: 18 December 2010 (aged 98–99); Istanbul, Turkey
- Occupations: Cartographic officer, artist
- Years active: 1933–2000
- Spouse: Nusret Uludoğan
- Children: Ülkü Uludoğan

Naim Uludoğan (1911 – 18 December 2010) was a Turkish artist, sculptor and cartographic officer. Born in Shkodër, then part of the Ottoman Empire, he and his family migrated to Istanbul in the immediate aftermath of the First Balkan War. He graduated from the Kuleli Military High School and Harbiye War Academy (1933) as an Infantry officer during the period of 1926–34. At Kuleli, he received regular instructions from Sami Yetik, a well known Turkish artist.

In 1947, Uludoğan became a member of the Military Artists Association. He later graduated from Gazi University and was certified for instructing art and painting. He instructed in various military educational institutions until 1955, when he retired from the army with the rank of major.

Uludoğan also held two joint father-daughter painting exhibitions with Ülkü Uludoğan, first in 1965 and secondly in 1991 that toured various Turkish cities and Kassel, Germany. In 1984 he was awarded the Service Plaque for his contributions to the Turkish culture and art by the Turkish ministry of culture and tourism. In 1988 he was also awarded the 50 Year Service to Art plaque by the Istanbul Municipality. As of 1997, he had held 28 solo exhibitions.

== Prizes and awards ==
- 1952 – 2nd place in Konya municipality painting competition
- 1982 – 3rd place in the Turkish Petroleum 2nd Atatürk Painting Competition
- 1984 – Award from the Turkish Ministry of Culture and Tourism for his service to Turkish art
- 1988 – 50 years of service to art by Istanbul Municipality
- 1991 – the OYAK plaque
- 1991 – Plaque by GESAM (Turkish Association of Fine Arts) for contrition to Turkish culture and art.
- 1991 – Honor award by the Association of Plastic Arts
- 2010 – Plaque of gratitude over his contribution in fine arts in the honor of his 100th birthday
