= Semra, Gopalganj =

Semra
- village
- Location in Bihar, India Semra (India)
- Coordinates: 26°29′36″N 84°08′26″E
- Country: India
- State: Bihar
- District: Gopalganj

Area
  - Total: 1.77 km^{2} (0.68 sq mi)

Population (2011)
  - Total: 5,247
  - Density: 2,960/km^{2} (7,680/sq mi)

Languages
  - Official: Bhojpuri, Hindi, English
- Time zone: UTC+5:30 (IST)
- PIN: 841440
- Telephone code: 06156
- ISO 3166 code: IN-BR
- Nearest city: Thawe
- Literacy: 76.74%
- Lok Sabha constituency: Gopalganj

Semra is a village panchayat in Gopalganj district of the Indian state of Bihar.

The village is renowned for its Madarsa Islamiya Ahsaniya, a prominent educational institution. Ramjanki and Kali Maa temples are significant places of worship. This village is known as the Engineers and Teachers Village. Its now engineers village.

== Geography ==
Semra is situated in the Thawe block of Gopalganj district. It is 3 km from the sub-district headquarters in Thawe, 3 km from the district headquarters in Gopalganj.

== Demographics ==
As of the 2011 Census, Semra had a population of 5,247 people. The male population is 2,798 and the female population is 2,449.The literacy rate in Semra is 76.74%, with male literacy at 85.99% and female literacy at 65.94%. The village spans 177 hectares, resulting in a population density of 30 people per hectare.

Engineers, doctors, advocates, service members, judges and teachers contribute to the educational and professional landscape.

== Economy ==
The primary occupation in Semra is agriculture, mainly paddy. The village has significant numbers of engineers and teachers.

== Infrastructure ==
Semra has basic infrastructure such as roads connecting it to nearby towns including Thawe, Gopalganj, and Mirganj. The village has educational institutions, including primary and secondary schools. Healthcare services are available at nearby government health centers and a few private ones.

== Culture ==
Semra is known for its religious sites, including the Madarsa Islamiya Ahsaniya, also known as Muslim Education Point, and Ramjanki and Kali Maa temples. The village is in close proximity to the famous Thawe Wali Bhawani Maa temple, a major pilgrimage site.
