= Governor of Şanlıurfa =

Governor of a Turkish Province

Governor of Şanlıurfa Şanlıurfa Valiliği
- Logo of the Governor of Şanlıurfa
- Incumbent; Hasan Şıldak since August 18, 2023
- Appointer: President of Turkey; On the recommendation of the Turkish government
- Term length: No set term length or limit
- Inaugural holder: Abdülkerim Bey; August 1, 1910
- Website: Office of the Governor

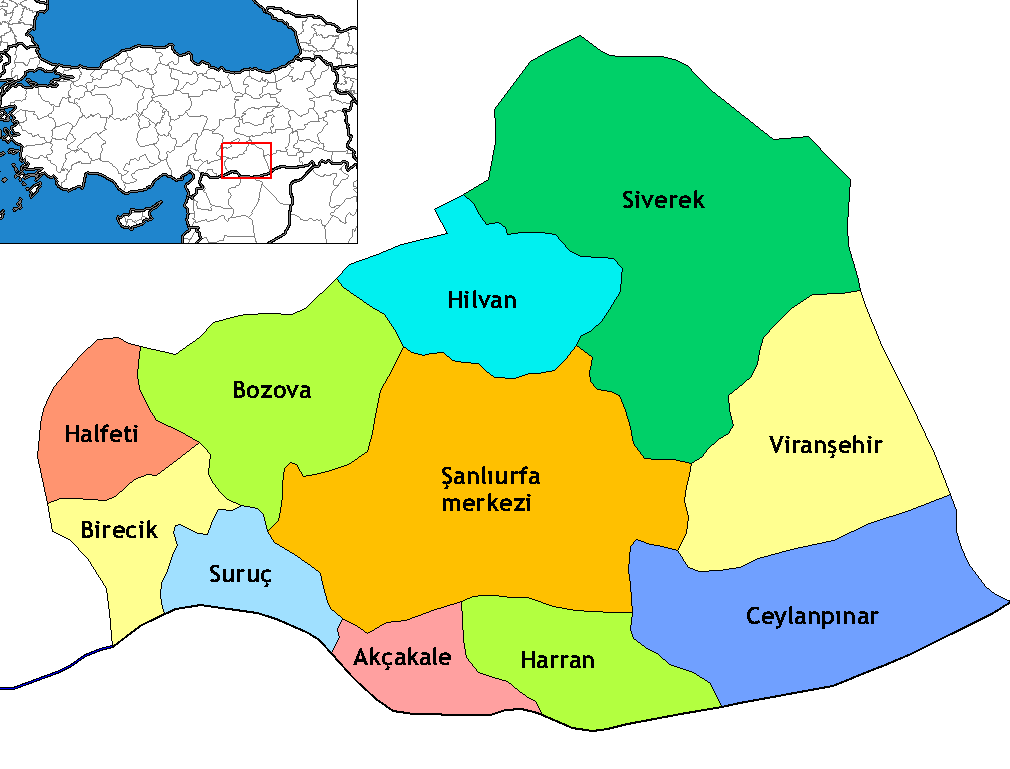
Map of the Province of Şanlıurfa, showing the provincial districts.

The Governor of Şanlıurfa (Turkish: Şanlıurfa Valiliği) is the bureaucratic state official responsible for both national government and state affairs in the Province of Şanlıurfa. Similar to the Governors of the 80 other Provinces of Turkey, the Governor of Şanlıurfa is appointed by the Government of Turkey and is responsible for the implementation of government legislation within Şanlıurfa. The Governor is also the most senior commander of both the Şanlıurfa provincial police force and the Şanlıurfa Gendarmerie.

== Appointment ==
The Governor of Şanlıurfa is appointed by the President of Turkey, who confirms the appointment after recommendation from the Turkish Government. The Ministry of the Interior first considers and puts forward possible candidates for approval by the cabinet. The Governor of Şanlıurfa is therefore not a directly elected position and instead functions as the most senior civil servant in the Province of Şanlıurfa.

=== Term limits ===
The Governor is not limited by any term limits and does not serve for a set length of time. Instead, the Governor serves at the pleasure of the Government, which can appoint or reposition the Governor whenever it sees fit. Such decisions are again made by the cabinet of Turkey. The Governor of Şanlıurfa, as a civil servant, may not have any close connections or prior experience in Şanlıurfa Province. It is not unusual for Governors to alternate between several different Provinces during their bureaucratic career.

== Functions ==
The Governor of Şanlıurfa has both bureaucratic functions and influence over local government. The main role of the Governor is to oversee the implementation of decisions by government ministries, constitutional requirements and legislation passed by Grand National Assembly within the provincial borders. The Governor also has the power to reassign, remove or appoint officials a certain number of public offices and has the right to alter the role of certain public institutions if they see fit. Governors are also the most senior public official within the Province, meaning that they preside over any public ceremonies or provincial celebrations being held due to a national holiday. As the commander of the provincial police and Gendarmerie forces, the Governor can also take decisions designed to limit civil disobedience and preserve public order. Although mayors of municipalities and councillors are elected during local elections, the Governor has the right to re-organise or to inspect the proceedings of local government despite being an unelected position.

== List of governors of Şanlıurfa ==
- Fuat Baturay (1923–1924)
- Feyyaz Bosut (1924–1927)
- Ali Rıza Ceylan (1927–1930)
- İbrahim Hazım Mat (1930–1932)
- Mithat Kalabalık (1932–1935)
- Atıf Ulusoğlu (1935–1938)
- Hasan Basri Özdenkçi (1939–1941)
- Ziya Termen (1941–1943)
- Recai Türeli (1943–1945)
- Hamza Kişioğlu (1945–1946)
- Kâmuran Çuhruk (1946–1948)
- Ahmet Demir (1948–1950)
- Fevzi Karakülah (1950–1951)
- Sait Kemalî Atay (1951–1953)
- Hadi Ömür (1953–1954)
- Eşref Ayhan (1954–1955)
- Niyazi Akı (1955–1958)
- Sadık Erdem (1958–1960)
- Şeref Tolungüç (1960)
- Altay Kışlalı (1960–1962)
- Nail Memik (1962–1964)
- Celal Coşkun (1964–1966)
- Ali Rıza Yaradanakul (1966–1968)
- Mustafa Yörükoğlu (1968–1970)
- Nazım Kemal Diniz (1970–1971)
- Fikret Turgut Sayın (1971–1975)
- Galip Demirel (1975–1976)
- Rafet Üçelli (1976–1978)
- Kadir Demir (1978–1979)
- Ziya Çoker (1979–1980)
- Fikret Koçak (1980–1981)
- Rıdvan Yenişen (1981–1984)
- Alpaslan Karacan (1984–1988)
- Ziyaeddin Akbulut (1988–1991)
- Tevfik Ziyaeddin Akbulut (1991–1992)
- Yusuf Yavaşcan (1992–1996)
- Şahabettin Harput (1996–2000)
- Muzaffer Ecemiş (2000–2003)
- Şükrü Kocatepe (2003–2006)
- Yusuf Yavaşcan (2006–2009)
- Nuri Okutan (2009–2011)
- Celalettin Güvenç (2011–2013)
- İzzettin Küçük (2014–2016)
- Güngör Azim Tuna (2016–2017)
- Abdullah Erin (2017–2022)
- Salih Ayhan (2022–2023)
- Hasan Şıldak (2023–)

== See also ==
- Governor (Turkey)
- Şanlıurfa Province
- Ministry of the Interior (Turkey)
