= Ülkü Uludoğan =

Turkish artist (born 1940)

- Born: 1940 (age 84–85); Ankara
- Occupation: Artist
- Parents: Naim Uludoğan (father); Nusret Uludoğan (mother)

Ülkü Uludoğan (born 1940, Ankara) is a Turkish artist. She received her first art lessons from her father Naim Uludoğan. She graduated from Mimar Sinan Fine Arts University in Istanbul, and has also taken art and painting lessons from Nurullah Berk and Neşet Günal. She continued art studies with Abidin Elderoğlu in Ankara and Werner Kausch in Germany, and graduated from the University of Kassel.

Uludoğan was a culture & art consultant to the Destek Reasürans Art Gallery of Türkiye İş Bankası for 8 years. She is one of the main founders of Women Artists' Society of Ankara.

Her paintings are exhibited in the State Art and Sculpture Museum (Ankara), Hessian State Museum, Kassel and various state and private galleries and collections.

Uludoğan has held seventeen solo exhibitions as well as various mixed painting exhibitions in Turkey and in Germany, Belgium, Spain, France, and Jordan. She also held two joint father-daughter painting exhibitions with Naim Uludoğan, first in 1965, and secondly in 1991 that toured various Turkish cities and Kassel, Germany.

== Prizes and awards ==
- 1972 – Received an Honorable Mention of Ankara Art Magazine with her water color portrait
- 1976 – UFACSI (Union Féminine Artistique et Culturelle) 15 person special group award
- 1988 – 30-Year Service to Turkish Art award by prime minister Turgut Özal on behalf of the “Türk Kadınını Güçlendirme Vakfı”
- 1989 – The order of l’Ard de Leonardo da Vinci by the Cordon Bleu du Saint Esprit
- 1989 – Order of the Knight of Cordon Blue
- 1989 – Diploma of “Professeur h.c. ” by Parthasarathy International Cultural Academy (PICA, Mandras, India)
- 1990 – Bronze medal of “Gran Premio Goya Atribuido” and the Diploma by Asociacion Belgo-Hispanica ASBL, Spain
