= Semra Kebede =

Actress and Model

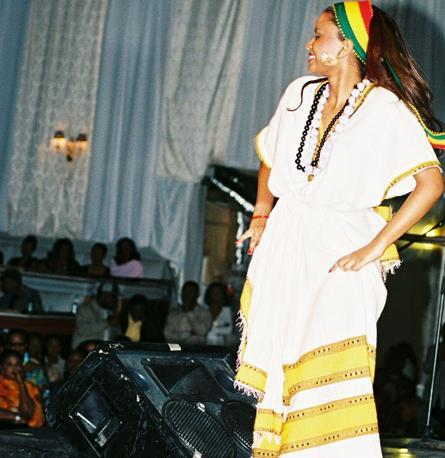
- Kebede at Miss Africa USA Pageant
- Born: Semra Kebede; Addis Ababa, Ethiopia
- Education: Economics, Emory University
- Alma mater: Emory University
- Occupations: beauty pageant titleholder, model, and actress

Semra Kebede is an Ethiopian beauty pageant titleholder, model, and actress, who was crowned Miss Ethiopia USA and later Deputy Miss Africa USA .

== Titles ==
Semra was crowned Miss Ethiopia USA at the official Miss Ethiopia USA pageant. This win qualified her to compete and represent her country of Ethiopia in the Miss Africa USA pageant and she later was crowned Deputy Miss Africa USA.

== Modeling ==
Semra has participated in fashion shows for designers such as the Ethiopian musician and designer Chachi Tadesse and Ras Judah designer Rozy Negusie. She has also appeared in print for the latter designer as well as for other Ethiopian beauty products.
