= Semra Ülkü =

Turkish educator

- Occupation: Professor at İYTE
- Website: iyte.edu.tr/~semraulku

Prof. Dr. Semra Ülkü is a Turkish educator and university administrator who served for eight years (1998–2006) as the rector of the İzmir Institute of Technology. She was the second academic to serve in the institution's top position since its founding in 1992.

Semra Ülkü received her degrees in chemical engineering from Ankara's Middle East Technical University (B.Sc., 1969, M.Sc., 1971 and Ph.D., 1975). Among her research writings, which have been published in a number of scientific journals, are:

- Evren Altıok; Deniz Bayçın; Oguz Bayraktar; Semra Ülkü (September 2008). "Isolation of polyphenols from the extracts of olive leaves (Olea europaea L.) by adsorption on silk fibroin". Separation and Purification Technology. 62 (2): 342–348. doi:10.1016/j.seppur.2008.01.022. hdl:11147/2155.
- Fehime Cakicioglu-Ozkan; Semra Ulku (January 2005). "The effect of HCl treatment on water vapor adsorption characteristics of clinoptilolite rich natural zeolite". Microporous and Mesoporous Materials. 77 (1): 47–53. doi:10.1016/j.micromeso.2004.08.013. hdl:11147/1997.
- Ayben Top; Semra Ülkü (October 2004). "Silver, zinc, and copper exchange in a Na-clinoptilolite and resulting effect on antibacterial activity". Applied Clay Science. 27 (1–2): 13–19. doi:10.1016/j.clay.2003.12.002. hdl:11147/4734.
- Devrim Balköse; Sevgi Ulutan; Fehime Çakıcıoglu Özkan; Sedat Çelebi; Semra Ülkü (September 1998). "Dynamics of water vapor adsorption on humidity-indicating silica gel". Applied Surface Science. 134 (1–4): 39–46. doi:10.1016/S0169-4332(98)00244-X. hdl:11147/4508.
- Semra Ülkü (1993). "Novel Application of Adsorption: Energy Recovery". Fundamentals of Adsorption, Proceedings of the Fourth International Conference on Fundamentals of Adsorption. Vol. 80. pp. 685–693. doi:10.1016/S0167-2991(08)63577-6. ISBN 9780444986580.
- Semra Ülkü; Moghtada Mobedi (1989). Zeolites in Heat Recovery. Vol. 49. pp. 511–518. doi:10.1016/S0167-2991(08)61748-6. ISBN 9780444874665.
- Semra Ülkü (1986). "Adsorption heat pumps". Journal of Heat Recovery Systems. 6 (4): 277–284. doi:10.1016/0198-7593(86)90113-X.
