= Alemayo Kebede =

Eritrean footballer

Personal information
- Full name: Alemayo Kebede Ayele
- Date of birth: 10 April 1987 (age 39)
- Place of birth: Asmara, Ethiopia
- Position: Attacking midfielder

Youth career
- Red Sea FC

Senior career*
Years	Team	Apps	(Gls)
????–2009	Red Sea FC	?	(?)
2011–2013	Croydon Kings	36	(9)
2013–2014	Adelaide Raiders	24	(13)
2014	Western Strikers	14	(5)
2014–2016	Adelaide Blue Eagles	68	(17)
2017	Adelaide Olympic	9	(0)
2017–2020	Adelaide Blue Eagles	60	(12)

International career^{‡}
–2009	Eritrea	?	(?)
- * Club domestic league appearances and goals as of 4 November 2020 ‡ National team caps and goals as of 19 June 2013

Alemayo Kebede Ayele (born 10 April 1987) is an Eritrean footballer who plays as an attacking midfielder for Adelaide Blue Eagles in the National Premier Leagues.

== Club career ==
In 2011, he signed with FFSA Super League club Croydon Kings after being granted political asylum by the Australian government. Following the 2012 Super League season it was announced he had won the Sergio Melta Medal which is awarded to the best player in the league.

== International career ==
Kebede played in the 2009 CECAFA Cup in Kenya, appearing in at least one match against Zimbabwe.

== Personal life ==
Whilst competing in the 2009 CECAFA Cup in Kenya he was part of the Eritrea national football team which failed to return home after competing in the regional tournament in Nairobi. After receiving political asylum from the Australian government, the team moved to Adelaide, Australia.

== Honors ==
- 2012 Sergio Melta Medal (FFSA Super League Player of the Year)
